= MTV Movie & TV Awards =

Film and television awards show

- Previous: 2023 MTV Movie & TV Awards; May 7, 2023
- The "Golden Popcorn" awarded at the 2012 MTV Movie Awards.
- Awarded for: Film and television
- Country: United States
- Presented by: MTV
- Formerly called: MTV Movie Awards
- First award: June 10, 1992; 34 years ago
- Final award: May 7, 2023; 3 years ago
- Website: www.mtv.com/movie-and-tv-awards

The MTV Movie & TV Awards was a film and television awards show that was presented annually on MTV from 1992 to 2023. It began as the MTV Movie Awards in 1992, when its first edition was held, and adopted its current name in 2017, beginning with its 26th edition.

The awards ceremony has traditionally been tied to the start of the summer blockbuster season for the film industry, and since the launch of the television awards, the opening of that industry's awards season. The nominees are decided by producers and executives at MTV. The winners are then decided by the general public. From 2007, voting was done only through an official website. Winners are presented with the "Golden Popcorn" statue made by New-York-firm Society Awards.

The 2023 MTV Movie & TV Awards were the final event.

== Production process ==
For much of its history, the ceremony was recorded for later broadcast, unlike the MTV Video Music Awards, which are usually live, but not live-to-tape, where the ceremony occurred in chronological order with appropriate edits. This meant that the ceremony was recorded out of order with the host segments recorded all at the start, followed by the musical performances and then award presentations, where those artists and actors nominated could choose to stay only for their award category and then depart after, with a seat filler filling their seat before or afterwards. After 2006, when Survivor producer Mark Burnett (who took over duties from Joel Gallen for the 2007 awards) took over production duties, it began to be broadcast live most years, though since 2017, it has been recorded live-to-tape, with a one or two-day delay before airing.

Since 2007, polls for several awards have been voted on through MTV's web and social media presences.

Due to the COVID-19 pandemic, the 2020 awards were cancelled. Internally, the network had discussed a permanent move of the ceremony to December, which would place it in the early portion of awards season before the Golden Globe Awards. Instead, MTV aired a Vanessa Hudgens-hosted clip show, MTV Movie & TV Awards: Greatest of All Time, on December 6, 2020, which featured highlights from past ceremonies and highlighted notable moments from film and television since the 1980s.

The network stated that it aimed to hold a larger, weekend-long ceremony in 2021. On March 11, 2021, MTV announced that the 2021 MTV Movie & TV Awards would be held on May 16 and 17, 2021, with the first night focusing on films and scripted television, and a new, second night (MTV Movie & TV Awards: Unscripted) focusing exclusively on awards in reality television. The 2022 ceremony maintained the split format, but with both segments airing back-to-back on a single night. The 2023 ceremony was originally to be hosted by Drew Barrymore, but Barrymore and other planned guests dropped out in solidarity with the 2023 Writers Guild of America strike. As a result, the in-person ceremony was cancelled and replaced by a pre-recorded virtual ceremony with no host. The awards have not been held since 2023.

== Award categories ==
=== Current awards ===
| Category | Year(s) | Notes |
Movie awards
| Movie of the Year | 1992–2023 | |
| Best Actor in a Movie | 2017–2023 | |
Movie & Television awards
| Best Musical Moment | 2017–2023 | |
| Best Breakthrough Performance | 2017–2023 | known as "Next Generation" in 2017 |
| Best Comedic Performance | 2017–2023 | |
| Most Frightened Performance | 2017–2023 | |
| Best Hero | 2017–2023 | |
| Best Villain | 2017–2023 | |
| Best Kiss | 2017–2023 | |
| Best Fight | 2017–2023 | |
| Best Duo | 2017–2023 | known as "Best On-Screen Team" in 2018 and "Best Team" in 2022 |
Television awards
| Best Show | 2017–2023 | |
| Best Performance in a Show | 2017–2023 | |
| Best Host | 2017, 2019–2023 | |
| Best Competition Series | 2017, 2021–2023 | known as "Best Reality Competition" in 2017 |
| Best Docu-Reality Series | 2018–2023 | known as "Best Reality Series/Franchise" in 2018 and "Best Reality Royalty" in 2019 |
| Best Music Documentary | 2018, 2021–2023 | |

=== Retired awards ===
| Category | Year(s) | Notes |
Movie awards
| Best Male Performance | 1992–2016 | |
| Best Female Performance | 1992–2016 | |
| Best Song from a Movie | 1992–2002, 2005, 2009, 2012, 2013–2015 | known as "Best Musical Sequence" in 2000–2002 and 2005, "Best Music" in 2012, and "Best Musical Moment" in 2013–2015 |
| Best Breakthrough Performance | 1992–1998, 2006–2008, 2010–2016 | known as "Breakout Star" in 2011–2012 |
| Best Male Breakthrough Performance | 1999–2005, 2009 | |
| Best Female Breakthrough Performance | 1999–2005, 2009 | |
| Best New Filmmaker | 1992–2002 | |
| Most Desirable Male | 1992–1996 | |
| Most Desirable Female | 1992–1996 | |
| Best Action Sequence | 1992–2005 | |
| Best Dance Sequence | 1995, 1998, 2001, 2004 | |
| Best Comedic Performance | 1992–2017 | |
| Most Frightened Performance | 2005–2016 | |
| Best Hero | 2006, 2010–2016 | known as "Biggest Bad-Ass Star" in 2010–2011 |
| Best Villain | 1992–2016 | known as "Best On-Screen Dirt Bag" in 2012 |
| Best Kiss | 1992–2016 | |
| Best Fight | 1996–2016 | |
| Best On-Screen Duo | 1992–2006, 2013–2015 | |
| Best Sandwich in a Movie | 1996 | |
| Best Cameo | 2001–2004, 2014 | |
| Best Dressed | 2001, 2002 | |
| Best Virtual Performance | 2003, 2016 | |
| Best Video Game Based on a Movie | 2005 | |
| Best Filmmaker on Campus | 2006–2007 | known as "MTVU Student Filmmaker Award" in 2007 |
| Sexiest Performance | 2006 | |
| Dirtiest Mouth Moment | 2007 | |
| Spoof Award | 2007 | |
| Best Summer Movie You Haven't Seen Yet | 2007 | |
| Best Summer Movie So Far | 2008 | |
| Best WTF Moment | 2009–2015 | known as "Best Jaw-Dropping Moment" in 2011 and "Best Gut-Wrenching Performance" in 2012 |
| Best Latino Actor | 2011–2013 | |
| Best Line from a Movie | 2001–2002, 2011 | known as "Best Line" in 2001–2002 |
| Best Cast | 2012, 2016 | known as "Ensemble Cast" in 2016 |
| Best Shirtless Performance | 2013–2015 | |
| Best On-Screen Transformation | 2013–2014 | |
| Favorite Character | 2014 | |
| Summer's Biggest Teen Bad-Ass | 2013 | |
| Best Documentary | 2016–2017 | |
| Best Action Performance | 2016 | |
| True Story | 2016 | |
Movie & Television awards
| Most Meme-able Moment | 2017, 2019 | known as "Trending" in 2017 |
| Best Fight Against the System | 2017 | |
| Best American Story | 2017 | |
| Tearjerker | 2017 | |
| Scene Stealer | 2018 | |
| Best Real-Life Hero | 2019 | |
| Here For The Hookup | 2022 | |
Television awards
| Best Talk/Topical Show | 2021–2022 | |
| Best New Unscripted Series | 2021–2022 | |
| Best Lifestyle Show | 2021–2022 | |
| Best Real-Life Mystery or Crime Series | 2021 | |
| Best Comedy/Game Show | 2021 | |
| Best Dating Show | 2021 | |
| Best International Reality Series | 2021 | |
| Best Reality Cast | 2021 | |
| Best Reality Fight | 2021–2022 | |
| Best Reality Romance | 2022 | |
| Best Reality Return | 2022 | |
Miscellaneous awards
| Global Superstar | 2010 | |
| Breakthrough Social Star | 2021–2022 | |

=== Special awards ===
==== Lifetime Achievement Award ====
| Year | Recipient |
|---|---|
| 1992 | Jason Voorhees |
| 1993 | The Three Stooges |
| 1994 | John Shaft |
| 1995 | Jackie Chan |
| 1996 | Godzilla |
| 1997 | Chewbacca |
| 1998 | Clint Howard |

==== Silver Bucket of Excellence ====
| Year | Recipient | Notes |
|---|---|---|
| 2005 | The Breakfast Club | awarded to Anthony Michael Hall, Molly Ringwald, and Ally Sheedy |
| 2006 | Do the Right Thing | awarded to Spike Lee |

==== Generation Award ====
| Year | Recipient |
|---|---|
| 2005 | Tom Cruise |
| 2006 | Jim Carrey |
| 2007 | Mike Myers |
| 2008 | Adam Sandler |
| 2009 | Ben Stiller |
| 2010 | Sandra Bullock |
| 2011 | Reese Witherspoon |
| 2012 | Johnny Depp |
| 2013 | Jamie Foxx |
| 2014 | Mark Wahlberg |
| 2015 | Robert Downey Jr. |
| 2016 | Will Smith |
| 2017 | The Fast and the Furious franchise |
| 2018 | Chris Pratt |
| 2019 | Dwayne Johnson |
| 2021 | Scarlett Johansson |
| 2022 | Jennifer Lopez |

==== Trailblazer Award ====
| Year | Recipient | Age Received |
|---|---|---|
| 2012 | Emma Stone | (23 years, 6 months, and 28 days) |
| 2013 | Emma Watson | (22 years, 11 months, and 30 days) |
| 2014 | Channing Tatum | (33 years, 11 months, and 13 days) |
| 2015 | Shailene Woodley | (23 years, 4 months, and 28 days) |
| 2018 | Lena Waithe | (34 years, 30 days) |
| 2019 | Jada Pinkett Smith | (47 years, 8 months, and 28 days) |

==== Comedic Genius Award ====
| Year | Recipient |
|---|---|
| 2013 | Will Ferrell |
| 2015 | Kevin Hart |
| 2016 | Melissa McCarthy |
| 2021 | Sacha Baron Cohen |
| 2022 | Jack Black |
| 2023 | Jennifer Coolidge |

==== Goat Award ====
| Year | Award | Recipient |
|---|---|---|
| 2020 | Dance Your A** Off | Kevin Bacon(Footloose) |
| 2020 | Comedy Giant | Kevin Hart |
| 2020 | Dynamic Duo | Drew Barrymore and Adam Sandler |
| 2020 | Scream Queen | Jamie Lee Curtis |
| 2020 | Legendary Lip Lock | Sarah Michelle Gellar and Selma Blair (Cruel Intentions) |
| 2020 | Heartbreaking Break- Up | Jason Segel and Kristen Bell (Forgetting Sarah Marshall) |
| 2020 | Zero to Hero | William Zabka (Karate Kid and Cobra Kai) |
| 2020 | Hero for the Ages | Chadwick Boseman |

== Years ==
| Year | Host(s) | Venue | Best Movie | Best Show | Best Performance (in a Movie) | | Best Breakthrough Performance | |
| Year | Host(s) | Venue | Best Movie | Best Show | Female | Male | | Female |
|---|---|---|---|---|---|---|---|---|
| 1992 | Dennis Miller | Walt Disney Studios | Terminator 2: Judgment Day | —N/a | Linda Hamilton, Terminator 2: Judgment Day | Arnold Schwarzenegger, Terminator 2: Judgment Day | Edward Furlong, Terminator 2: Judgment Day | |
| 1993 | Eddie Murphy | Walt Disney Studios | A Few Good Men | —N/a | Sharon Stone, Basic Instinct | Denzel Washington, Malcolm X | Marisa Tomei, My Cousin Vinny | |
| 1994 | Will Smith | Sony Pictures Studios | Menace II Society | —N/a | Janet Jackson, Poetic Justice | Tom Hanks, Philadelphia | Alicia Silverstone, The Crush | |
| 1995 | Jon Lovitz; Courteney Cox | Warner Bros. Studios | Pulp Fiction | —N/a | Sandra Bullock, Speed | Brad Pitt, Interview with the Vampire | Kirsten Dunst, Interview with the Vampire | |
| 1996 | Ben Stiller; Janeane Garofalo | Walt Disney Studios | Seven | —N/a | Alicia Silverstone, Clueless | Jim Carrey, Ace Ventura: When Nature Calls | George Clooney, From Dusk till Dawn | |
| 1997 | Mike Myers | Barker Hangar | Scream | —N/a | Claire Danes, Romeo + Juliet | Tom Cruise, Jerry Maguire | Matthew McConaughey, A Time to Kill | |
| 1998 | Samuel L. Jackson | Barker Hangar | Titanic | —N/a | Neve Campbell, Scream 2 | Leonardo DiCaprio, Titanic | Heather Graham, Boogie Nights | |
| 1999 | Lisa Kudrow | Barker Hangar | There's Something About Mary | —N/a | Cameron Diaz, There's Something About Mary | Jim Carrey, The Truman Show | James Van Der Beek, Varsity Blues | Katie Holmes, Disturbing Behavior |
| 2000 | Sarah Jessica Parker | Sony Pictures Studios | The Matrix | —N/a | Sarah Michelle Gellar, Cruel Intentions | Keanu Reeves, The Matrix | Haley Joel Osment, The Sixth Sense | Julia Stiles, 10 Things I Hate About You |
| 2001 | Jimmy Fallon; Kirsten Dunst | Shrine Auditorium | Gladiator | —N/a | Julia Roberts, Erin Brockovich | Tom Cruise, Mission: Impossible 2 | Sean Patrick Thomas, Save the Last Dance | Erika Christensen, Traffic |
| 2002 | Sarah Michelle Gellar; Jack Black | Shrine Auditorium | The Lord of the Rings: The Fellowship of the Ring | —N/a | Nicole Kidman, Moulin Rouge! | Will Smith, Ali | Orlando Bloom, The Lord of the Rings: The Fellowship of the Ring | Mandy Moore, A Walk to Remember |
| 2003 | Seann William Scott; Justin Timberlake | Shrine Auditorium | The Lord of the Rings: The Two Towers | —N/a | Kirsten Dunst, Spider-Man | Eminem, 8 Mile | | Jennifer Garner, Daredevil |
| 2004 | Lindsay Lohan | Sony Pictures Studios | The Lord of the Rings: The Return of the King | —N/a | Uma Thurman, Kill Bill: Volume 1 | Johnny Depp, Pirates of the Caribbean: The Curse of the Black Pearl | Shawn Ashmore, X2 | Lindsay Lohan, Freaky Friday |
| 2005 | Jimmy Fallon | Shrine Auditorium | Napoleon Dynamite | —N/a | Lindsay Lohan, Mean Girls | Leonardo DiCaprio, The Aviator | Jon Heder, Napoleon Dynamite | Rachel McAdams, Mean Girls |
| 2006 | Jessica Alba | Sony Pictures Studios | Wedding Crashers | —N/a | Jake Gyllenhaal, Brokeback Mountain | | Isla Fisher, Wedding Crashers | |
| 2007 | Sarah Silverman | Universal Amphitheatre | Pirates of the Caribbean: Dead Man's Chest | —N/a | Johnny Depp, Pirates of the Caribbean: Dead Man's Chest | | Jaden Smith, The Pursuit of Happyness | |
| 2008 | Mike Myers | Universal Amphitheatre | Transformers | —N/a | Ellen Page, Juno | Will Smith, I Am Legend | Zac Efron, Hairspray | |
| 2009 | Andy Samberg | Universal Amphitheatre | Twilight | —N/a | Kristen Stewart, Twilight | Zac Efron, High School Musical 3: Senior Year | Robert Pattinson, Twilight | Ashley Tisdale, High School Musical 3: Senior Year |
| 2010 | Aziz Ansari | Universal Amphitheatre | The Twilight Saga: New Moon | —N/a | Kristen Stewart, The Twilight Saga: New Moon | Robert Pattinson, The Twilight Saga: New Moon | Anna Kendrick, Up in the Air | |
| 2011 | Jason Sudeikis | Universal Amphitheatre | The Twilight Saga: Eclipse | —N/a | Kristen Stewart, The Twilight Saga: Eclipse | Robert Pattinson, The Twilight Saga: Eclipse | Chloë Grace Moretz, Kick Ass | |
| 2012 | Russell Brand | Universal Amphitheatre | The Twilight Saga: Breaking Dawn – Part 1 | —N/a | Jennifer Lawrence, The Hunger Games | Josh Hutcherson, The Hunger Games | Shailene Woodley, The Descendants | |
| 2013 | Rebel Wilson | Sony Pictures Studios | Marvel's The Avengers | —N/a | Jennifer Lawrence, Silver Linings Playbook | Bradley Cooper, Silver Linings Playbook | Rebel Wilson, Pitch Perfect | |
| 2014 | Conan O'Brien | Peacock Theater | The Hunger Games: Catching Fire | —N/a | Jennifer Lawrence, The Hunger Games: Catching Fire | Josh Hutcherson, The Hunger Games: Catching Fire | Will Poulter, We're the Millers | |
| 2015 | Amy Schumer | Peacock Theater | The Fault In Our Stars | —N/a | Shailene Woodley, The Fault In Our Stars | Bradley Cooper, American Sniper | Dylan O'Brien, The Maze Runner | |
| 2016 | Dwayne Johnson; Kevin Hart | Warner Bros. Studios | Star Wars: The Force Awakens | —N/a | Charlize Theron, Mad Max: Fury Road | Leonardo DiCaprio, The Revenant | Daisy Ridley, Star Wars: The Force Awakens | |
| 2017 | Adam DeVine | Shrine Auditorium | Beauty and the Beast | Stranger Things | Emma Watson, Beauty and the Beast | | Daniel Kaluuya, Get Out | |
| 2018 | Tiffany Haddish | Barker Hangar | Black Panther | Stranger Things | Chadwick Boseman, Black Panther | | Tiffany Haddish, Girls Trip | |
| 2019 | Zachary Levi | Barker Hangar | Avengers: Endgame | Game of Thrones | Lady Gaga, A Star Is Born | | Noah Centineo, To All the Boys I've Loved Before | |
| 2020 | Vanessa Hudgens | Not held due to COVID-19 pandemic; Greatest of All Time special aired instead | | | | | | |
| 2021 | Leslie Jones; Nikki Glaser | Hollywood Palladium | To All the Boys: Always and Forever | WandaVision | Chadwick Boseman, Ma Rainey's Black Bottom | | Regé-Jean Page, Bridgerton | |
| 2022 | Vanessa Hudgens; Tayshia Adams | Barker Hangar | Spider-Man: No Way Home | Euphoria | Tom Holland, Spider-Man: No Way Home | | Sophia Di Martino, Loki | |
| 2023 | —N/a | | Scream VI | The Last of Us | Tom Cruise, Top Gun: Maverick | | Joseph Quinn, Stranger Things | |
| 2024 | —N/a | | Not held | | | | | |
| 2025 | —N/a | | Not held | | | | | |

=== Records ===
Films that won Best Movie at the MTV Movie & TV Awards and Best Picture at the Academy Awards

- 1998: Titanic
- 2001: Gladiator
- 2004: The Lord of the Rings: The Return of the King

Franchise or film series that have won Best Movie more than once

- The Twilight Saga: 2009, 2010, 2011, 2012
- Marvel Cinematic Universe: Avengers (2013, 2019), Black Panther (2018), Spider-Man (2022)
- The Lord of the Rings: 2002, 2003, 2004
- Scream: 1997, 2023

== Film parodies ==
Since 1993, scenes are spoofed, mostly from that year's most popular films, although television shows and older movies have also been chosen. This may include sound and video montages, replacing some of the original cast with other actors (commonly, the hosts of each year's show) generally mocking the scenes of that film. The diversity of the spoofs can vary greatly, from one dialogue (such as in 2005) to several long scenes, including fighting and action sequences (2003).

MTV Movie Awards Film Spoofs by Year
| Year | Film | Starring | Watch |
|---|---|---|---|
| 1993 | Basic Instinct | Florence Henderson; Barry Williams; Christopher Knight; Susan Olsen | |
| 1993 | A Few Good Men | Florence Henderson; Barry Williams; Christopher Knight | |
| 1993 | The Bodyguard | Florence Henderson; Barry Williams | |
| 1994 | The Fugitive | The Monkey Troupe | |
| 1994 | Jurassic Park | Charlton Heston; The Monkey Troupe | |
| 1994 | The Piano | The Monkey Troupe | |
| 1995 | Speed | Danny Bonaduce; Shirley Jones; Dave Madden | |
| 1995 | Pulp Fiction | Lawrence Hilton-Jacobs; Robert Hegyes; Ron Palillo | |
| 1995 | Dumb and Dumber | Sherman Hemsley; Isabel Sanford; Franklin Cover | |
| 1995 | Interview with the Vampire | Frank Gorshin; Adam West | |
| 1996 | Twister | Ben Stiller; Janeane Garofalo; Jay Leno | |
| 1996 | Braveheart | Bob Newhart; Jack Riley; Peter Bonerz; Bill Daily | |
| 1996 | Clueless | The Golden Girls | |
| 1996 | Seven | William Shatner (in all three key roles) | |
| 1997 | The Lost World: Jurassic Park | Vince Vaughn; Ben Stiller; Mike Myers; Janeane Garofalo; Jay Leno | |
| 1997 | Romeo + Juliet | Mike Myers as Austin Powers; Jenny McCarthy | |
| 1997 | Scream | Mike Myers; Drew Barrymore | |
| 1998 | Godzilla, Taxi (combined in one video) | Christopher Lloyd (as Jim Ignatowski); Samuel L. Jackson | |
| 1998 | Dawson's Creek | Katie Holmes; James Van Der Beek; Samuel L. Jackson | |
| 1999 | Star Wars: Episode I – The Phantom Menace | Lisa Kudrow (as herself); Andy Dick | Creator's web-site |
| 1999 | Amalgam of Risky Business, Ferris Bueller's Day Off, She's All That, I Know What You Did Last Summer, Sixteen Candles, Varsity Blues, The Breakfast Club and Cruel Intentions | Alyson Hannigan; Jaime Pressly; Chris Owen; Charlie O'Connell | |
| 1999 | Armagedd'NSync (Armageddon) | 'N Sync; Lisa Kudrow; Clint Howard | Creator's web-site |
| 2000 | Sex and the Matrix (Sex and the City, The Matrix, combined) | Sarah Jessica Parker (as Carrie Bradshaw); Jimmy Fallon (Neo); Vince Vaughn ("White Rabbit") | Creator's web-site |
| 2000 | Mission: Impossible 2 | Ben Stiller (as Tom Crooze, Tom Cruise's stunt double) | Creator's web-site |
| 2001 | Cast Away | Andy Dick | Creator's web-site |
| 2001 | The Mummy Returns | Jimmy Fallon; Snoop Dogg; Kirsten Dunst; Rob Schneider; Oded Fehr | |
| 2001 | Adam Sandler Skit | Adam Sandler; Jimmy Fallon; Britney Spears; Kirsten Dunst | |
| 2002 | Lord of the Piercing (The Lord of the Rings: The Fellowship of the Ring) | Jack Black (as Jack the Elf - Ring-bearer); Sarah Michelle Gellar (Arwen) | Creator's web-site |
| 2002 | Jack Black: Spider-Man (Spider-Man) | Jack Black (as Spider-Man); Sarah Michelle Gellar (Mary Jane Watson / Wonder Woman) | Creator's web-site |
| 2002 | Panic Room | Jack Black; Will Ferrell | Creator's web-site |
| 2003 | MTV: Reloaded (The Matrix Reloaded) | Justin Timberlake (as "a One"); Seann William Scott ("a One", Agent Scott); Will Ferrell (Larry the Architect); Randall Duk Kim (Keymaker); Wanda Sykes (Oracle) | Creator's web-site |
| 2004 | Kill Bill: Volume 2 | Lindsay Lohan; Andy Dick | |
| 2005 | Star Wars: Episode III – Revenge of the Sith | Jimmy Fallon (as Anakin Skywalker) | Creator's web-site |
| 2005 | Batman Begins | Jimmy Fallon; Jon Heder (as Napoleon Dynamite); Andy Dick | Creator's web-site |
| 2006 | Mission: Impossible III | Jessica Alba; Topher Grace; Flavor Flav | Creator's web-site |
| 2006 | King Kong | Jessica Alba | Creator's web-site |
| 2006 | The Da Vinci Code | Jessica Alba (as herself, based on Sophie Neveu); Jimmy Fallon (himself, based on Jacques Saunière and Robert Langdon); Andy Dick (himself, based on Silas); Ron Perlman (himself); Gary Cole (himself); Chris Daughtry (himself) | Creator's web-site |
| 2007 | Transformers, The Devil Wears Prada, Dreamgirls, Babel, The Pursuit of Happyness, The Departed and 300 | Optimus Prime; Sarah Silverman; Shia LaBeouf; Jennifer Hudson; Meryl Streep; Brad Pitt; Will Smith; Leonardo DiCaprio; Jack Nicholson; Matt Damon; Gerard Butler | |
| 2008 | Iron Man, Kung Fu Panda and Tropic Thunder | Robert Downey Jr. Jack Black; Ben Stiller | |
| 2009 | Twilight, Star Trek, Slumdog Millionaire and The Reader | Andy Samberg; Robert Pattinson; Aziz Ansari; Taylor Swift; Justin Timberlake; Kristen Bell; Taylor Lautner | |
| 2010 | Precious and The Blind Side | Aziz Ansari; Quinton Aaron; Jae Head; Mo'Nique; Paula Patton; Justin Bieber | |
| 2011 | The Hangover Part II, Black Swan, 127 Hours, The Social Network and The Twilight Saga: Eclipse | Jason Sudeikis; Taylor Lautner; Justin Bartha; Chelsea Handler; Natalie Portman; Mila Kunis; Justin Timberlake; James Franco; Eva Mendes | |
| 2013 | Les Misérables, Life of Pi and Magic Mike | Rebel Wilson; Anne Hathaway; Suraj Sharma; Matthew McConaughey | |
| 2018 | Black Panther, Star Wars: The Last Jedi and A Quiet Place | Tiffany Haddish; Queen Latifah; Jada Pinkett Smith; Lil Rel Howery | |
| 2019 | Us and Game of Thrones | Zachary Levi; June Diane Raphael; Faithe Herman; Ian Chen; Emilia Clarke; Jacob Anderson; Kit Harington; Peter Dinklage | |
| 2021 | WandaVision, One Night in Miami..., Promising Young Woman | Randall Park; Kat Dennings; Carl Winslow; Faithe Herman; Laura Winslow | |

== See also ==
- List of American television awards
