= MTV Movie Award for Best Breakthrough Performance =

Award

This is a following list of the MTV Movie Award winners and nominees for Best Breakthrough Performance, first awarded in 1992. In 2010 and 2011, it was renamed Best Breakout Star. In 2012, it returned to its original name but was turned into a non-voting category, where an academy of outstanding directors honors a silver screen newcomer with extraordinary talent. In 2017, it was renamed Next Generation, and was converted to a voting category.

From 1999 to 2005, and in 2009, it was split into two categories: Best Male Breakthrough Performance and Best Female Breakthrough Performance.

== Winners and nominees ==
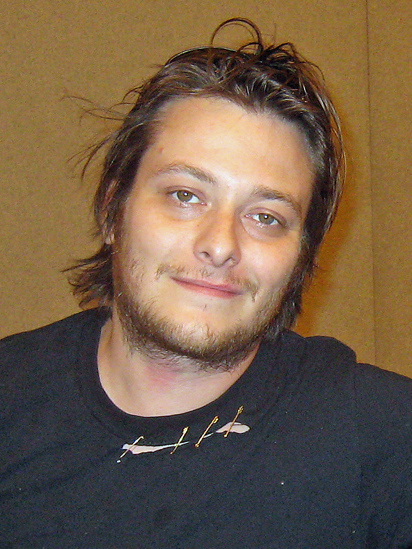
First winner of this award category - 14-year-old Edward Furlong in Terminator 2: Judgment Day, 1992

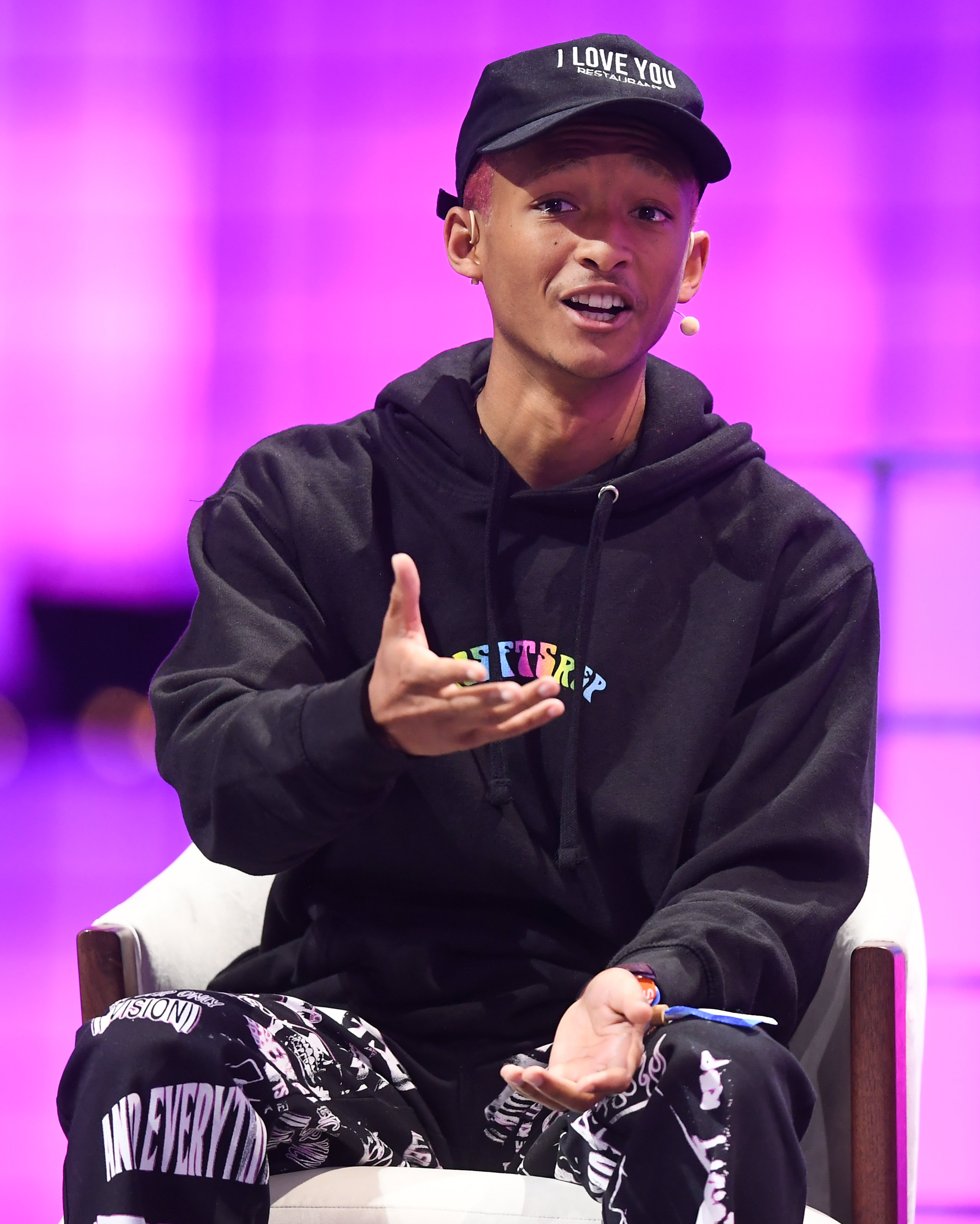
2007 winner Jaden Smith on his performance in The Pursuit of Happyness. Smith won the award at the age of 8. He is the youngest winner in this category and also the youngest in any of the awards ceremony's history. He broke a record that he still holds today.

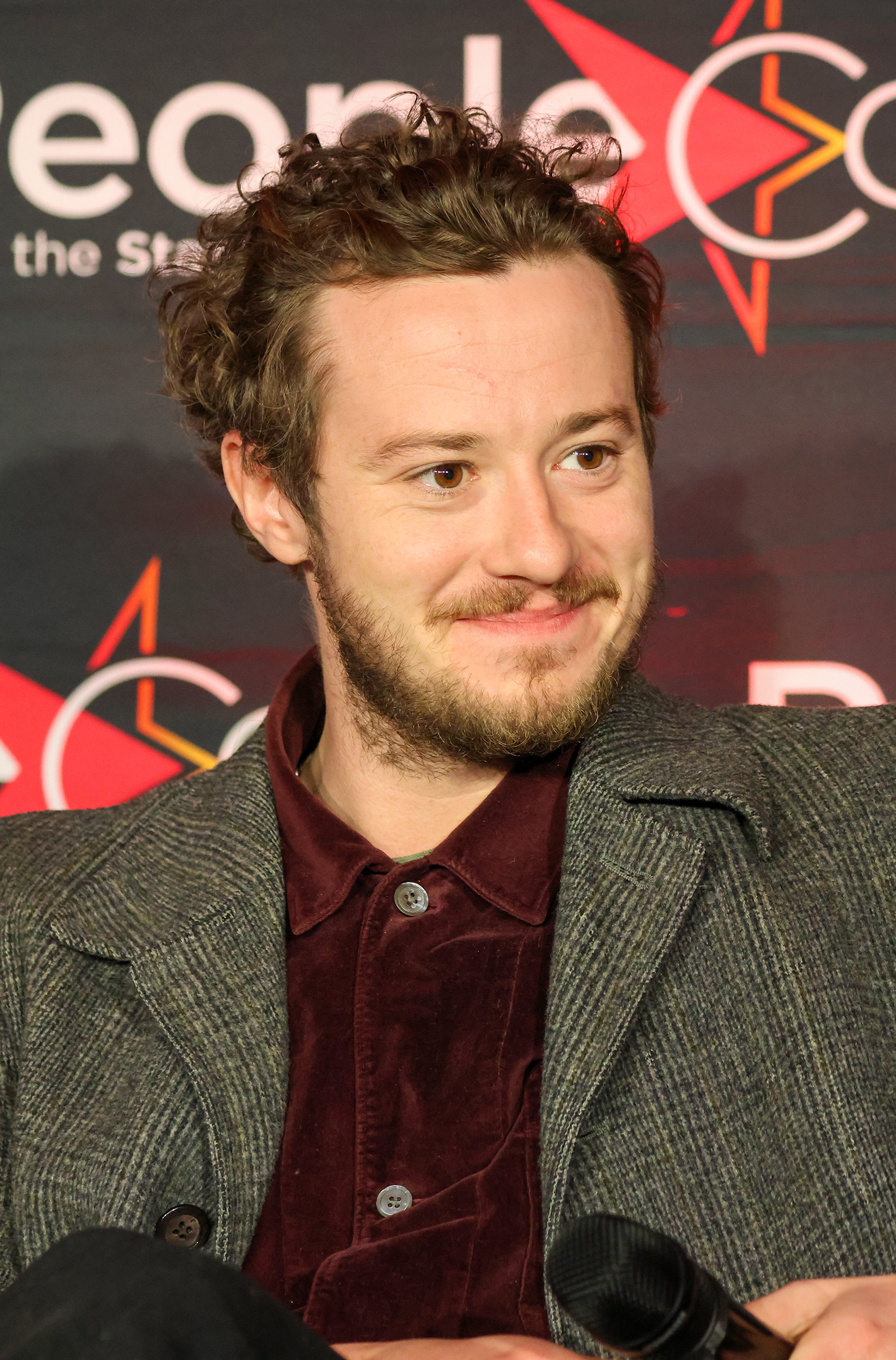
Most recent winner Joseph Quinn on his performance as Eddie Munson in Stranger Things, 2023

=== 1990s ===
Year	Winners and nominees	Film	Role	Ref
1992	Edward Furlong	Terminator 2: Judgment Day	John Connor	
1992	Anna Chlumsky	My Girl	Vada Sultenfuss	
1992	Ice-T	New Jack City	Scotty Appleton	
1992	Campbell Scott	Dying Young	Victor Geddes	
1992	Kimberly Williams	Father of the Bride	Annie Banks	
1993	Marisa Tomei	My Cousin Vinny	Mona Lisa Vito	
1993	Halle Berry	Boomerang	Angela Lewis	
1993	Whitney Houston	The Bodyguard	Rachel Marron	
1993	Kathy Najimy	Sister Act	Sister Mary Patrick	
1993	Rosie O'Donnell	A League of Their Own	Doris Murphy	
1994	Alicia Silverstone	The Crush	Adrian Forrester	
1994	Ralph Fiennes	Schindler's List	Amon Göth	
1994	Jason Scott Lee	Dragon: The Bruce Lee Story	Bruce Lee	
1994	Ross Malinger	Sleepless in Seattle	Jonah Baldwin	
1994	Jason James Richter	Free Willy	Jesse	
1995	Kirsten Dunst	Interview with the Vampire	Claudia	
1995	Tim Allen	The Santa Clause	Scott Calvin	
1995	Cameron Diaz	The Mask	Tina Carlyle	
1995	Hugh Grant	Four Weddings and a Funeral	Charles	
1995	Mykelti Williamson	Forrest Gump	Bubba Blue	
1996	George Clooney	From Dusk till Dawn	Seth Gecko	
1996	Sean Patrick Flanery	Powder	Jeremy "Powder" Reed	
1996	Natasha Henstridge	Species	Sil	
1996	Lela Rochon	Waiting to Exhale	Robin Stokes	
1996	Chris Tucker	Friday	Smokey	
1997	Matthew McConaughey	A Time to Kill	Jake Brigance	
1997	Vivica A. Fox	Independence Day	Jasmine Dubrow	
1997	Courtney Love	The People vs. Larry Flynt	Althea Leasure	
1997	Ewan McGregor	Trainspotting	Mark "Rent Boy" Renton	
1997	Renée Zellweger	Jerry Maguire	Dorothy Boyd	
1998	Heather Graham	Boogie Nights	Rollergirl	
1998	Joey Lauren Adams	Chasing Amy	Alyssa Jones	
1998	Rupert Everett	My Best Friend's Wedding	George Downes	
1998	Sarah Michelle Gellar	I Know What You Did Last Summer	Helen Shivers	
1998	Jennifer Lopez	Selena	Selena	
1999	James Van Der Beek	Varsity Blues	Jonathan "Mox" Moxon	
1999	Ray Allen	He Got Game	Jesus Shuttlesworth	
1999	Joseph Fiennes	Shakespeare in Love	William Shakespeare	
1999	Josh Hartnett	Halloween H20: 20 Years Later	John Tate	
1999	Chris Rock	Lethal Weapon 4	Detective Lee Butters	
1999	Katie Holmes	Disturbing Behavior	Rachel Waggner	
1999	Cate Blanchett	Elizabeth	Elizabeth I	
1999	Brandy	I Still Know What You Did Last Summer	Karla Wilson	
1999	Rachael Leigh Cook	She's All That	Laney Boggs	
1999	Catherine Zeta-Jones	The Mask of Zorro	Elena Montero	

=== 2000s ===
Year	Winners and nominees	Film	Role
2000	Haley Joel Osment	The Sixth Sense	Cole Sear
2000	Wes Bentley	American Beauty	Ricky Fitts
2000	Jason Biggs	American Pie	Jim Levenstein
2000	Michael Clarke Duncan	The Green Mile	John Coffey
2000	Jamie Foxx	Any Given Sunday	"Steamin" Willie Beamen
2000	Julia Stiles	10 Things I Hate About You	Kat Stratford
2000	Selma Blair	Cruel Intentions	Cecile Duvall
2000	Shannon Elizabeth	American Pie	Nadia
2000	Carrie-Anne Moss	The Matrix	Trinity
2000	Hilary Swank	Boys Don't Cry	Brandon Teena
2001	Sean Patrick Thomas	Save the Last Dance	Derek Reynolds
2001	Jack Black	High Fidelity	Barry
2001	Patrick Fugit	Almost Famous	William Miller
2001	Tom Green	Road Trip	Barry Manilow
2001	Hugh Jackman	X-Men	Wolverine
2001	Ashton Kutcher	Dude, Where's My Car?	Jesse Montgomery III
2001	Erika Christensen	Traffic	Caroline Wakefield
2001	Aaliyah	Romeo Must Die	Trish O'Day
2001	Anna Faris	Scary Movie	Cindy Campbell
2001	Piper Perabo	Coyote Ugly	Violet Sanford
2001	Zhang Ziyi	Crouching Tiger, Hidden Dragon	Jen Yu
2002	Orlando Bloom	The Lord of the Rings: The Fellowship of the Ring	Legolas
2002	DMX	Exit Wounds	Latrell Walker / Leon Rollins
2002	Colin Hanks	Orange County	Shaun Brumder
2002	Daniel Radcliffe	Harry Potter and the Sorcerer's Stone	Harry Potter
2002	Paul Walker	The Fast and the Furious	Brian O'Conner
2002	Mandy Moore	A Walk to Remember	Jamie Elizabeth Sullivan
2002	Penélope Cruz	Blow	Mirtha Jung
2002	Anne Hathaway	The Princess Diaries	Princess Mia Thermopolis
2002	Shannyn Sossamon	A Knight's Tale	Jocelyn
2002	Britney Spears	Crossroads	Lucy Wagner
2003	Eminem	8 Mile	Jimmy "B-Rabbit" Smith
2003	Nick Cannon	Drumline	Devon Miles
2003	Kieran Culkin	Igby Goes Down	Jason "Igby" Slocumb, Jr.
2003	Derek Luke	Antwone Fisher	Antwone Fisher
2003	Ryan Reynolds	National Lampoon's Van Wilder	Van Wilder
2003	Jennifer Garner	Daredevil	Elektra
2003	Kate Bosworth	Blue Crush	Anne Marie Chadwick
2003	Eve	Barbershop	Terri Jones
2003	Maggie Gyllenhaal	Secretary	Lee Holloway
2003	Beyoncé Knowles	Austin Powers in Goldmember	Foxxy Cleopatra
2003	Nia Vardalos	My Big Fat Greek Wedding	Toula Portokalos
2004	Shawn Ashmore	X2	Iceman
2004	Shia LaBeouf	Holes	Stanley "Caveman" Yelnats IV
2004	Ludacris	2 Fast 2 Furious	Tej Parker
2004	Omarion	You Got Served	David
2004	Cillian Murphy	28 Days Later	Jim
2004	Lindsay Lohan	Freaky Friday	Anna Coleman
2004	Jessica Biel	The Texas Chainsaw Massacre	Erin
2004	Scarlett Johansson	Lost in Translation	Charlotte
2004	Keira Knightley	Pirates of the Caribbean: The Curse of the Black Pearl	Elizabeth Swann
2004	Evan Rachel Wood	Thirteen	Tracy Louise Freeland
2005	Jon Heder	Napoleon Dynamite	Napoleon Dynamite
2005	Zach Braff	Garden State	Andrew Largeman
2005	Freddie Highmore	Finding Neverland	Peter Llewelyn Davies
2005	Tim McGraw	Friday Night Lights	Charles Billingsley
2005	Tyler Perry	Diary of a Mad Black Woman	Madea
2005	Rachel McAdams	Mean Girls	Regina George
2005	Ashanti	Coach Carter	Kyra
2005	Elisha Cuthbert	The Girl Next Door	Danielle
2005	Bryce Dallas Howard	The Village	Ivy Elizabeth Walker
2005	Emmy Rossum	The Day After Tomorrow	Laura Chapman
2006	Isla Fisher	Wedding Crashers	Gloria Cleary
2006	André "3000" Benjamin	Four Brothers	Jeremiah Mercer
2006	Jennifer Carpenter	The Exorcism of Emily Rose	Emily Rose
2006	Taraji P. Henson	Hustle & Flow	Shug
2006	Romany Malco	The 40-Year-Old Virgin	Jay
2006	Nelly	The Longest Yard	Earl Megget
2007	Jaden Smith	The Pursuit of Happyness	Christopher Gardner, Jr.
2007	Emily Blunt	The Devil Wears Prada	Emily Charlton
2007	Abigail Breslin	Little Miss Sunshine	Olive Hoover
2007	Lena Headey	300	Queen Gorgo
2007	Columbus Short	Stomp the Yard	DJ Williams
2007	Justin Timberlake	Alpha Dog	Frankie "Nuts" Ballenbacher
2008	Zac Efron	Hairspray	Link Larkin
2008	Nikki Blonsky	Hairspray	Tracy Turnblad
2008	Chris Brown	This Christmas	Michael "Baby" Whitfield
2008	Michael Cera	Superbad	Evan
2008	Megan Fox	Transformers	Mikaela Banes
2008	Jonah Hill	Superbad	Seth
2008	Christopher Mintz-Plasse	Superbad	McLovin'
2008	Seth Rogen	Knocked Up	Ben Stone
2009	Robert Pattinson	Twilight	Edward Cullen
2009	Ben Barnes	The Chronicles of Narnia: Prince Caspian	Prince Caspian
2009	Taylor Lautner	Twilight	Jacob Black
2009	Dev Patel	Slumdog Millionaire	Jamal Malik
2009	Bobb'e J. Thompson	Role Models	Ronnie Shields
2009	Ashley Tisdale	High School Musical 3: Senior Year	Sharpay Evans
2009	Miley Cyrus	Hannah Montana: The Movie	Miley Stewart/Hannah Montana
2009	Kat Dennings	Nick and Norah's Infinite Playlist	Norah
2009	Vanessa Hudgens	High School Musical 3: Senior Year	Gabriella Montez
2009	Freida Pinto	Slumdog Millionaire	Latika
2009	Amanda Seyfried	Mamma Mia!	Sophie Sheridan

=== 2010s ===
Year	Winners and nominees	Film/Show	Role
2010	Anna Kendrick	Up in the Air	Natalie Keener
2010	Quinton Aaron	The Blind Side	Michael Oher
2010	Zach Galifianakis	The Hangover	Alan Garner
2010	Logan Lerman	Percy Jackson & the Olympians: The Lightning Thief	Percy Jackson
2010	Chris Pine	Star Trek	Captain James T. Kirk
2010	Gabourey Sidibe	Precious	Claireece "Precious" Jones
2011	Chloë Grace Moretz	Kick-Ass	Hit-Girl
2011	Jay Chou	The Green Hornet	Kato
2011	Andrew Garfield	The Social Network	Eduardo Saverin
2011	Xavier Samuel	The Twilight Saga: Eclipse	Riley Biers
2011	Hailee Steinfeld	True Grit	Mattie Ross
2011	Olivia Wilde	Tron: Legacy	Quorra
2012	Shailene Woodley	The Descendants	Alexandra "Alex" King
2012	Elle Fanning	Super 8	Alice Dainard
2012	Melissa McCarthy	Bridesmaids	Megan Price
2012	Rooney Mara	The Girl with the Dragon Tattoo	Lisbeth Salander
2012	Liam Hemsworth	The Hunger Games	Gale Hawthorne
2013	Rebel Wilson	Pitch Perfect	Fat Amy
2013	Ezra Miller	The Perks of Being a Wallflower	Patrick
2013	Eddie Redmayne	Les Misérables	Marius Pontmercy
2013	Suraj Sharma	Life of Pi	Piscine "Pi" Patel
2013	Quvenzhané Wallis	Beasts of the Southern Wild	Hushpuppy
2014	Will Poulter	We're the Millers	Kenny Rossmore
2014	Liam James	The Way, Way Back	Duncan
2014	Margot Robbie	The Wolf of Wall Street	Naomi Lapaglia
2014	Michael B. Jordan	Fruitvale Station	Oscar Grant
2014	Miles Teller	The Spectacular Now	Sutter Keely
2015	Dylan O'Brien	The Maze Runner	Thomas
2015	Ansel Elgort	The Fault in Our Stars	Augustus Waters
2015	David Oyelowo	Selma	Martin Luther King Jr.
2015	Ellar Coltrane	Boyhood	Mason Evans, Jr.
2015	Rosamund Pike	Gone Girl	Amy Elliott-Dunne
2016	Daisy Ridley	Star Wars: The Force Awakens	Rey
2016	Amy Schumer	Trainwreck	Amy Townsend
2016	Brie Larson	Room	Joy "Ma" Newsome
2016	Dakota Johnson	Fifty Shades of Grey	Anastasia Steele
2016	John Boyega	Star Wars: The Force Awakens	Finn
2016	O'Shea Jackson Jr.	Straight Outta Compton	Ice Cube
2017	Daniel Kaluuya	Get Out	Chris Washington
2017	Riz Ahmed	Rogue One: A Star Wars Story	Bodhi Rook
2017	Chrissy Metz	This Is Us	Kate Pearson
2017	Issa Rae	Insecure	Issa Dee
2017	Yara Shahidi	Black-ish	Zoey Johnson
2018	Tiffany Haddish	Girls Trip	Dina
2018	Iain Armitage	Big Little Lies	Ziggy Chapman
2018	Iain Armitage	Young Sheldon	Sheldon Cooper
2018	Timothée Chalamet	Call Me by Your Name	Elio Perlman
2018	Katherine Langford	13 Reasons Why	Hannah Baker
2018	Katherine Langford	Love, Simon	Leah Burke
2018	Nick Robinson	Love, Simon	Simon Spier
2018	Letitia Wright	Black Panther	Shuri
2019	Noah Centineo	To All the Boys I've Loved Before	Peter Kavinsky
2019	Awkwafina	Crazy Rich Asians	Goh Peik Lin
2019	Ncuti Gatwa	Sex Education	Eric Effiong
2019	Haley Lu Richardson	Five Feet Apart	Stella
2019	Michaela Jaé Rodriguez	Pose	Blanca Rodriguez

=== 2020s ===
Year	Winners and nominees	Film/Show	Role
2020	Ceremony not held due to COVID-19 pandemic; Greatest of All Time special aired instead		
2021	Regé-Jean Page	Bridgerton	Simon, Duke of Hastings
2021	Maria Bakalova	Borat Subsequent Moviefilm	Tutar
2021	Antonia Gentry	Ginny & Georgia	Ginny Miller
2021	Paul Mescal	Normal People	Connell Waldren
2021	Ashley Park	Emily in Paris	Mindy Chen
2022	Sophia Di Martino	Loki	Sylvie
2022	Ariana DeBose	West Side Story	Anita
2022	Hannah Einbinder	Hacks	Ava Daniels
2022	Alana Haim	Licorice Pizza	Alana Kane
2022	Jung Ho-yeon	Squid Game	Kang Sae-byeok
2023	Joseph Quinn	Stranger Things	Eddie Munson
2023	Bad Bunny	Bullet Train	The Wolf
2023	Bella Ramsey	The Last of Us	Ellie
2023	Emma D'Arcy	House of the Dragon	Rhaenyra Targaryen
2023	Rachel Sennott	Bodies Bodies Bodies	Alice
