= MTV Movie Award for Movie of the Year =

MTV Movie Award

This is a following list of the MTV Movie Award winners and nominees for Best Movie. From 2012 to 2018, it was renamed to Movie of the Year. The Lord of the Rings Trilogy won in three consecutive years (2002–2004) and is the only franchise who took home “Movie of the Year” for all their films. The Twilight Saga films won in four consecutive years (2009–2012), along with Best Kiss.

== Winners and nominees ==
=== 1990s ===
Year	Nominees	Director	Ref
1992	Terminator 2: Judgment Day	James Cameron	
1992	Backdraft	Ron Howard	
1992	Boyz n the Hood	John Singleton	
1992	JFK	Oliver Stone	
1992	Robin Hood: Prince of Thieves	Kevin Reynolds	
1993	A Few Good Men	Rob Reiner	
1993	Aladdin	John Musker and Ron Clements	
1993	Basic Instinct	Paul Verhoeven	
1993	The Bodyguard	Mick Jackson	
1993	Malcolm X	Spike Lee	
1994	Menace II Society	Allen and Albert Hughes	
1994	The Fugitive	Andrew Davis	
1994	Jurassic Park	Steven Spielberg	
1994	Philadelphia	Jonathan Demme	
1994	Schindler's List	Steven Spielberg	
1995	Pulp Fiction	Quentin Tarantino	
1995	The Crow	Alex Proyas	
1995	Forrest Gump	Robert Zemeckis	
1995	Interview with the Vampire	Neil Jordan	
1995	Speed	Jan de Bont	
1996	Se7en	David Fincher	
1996	Apollo 13	Ron Howard	
1996	Braveheart	Mel Gibson	
1996	Clueless	Amy Heckerling	
1996	Dangerous Minds	John N. Smith	
1997	Scream	Wes Craven	
1997	Independence Day	Roland Emmerich	
1997	Jerry Maguire	Cameron Crowe	
1997	The Rock	Michael Bay	
1997	Romeo + Juliet	Baz Luhrmann	
1998	Titanic	James Cameron	
1998	Austin Powers: International Man of Mystery	Jay Roach	
1998	Face/Off	John Woo	
1998	Good Will Hunting	Gus Van Sant	
1998	Men in Black	Barry Sonnenfeld	
1999	There's Something About Mary	The Farrelly Brothers	
1999	Armageddon	Michael Bay	
1999	Saving Private Ryan	Steven Spielberg	
1999	Shakespeare in Love	John Madden	
1999	The Truman Show	Peter Weir	

=== 2000s ===
Year	Nominees	Director	Ref
2000	The Matrix	The Wachowskis	
2000	American Beauty	Sam Mendes	
2000	American Pie	Chris Weitz and Paul Weitz	
2000	Austin Powers: The Spy Who Shagged Me	Jay Roach	
2000	The Sixth Sense	M. Night Shyamalan	
2001	Gladiator	Ridley Scott	
2001	Crouching Tiger, Hidden Dragon	Ang Lee	
2001	Erin Brockovich	Steven Soderbergh	
2001	Hannibal	Ridley Scott	
2001	X-Men	Bryan Singer	
2002	The Lord of the Rings: The Fellowship of the Ring	Peter Jackson	
2002	Black Hawk Down	Ridley Scott	
2002	The Fast and the Furious	Rob Cohen	
2002	Legally Blonde	Robert Luketic	
2002	Shrek	Andrew Adamson and Vicky Jenson	
2003	The Lord of the Rings: The Two Towers	Peter Jackson	
2003	8 Mile	Curtis Hanson	
2003	Barbershop	Tim Story	
2003	The Ring	Gore Verbinski	
2003	Spider-Man	Sam Raimi	
2004	The Lord of the Rings: The Return of the King	Peter Jackson	
2004	50 First Dates	Peter Segal	
2004	Finding Nemo	Andrew Stanton	
2004	Pirates of the Caribbean: The Curse of the Black Pearl	Gore Verbinski	
2004	X2: X-Men United	Bryan Singer	
2005	Napoleon Dynamite	Jared Hess	
2005	The Incredibles	Brad Bird	
2005	Kill Bill: Volume 2	Quentin Tarantino	
2005	Ray	Taylor Hackford	
2005	Spider-Man 2	Sam Raimi	
2006	Wedding Crashers	David Dobkin	
2006	The 40-Year-Old Virgin	Judd Apatow	
2006	Batman Begins	Christopher Nolan	
2006	King Kong	Peter Jackson	
2006	Sin City	Robert Rodriguez and Frank Miller	
2007	Pirates of the Caribbean: Dead Man's Chest	Gore Verbinski	
2007	300	Zack Snyder	
2007	Blades of Glory	Will Speck and Josh Gordon	
2007	Borat	Larry Charles	
2007	Little Miss Sunshine	Jonathan Dayton and Valerie Faris	
2008	Transformers	Michael Bay	
2008	I Am Legend	Francis Lawrence	
2008	Juno	Jason Reitman	
2008	National Treasure: Book of Secrets	Jon Turteltaub	
2008	Pirates of the Caribbean: At World's End	Gore Verbinski	
2008	Superbad	Greg Mottola	
2009	Twilight	Catherine Hardwicke	
2009	The Dark Knight	Christopher Nolan	
2009	High School Musical 3: Senior Year	Kenny Ortega	
2009	Iron Man	Jon Favreau	
2009	Slumdog Millionaire	Danny Boyle	

=== 2010s ===
Year	Nominees	Director	Ref
2010	The Twilight Saga: New Moon	Chris Weitz	
2010	Alice in Wonderland	Tim Burton	
2010	Avatar	James Cameron	
2010	The Hangover	Todd Phillips	
2010	Harry Potter and the Half-Blood Prince	David Yates	
2011	The Twilight Saga: Eclipse	David Slade	
2011	Black Swan	Darren Aronofsky	
2011	Harry Potter and the Deathly Hallows – Part 1	David Yates	
2011	Inception	Christopher Nolan	
2011	The Social Network	David Fincher	
2012	The Twilight Saga: Breaking Dawn – Part 1	Bill Condon	
2012	Bridesmaids	Paul Feig	
2012	Harry Potter and the Deathly Hallows – Part 2	David Yates	
2012	The Help	Tate Taylor	
2012	The Hunger Games	Gary Ross	
2013	The Avengers	Joss Whedon	
2013	The Dark Knight Rises	Christopher Nolan	
2013	Django Unchained	Quentin Tarantino	
2013	Silver Linings Playbook	David O. Russell	
2013	Ted	Seth MacFarlane	
2014	The Hunger Games: Catching Fire	Francis Lawrence	
2014	12 Years a Slave	Steve McQueen	
2014	American Hustle	David O. Russell	
2014	The Hobbit: The Desolation of Smaug	Peter Jackson	
2014	The Wolf of Wall Street	Martin Scorsese	
2015
2015	The Fault in Our Stars	Josh Boone	
2015	American Sniper	Clint Eastwood	
2015	Boyhood	Richard Linklater	
2015	Gone Girl	David Fincher	
2015	Guardians of the Galaxy	James Gunn	
2015	The Hunger Games: Mockingjay – Part 1	Francis Lawrence	
2015	Selma	Ava DuVernay	
2015	Whiplash	Damien Chazelle	
2016
2016	Star Wars: The Force Awakens	J. J. Abrams	
2016	Avengers: Age of Ultron	Joss Whedon	
2016	Creed	Ryan Coogler	
2016	Deadpool	Tim Miller	
2016	Jurassic World	Colin Trevorrow	
2016	Straight Outta Compton	F. Gary Gray	
2017
2017	Beauty and the Beast	Bill Condon	
2017	The Edge of Seventeen	Kelly Fremon Craig	
2017	Get Out	Jordan Peele	
2017	Logan	James Mangold	
2017	Rogue One: A Star Wars Story	Gareth Edwards	
2018
2018	Black Panther	Ryan Coogler	
2018	Avengers: Infinity War	Anthony and Joe Russo	
2018	Girls Trip	Malcolm D. Lee	
2018	It	Andy Muschietti	
2018	Wonder Woman	Patty Jenkins	
2019	Avengers: Endgame	Anthony and Joe Russo	
2019	BlacKkKlansman	Spike Lee	
2019	Spider-Man: Into the Spider-Verse	Bob Persichetti, Peter Ramsey and Rodney Rothman	
2019	To All the Boys I've Loved Before	Susan Johnson	
2019	Us	Jordan Peele	

=== 2020s ===
Year	Nominees	Director	Ref
2021	To All the Boys: Always and Forever	Michael Fimognari	
2021	Borat Subsequent Moviefilm	Jason Woliner	
2021	Judas and the Black Messiah	Shaka King	
2021	Promising Young Woman	Emerald Fennell	
2021	Soul	Pete Docter	
2022
2022	Spider-Man: No Way Home	Jon Watts	
2022	Dune	Denis Villeneuve	
2022	Scream	Matt Bettinelli-Olpin, Tyler Gillett	
2022	Shang-Chi and the Legend of the Ten Rings	Destin Daniel Cretton	
2022	The Adam Project	Shawn Levy	
2022	The Batman	Matt Reeves	
2023	Scream VI	Matt Bettinelli-Olpin, Tyler Gillett	
2023	Avatar: The Way of Water	James Cameron	
2023	Black Panther: Wakanda Forever	Ryan Coogler	
2023	Elvis	Baz Luhrmann	
2023	Nope	Jordan Peele	
2023	Smile	Parker Finn	
2023	Top Gun: Maverick	Joseph Kosinski	

== Records ==
Films that won Best Movie at the MTV Movie & TV Awards and Best Picture at the Academy Awards

- 1998: Titanic
- 2001: Gladiator
- 2004: The Lord of the Rings: The Return of the King

Franchise or film series that have won Best Movie more than once

- The Twilight Saga: 2009, 2010, 2011, 2012
- Marvel Cinematic Universe: Avengers (2013, 2019), Black Panther (2018), Spider-Man (2022)
- The Lord of the Rings: 2002, 2003, 2004
- Scream: 1997, 2023
