= MTV Movie Award for Best On-Screen Duo =

US film award

The following is a list of the MTV Movie Award winners and nominees for Best Duo. The award was given from 1996 to 2000 as Best On-Screen Duo, and 2001 to 2006 as Best On-Screen Team. It returned in 2016 as Best Cast, before returning as Best On-Screen Duo from 2013 to 2015, Ensemble Cast in 2016, Best Duo in 2017, and Best On-Screen Team in 2018. It was replaced with Best Team in 2022, and Best Duo in 2023.

== Winners and nominees ==
=== 1992–2000: Best On-Screen Duo ===
Year	Nominees	Cast members
1992	Wayne's World	Dana Carvey and Mike Myers
1992	The Last Boy Scout	Damon Wayans and Bruce Willis
1992	My Girl	Anna Chlumsky and Macaulay Culkin
1992	Robin Hood: Prince of Thieves	Kevin Costner and Morgan Freeman
1992	Thelma & Louise	Geena Davis and Susan Sarandon
1993	Lethal Weapon 3	Mel Gibson and Danny Glover
1993	Basic Instinct	Michael Douglas and Sharon Stone
1993	The Bodyguard	Kevin Costner and Whitney Houston
1993	Far and Away	Tom Cruise and Nicole Kidman
1993	White Men Can't Jump	Woody Harrelson and Wesley Snipes
1994	The Fugitive	Harrison Ford and Tommy Lee Jones
1994	Benny & Joon	Johnny Depp and Mary Stuart Masterson
1994	Philadelphia	Tom Hanks and Denzel Washington
1994	Sleepless in Seattle	Tom Hanks and Meg Ryan
1994	Wayne's World 2	Dana Carvey and Mike Myers
1995	Speed	Sandra Bullock and Keanu Reeves
1995	Dumb & Dumber	Jim Carrey and Jeff Daniels
1995	Interview with the Vampire	Tom Cruise and Brad Pitt
1995	Natural Born Killers	Juliette Lewis and Woody Harrelson
1995	Pulp Fiction	Samuel L. Jackson and John Travolta
1996	Tommy Boy	Chris Farley and David Spade
1996	Bad Boys	Will Smith and Martin Lawrence
1996	Friday	Ice Cube and Chris Tucker
1996	Seven	Morgan Freeman and Brad Pitt
1996	Toy Story	Tim Allen and Tom Hanks
1997	The Rock	Nicolas Cage and Sean Connery
1997	Beavis and Butt-head Do America	Beavis and Butt-head (Mike Judge)
1997	Fargo	Steve Buscemi and Peter Stormare
1997	Romeo + Juliet	Leonardo DiCaprio and Claire Danes
1997	The Birdcage	Nathan Lane and Robin Williams
1998	Face/Off	John Travolta and Nicolas Cage
1998	Good Will Hunting	Matt Damon and Ben Affleck
1998	Men in Black	Will Smith and Tommy Lee Jones
1998	The Wedding Singer	Adam Sandler and Drew Barrymore
1998	Titanic	Leonardo DiCaprio and Kate Winslet
1999	Rush Hour	Jackie Chan and Chris Tucker
1999	Armageddon	Ben Affleck and Liv Tyler
1999	City of Angels	Nicolas Cage and Meg Ryan
1999	She's All That	Freddie Prinze, Jr., and Rachael Leigh Cook
1999	There's Something About Mary	Ben Stiller and Cameron Diaz
2000	Austin Powers: The Spy Who Shagged Me	Mike Myers and Verne Troyer
2000	Big Daddy	Adam Sandler, and Cole and Dylan Sprouse
2000	The Matrix	Keanu Reeves and Laurence Fishburne
2000	The Sixth Sense	Bruce Willis and Haley Joel Osment
2000	Toy Story 2	Tim Allen and Tom Hanks

=== 2001–2006: Best On-Screen Team ===
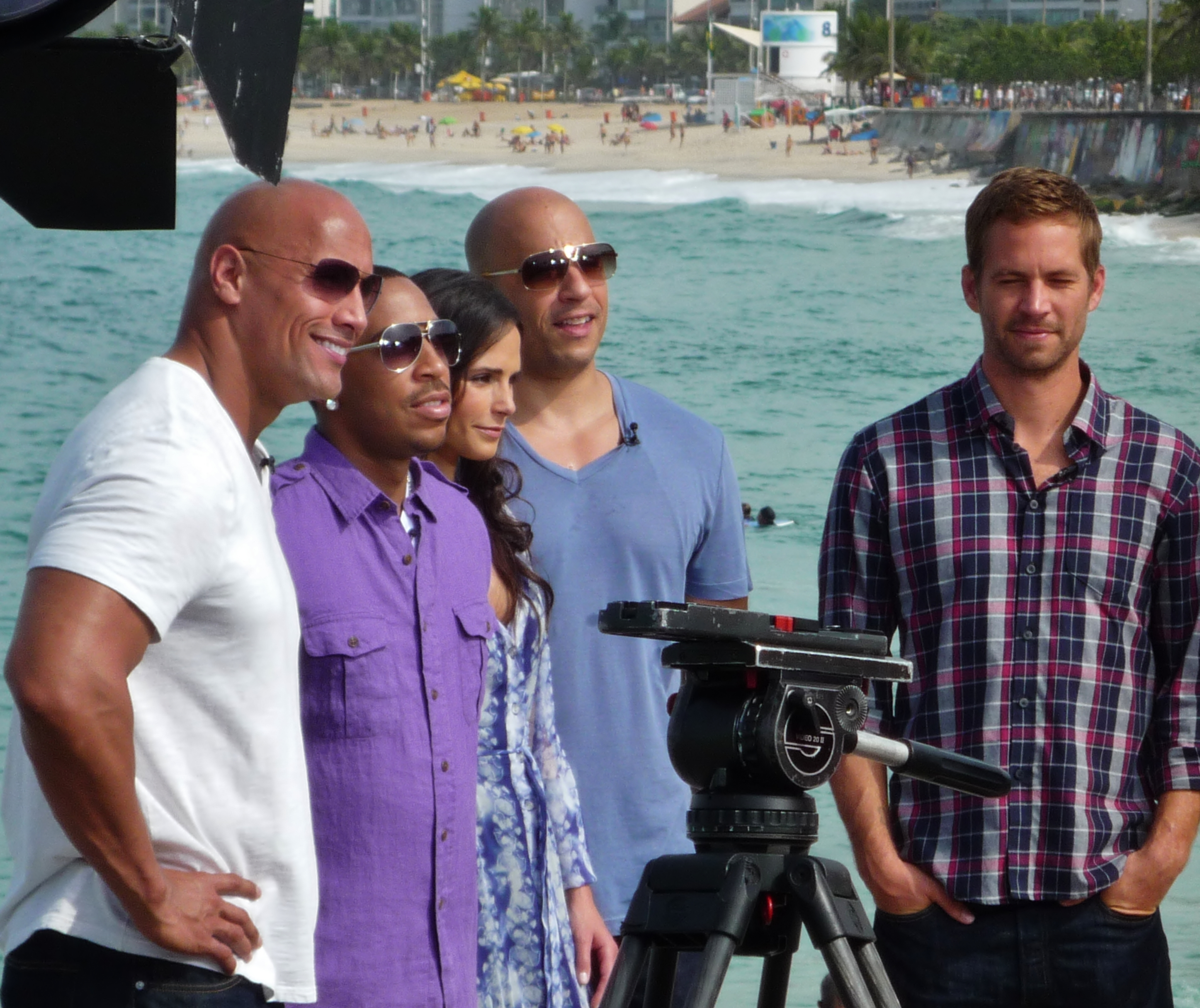
2002 winners on the right side of photo: Paul Walker and Vin Diesel on The Fast and the Furious

Year	Nominees	Cast members
2001	Charlie's Angels	Drew Barrymore, Cameron Diaz, and Lucy Liu
2001	Cast Away	Tom Hanks and Wilson the volleyball
2001	Meet the Parents	Robert De Niro and Ben Stiller
2001	O Brother, Where Art Thou?	George Clooney, Tim Blake Nelson, and John Turturro
2001	X-Men	Halle Berry, Hugh Jackman, James Marsden, and Anna Paquin
2002	The Fast and the Furious	Vin Diesel and Paul Walker
2002	Ocean's Eleven	Casey Affleck, Scott Caan, Don Cheadle, George Clooney, Matt Damon, Elliott Gould, Eddie Jemison, Bernie Mac, Brad Pitt, Shaobo Qin, and Carl Reiner
2002	Rush Hour 2	Jackie Chan and Chris Tucker
2002	Shrek	Cameron Diaz, Eddie Murphy, and Mike Myers
2002	Zoolander	Ben Stiller and Owen Wilson
2003	The Lord of the Rings: The Two Towers	Sean Astin, Andy Serkis, and Elijah Wood
2003	Blue Crush	Kate Bosworth, Michelle Rodriguez, and Sanoe Lake
2003	Jackass: The Movie	Johnny Knoxville, Bam Margera, Steve-O, and Chris Pontius
2003	Old School	Will Ferrell, Vince Vaughn, and Luke Wilson
2003	Shanghai Knights	Jackie Chan and Owen Wilson
2004	50 First Dates	Adam Sandler and Drew Barrymore
2004	Bad Boys II	Will Smith and Martin Lawrence
2004	Pirates of the Caribbean: The Curse of the Black Pearl	Johnny Depp and Orlando Bloom
2004	School of Rock	Jack Black, and the School of Rock Band
2004	Starsky & Hutch	Ben Stiller and Owen Wilson
2005	Mean Girls	Lindsay Lohan, Rachel McAdams, Lacey Chabert, and Amanda Seyfried
2005	Anchorman: The Legend of Ron Burgundy	Will Ferrell, Steve Carell, David Koechner, and Paul Rudd
2005	Dodgeball: A True Underdog Story	Vince Vaughn, Christine Taylor, Justin Long, Alan Tudyk, Stephen Root, Joel David Moore, and Chris Williams
2005	Harold & Kumar Go to White Castle	John Cho and Kal Penn
2005	The Incredibles	Craig T. Nelson, Holly Hunter, Spencer Fox, and Sarah Vowell
2006	Wedding Crashers	Vince Vaughn and Owen Wilson
2006	Fantastic Four	Jessica Alba, Ioan Gruffudd, Chris Evans, and Michael Chiklis
2006	Harry Potter and the Goblet of Fire	Daniel Radcliffe, Emma Watson, and Rupert Grint
2006	The 40-Year-Old Virgin	Steve Carell, Romany Malco, Seth Rogen, and Paul Rudd
2006	The Dukes of Hazzard	Johnny Knoxville, Seann William Scott, and Jessica Simpson

=== 2012: Best Cast ===
2012 winners from left to right: Daniel Radcliffe, Rupert Grint, Emma Watson and Tom Felton on Harry Potter and the Deathly Hallows - Part 2

Year	Nominees	Cast members
2012	Harry Potter and the Deathly Hallows – Part 2	Daniel Radcliffe, Rupert Grint, Emma Watson, and Tom Felton
2012	Bridesmaids	Kristen Wiig, Maya Rudolph, Rose Byrne, Melissa McCarthy, Wendi McLendon-Covey, and Ellie Kemper
2012	The Hunger Games	Jennifer Lawrence, Josh Hutcherson, Liam Hemsworth, Elizabeth Banks, Woody Harrelson, Lenny Kravitz, and Alexander Ludwig
2012	21 Jump Street	Jonah Hill, Channing Tatum, Ice Cube, Dave Franco, Ellie Kemper, Brie Larson, and Rob Riggle
2012	The Help	Emma Stone, Viola Davis, Bryce Dallas Howard, Octavia Spencer, and Jessica Chastain

=== 2013–2015: Best On-Screen Duo ===
Year	Nominees	Cast members
2013
2013	Ted	Mark Wahlberg and Seth MacFarlane
2013	The Avengers	Robert Downey Jr., and Mark Ruffalo
2013	Django Unchained	Leonardo DiCaprio and Samuel L. Jackson
2013	Silver Linings Playbook	Jennifer Lawrence and Bradley Cooper
2014
2014	Fast & Furious 6	Vin Diesel and Paul Walker
2014	American Hustle	Amy Adams and Christian Bale
2014	Dallas Buyers Club	Matthew McConaughey and Jared Leto
2014	Ride Along	Ice Cube and Kevin Hart
2014	The Wolf of Wall Street	Jonah Hill and Leonardo DiCaprio
2015
2015	Neighbors	Zac Efron and Dave Franco
2015	Guardians of the Galaxy	Bradley Cooper and Vin Diesel
2015	22 Jump Street	Channing Tatum and Jonah Hill
2015	The Interview	James Franco and Seth Rogen
2015	The Fault in Our Stars	Shailene Woodley and Ansel Elgort

=== 2016: Ensemble Cast ===
Year	Nominees	Cast members
2016
2016	Pitch Perfect 2	
2016	Avengers: Age of Ultron	
2016	Furious 7	
2016	The Hunger Games: Mockingjay – Part 2	
2016	Star Wars: The Force Awakens	
2016	Trainwreck	

=== 2017: Best Duo ===
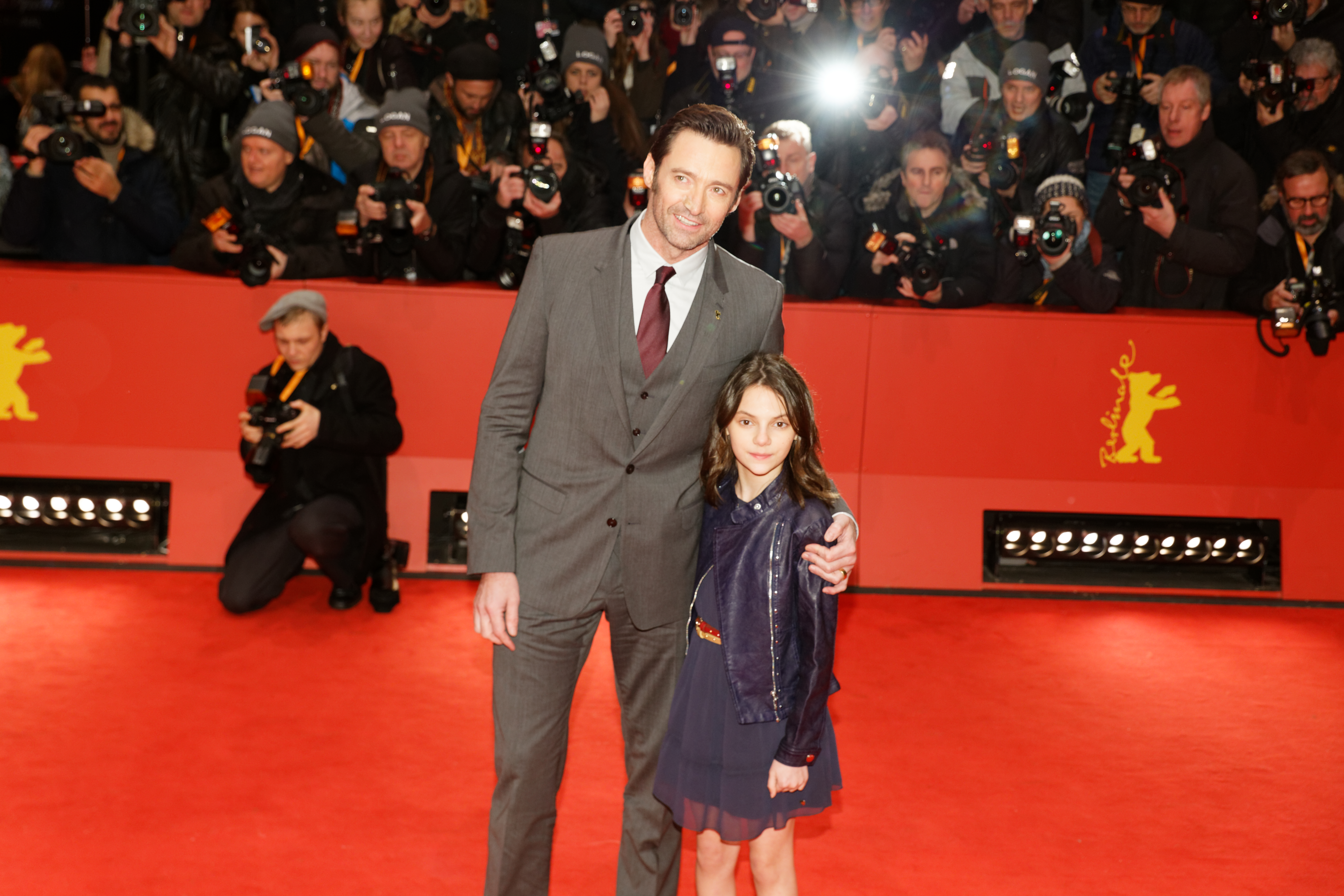
2017 winners Hugh Jackman and Dafne Keen on Logan

Year	Nominees	Cast members
2017
2017	Logan	Hugh Jackman and Dafne Keen
2017	Beauty and the Beast	Josh Gad and Luke Evans
2017	Atlanta	Brian Tyree Henry and Lakeith Stanfield
2017	Get Out	Daniel Kaluuya and Lil Rel Howery
2017	The Voice	Adam Levine and Blake Shelton
2017	Martha & Snoop's Potluck Dinner Party	Martha Stewart and Snoop Dogg

=== 2018: Best On-Screen Team ===
Year	Nominees	Cast members
2018
2018	It	Finn Wolfhard, Sophia Lillis, Jaeden Lieberher, Jack Dylan Grazer, Wyatt Oleff, Jeremy Ray Taylor, and Chosen Jacobs
2018	Black Panther	Chadwick Boseman, Lupita Nyong'o, Danai Gurira, and Letitia Wright
2018	Jumanji: Welcome to the Jungle	Dwayne Johnson, Kevin Hart, Jack Black, Karen Gillan, and Nick Jonas
2018	Ready Player One	Tye Sheridan, Olivia Cooke, Lena Waithe, Philip Zhao, and Win Morisaki
2018	Stranger Things	Gaten Matarazzo, Finn Wolfhard, Caleb McLaughlin, Noah Schnapp, and Sadie Sink

=== 2022: Best Team ===
Year	Nominees	Cast members
2022
2022	Loki	Tom Hiddleston, Sophia Di Martino and Owen Wilson
2022	Only Murders in the Building	Selena Gomez, Steve Martin and Martin Short
2022	Spider-Man: No Way Home	Tom Holland, Andrew Garfield and Tobey Maguire
2022	The Adam Project	Ryan Reynolds and Walker Scobell
2022	The Lost City	Sandra Bullock, Channing Tatum and Brad Pitt

=== 2023: Best Duo ===
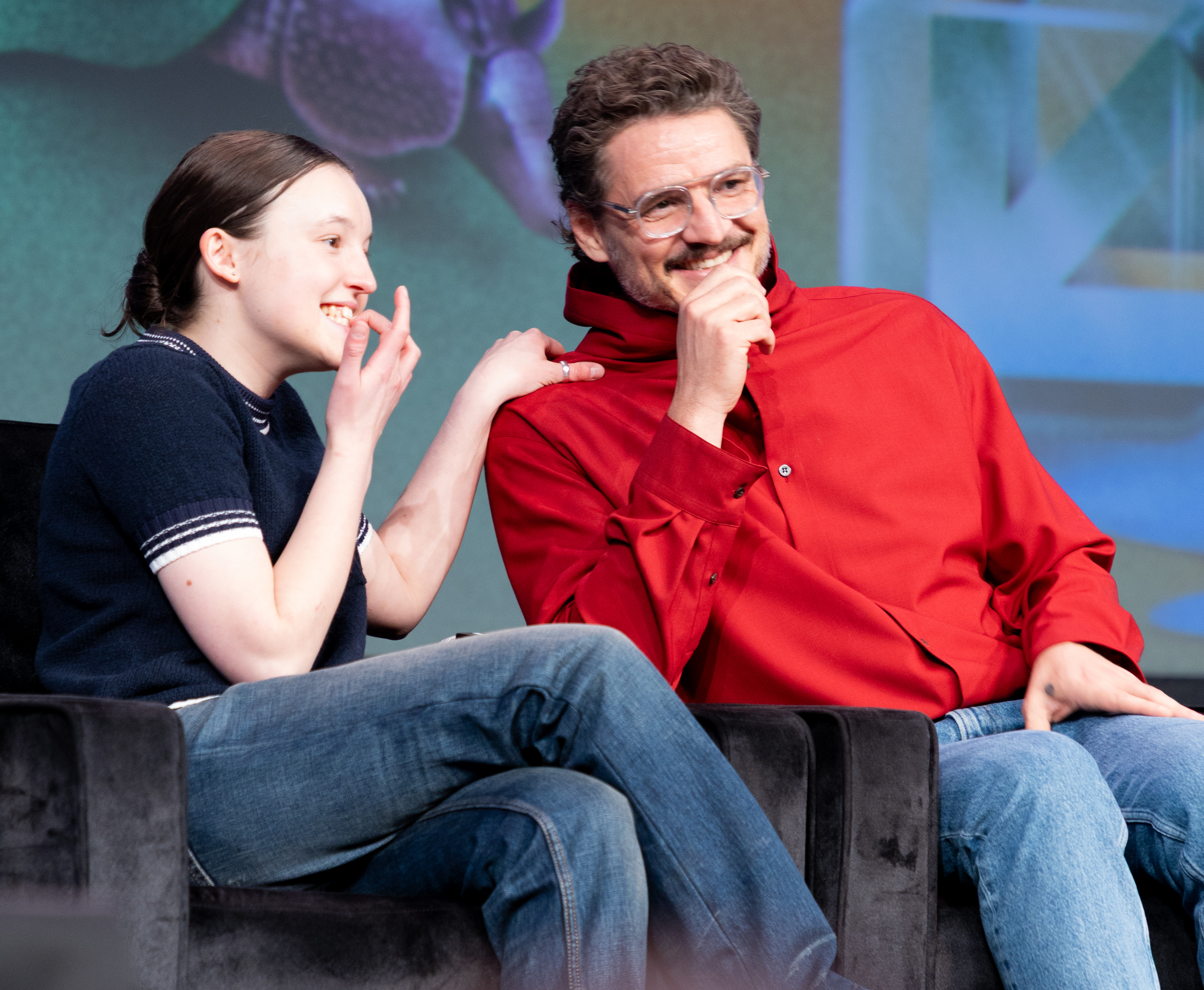
2023 winners Pedro Pascal and Bella Ramsey on The Last of Us

Year	Nominees	Cast members
2023
2023	The Last of Us	Pedro Pascal and Bella Ramsey
2023	Do Revenge	Camila Mendes and Maya Hawke
2023	Wednesday	Jenna Ortega and Victor Dorobantu
2023	The White Lotus	Simona Tabasco and Beatrice Grannò
2023	Top Gun: Maverick	Tom Cruise and Miles Teller
