= MTV Movie Award for Best Comedic Performance =

This is a following list of the MTV Movie Award winners and nominees for Best Comedic Performance. The award was not given in the 2013 ceremony.

== Winners and nominees ==
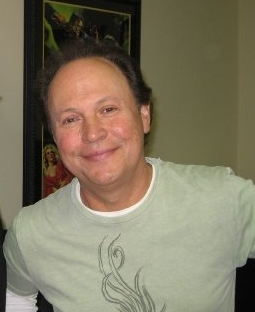
First winner of this award category - Billy Crystal in City Slickers, 1992

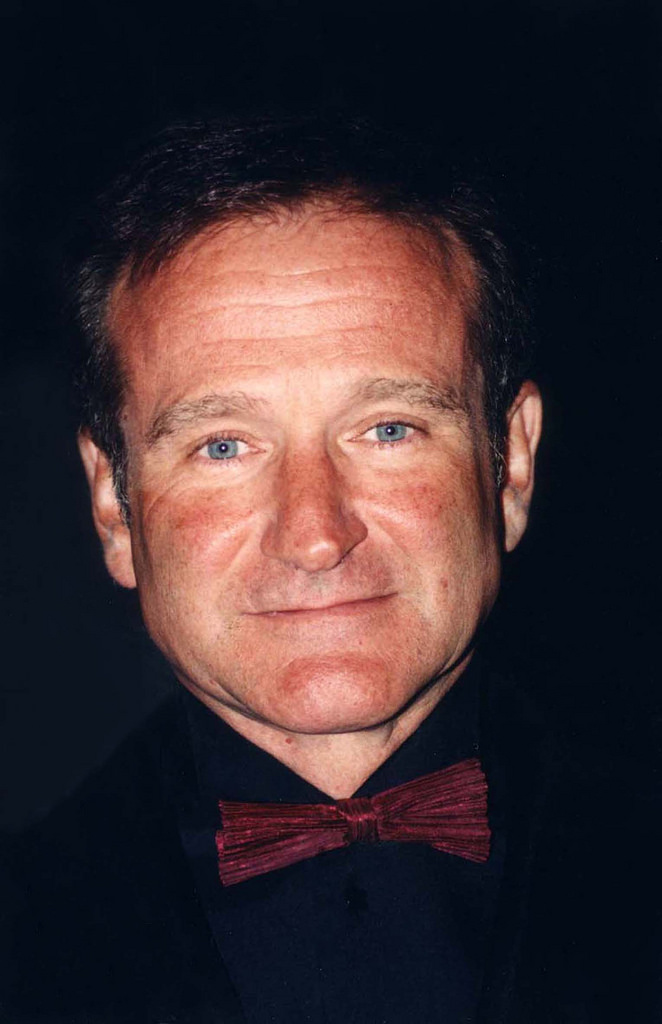
2-time winner Robin Williams on his performances in Aladdin and Mrs. Doubtfire, 1993 & 1994

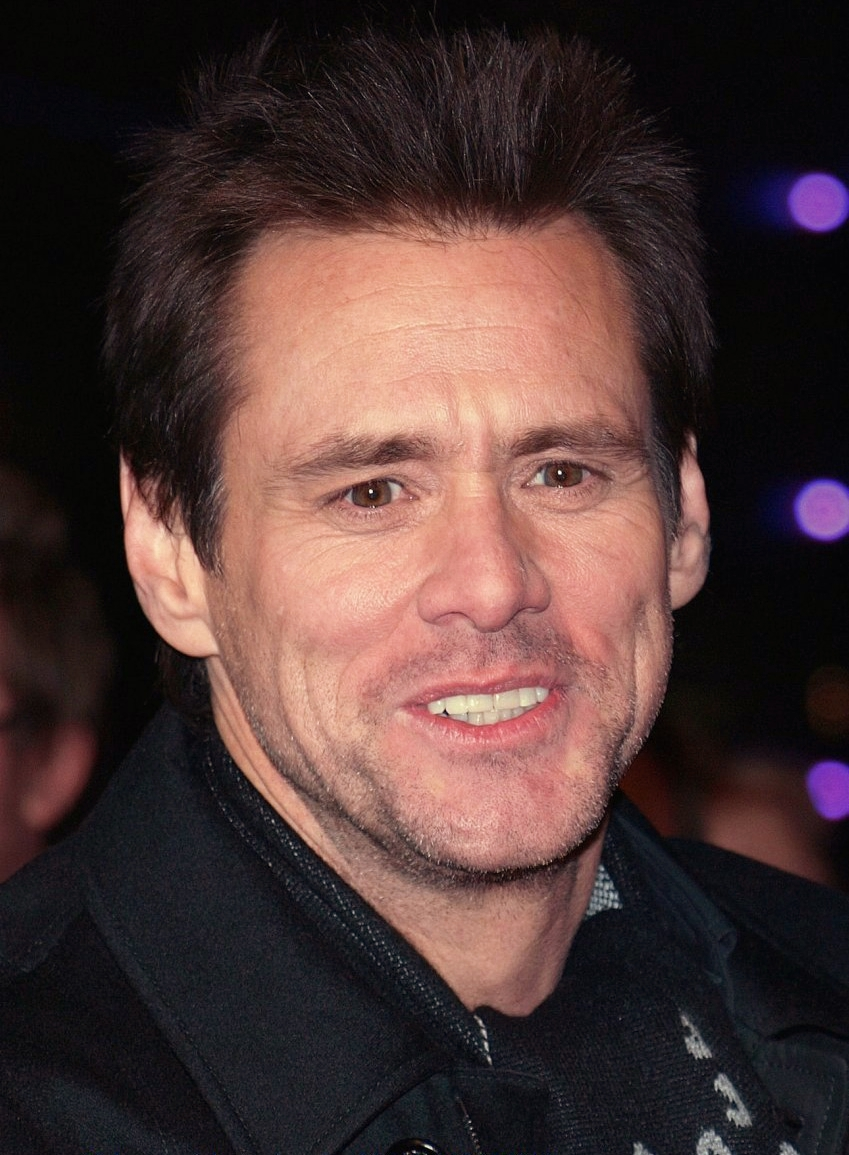
5-time winner Jim Carrey in 1995, 1996, 1997, 1998 and 2009. He broke the record for the number of wins in this award category.

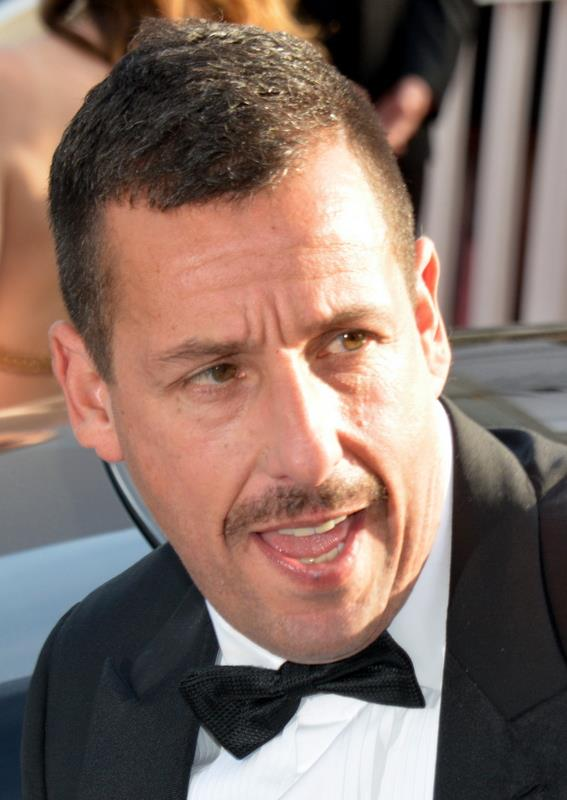
3-time winner Adam Sandler in 1999, 2000 and 2023

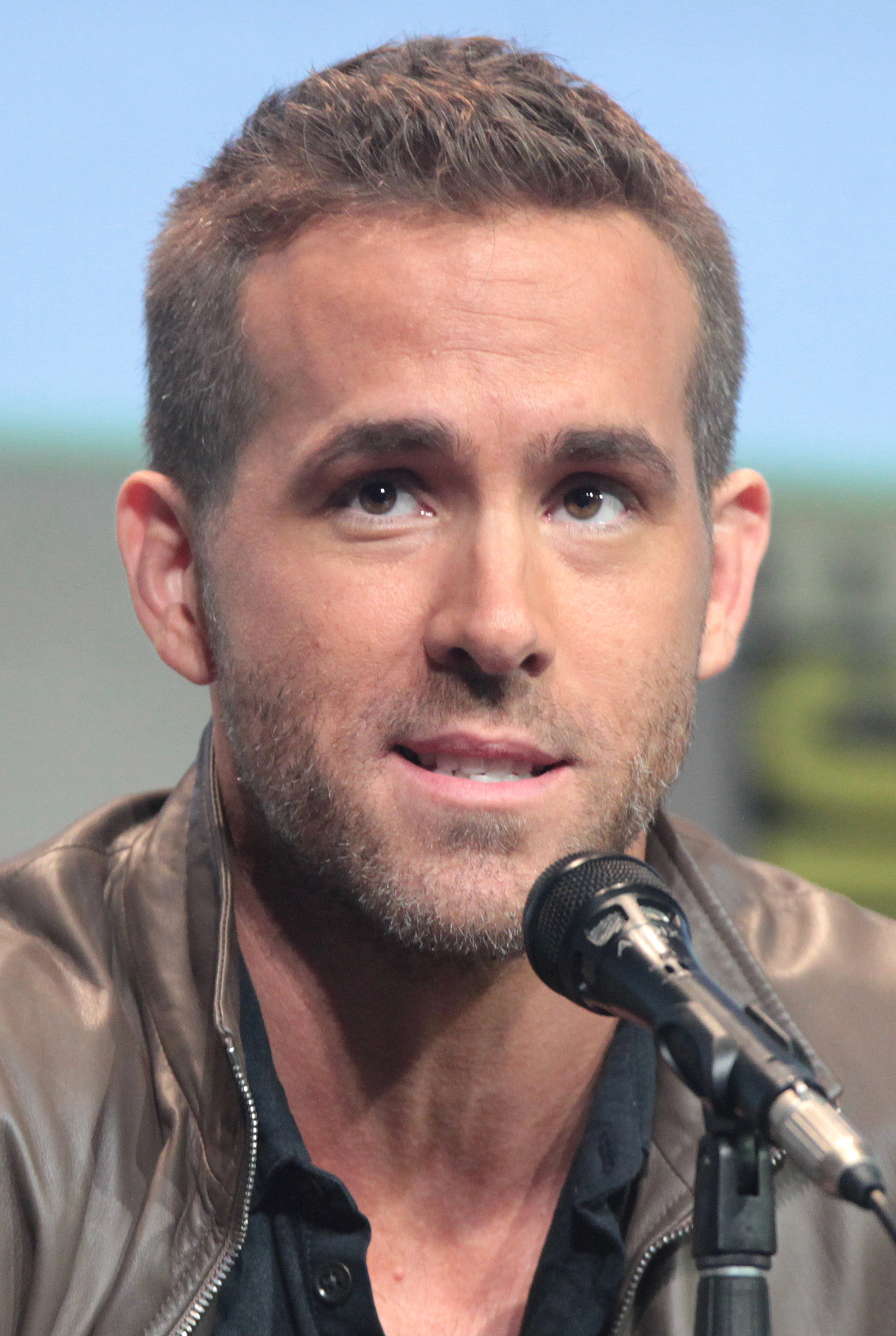
2-times winner Ryan Reynolds on his performances in Deadpool and Free Guy, 2016 & 2022

=== 1990s ===
Year	Winners and nominees	Film	Role	Ref.
1992	Billy Crystal	City Slickers	Mitch Robbins	
1992	Dana Carvey	Wayne's World	Garth Algar	
1992	Steve Martin	Father of the Bride	George Banks	
1992	Bill Murray	What About Bob?	Bob Wiley	
1992	Mike Myers	Wayne's World	Wayne Campbell	
1993	Robin Williams	Aladdin	Genie	
1993	Whoopi Goldberg	Sister Act	Deloris van Cartier	
1993	Eddie Murphy	Boomerang	Marcus Graham	
1993	Bill Murray	Groundhog Day	Phil Connors	
1993	Joe Pesci	My Cousin Vinny	Vincent LaGuardia "Vinny" Gambini	
1994	Robin Williams	Mrs. Doubtfire	Daniel Hillard / Mrs. Doubtfire	
1994	Jim Carrey	Ace Ventura: Pet Detective	Ace Ventura	
1994	Johnny Depp	Benny & Joon	Sam	
1994	Whoopi Goldberg	Sister Act 2: Back in the Habit	Deloris van Cartier	
1994	Pauly Shore	Son in Law	Crawl	
1995	Jim Carrey	Dumb & Dumber	Lloyd Christmas	
1995	Tim Allen	The Santa Clause	Scott Calvin	
1995	Tom Arnold	True Lies	Albert "Gib" Gibson	
1995	Jim Carrey	The Mask	Stanley Ipkiss / The Mask	
1995	Adam Sandler	Billy Madison	Billy Madison	
1996	Jim Carrey	Ace Ventura: When Nature Calls	Ace Ventura	
1996	Chris Farley	Tommy Boy	Thomas R. "Tommy" Callahan	
1996	Adam Sandler	Happy Gilmore	Happy Gilmore	
1996	Alicia Silverstone	Clueless	Cher Horowitz	
1996	Chris Tucker	Friday	Smokey	
1997	Jim Carrey	The Cable Guy	The Cable Guy	
1997	Chris Farley	Beverly Hills Ninja	Haru	
1997	Janeane Garofalo	The Truth About Cats & Dogs	Abby Barnes	
1997	Eddie Murphy	The Nutty Professor	Various Characters	
1997	Robin Williams	The Birdcage	Armand Goldman	
1998	Jim Carrey	Liar Liar	Fletcher Reede	
1998	Rupert Everett	My Best Friend's Wedding	George Downes	
1998	Mike Myers	Austin Powers: International Man of Mystery	Austin Powers / Dr. Evil	
1998	Adam Sandler	The Wedding Singer	Robbie Hart	
1998	Will Smith	Men in Black	Agent J	
1999	Adam Sandler	The Waterboy	Bobby Boucher	
1999	Cameron Diaz	There's Something About Mary	Mary Jensen	
1999	Chris Rock	Lethal Weapon 4	Lee Butters	
1999	Ben Stiller	There's Something About Mary	Ted Stroehmann	
1999	Chris Tucker	Rush Hour	James Carter	

=== 2000s ===
Year	Winners and nominees	Film	Role	Ref.
2000	Adam Sandler	Big Daddy	Sonny Koufax	
2000	Jason Biggs	American Pie	Jim Levenstein	
2000	Ice Cube	Next Friday	Craig Jones	
2000	Mike Myers	Austin Powers: The Spy Who Shagged Me	Austin Powers / Dr. Evil / Fat Bastard	
2000	Parker Posey	Scream 3	Jennifer Jolie	
2001	Ben Stiller	Meet the Parents	Greg Focker	
2001	Jim Carrey	Me, Myself & Irene	Charlie Baileygates / Hank	
2001	Tom Green	Road Trip	Barry	
2001	Martin Lawrence	Big Momma's House	Malcolm Turner / Fake Big Momma	
2001	Eddie Murphy	Nutty Professor II: The Klumps	Various Characters	
2002	Reese Witherspoon	Legally Blonde	Elle Woods	
2002	Eddie Murphy	Shrek	Donkey	
2002	Mike Myers	Shrek	Shrek	
2002	Seann William Scott	American Pie 2	Stifler	
2002	Chris Tucker	Rush Hour 2	James Carter	
2003	Mike Myers	Austin Powers in Goldmember	Austin Powers / Dr. Evil / Goldmember / Fat Bastard	
2003	Cedric the Entertainer	Barbershop	Eddie	
2003	Will Ferrell	Old School	Frank Ricard	
2003	Johnny Knoxville	Jackass: The Movie	Himself	
2003	Adam Sandler	Mr. Deeds	Longfellow Deeds	
2004	Jack Black	School of Rock	Dewey Finn	
2004	Jim Carrey	Bruce Almighty	Bruce Nolan	
2004	Ellen DeGeneres	Finding Nemo	Dory	
2004	Johnny Depp	Pirates of the Caribbean: The Curse of the Black Pearl	Jack Sparrow	
2004	Will Ferrell	Elf	Buddy the Elf	
2005	Dustin Hoffman	Meet the Fockers	Bernie Focker	
2005	Antonio Banderas	Shrek 2	Puss in Boots	
2005	Will Ferrell	Anchorman: The Legend of Ron Burgundy	Ron Burgundy	
2005	Will Smith	Hitch	Alex "Hitch" Hitchens	
2005	Ben Stiller	Dodgeball: A True Underdog Story	White Goodman	
2006	Steve Carell	The 40-Year-Old Virgin	Andy Stitzer	
2006	Tyler Perry	Madea's Family Reunion	Madea	
2006	Adam Sandler	The Longest Yard	Paul Crewe	
2006	Vince Vaughn	Wedding Crashers	Jeremy Grey	
2006	Owen Wilson	Wedding Crashers	John Beckwith	
2007	Sacha Baron Cohen	Borat	Borat Sagdiyev	
2007	Emily Blunt	The Devil Wears Prada	Emily Charlton	
2007	Will Ferrell	Blades of Glory	Chazz Michael Michaels	
2007	Adam Sandler	Click	Michael Newman	
2007	Ben Stiller	Night at the Museum	Larry Daley	
2008	Johnny Depp	Pirates of the Caribbean: At World's End	Jack Sparrow	
2008	Amy Adams	Enchanted	Princess Giselle	
2008	Jonah Hill	Superbad	Seth	
2008	Seth Rogen	Knocked Up	Ben Stone	
2008	Adam Sandler	I Now Pronounce You Chuck & Larry	Chuck Levine	
2009	Jim Carrey	Yes Man	Carl Allen	
2009	Steve Carell	Get Smart	Maxwell Smart	
2009	Anna Faris	The House Bunny	Shelley Darlington	
2009	James Franco	Pineapple Express	Saul Silver	
2009	Amy Poehler	Baby Mama	Angie Ostrowski	

=== 2010s ===
Year	Winners and nominees	Film	Role	Ref.
2010	Zach Galifianakis	The Hangover	Alan Garner	
2010	Sandra Bullock	The Proposal	Margaret Tate	
2010	Bradley Cooper	The Hangover	Phil Wenneck	
2010	Ryan Reynolds	The Proposal	Andrew Paxton	
2010	Ben Stiller	Night at the Museum: Battle of the Smithsonian	Larry Daley	
2011	Emma Stone	Easy A	Olive Penderghast	
2011	Russell Brand	Get Him to the Greek	Aldous Snow	
2011	Will Forte	MacGruber	MacGruber	
2011	Zach Galifianakis	Due Date	Ethan Tremblay / Ethan Chase	
2011	Ashton Kutcher	No Strings Attached	Adam Franklin	
2011	Adam Sandler	Just Go with It	Danny Maccabee	
2012	Melissa McCarthy	Bridesmaids	Megan Price	
2012	Jonah Hill	21 Jump Street	Morton Schmidt	
2012	Kristen Wiig	Bridesmaids	Annie Walker	
2012	Oliver Cooper	Project X	Costa	
2012	Zach Galifianakis	The Hangover Part II	Alan Garner	
2014	Jonah Hill	The Wolf of Wall Street	Donnie Azoff	
2014	Jason Sudeikis	We're the Millers	David Clark	
2014	Johnny Knoxville	Jackass Presents: Bad Grandpa	Irving Zisman	
2014	Kevin Hart	Ride Along	Ben Barber	
2014	Melissa McCarthy	The Heat	Shannon Mullins	
2014	Simon Pegg	The World's End	Gary King	
2015	Channing Tatum	22 Jump Street	Greg Jenko	
2015	Chris Pratt	Guardians of the Galaxy	Peter Quill / Star-Lord	
2015	Chris Rock	Top Five	Andre Allen	
2015	Kevin Hart	The Wedding Ringer	Jimmy Callahan	
2015	Rose Byrne	Neighbors	Kelly Radner	
2016	Ryan Reynolds	Deadpool	Wade Wilson / Deadpool	
2016	Amy Schumer	Trainwreck	Amy Townsend	
2016	Kevin Hart	Ride Along 2	Ben Barber	
2016	Melissa McCarthy	Spy	Susan Cooper	
2016	Rebel Wilson	Pitch Perfect 2	Fat Amy	
2016	Will Ferrell	Get Hard	James King	
2017	Lil Rel Howery	Get Out	Rod Williams	
2017	Will Arnett	The Lego Batman Movie	Batman	
2017	Adam DeVine	Workaholics	Adam Dwayne DeMamp	
2017	Ilana Glazer, Abbi Jacobson	Broad City	Ilana Wexler, & Abbi Abrams	
2017	Seth Rogen	Sausage Party	Frank the Sausage	
2017	Seth MacFarlane	Family Guy	Peter Griffin, Stewie Griffin, Brian Griffin, Glenn Quagmire, Tom Tucker, Carter Pewterschmidt, Dr. Elmer Hartman, Seamus, Kevin Swanson, Jesus, others	
2018	Tiffany Haddish	Girls Trip	Dina	
2018	Jack Black	Jumanji: Welcome to the Jungle	Sheldon "Shelly" Oberon	
2018	Dan Levy	Schitt's Creek	David Rose	
2018	Kate McKinnon	Saturday Night Live, Rough Night, The Magic School Bus Rides Again	Various, Pippa, Miss Fiona Felicity Frizzle	
2018	Amy Schumer	I Feel Pretty	Renee Bennett	
2019
2019	Dan Levy	Schitt's Creek	David Rose	
2019	Awkwafina	Crazy Rich Asians	Goh Peik Lin	
2019	Marsai Martin	Little	Jordan Sanders	
2019	John Mulaney	Big Mouth	Andrew Glouberman	
2019	Zachary Levi	Shazam!	Shazam	

=== 2020s ===
Year	Nominee	Show	Role	Ref
2021	Leslie Jones	Coming 2 America	Mary Junson	
2021	Eric Andre	Bad Trip	Chris Carey	
2021	Annie Murphy	Schitt's Creek	Alexis Rose	
2021	Issa Rae	Insecure	Issa Dee	
2021	Jason Sudeikis	Ted Lasso	Ted Lasso	
2022	Ryan Reynolds	Free Guy	Guy	
2022	John Cena	Peacemaker	Peacemaker	
2022	Brett Goldstein	Ted Lasso	Roy Kent	
2022	Johnny Knoxville	Jackass Forever	Himself	
2022	Megan Stalter	Hacks	Kayla	
2023	Adam Sandler	Murder Mystery 2	Nick Spitz	
2023	Quinta Brunson	Abbott Elementary	Janine Teagues	
2023	Jennifer Coolidge	Shotgun Wedding	Carol Fowler	
2023	Dylan O'Brien	Not Okay	Colin	
2023	Keke Palmer	Nope	Emerald "Em" Haywood	
