= MTV Movie Award for Best On-Screen Transformation =

The MTV Movie Award for Best On-Screen Transformation is an award presented to an actor/actress for transformation in films at the MTV Movie Awards, a ceremony established in 1992. The MTV Movie Award for Best On-Screen Transformation was first given out in 2012 for Elizabeth Banks's transformation in the film The Hunger Games.

== Best On-Screen Transformation ==
=== 2010s ===
Year	Artist	Film	Other nominees	Ref.
2012	Elizabeth Banks	The Hunger Games	Rooney Mara—The Girl With the Dragon Tattoo; Johnny Depp—21 Jump Street; Michelle Williams—My Week with Marilyn; Colin Farrell—Horrible Bosses	
2014	Jared Leto	Dallas Buyers Club	Christian Bale—American Hustle; Elizabeth Banks—The Hunger Games: Catching Fire; Matthew McConaughey—Dallas Buyers Club; Orlando Bloom—The Hobbit: The Desolation of Smaug	
2015	Elizabeth Banks	The Hunger Games: Mockingjay – Part 1	Steve Carell—Foxcatcher; Ellar Coltrane—Boyhood; Eddie Redmayne—The Theory of Everything; Zoe Saldaña—Guardians of the Galaxy	
