= MTV Movie Award for Best Hero =

Film award category

The MTV Movie Award for Best Hero was introduced in 2006, but retired the next year, and reinstated in 2012. A similar category titled Biggest Badass Star was introduced in 2010, nominating only the actor, and not the movie. Daniel Radcliffe is the first recipient to win both this and Best Villain. Dwayne Johnson, Ewan McGregor and Tom Cruise have each received nominations in both categories, but never won in either. In 2021, four years after the award became the MTV Movie & TV Award for Best Hero, Anthony Mackie was the first TV recipient to win.

== Winners and nominees ==
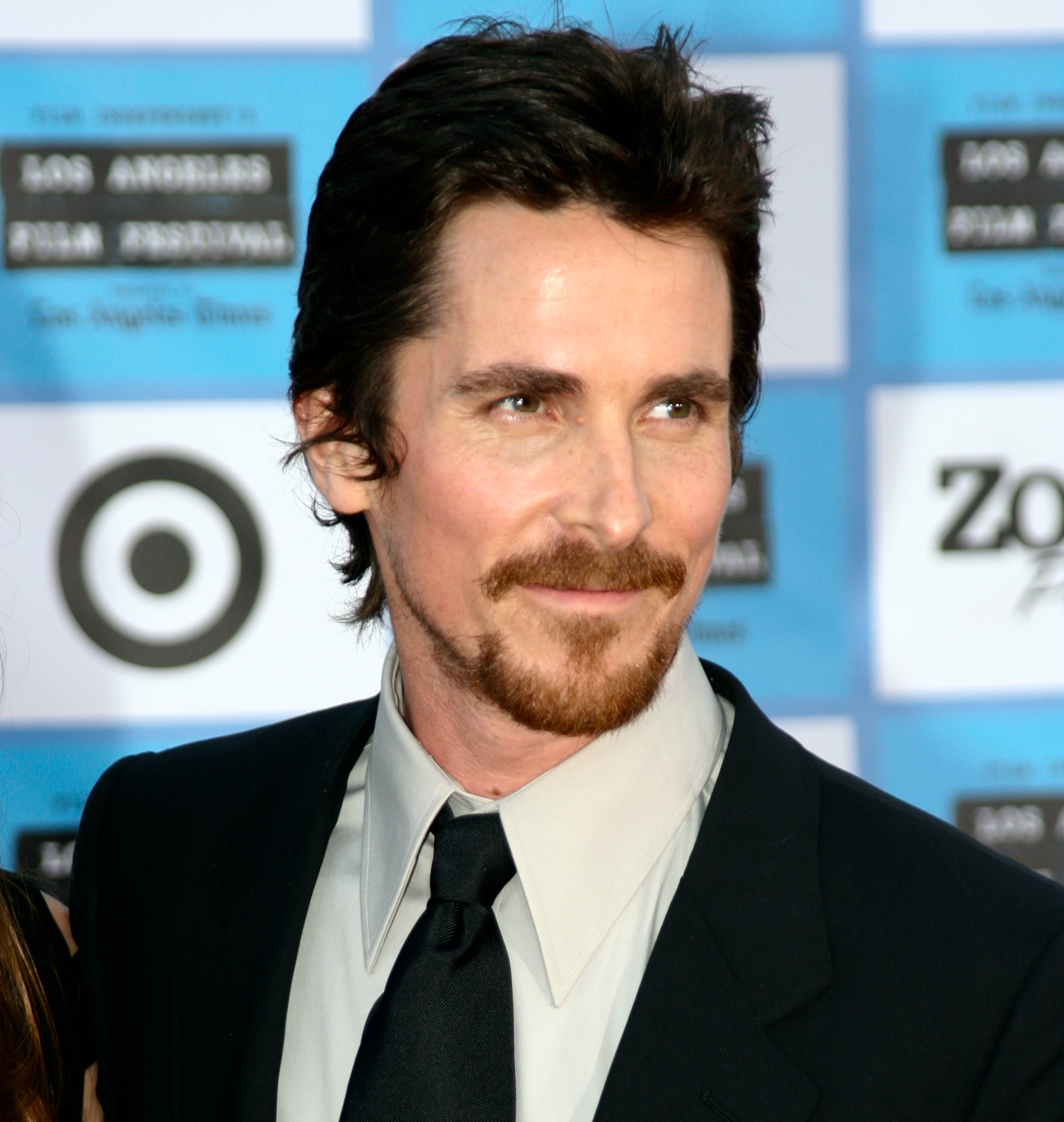
First winner of this award category Christian Bale about his main performance as Bruce Wayne / Batman in Batman Begins, 2006

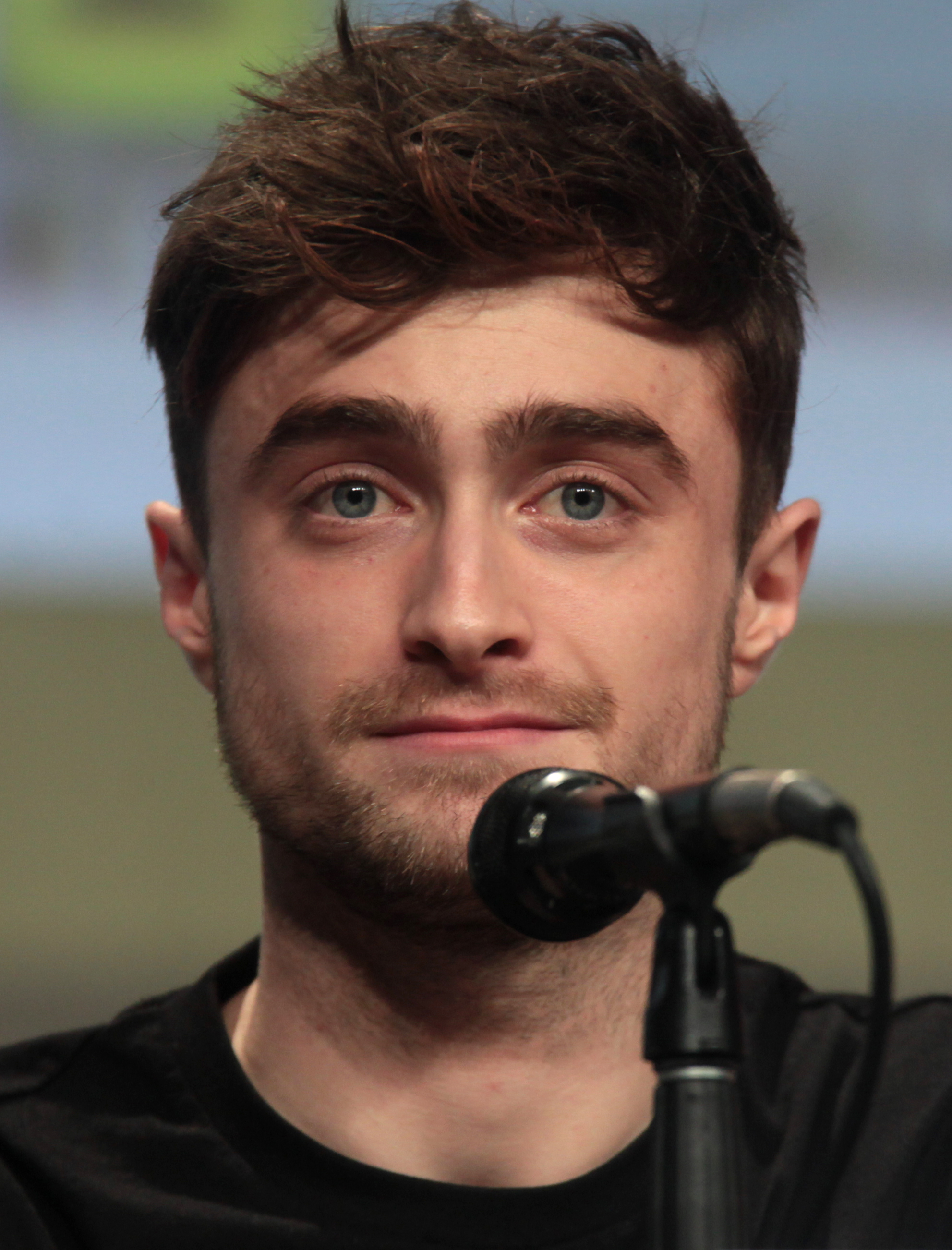
2012 winner Daniel Radcliffe on his main performance as Harry Potter in Harry Potter and the Deathly Hallows - Part 2

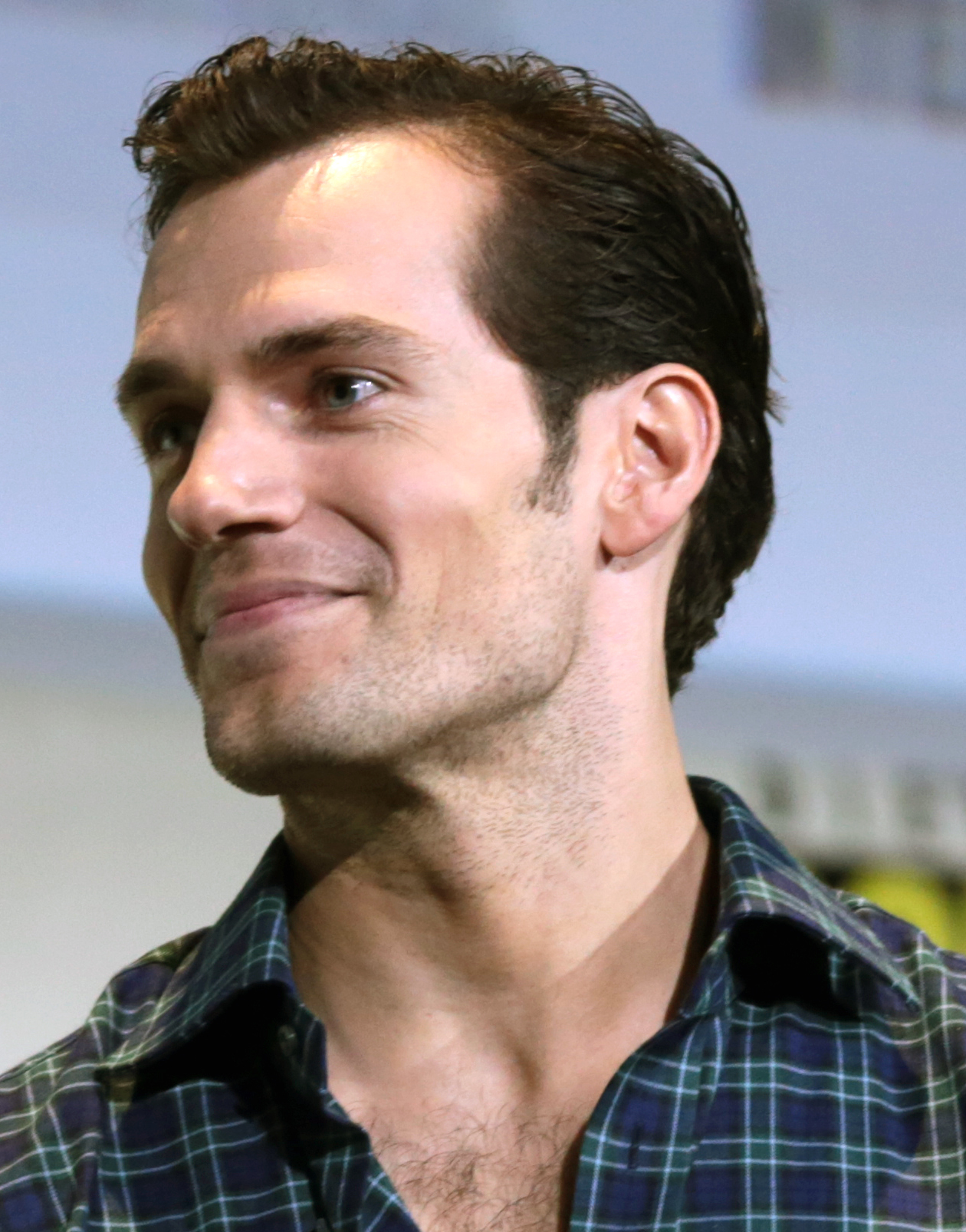
2014 winner Henry Cavill on his main performance as Clark Kent / Superman in Man of Steel

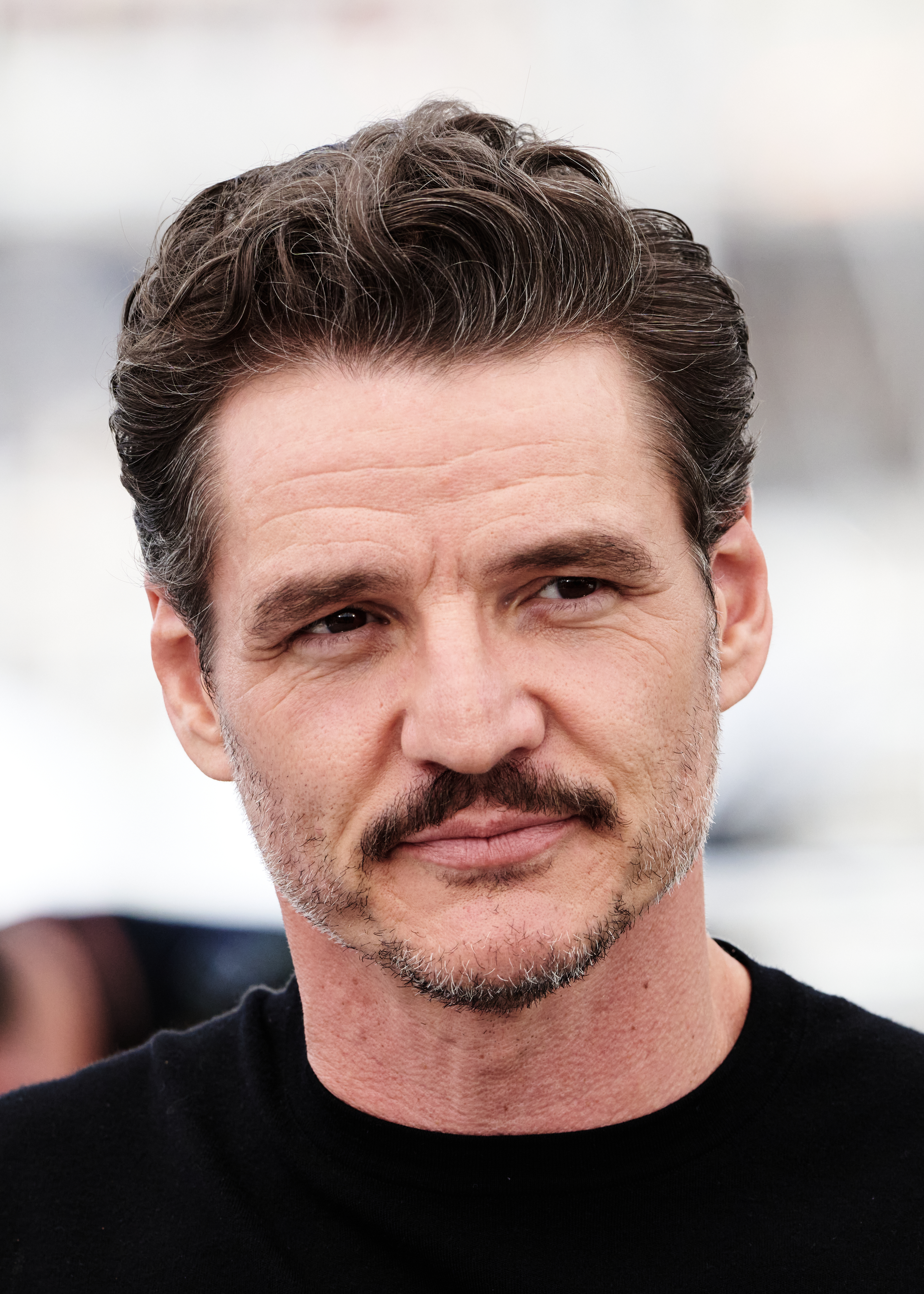
Most recent winner in 2023 Pedro Pascal on his main performance as Joel Miller in The Last of Us

=== Best Hero ===
Table key
‡	Indicates the winner

Year	Actor	Film	Role(s)	Ref
2006	Christian Bale ‡	Batman Begins	Bruce Wayne / Batman	
2006	Jessica Alba	Fantastic Four	Sue Storm / Invisible Woman	
2006	Kate Beckinsale	Underworld: Evolution	Selene	
2006	Ewan McGregor	Star Wars: Episode III – Revenge of the Sith	Obi-Wan Kenobi	
2006	Daniel Radcliffe	Harry Potter and the Goblet of Fire	Harry Potter	
2012	Daniel Radcliffe ‡	Harry Potter and the Deathly Hallows – Part 2	Harry Potter	
2012	Chris Evans	Captain America: The First Avenger	Steve Rogers / Captain America	
2012	Chris Hemsworth	Thor	Thor	
2012	Jennifer Lawrence	The Hunger Games	Katniss Everdeen	
2012	Channing Tatum	21 Jump Street	Greg Jenko	
2013	Martin Freeman ‡	The Hobbit: An Unexpected Journey	Bilbo Baggins	
2013	Christian Bale	The Dark Knight Rises	Bruce Wayne / Batman	
2013	Robert Downey Jr.	The Avengers	Tony Stark / Iron Man	
2013	Anne Hathaway	The Dark Knight Rises	Selina Kyle / Catwoman	
2013	Kristen Stewart	Snow White and the Huntsman	Snow White	
2014	Henry Cavill ‡	Man of Steel	Clark Kent / Superman	
2014	Robert Downey Jr.	Iron Man 3	Tony Stark / Iron Man	
2014	Martin Freeman	The Hobbit: The Desolation of Smaug	Bilbo Baggins	
2014	Chris Hemsworth	Thor: The Dark World	Thor	
2014	Channing Tatum	White House Down	John Cale	
2015	Dylan O'Brien ‡	The Maze Runner	Thomas	
2015	Martin Freeman	The Hobbit: The Battle of the Five Armies	Bilbo Baggins	
2015	Jennifer Lawrence	The Hunger Games: Mockingjay – Part 1	Katniss Everdeen	
2015	Chris Pratt	Guardians of the Galaxy	Peter Quill / Star-Lord	
2015	Shailene Woodley	The Divergent Series: Insurgent	Beatrice "Tris" Prior	
2016	Jennifer Lawrence ‡	The Hunger Games: Mockingjay – Part 2	Katniss Everdeen	
2016	Chris Evans	Avengers: Age of Ultron	Steve Rogers / Captain America	
2016	Dwayne Johnson	San Andreas	Ray Gaines	
2016	Daisy Ridley	Star Wars: The Force Awakens	Rey	
2016	Paul Rudd	Ant-Man	Scott Lang / Ant-Man	
2016	Charlize Theron	Mad Max: Fury Road	Imperator Furiosa	
2017	Taraji P. Henson ‡	Hidden Figures	Katherine Goble Johnson	
2017	Stephen Amell	Arrow	Oliver Queen / Green Arrow	
2017	Millie Bobby Brown	Stranger Things	Jane Ives-Hopper / Eleven	
2017	Mike Colter	Luke Cage	Luke Cage	
2017	Grant Gustin	The Flash	Barry Allen / Flash	
2017	Felicity Jones	Rogue One: A Star Wars Story	Jyn Erso	
2018	Chadwick Boseman ‡	Black Panther	T'Challa / Black Panther	
2018	Emilia Clarke	Game of Thrones	Daenerys Targaryen	
2018	Gal Gadot	Wonder Woman	Diana Prince / Wonder Woman	
2018	Grant Gustin	The Flash	Barry Allen / Flash	
2018	Daisy Ridley	Star Wars: The Last Jedi	Rey	
2019	Robert Downey Jr. ‡	Avengers: Endgame	Tony Stark / Iron Man	
2019	Brie Larson	Captain Marvel	Carol Danvers / Captain Marvel	
2019	Zachary Levi	Shazam!	Billy Batson / Shazam	
2019	John David Washington	BlacKkKlansman	Ron Stallworth	
2019	Maisie Williams	Game of Thrones	Arya Stark	
2021	Anthony Mackie ‡	The Falcon and the Winter Soldier	Sam Wilson / Falcon	
2021	Gal Gadot	Wonder Woman 1984	Diana Prince / Wonder Woman	
2021	Teyonah Parris	WandaVision	Monica Rambeau	
2021	Pedro Pascal	The Mandalorian	Din Djarin / The Mandalorian	
2021	Jack Quaid	The Boys	Hughie Campbell	
2022	Scarlett Johansson ‡	Black Widow	Natasha Romanoff / Black Widow	
2022	Daniel Craig	No Time to Die	James Bond	
2022	Oscar Isaac	Moon Knight	Marc Spector / Moon Knight, Steven Grant / Mr. Knight and Jake Lockley	
2022	Simu Liu	Shang-Chi and the Legend of the Ten Rings	Xu Shang-Chi	
2022	Tom Holland	Spider-Man: No Way Home	Peter Parker / Spider-Man	
2023	Pedro Pascal ‡	The Last of Us	Joel Miller	
2023	Tom Cruise	Top Gun: Maverick	Captain Pete "Maverick" Mitchell	
2023	Diego Luna	Andor	Cassian Andor	
2023	Jenna Ortega	Wednesday	Wednesday Addams	
2023	Paul Rudd	Ant-Man and the Wasp: Quantumania	Scott Lang / Ant-Man	

=== Biggest Badass Star ===
Table key
‡	Indicates the winner

Year	Actor	Ref
2010	Rain ‡	
2010	Angelina Jolie	
2010	Chris Pine	
2010	Channing Tatum	
2010	Sam Worthington	
2011	Chloë Grace Moretz ‡	
2011	Robert Downey Jr.	
2011	Joseph Gordon-Levitt	
2011	Alex Pettyfer	
2011	Jaden Smith	
