= 2012 MTV Movie Awards =

American awards show

- Date: Sunday, June 3, 2012
- Location: Gibson Amphitheatre, Universal City, California
- Country: United States
- Hosted by: Russell Brand
- Website: http://www.mtv.com/ontv/movieawards/2012/

Television/radio coverage
- Network: MTV, MTV2, VH1, and Logo
- Produced by: Den of Thieves
- Directed by: Hamish Hamilton

The 2012 MTV Movie Awards were held on June 3, 2012 at the Gibson Amphitheatre in Universal City, California, hosted by Russell Brand.

The nominees were announced on May 1, and the winners were chosen by fans and a panel of MTV executives. On May 10, Russell Brand was announced to host the 2012 show.

== Performers ==
- Martin Solveig (DJ Host)
- fun. featuring Janelle Monáe — "We Are Young"
- Wiz Khalifa — "Work Hard, Play Hard"
- The Black Keys featuring Johnny Depp — "Gold on the Ceiling" and "Lonely Boy"

== Presenters ==
- Mark Wahlberg and Mila Kunis — presented Best On-Screen Dirt Bag
- Andrew Garfield and Emma Stone — presented Breakthrough Performance
- Logan Lerman, Ezra Miller, and Emma Watson — presented Best Male Performance
- Kristen Stewart and Chris Hemsworth — presented Best Female Performance
- Charlie Sheen — presented the Instant Cult Classics: Party Movie Basics segment, and Wiz Khalifa
- Adam Sandler, Andy Samberg, and Leighton Meester — presented Best Kiss
- Joe Perry and Steven Tyler — presented MTV Generation Award, and The Black Keys
- Michael Fassbender and Charlize Theron — presented Best Fight
- Kate Beckinsale and Jessica Biel — presented Best Cast
- Matthew McConaughey, Channing Tatum, and Joe Manganiello — presented Best On-Screen Transformation
- Martha MacIsaac, Steve Carell, Anna Faris, Jim Carrey, Octavia Spencer, Mila Kunis, and Jason Sudeikis — presented MTV Trailblazer Award
- Christian Bale, Joseph Gordon-Levitt, Gary Oldman, and Christopher Nolan — presented an exclusive sneak peek of The Dark Knight Rises
- Jodie Foster — presented Movie of the Year

== Awards ==
Movie of the Year
The Twilight Saga: Breaking Dawn: Part 1; Bridesmaids; The Hunger Games; Harry Potter and the Deathly Hallows – Part 2; The Help
Best Male Performance	Best Female Performance
Josh Hutcherson – The Hunger Games; Joseph Gordon-Levitt – 50/50; Ryan Gosling – Drive; Daniel Radcliffe – Harry Potter and the Deathly Hallows – Part 2; Channing Tatum – The Vow	Jennifer Lawrence – The Hunger Games; Rooney Mara – The Girl With the Dragon Tattoo; Emma Stone – Crazy, Stupid, Love; Emma Watson – Harry Potter and the Deathly Hallows – Part 2; Kristen Wiig – Bridesmaids
Breakthrough Performance	Best Comedic Performance
Shailene Woodley – The Descendants; Elle Fanning – Super 8; Melissa McCarthy – Bridesmaids; Rooney Mara – The Girl With the Dragon Tattoo; Liam Hemsworth – The Hunger Games	Melissa McCarthy – Bridesmaids; Jonah Hill – 21 Jump Street; Kristen Wiig – Bridesmaids; Oliver Cooper – Project X; Russell Brand – Hop
Best On-Screen Dirt Bag	Best Music
Jennifer Aniston – Horrible Bosses; Bryce Dallas Howard – The Help; Jon Hamm – Bridesmaids; Oliver Cooper – Project X; Colin Farrell – Horrible Bosses	LMFAO — "Party Rock Anthem" (from 21 Jump Street); College with Electric Youth — "A Real Hero" (from Drive); The Chemical Brothers — "The Devil Is in the Details" (from Hanna); Cody Simpson — "I Want Candy" (from Hop); Kid Cudi — "Pursuit of Happiness (Steve Aoki remix)" (from Project X)
Best On-Screen Transformation	Best Gut-Wrenching Performance
Elizabeth Banks – The Hunger Games; Rooney Mara – The Girl With the Dragon Tattoo; Johnny Depp – 21 Jump Street; Michelle Williams – My Week with Marilyn; Colin Farrell – Horrible Bosses	Accidentally Defecates on a Wedding Dress – Kristen Wiig, Maya Rudolph, Rose Byrne, Melissa McCarthy, Wendi McLendon-Covey and Ellie Kemper (from Bridesmaids); Eating a Pie Made of Feces – Bryce Dallas Howard (from The Help); Shoot in the Genitals – Jonah Hill and Rob Riggle (from 21 Jump Street); Skull Stomping – Ryan Gosling (from Drive); Climbing The Burj Khalifa – Tom Cruise (from Mission: Impossible – Ghost Protocol)
Best Kiss	Best Fight
Robert Pattinson and Kristen Stewart – The Twilight Saga: Breaking Dawn – Part 1; Channing Tatum and Rachel McAdams – The Vow; Jennifer Lawrence and Josh Hutcherson – The Hunger Games; Emma Watson and Rupert Grint – Harry Potter and the Deathly Hallows – Part 2; Ryan Gosling and Emma Stone – Crazy, Stupid, Love	Jennifer Lawrence and Josh Hutcherson vs. Alexander Ludwig – The Hunger Games; Daniel Radcliffe vs. Ralph Fiennes – Harry Potter and the Deathly Hallows – Part 2; Tom Cruise vs. Michael Nyqvist – Mission: Impossible – Ghost Protocol; Channing Tatum and Jonah Hill vs. the Kid Gang – 21 Jump Street; Joel Edgerton vs. Tom Hardy – Warrior
Best Cast	Best Hero
Daniel Radcliffe, Rupert Grint, Emma Watson, and Tom Felton – Harry Potter and the Deathly Hallows – Part 2; Kristen Wiig, Maya Rudolph, Rose Byrne, Melissa McCarthy, Wendi McLendon-Covey, and Ellie Kemper – Bridesmaids; Jennifer Lawrence, Josh Hutcherson, Liam Hemsworth, Elizabeth Banks, Woody Harrelson, Lenny Kravitz, and Alexander Ludwig – The Hunger Games; Jonah Hill, Channing Tatum, Ice Cube, Dave Franco, Ellie Kemper, Brie Larson, and Rob Riggle – 21 Jump Street; Emma Stone, Viola Davis, Bryce Dallas Howard, Octavia Spencer, and Jessica Chastain – The Help	Daniel Radcliffe – Harry Potter and the Deathly Hallows – Part 2; Chris Evans – Captain America: The First Avenger; Channing Tatum – 21 Jump Street; Jennifer Lawrence – The Hunger Games; Chris Hemsworth – Thor
Best Latino Actor
Zoe Saldaña – Colombiana; Diego Luna – Casa de Mi Padre; Demián Bichir – A Better Life; Penélope Cruz – Pirates of the Caribbean: On Stranger Tides; Harmony Santana – Gun Hill Road

=== MTV Generation Award ===
- Johnny Depp

=== MTV Trailblazer Award ===
- Emma Stone

== Sneak Peeks ==
- Christian Bale, Gary Oldman, Joseph Gordon-Levitt and Christopher Nolan presented two clips, one of Nolan's The Dark Knight Trilogy, and the second was a sneak peek of the conclusion of the trilogy The Dark Knight Rises.
