= 2015 MTV Movie Awards =

American awards show

- Date: Sunday, April 12, 2015
- Location: Nokia Theatre, Los Angeles, California
- Country: United States
- Hosted by: Amy Schumer

Television/radio coverage
- Network: MTV, MTV2, VH1, and Logo
- Produced by: Den of Thieves
- Directed by: Hamish Hamilton

The 2015 MTV Movie Awards were held on April 12, 2015, at the Nokia Theatre in Los Angeles, California. This was the 24th installment of the award show and the second time the Nokia Theatre would serve as its venue. The award show was hosted by comedian, writer, and actress Amy Schumer. The announcement was made on Wednesday, December 10, 2014.

On February 25, 2015, the announcement for the new MTV Movie Awards logo created by the Australian husband and wife artists duo Dabs Myla. The artists also announced they were working on the set design for the award show. Kelly Osbourne, Josh Horowitz, Christina Garibaldi and British singer Jessie J hosted the pre-show.

== Performers ==
- Fall Out Boy & Fetty Wap - "Centuries"/"Trap Queen"
- Charli XCX, Ty Dolla Sign & Tinashe - "Famous"/"Drop That Kitty"

== Presenters ==
- Vin Diesel - presented Best Female Performance
- Channing Tatum, Joe Manganiello, Matt Bomer, and Adam Rodriguez - Presented Scared-As-Sh**t Performance
- Bella Thorne - presented reminder to vote for Movie of the Year
- Miles Teller - presented the Trailblazer Award
- Mark Wahlberg and Jessie J - presented Best Comedic Performance
- Katy Perry and Taylor Swift - presented Best Shirtless Performance
- Zac Efron and Emily Ratajkowski - introduced Fall Out Boy and Fetty Wap
- Chris Evans, Scarlett Johansson, Chris Hemsworth, Mark Ruffalo, and Jeremy Renner - presented the MTV Generation Award and an exclusive clip of Avengers: Age of Ultron
- Miles Teller, Kate Mara, Michael B. Jordan, and Jamie Bell - presented Best Duo
- Anders Holm and Logan Paul - presented the T-Mobile Award for Best Break Up
- Reese Witherspoon and Sofía Vergara - presented Best Kiss
- Cara Delevingne and Nat Wolff - introduced Charli XCX, Ty Dolla Sign and Tinashe
- Brittany Snow, Anna Camp, Hailee Steinfeld and Rebel Wilson - presented exclusive clip to Pitch Perfect 2 and Best Male Performance
- Jimmy Kimmel - presented the Comedic Genius Award
- Bella Thorne - presented the trailer to Scream
- Dwayne Johnson - presented Movie of the Year

== Nominations ==
=== Films with multiple nominations ===
The following 16 films received multiple nominations:

Nominations	Film
7	The Fault in Our Stars
7	Guardians of the Galaxy
7	Neighbors
5	22 Jump Street
5	Whiplash
4	Gone Girl
4	The Hunger Games: Mockingjay – Part 1
4	The Maze Runner
3	Boyhood
3	Foxcatcher
2	American Sniper
2	Birdman or (The Unexpected Virtue of Ignorance)
2	Captain America: The Winter Soldier
2	The Interview
2	Selma
2	Top Five

=== Individuals with multiple nominations ===
The following 20 acts received multiple nominations:

Nominations	Act
5	Ansel Elgort
5	Chris Pratt
5	Seth Rogen
5	Shailene Woodley
4	Channing Tatum
4	Dylan O'Brien
4	Zac Efron
3	Jennifer Lawrence
3	Jonah Hill
3	Miles Teller
3	Rosamund Pike
3	Rose Byrne
2	Bradley Cooper
2	Chris Evans
2	Ellar Coltrane
2	Emma Stone
2	James Franco
2	Jillian Bell
2	Kevin Hart
2	Scarlett Johansson

== Multiple wins ==
=== Films with multiple wins ===
- Three - Neighbors, The Fault in Our Stars and The Maze Runner
- Two - The Hunger Games: Mockingjay – Part 1

=== Individuals with multiple wins ===
- Three - Dylan O'Brien (The Maze Runner) and Shailene Woodley (The Fault in Our Stars)
- Two - Zac Efron (Neighbors)

== Winners ==
The winners are in bold.

The nominees were announced on the morning of March 4, 2015.

Movie of the Year
**The Fault in Our Stars**; American Sniper; Boyhood; Gone Girl; Guardians of the Galaxy; The Hunger Games: Mockingjay – Part 1; Selma; Whiplash
Best Male Performance	Best Female Performance
**Bradley Cooper – American Sniper**; Ansel Elgort – The Fault in Our Stars; Chris Pratt – Guardians of the Galaxy; Channing Tatum – Foxcatcher; Miles Teller – Whiplash	**Shailene Woodley – The Fault in Our Stars**; Scarlett Johansson – Lucy; Jennifer Lawrence – The Hunger Games: Mockingjay – Part 1; Emma Stone – Birdman or (The Unexpected Virtue of Ignorance); Reese Witherspoon – Wild
Breakthrough Performance	Best Scared-As-S**t Performance
**Dylan O'Brien – The Maze Runner**; Ellar Coltrane – Boyhood; Ansel Elgort – The Fault in Our Stars; David Oyelowo – Selma; Rosamund Pike – Gone Girl	**Jennifer Lopez – The Boy Next Door**; Zach Gilford – The Purge: Anarchy; Dylan O'Brien – The Maze Runner; Rosamund Pike – Gone Girl; Annabelle Wallis – Annabelle
Best On-Screen Duo	Best Shirtless Performance
**Zac Efron & Dave Franco – Neighbors**; Bradley Cooper & Vin Diesel – Guardians of the Galaxy; James Franco & Seth Rogen – The Interview; Channing Tatum & Jonah Hill – 22 Jump Street; Shailene Woodley & Ansel Elgort – The Fault in Our Stars	**Zac Efron – Neighbors**; Ansel Elgort – The Fault in Our Stars; Channing Tatum – Foxcatcher; Chris Pratt – Guardians of the Galaxy; Kate Upton – The Other Woman
Best Fight	Best Kiss
**Dylan O'Brien vs. Will Poulter – The Maze Runner**; Chris Evans vs. Sebastian Stan – Captain America: The Winter Soldier; Jonah Hill vs. Jillian Bell – 22 Jump Street; Edward Norton vs. Michael Keaton – Birdman or (The Unexpected Virtue of Ignorance); Seth Rogen vs. Zac Efron – Neighbors	**Ansel Elgort & Shailene Woodley – The Fault in Our Stars**; Rose Byrne & Halston Sage – Neighbors; James Franco & Seth Rogen – The Interview; Andrew Garfield & Emma Stone – The Amazing Spider-Man 2; Scarlett Johansson & Chris Evans – Captain America: The Winter Soldier
#WTF Moment	Best Villain
**Seth Rogen & Rose Byrne – Neighbors**; Rosario Dawson & Anders Holm – Top Five; Jonah Hill – 22 Jump Street; Jason Sudeikis & Charlie Day – Horrible Bosses 2; Miles Teller – Whiplash	**Meryl Streep – Into the Woods**; Jillian Bell – 22 Jump Street; Peter Dinklage – X-Men: Days of Future Past; Rosamund Pike – Gone Girl; J. K. Simmons – Whiplash
Best Musical Moment	Best Comedic Performance
**Jennifer Lawrence – The Hunger Games: Mockingjay – Part 1**; Bill Hader & Kristen Wiig – The Skeleton Twins; Chris Pratt – Guardians of the Galaxy; Seth Rogen & Zac Efron – Neighbors; Miles Teller – Whiplash	**Channing Tatum – 22 Jump Street**; Rose Byrne – Neighbors; Kevin Hart – The Wedding Ringer; Chris Pratt – Guardians of the Galaxy; Chris Rock – Top Five
Best On-Screen Transformation	Best Hero
**Elizabeth Banks – The Hunger Games: Mockingjay – Part 1**; Steve Carell – Foxcatcher; Ellar Coltrane – Boyhood; Eddie Redmayne – The Theory of Everything; Zoe Saldana – Guardians of the Galaxy	**Dylan O'Brien – The Maze Runner**; Martin Freeman – The Hobbit: The Battle of the Five Armies; Jennifer Lawrence – The Hunger Games: Mockingjay – Part 1; Chris Pratt – Guardians of the Galaxy; Shailene Woodley – The Divergent Series: Insurgent

=== MTV Trailblazer Award ===
- Shailene Woodley

=== Comedic Genius Award ===
- Kevin Hart

=== MTV Generation Award ===
- Robert Downey Jr.
