= 1992 MTV Movie Awards =

American awards show

- Date: Wednesday, June 10, 1992
- Location: Walt Disney Studios, Burbank, California
- Country: United States
- Hosted by: Dennis Miller

Television/radio coverage
- Network: MTV

The 1992 MTV Movie Awards was hosted by Dennis Miller, took place at the Walt Disney Studios in Burbank, California and aired on MTV on Wednesday, June 10, 1992.

== Performers ==
- En Vogue — "My Lovin' (You're Never Gonna Get It)"
- Ugly Kid Joe — "Everything About You"
- Arrested Development — "Tennessee"
- Vince Neil — "You're Invited (But Your Friend Can't Come)"

== Presenters ==
- Kim Basinger — presented Most Desirable Male
- Dennis Miller — introduced En Vogue
- Edward Furlong and Kimberly Williams — presented Best On-Screen Duo
- Daryl Hannah and Damon Wayans — presented Best Comedic Performance
- Rebecca De Mornay — presented Best Action Sequence
- Tia Carrere and Luke Perry — presented Best Kiss
- Dennis Miller — introduced Ugly Kid Joe
- Wesley Snipes — presented Most Desirable Female
- Robert Downey, Jr. — presented Best Male Performance
- Dennis Miller — introduced Arrested Development
- Rosie Perez — presented Best Breakthrough Performance
- Dennis Miller — presented Lifetime Achievement Award
- Ice-T — presented Best Villain
- Dennis Miller — introduced Vince Neil
- Arnold Schwarzenegger — presented Best Female Performance
- Kelly Lynch and Keanu Reeves — presented Best Song from a Movie
- Eddie Murphy — presented Best New Filmmaker
- Demi Moore — presented Best Movie

== Awards ==
Below are the list of nominations. Winners are listed first and highlighted in bold.

=== Best Movie ===
Terminator 2: Judgment Day

- Backdraft
- Boyz n the Hood
- JFK
- Robin Hood: Prince of Thieves

=== Best Male Performance ===
Arnold Schwarzenegger – Terminator 2: Judgment Day

- Kevin Costner – Robin Hood: Prince of Thieves
- Robert De Niro – Cape Fear
- Val Kilmer – The Doors
- Robin Williams - The Fisher King

=== Best Female Performance ===
Linda Hamilton – Terminator 2: Judgment Day

- Geena Davis – Thelma and Louise
- Rebecca De Mornay – The Hand That Rocks the Cradle
- Mary Elizabeth Mastrantonio – Robin Hood: Prince of Thieves
- Julia Roberts – Dying Young

=== Most Desirable Male ===
Keanu Reeves – Point Break

- Kevin Costner – Robin Hood: Prince of Thieves
- Christian Slater – Kuffs
- Patrick Swayze – Point Break
- Jean-Claude Van Damme – Double Impact

=== Most Desirable Female ===
Linda Hamilton – Terminator 2: Judgment Day

- Christina Applegate – Don't Tell Mom the Babysitter's Dead
- Kim Basinger – Final Analysis
- Tia Carrere – Wayne's World
- Julia Roberts – Dying Young

=== Breakthrough Performance ===
Edward Furlong – Terminator 2: Judgment Day

- Anna Chlumsky – My Girl
- Campbell Scott – Dying Young
- Ice-T – New Jack City
- Kimberly Williams – Father of the Bride

=== Best On-Screen Duo ===
Dana Carvey and Mike Myers – Wayne's World

- Anna Chlumsky and Macaulay Culkin – My Girl
- Kevin Costner and Morgan Freeman – Robin Hood: Prince of Thieves
- Geena Davis and Susan Sarandon – Thelma and Louise
- Damon Wayans and Bruce Willis – The Last Boy Scout

=== Best Villain ===
Rebecca De Mornay – The Hand That Rocks the Cradle

- Robert De Niro – Cape Fear
- Robert Patrick – Terminator 2: Judgment Day
- Alan Rickman – Robin Hood: Prince of Thieves
- Wesley Snipes – New Jack City

=== Best Comedic Performance ===
Billy Crystal – City Slickers

- Dana Carvey – Wayne's World
- Steve Martin – Father of the Bride
- Bill Murray – What About Bob?
- Mike Myers – Wayne's World

=== Best Song from a Movie ===
Bryan Adams — "(Everything I Do) I Do It for You" (from Robin Hood: Prince of Thieves)

- MC Hammer — "Addams Groove" (from The Addams Family)
- Color Me Badd — "I Wanna Sex You Up" (from New Jack City)
- Eric Clapton — "Tears in Heaven" (from Rush)
- Guns N' Roses — "You Could Be Mine" (from Terminator 2: Judgment Day)

=== Best Kiss ===
Anna Chlumsky and Macaulay Culkin – My Girl

- Anjelica Huston and Raúl Juliá – The Addams Family
- Annette Bening and Warren Beatty – Bugsy
- Juliette Lewis and Robert De Niro – Cape Fear
- Priscilla Presley and Leslie Nielsen – The Naked Gun 2½: The Smell of Fear

=== Best Action Sequence ===
L.A. Freeway Scene – Terminator 2: Judgment Day

- Burning Building/Escape Through Old Tunnel – Backdraft
- Roof Scene – The Hard Way
- Helicopter Blades Sequence – The Last Boy Scout
- Second Jump from the Plane – Point Break

=== Best New Filmmaker Award ===
- **John Singleton – Boyz n the Hood**

=== Lifetime Achievement Award ===
- **Jason Voorhees – Friday the 13th series**
