= 1993 MTV Movie Awards =

American film awards ceremony

- Date: Tuesday, June 8, 1993
- Location: Walt Disney Studios, Burbank, California
- Country: United States
- Hosted by: Eddie Murphy

Television/radio coverage
- Network: MTV

The 1993 MTV Movie Awards was hosted by Eddie Murphy, took place at the Walt Disney Studios in Burbank, California, and aired on MTV on Tuesday, June 8, 1993.

== Performers ==
- Duran Duran — "Ordinary World"
- Stone Temple Pilots — "Plush"
- Dr. Dre (featuring Snoop Dogg) — "Nuthin' but a 'G' Thang"
- Rod Stewart — "Have I Told You Lately"

== Presenters ==
- Sharon Stone — presented Best Kiss
- Sarah Jessica Parker and Valeria Golino — presented Best On-Screen Duo
- Kelly Lynch and Wesley Snipes — presented Best Villain
- Marisa Tomei and Anthony Kiedis — presented Best Action Sequence
- Rod Stewart and Rachel Hunter — presented Best Song
- Keanu Reeves and LL Cool J — presented Most Desirable Female
- Rosie O'Donnell and Rosie Perez — presented Most Desirable Male
- Mel Gibson — presented Lifetime Achievement Award
- Denzel Washington — presented Best New Filmmaker
- Jon Lovitz — presented Best Comedic Performance
- Mary Stuart Masterson — presented Breakthrough Performance
- Christian Slater — presented Best Female Performance
- Whitney Houston — presented Best Male Performance
- Arnold Schwarzenegger — presented Best Movie

== Awards ==
Below are the list of nominations. Winners are listed first and highlighted in bold.

=== Best Movie ===
A Few Good Men

- Aladdin
- Basic Instinct
- The Bodyguard
- Malcolm X

=== Best Male Performance ===
Denzel Washington – Malcolm X

- Kevin Costner – The Bodyguard
- Tom Cruise – A Few Good Men
- Michael Douglas – Basic Instinct
- Jack Nicholson – A Few Good Men

=== Best Female Performance ===
Sharon Stone – Basic Instinct

- Geena Davis – A League of Their Own
- Whoopi Goldberg – Sister Act
- Whitney Houston – The Bodyguard
- Demi Moore – A Few Good Men

=== Most Desirable Male ===
Christian Slater – Untamed Heart

- Kevin Costner – The Bodyguard
- Tom Cruise – A Few Good Men
- Mel Gibson – Lethal Weapon 3
- Jean-Claude Van Damme – Nowhere to Run

=== Most Desirable Female ===
Sharon Stone – Basic Instinct

- Kim Basinger – Cool World
- Halle Berry – Boomerang
- Madonna – Body of Evidence
- Michelle Pfeiffer – Batman Returns

=== Breakthrough Performance ===
Marisa Tomei – My Cousin Vinny

- Halle Berry – Boomerang
- Whitney Houston – The Bodyguard
- Kathy Najimy – Sister Act
- Rosie O'Donnell – A League of Their Own

=== Best On-Screen Duo ===
Mel Gibson and Danny Glover – Lethal Weapon 3

- Sharon Stone and Michael Douglas – Basic Instinct
- Whitney Houston and Kevin Costner – The Bodyguard
- Tom Cruise and Nicole Kidman - Far and Away
- Woody Harrelson and Wesley Snipes – White Men Can't Jump

=== Best Villain ===
Jennifer Jason Leigh – Single White Female

- Danny DeVito – Batman Returns
- Ray Liotta – Unlawful Entry
- Jack Nicholson – A Few Good Men
- Sharon Stone – Basic Instinct

=== Best Comedic Performance ===
Robin Williams – Aladdin

- Whoopi Goldberg – Sister Act
- Eddie Murphy – Boomerang
- Bill Murray – Groundhog Day
- Joe Pesci – My Cousin Vinny

=== Best Song from a Movie ===
Whitney Houston — "I Will Always Love You" (from The Bodyguard)

- Boyz II Men — "End of the Road" (from Boomerang)
- Sting and Eric Clapton — "It's Probably Me" (from Lethal Weapon 3)
- Peabo Bryson and Regina Belle — "A Whole New World" (from Aladdin)
- Alice in Chains — "Would?" (from Singles)

=== Best Kiss ===
Christian Slater and Marisa Tomei – Untamed Heart

- Pauline Brailsford and Tom Hanks – A League of Their Own
- Michelle Pfeiffer and Michael Keaton – Batman Returns
- Winona Ryder and Gary Oldman – Bram Stoker's Dracula
- Mel Gibson and Rene Russo – Lethal Weapon 3
- Woody Harrelson and Rosie Perez – White Men Can't Jump

=== Best Action Sequence ===
Mel Gibson's Motorcycle Crash – Lethal Weapon 3

- Aliens Chase Through Tunnel – Alien 3
- Plane Crash – Alive: The Miracle of the Andes
- Oklahoma Land Race – Far and Away
- Helicopter Explosion – Under Siege

=== Best New Filmmaker ===
- **Carl Franklin – One False Move**

=== Lifetime Achievement Award ===
- **The Three Stooges**
