= Jill Messick =

American film producer (1967–2018)

- Messick in 2007
- Born: Jill Laura Sobel; July 27, 1967; Los Angeles, California, U.S.
- Died: February 7, 2018 (aged 50); Los Angeles, California, U.S.
- Cause of death: Suicide
- Occupation: Film producer
- Spouse: Kevin Messick (m. 1997; div. 2015)
- Partner: Dan Schuck (2013–2018; her death)
- Children: 2
- Family: James H. Nicholson (grandfather)

Jill Laura Sobel Messick (née Sobel; July 27, 1967 – February 7, 2018) was an American film producer. She worked as an executive producer and producer on several films, including She's All That (1999), Frida (2002), Mean Girls (2004), Hot Rod (2007), Baby Mama (2008), and A Minecraft Movie (2025).

She was actress Rose McGowan's manager in 1997 when McGowan alleged that she was raped by producer Harvey Weinstein. After the Weinstein allegations became public in late 2017, McGowan was highly critical of Messick, and Weinstein's lawyer released a private email sent by Messick that contradicted McGowan's claims. The publicity surrounding the scandal led to online cyberbullying directed at her. Messick died by suicide in February 2018. In a public statement, Messick's family said that she supported the MeToo movement and called her loss collateral damage of a "feeding frenzy", blaming Weinstein, McGowan, the media, and the public for her death.

== Early life ==
Messick was the daughter of Michael Sobel and actress Laura Nicholson Sobel (1945–2015). Her maternal grandfather was film producer James H. Nicholson and she had a brother named Jan. After attending Santa Barbara High School, where she was named homecoming princess, Messick graduated with a degree in communications from the University of Southern California.

== Career ==
She began her career at the Gersh Agency and later worked as a junior manager at Somers/Teitelbaum/David. She was director of development at Woods Entertainment from 1994 to 1996, working on films including Scream (1996) and Teaching Mrs. Tingle (1999), both distributed by Dimension Films, a division of Miramax Films. She also helped facilitate Miramax distributing M. Night Shyamalan's Wide Awake (1998). Shyamalan later said that "she helped fight for my second film to get made at Miramax. Really made me feel I had a big sister protecting me." In the late 1990s, she worked as a talent manager at Addis-Wechsler & Associates, where her clients included Chloë Sevigny and John Bloom. In November 1997, she was hired as vice-president of development by Miramax Films and tasked with "scouting writers and directors and bringing in material to the company." She reported directly to executive vice-president of production Meryl Poster and was hired by Cathy Konrad, who said that she had "a keen eye for spotting new talent."

At Miramax Messick helped bring She's All That (1999) to the company within a month of her hiring, It eventually grossed $60 million. She worked on such films as Boys and Girls (2000), Frida (2002) and early development of Cinderella Man (2005). She also worked directly with Dimension Films and helped make multipicture deals with screenwriters R. Lee Fleming, Jr., Andrew Lowery and Andrew Miller. In 2000, she was promoted to senior Vice-President of Production. She worked at Miramax until 2003. She later worked as an executive producer for Lorne Michaels, Paramount Pictures and The Weinstein Company. Her film credits included Get Over It (2001), Mean Girls (2004), Hot Rod (2007), Baby Mama (2008), Masterminds (2016), and A Minecraft Movie (2025), the latter of which was released seven years after her death.

Messick made a brief foray into television production with the short-lived NBC sitcom Bad Judge (2014–15). She was married to producer Kevin Messick, with whom she had two children. They separated in 2013 and divorced in 2015. After their separation, Messick was in a relationship with author Dan Schuck for five years until her death.

== Weinstein allegations ==
Messick was actress Rose McGowan's talent manager in 1997 at the time when McGowan alleges Harvey Weinstein raped her. In an October 2017 interview with The New York Times, McGowan was highly critical of Messick's lack of support after the incident and the article suggests that Messick's job at Miramax was directly related to the aftermath. On January 30, 2018, Weinstein's attorney released a private email from Messick to Weinstein as a way to defend Weinstein. The email was sent months before the incident became publicly known and Messick's account of the incident was that McGowan told her that she consensually got into a hot tub with Weinstein and later regretted it. Messick's family later said that McGowan "never once used the word rape" when she told Messick about the incident.

McGowan's memoir Brave, also released on January 30, 2018, details the alleged assault and is highly critical of Messick. In a documentary series about McGowan on the E! network, titled Citizen Rose, produced by Bunim/Murray Productions and also airing on January 30, McGowan accused Messick of betrayal and of siding with Weinstein in exchange for her job at Miramax. After Weinstein's lawyers released Messick's email, McGowan claimed that Messick's statements had already been disproven by her former assistant Anne Woodward in The New York Times article.

The media and public attention had a negative impact on Messick. According to Mandy Stadtmiller in The Daily Beast, the publicity led to online cyberbullying after "activists on Twitter named, shamed and identified how Messick could be reached, with one even revealing Messick’s purposefully obscured LinkedIn profile (she did not use her full name) and encouraging others to reach out to her and let her know what they really thought of her."

A Messick family statement stated that she had suffered from bipolar disorder and that a "manic episode" in 2013 had affected her career. The statement also said: "Seeing her name in headlines again and again, as part of one person's attempt to gain more attention for her personal cause, along with Harvey's desperate attempt to vindicate himself, was devastating for her. It broke Jill."

== Death ==
Messick died by suicide in Los Angeles on February 7, 2018, one day after the third anniversary of her mother's death. The manner of her suicide was not announced.

After that, Messick's family issued a public statement that was critical of the media, Weinstein, and McGowan, as well as "our new culture of unlimited information sharing and a willingness to accept statement as fact. The speed of disseminating information has carried mistruths about Jill as a person, which she was unable and unwilling to challenge. She became collateral damage in an already horrific story." Her family defended Messick's decision to not publicly address McGowan's negative statements about her because of "fear of undermining the many individuals who came forward in truth. She opted not to add to the feeding frenzy, allowing her name and her reputation to be sullied despite having done nothing wrong." It also asserts that, contrary to McGowan's accusations, Messick (who supported the MeToo movement) "was the first person who stood up on Rose's behalf, and alerted her bosses to the horrific experience which Rose suffered" despite being a junior-level employee at that time.

McGowan paid tribute to Messick on Instagram without addressing her family's accusations. Messick was among the deceased memorialized at the 90th Academy Awards.

== Filmography ==
- 1999 – She's All That (co-executive producer)
- 2000 – Boys and Girls (executive producer)
- 2001 – Get Over It (executive producer)
- 2002 – Frida (executive producer)
- 2004 – Mean Girls (executive producer)
- 2007 – Hot Rod (executive producer)
- 2008 – Baby Mama (executive producer)
- 2014–2015 – Bad Judge, TV series (executive producer)
- 2016 – Masterminds (executive producer)
- 2025 – A Minecraft Movie (producer, posthumous credit and dedicated in memory)
