= Queen bee (sociology) =

Leader of a female group

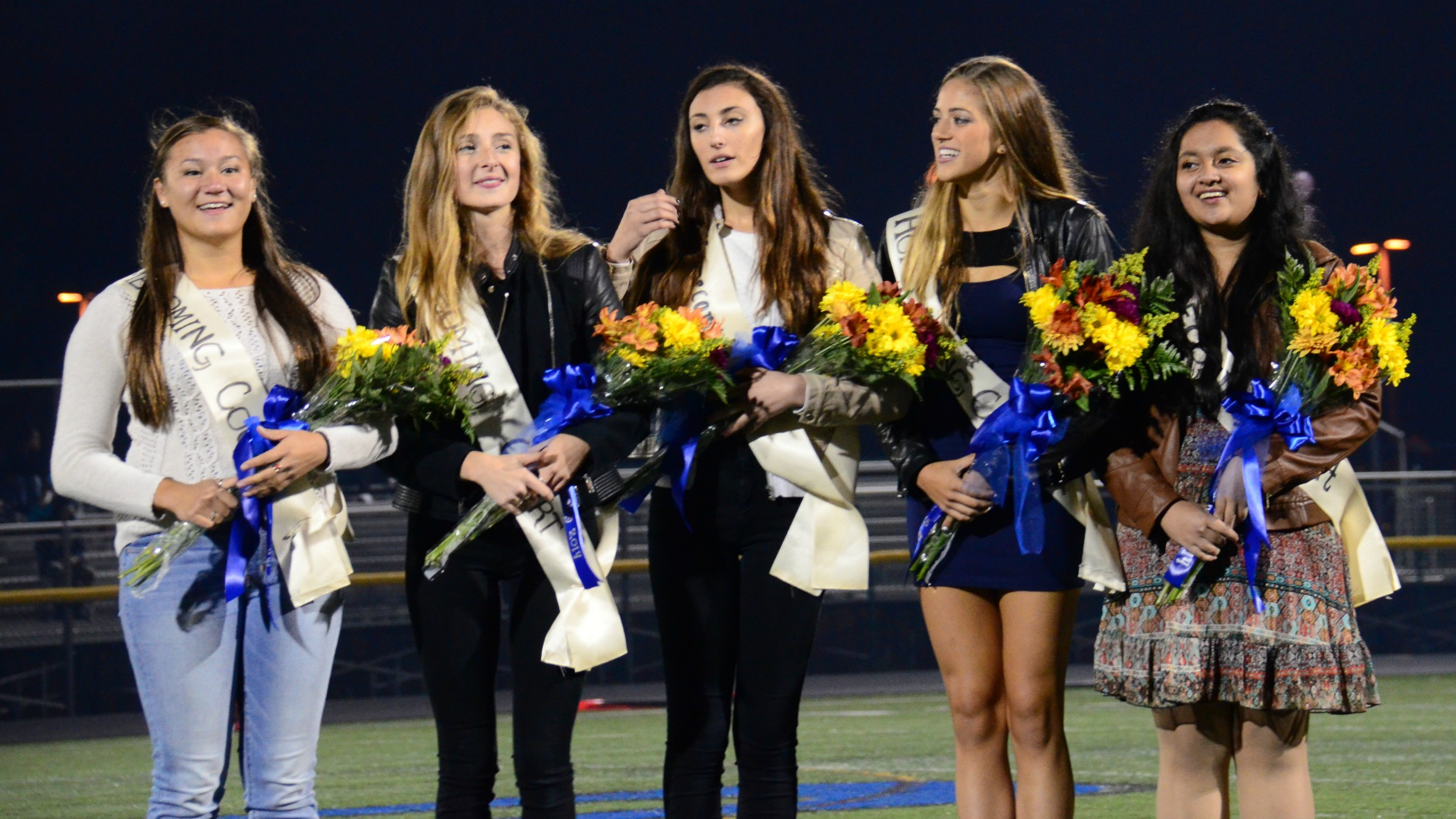
Homecoming Queen finalists in 2014 appear before the audience. In some American high schools and universities, the "queen" is an elected senior leadership role for students in their final year of study.

A queen bee is a woman who dominates or leads a group, is in a favoured position or behaves as such. The term has been applied in several social settings, including business and education. It has also become a stock character or the basis of fictional characters in novels, film, television and other media, particularly in the North American context.

== Businesses ==
In a business environment, "queen bee" may refer to a woman in upper management who advanced in the ranks without any help of any type of affirmative action programs. They often see other, usually younger, women as competitors and will refuse to help them advance within a company, preferring to mentor a male over a female employee. Some such "queen bees" may actively take steps to hinder another woman's advancement as they are seen as direct competitors. Such tactics are sometimes referred to as heterophily (in the sense of positive preference and favoritism for opposite-sex colleagues) or the queen bee syndrome.

The term loophole woman, coined by Caroline Bird in her book Born Female: The High Cost of Keeping Women Down (1968), has a similar meaning. Marie Mullaney defines the loophole woman as one who, "successful in a male-dominated field such as law, business administration, or medicine, is opposed to other women's attaining similar levels of professional success. Such professional success, if attained by women on a large scale, would detract from, if not substantially reduce, her own status and importance."

== Schools ==
A queen bee in a school setting is sometimes referred to as a school diva or school (or class) princess. They are often stereotyped in the media as being beautiful, charismatic, manipulative, popular, and wealthy, often holding positions of high social status, such as being head cheerleader (or being the captain of some other, usually an all-girl, sports team), the Homecoming or Prom Queen (or both). The phenomenon of queen bees is common in finishing schools.

Queen bees may wield substantial influence, popularity, and power over their cliques and are considered role models by clique members and outsiders. Her actions are closely followed and imitated. Sussana Stern identifies the following qualities as characteristic of queen bees:

- Possessing an inflated ego, an exaggerated sense of self-aggrandizement, and an overly-heightened sense of self-esteem, which may lead to arrogance and snobbery.
- Being overly-aggressive, selfish, manipulative, shallow, superficial, and hubristic
- Behaving as a bully or sociopath
- Being wealthy and/or spoiled
- Being tall, fashionable, sexy, pretty, popular, talented, privileged, or even of superior intelligence
- Being envied/feared/admired by peers (mainly female peers), who often express internalized sentiments of inadequacy, inferiority, and insecurity.

== Fictional examples ==
Films

- Kathryn Merteuil from the 1999 film Cruel Intentions played by Sarah Michelle Gellar; a wealthy, cold-hearted and cocaine-using manipulator from the elite Upper East Side of New York. Kathryn hides her true malevolent nature beneath a wholesome facade of Catholicism, propriety and compassion, fooling her peers and teachers into believing she is a model student and an image of perfection when she is really an expert in deceit and cruelty, and uses and humiliates others for her own pleasure.
- Regina George in the 2004 film Mean Girls, played by Rachel McAdams. The wealthy, beautiful, and popular queen bee of Northshore High school, who rules over the Plastics, an exclusive clique of wealthy and beautiful girls.
- Courtney Shayne in the 1999 film Jawbreaker, played by Rose McGowan. The sociopathic Courtney murders her rival, Elizabeth Purr (Charlotte Ayanna) at the beginning of the film, and goes to extreme lengths to cover up the murder and maintain her popularity by tarnishing the reputation of her victim, by spreading lies that Elizabeth was a rebellious, promiscuous girl who was murdered by a one-night stand.
- Emma Woodhouse, the titular protagonist from Jane Austen's novel Emma and its film and television adaptations could be considered to be an early example of the "queen bee" stereotype. Emma is the beautiful and intelligent daughter of a wealthy landed gentry family, and is genuinely well-liked and popular amongst the people of the village of Highbury, where she lives. Although she is kind and genuinely well-meaning, Emma has a tendency to be selfish and meddlesome, constantly interfering in the lives of those around her, especially their romantic relationships, believing her judgement to be infallible. Gradually throughout the novel, she is considerably humbled, and she accepts that she must improve her attitude and become less self-centred and interfering. Her rival, Mrs Augusta Elton, the village vicar's wife, follows the queen bee character more closely, being vain and obnoxious, and constantly competes with Emma for status in the community.

TV series

- Rachel Green, from the sitcom Friends, played by Jennifer Aniston. Throughout the series, Rachel was constantly described as the most popular girl in Lincoln High School, being the head cheerleader, Prom Queen and class president. However, despite her close friendship with the then-overweight, awkward Monica Geller (Courteney Cox), Rachel was also revealed to be somewhat spiteful towards some of her less popular classmates and even toward Monica's older brother, Ross Geller (David Schwimmer).
- Alison DiLaurentis, played by Sasha Pieterse, one of the main characters of Pretty Little Liars, was the 'it girl' and the 'queen bee' of Rosewood. Her tight-knit group consisted of her closest friends. Alison was described as beautiful, manipulative, reserved, and vengeful. She could make people feel special, which made them dependent on her because they wanted to continue feeling that way.
  - Hanna Marin, played by Ashley Benson, is one of the main characters of Pretty Little Liars. She became the new 'queen bee' of Rosewood after Alison DiLaurentis disappeared, transforming from the insecure 'Hefty Hanna' into the popular and glamorous girl at school.
- Blair Waldorf is a main character in the Gossip Girl is portrayed by Leighton Meester. She was the ultimate queen bee of Constance Billard, her reign marked by tiaras, intrigues, and a sense of style that no one could match. Blair not only ruled the school hallways, she also set the social rules of the Upper East Side.
  - Jenny Humphrey, played by Taylor Momsen in Gossip Girl, managed to climb the ranks until she became the new queen bee of the school, inheriting Blair Waldorf's 'crown.' Jenny set rules, controlled rumors, and surrounded herself with followers, but her style was more aggressive and daring. Her reign was short-lived and ended in scandals, betrayals, and decisions that pushed her away from the Upper East Side.
- Cheryl Blossom, portrayed by Madelaine Petsch in Riverdale, she is the modern archetype of the Queen Bee: powerful, glamorous, and feared in the halls of Riverdale High. She was the captain of the River Vixens, the cheerleading team, from where she exercised her authority like a queen bee. Sarcastic, manipulative, and quick-witted, but also vulnerable and shaped by family traumas.

== See also ==
- Elitism
- Mean girl
- Narcissism
- Sociopathy
- Queen bee syndrome
- Prima donna
- Diva
