= MTV Movie Award for Best Villain =

Honor awarded to primarily American actors

This is a following list of the MTV Movie Award winners and nominees for Best Villain. In 2012, the award was renamed Best On-Screen Dirt Bag, though the Best Villain moniker was reinstated the following year. Two of the winners (Denzel Washington and Heath Ledger) also won Academy Awards for their performances. In 1999, Best Villain had a tie for Matt Dillon and Stephen Dorff. Aaliyah and Heath Ledger in 2002 and 2009 respectively were both posthumously nominated (Ledger posthumously won too). Daniel Radcliffe is the first recipient to win both this and Best Hero. Dwayne Johnson, Ewan McGregor and Tom Cruise have each received nominations in both categories, but never won in either. In 2017, when the award became the MTV Movie & TV Award for Best Villain, Jeffrey Dean Morgan was the first TV recipient to win.

== Winners and nominees ==
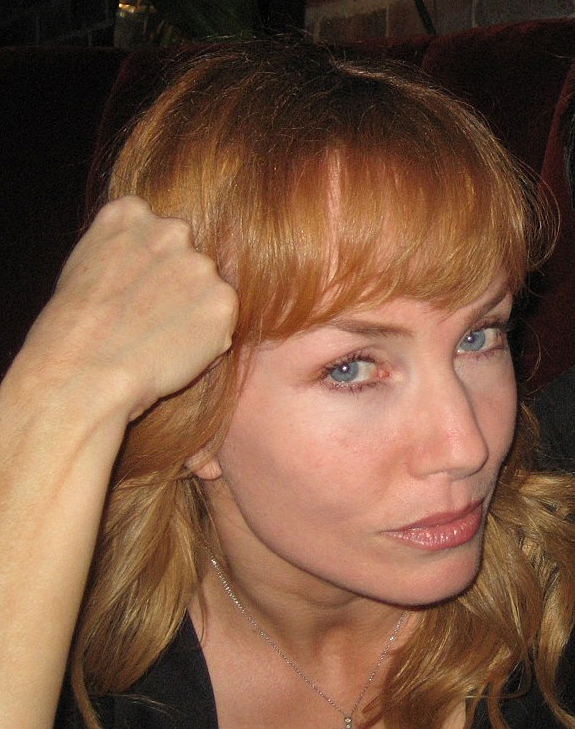
First winner of this award category Rebecca De Mornay for her performance in The Hand That Rocks the Cradle, 1992

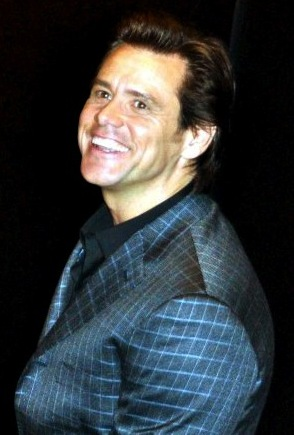
2-time winner Jim Carrey in 1997 and 2001 on The Cable Guy and How The Grinch Stole Christmas

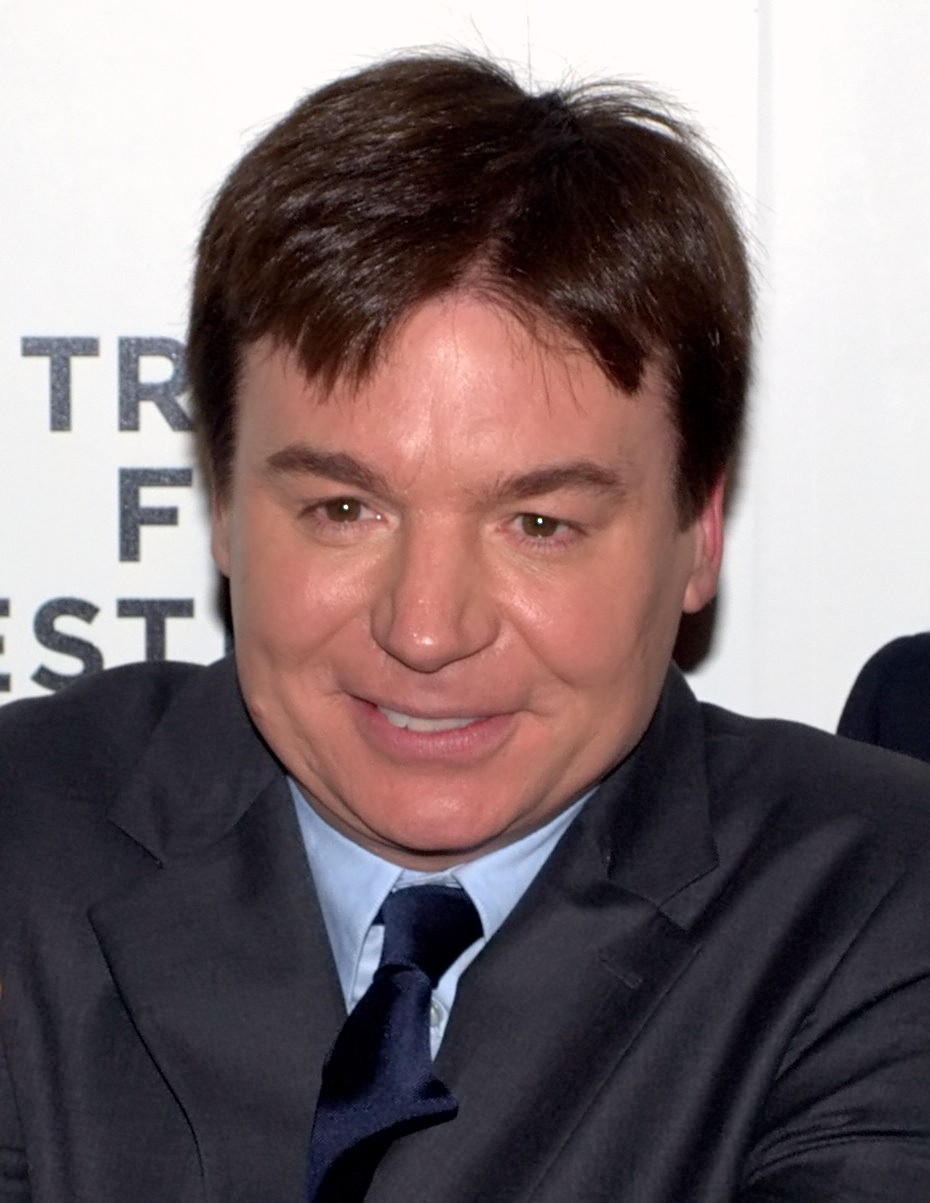
2-time winner Mike Myers in 1998 and 2000 on 2 out of 3 of Austin Powers film series

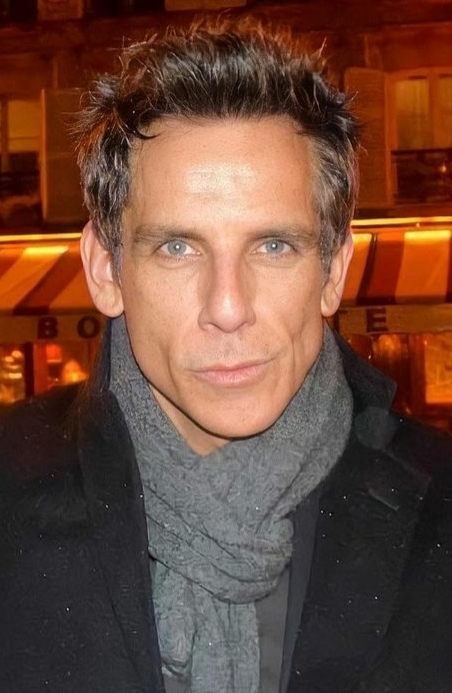
2005 winner Ben Stiller on his strong-aggressive villain performance in Dodgeball: A True Underdog Story

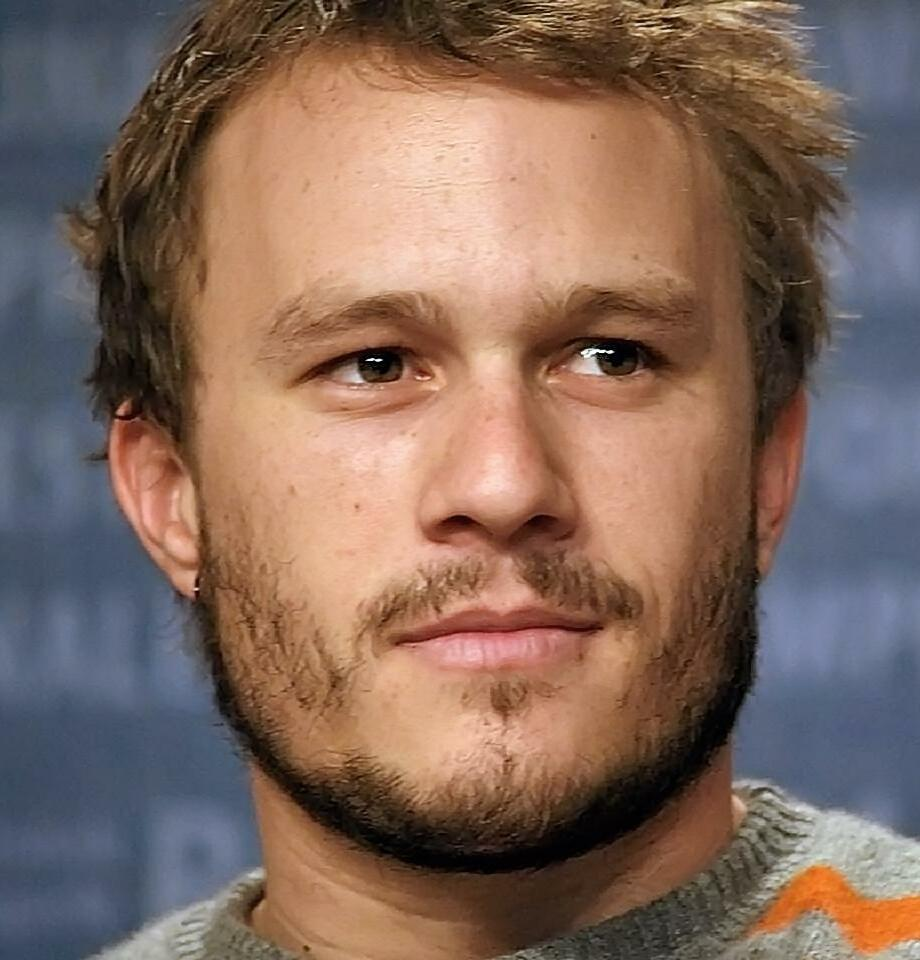
2009 winner Heath Ledger on his strong performance as Joker in The Dark Knight, the win was announced one year after his death

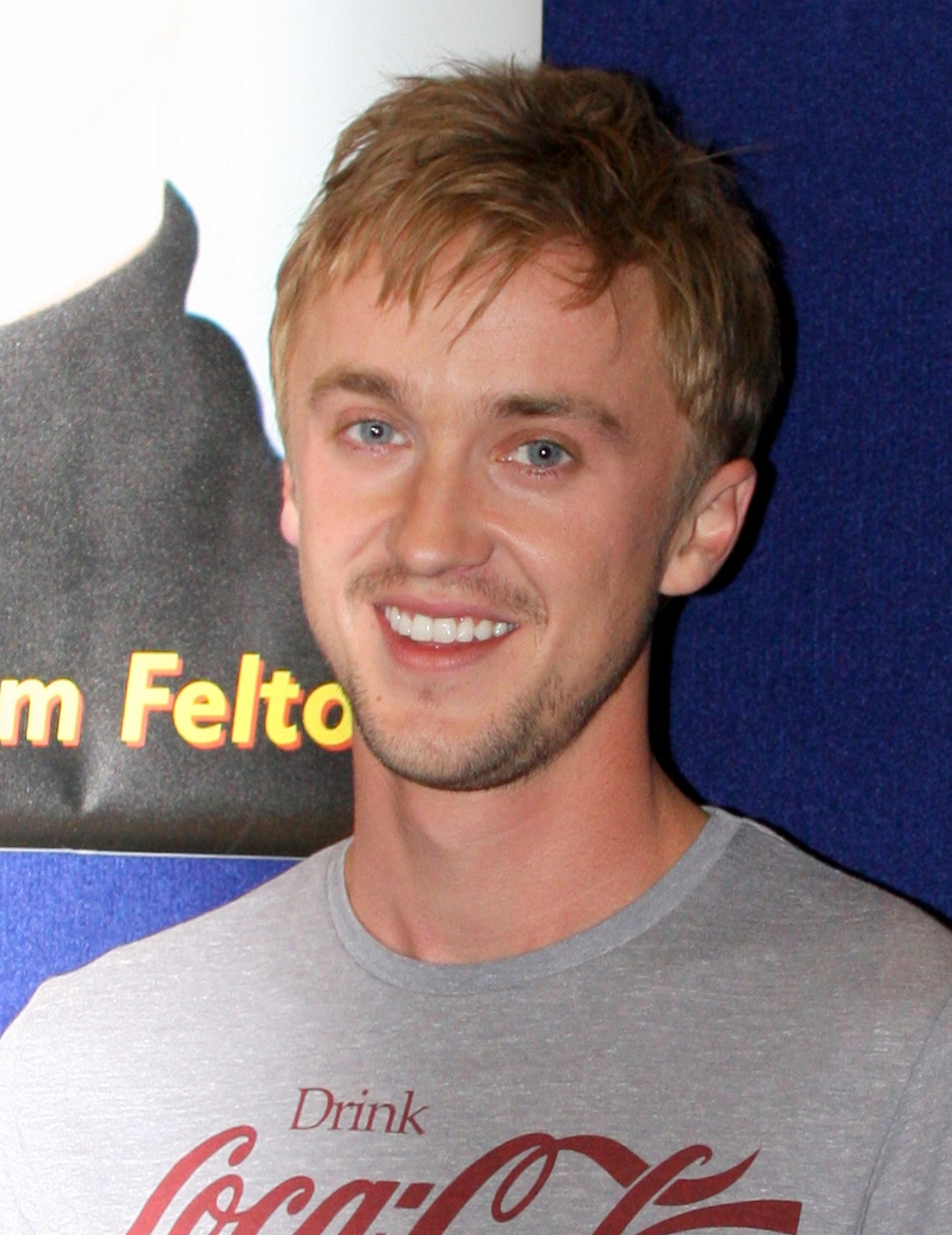
2-time winner Tom Felton in 2010 and 2011 on his performance as Draco Malfoy in 2 out of 8 Harry Potter film series

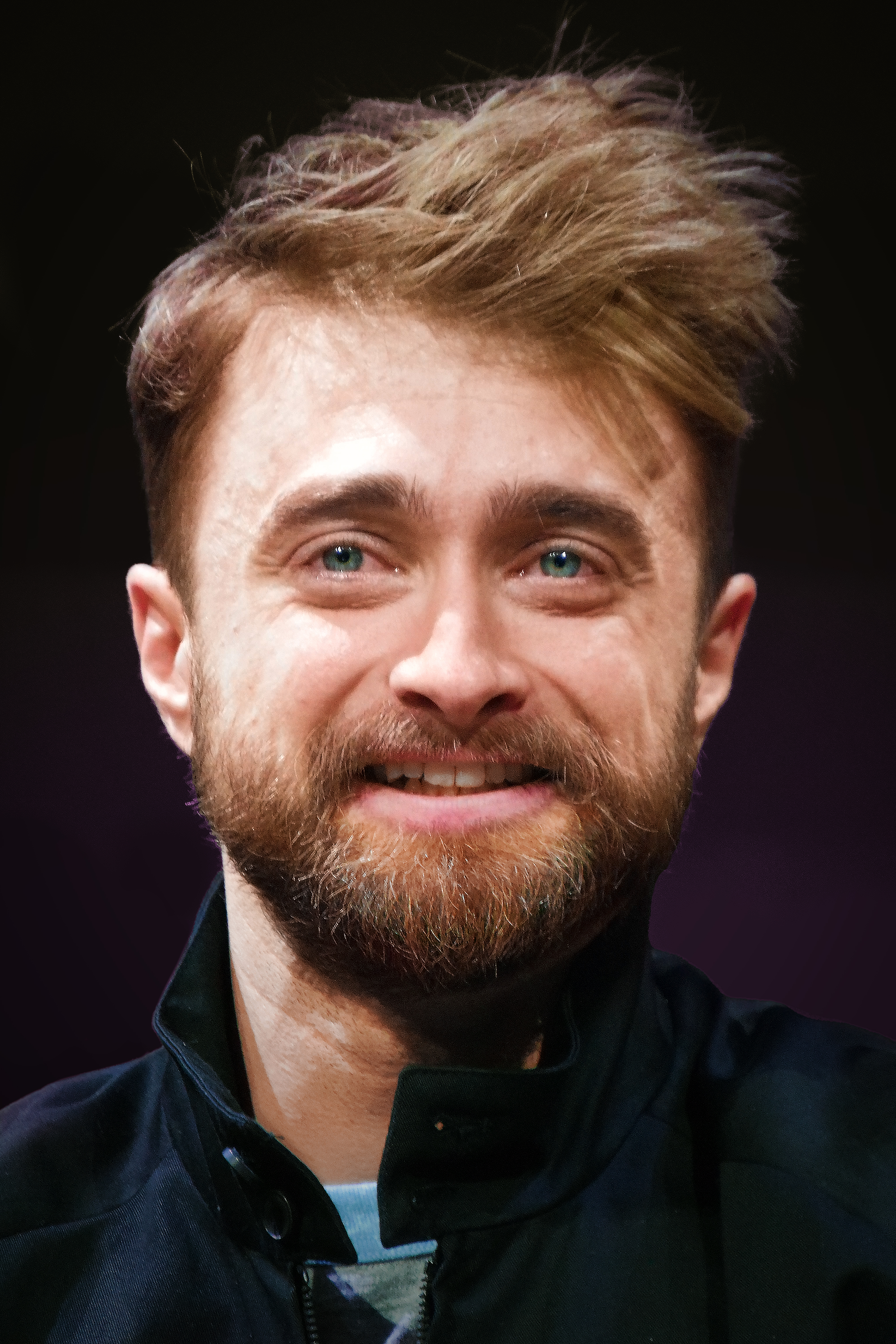
2022 winner Daniel Radcliffe on his strong-aggressive villain performance in The Lost City

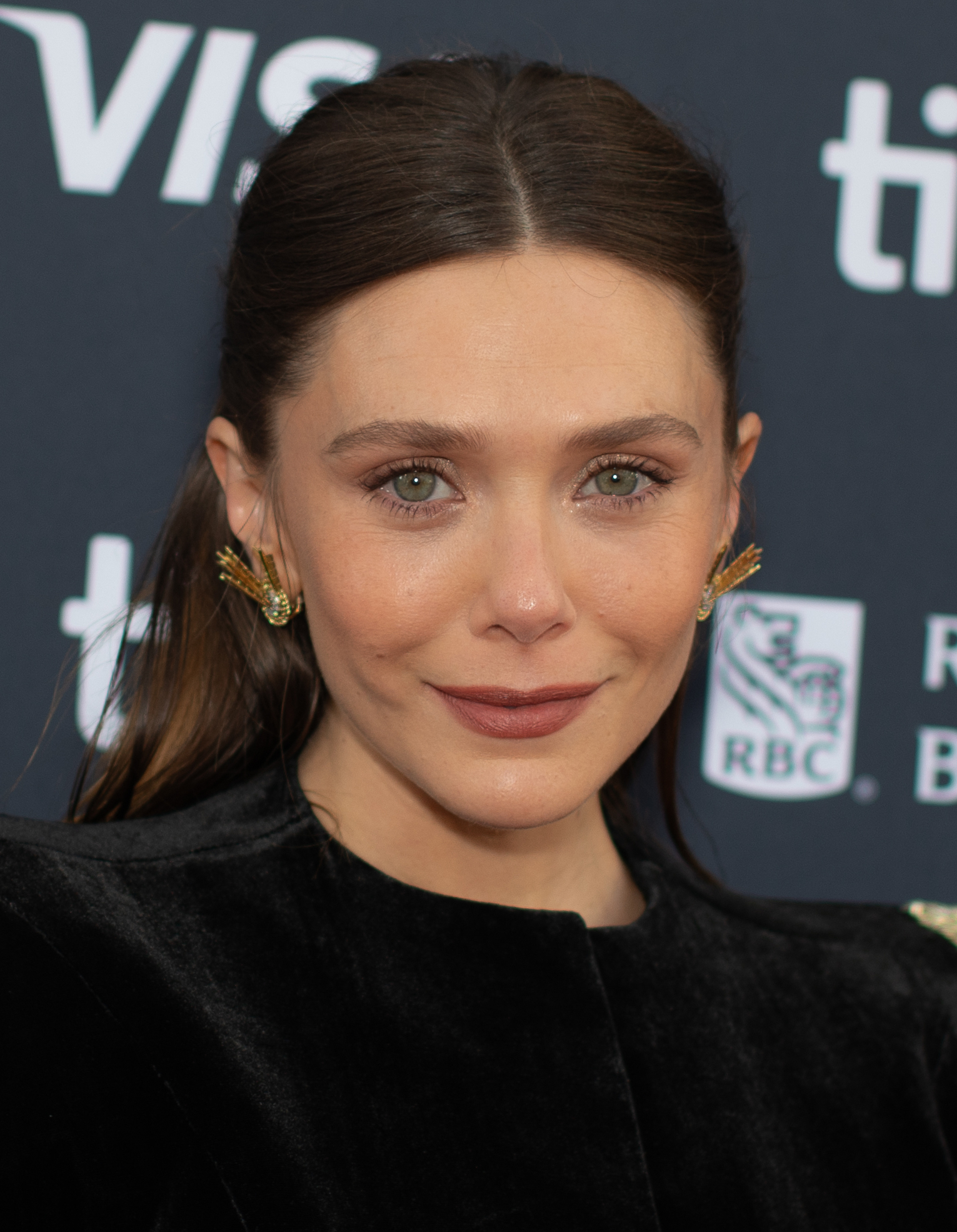
Most recent winner in 2023 Elizabeth Olsen on her performance as Wanda Maximoff / Scarlet Witch in Doctor Strange in the Multiverse of Madness

Year	Actor	Film	Role(s)	Ref.
1992	Rebecca De Mornay	The Hand That Rocks the Cradle	Mrs. Mott / Peyton Flanders	
1992	Robert De Niro	Cape Fear	Max Cady	
1992	Robert Patrick	Terminator 2: Judgment Day	T-1000	
1992	Alan Rickman	Robin Hood: Prince of Thieves	Sheriff of Nottingham	
1992	Wesley Snipes	New Jack City	Nino Brown	
1993	Jennifer Jason Leigh	Single White Female	Ellen Besch / Hedra "Hedy" Carlson	
1993	Danny DeVito	Batman Returns	Oswald Cobblepot / The Penguin	
1993	Ray Liotta	Unlawful Entry	Officer Pete Davis	
1993	Jack Nicholson	A Few Good Men	Colonel Nathan R. Jessup	
1993	Sharon Stone	Basic Instinct	Catherine Tramell	
1994	Alicia Silverstone	The Crush	Adrian Forrester	
1994	Macaulay Culkin	The Good Son	Henry Evans	
1994	John Malkovich	In the Line of Fire	Mitch Leary	
1994	Wesley Snipes	Demolition Man	Simon Phoenix	
1994	—N/a	Jurassic Park	T. Rex	
1995	Dennis Hopper	Speed	Howard Payne	
1995	Tom Cruise	Interview with the Vampire	Lestat de Lioncourt	
1995	Jeremy Irons	The Lion King	Scar (voice)	
1995	Tommy Lee Jones	Blown Away	Ryan Gaerity	
1995	Demi Moore	Disclosure	Meredith Johnson	
1996	Kevin Spacey	Seven	John Doe	
1996	Jim Carrey	Batman Forever	Dr. Edward Nygma / The Riddler	
1996	Tommy Lee Jones	Batman Forever	Harvey Dent / Harvey Two-Face	
1996	Joe Pesci	Casino	Nicky Santoro	
1996	John Travolta	Broken Arrow	USAF Major Vick "Deak" Deakins	
1997	Jim Carrey	The Cable Guy	Ernie "Chip" Douglas / The Cable Guy	
1997	Robert De Niro	The Fan	Gil Renard	
1997	Edward Norton	Primal Fear	Roy / Aaron Stampler	
1997	Kiefer Sutherland	A Time to Kill	Freddie Lee Cobb	
1997	Mark Wahlberg	Fear	David McCall	
1998	Mike Myers	Austin Powers: International Man of Mystery	Dr. Evil	
1998	Nicolas Cage and John Travolta	Face/Off	Castor Troy	
1998	Gary Oldman	Air Force One	Egor Korshunov	
1998	Al Pacino	The Devil's Advocate	John Milton	
1998	Billy Zane	Titanic	Cal Hockley	
1999 (tie)	Matt Dillon	There's Something About Mary	Pat Healy	
1999 (tie)	Stephen Dorff	Blade	Deacon Frost	
1999 (tie)	Brad Dourif	Bride of Chucky	Chucky	
1999 (tie)	Jet Li	Lethal Weapon 4	Wah Sing Ku	
1999 (tie)	Rose McGowan	Jawbreaker	Courtney Shayne	
2000	Mike Myers	Austin Powers: The Spy Who Shagged Me	Dr. Evil	
2000	Matt Damon	The Talented Mr. Ripley	Tom Ripley	
2000	Sarah Michelle Gellar	Cruel Intentions	Kathryn Merteuil	
2000	Ray Park	Star Wars: Episode I – The Phantom Menace	Darth Maul	
2000	Christopher Walken	Sleepy Hollow	The Headless Horseman	
2001	Jim Carrey	How the Grinch Stole Christmas	The Grinch	
2001	Kevin Bacon	Hollow Man	Dr. Sebastian Caine	
2001	Vincent D'Onofrio	The Cell	Carl Rudolph Stargher	
2001	Anthony Hopkins	Hannibal	Dr. Hannibal Lecter	
2001	Joaquin Phoenix	Gladiator	Commodus	
2002	Denzel Washington	Training Day	Detective Alonzo Harris	
2002	Aaliyah	Queen of the Damned	Queen Akasha	
2002	Christopher Lee	The Lord of the Rings: The Fellowship of the Ring	Saruman the White	
2002	Tim Roth	Planet of the Apes	General Thade	
2002	Zhang Ziyi	Rush Hour 2	Hu Li	
2003	Daveigh Chase	The Ring	Samara Morgan	
2003	Willem Dafoe	Spider-Man	Norman Osborn / Green Goblin	
2003	Daniel Day-Lewis	Gangs of New York	William "Bill the Butcher" Cutting	
2003	Colin Farrell	Daredevil	Bullseye	
2003	Mike Myers	Austin Powers in Goldmember	Dr. Evil / Goldmember	
2004	Lucy Liu	Kill Bill: Volume 1	O-Ren Ishii	
2004	Andrew Bryniarski	The Texas Chainsaw Massacre	Thomas Hewitt / Leatherface	
2004	Demi Moore	Charlie's Angels: Full Throttle	Madison Lee	
2004	Geoffrey Rush	Pirates of the Caribbean: The Curse of the Black Pearl	Captain Hector Barbossa	
2004	Kiefer Sutherland	Phone Booth	The Caller	
2005	Ben Stiller	DodgeBall: A True Underdog Story	White Goodman	
2005	Jim Carrey	Lemony Snicket's A Series of Unfortunate Events	Count Olaf	
2005	Tom Cruise	Collateral	Vincent	
2005	Rachel McAdams	Mean Girls	Regina George	
2005	Alfred Molina	Spider-Man 2	Dr. Otto Octavius / Doctor Octopus	
2006	Hayden Christensen	Star Wars: Episode III – Revenge of the Sith	Anakin Skywalker / Darth Vader	
2006	Tobin Bell	Saw II	John Kramer / Jigsaw	
2006	Ralph Fiennes	Harry Potter and the Goblet of Fire	Lord Voldemort	
2006	Cillian Murphy	Batman Begins	Dr. Jonathan Crane / Scarecrow	
2006	Tilda Swinton	The Chronicles of Narnia: The Lion, the Witch and the Wardrobe	Jadis the White Witch	
2007	Jack Nicholson	The Departed	Francis "Frank" Costello	
2007	Tobin Bell	Saw III	John Kramer / Jigsaw	
2007	Bill Nighy	Pirates of the Caribbean: Dead Man's Chest	Davy Jones	
2007	Rodrigo Santoro	300	King Xerxes	
2007	Meryl Streep	The Devil Wears Prada	Miranda Priestly	
2008	Johnny Depp	Sweeney Todd: The Demon Barber of Fleet Street	Benjamin Barker / Sweeney Todd	
2008	Javier Bardem	No Country for Old Men	Anton Chigurh	
2008	Topher Grace	Spider-Man 3	Eddie Brock / Venom	
2008	Angelina Jolie	Beowulf	Grendel's Mother	
2008	Denzel Washington	American Gangster	Frank Lucas	
2009	Heath Ledger	The Dark Knight	The Joker	
2009	Luke Goss	Hellboy II: The Golden Army	Prince Nuada Silverlance	
2009	Dwayne Johnson	Get Smart	Agent 23	
2009	Derek Mears	Friday the 13th	Jason Voorhees	
2009	Johnathon Schaech	Prom Night	Richard Fenton	
2010	Tom Felton	Harry Potter and the Half-Blood Prince	Draco Malfoy	
2010	Helena Bonham Carter	Alice in Wonderland	Iracebeth of Crims / Red Queen	
2010	Ken Jeong	The Hangover	Leslie Chow	
2010	Stephen Lang	Avatar	Colonel Miles Quaritch	
2010	Christoph Waltz	Inglourious Basterds	Colonel Hans Landa	
2011	Tom Felton	Harry Potter and the Deathly Hallows – Part 1	Draco Malfoy	
2011	Ned Beatty	Toy Story 3	Lots-O'-Huggin' Bear (voice)	
2011	Leighton Meester	The Roommate	Rebecca Evans	
2011	Mickey Rourke	Iron Man 2	Ivan Vanko / Whiplash	
2011	Christoph Waltz	The Green Hornet	Benjamin Chudnofsky / Bloodnofsky	
2012	Jennifer Aniston	Horrible Bosses	Dr. Julia Harris	
2012	Oliver Cooper	Project X	Costa	
2012	Colin Farrell	Horrible Bosses	Bobby Pellitt	
2012	Jon Hamm	Bridesmaids	Ted	
2012	Bryce Dallas Howard	The Help	Hilly Holbrook	
2013	Tom Hiddleston	The Avengers	Loki	
2013	Javier Bardem	Skyfall	Tiago Rodriguez / Raoul Silva	
2013	Marion Cotillard	The Dark Knight Rises	Miranda Tate / Talia al Ghul	
2013	Leonardo DiCaprio	Django Unchained	Calvin J. Candie	
2013	Tom Hardy	The Dark Knight Rises	Bane	
2014	Mila Kunis	Oz the Great and Powerful	Theodora	
2014	Barkhad Abdi	Captain Phillips	Abduwali Muse	
2014	Benedict Cumberbatch	Star Trek Into Darkness	Khan Noonien Singh	
2014	Michael Fassbender	12 Years a Slave	Edwin Epps	
2014	Donald Sutherland	The Hunger Games: Catching Fire	President Coriolanus Snow	
2015	Meryl Streep	Into the Woods	The Witch	
2015	Jillian Bell	22 Jump Street	Mercedes	
2015	Peter Dinklage	X-Men: Days of Future Past	Dr. Bolivar Trask	
2015	Rosamund Pike	Gone Girl	Amy Elliott-Dunne	
2015	J. K. Simmons	Whiplash	Terence Fletcher	
2016	Adam Driver	Star Wars: The Force Awakens	Ben Solo / Kylo Ren	
2016	Tom Hardy	The Revenant	John Fitzgerald	
2016	Samuel L. Jackson	Kingsman: The Secret Service	Richmond Valentine	
2016	Hugh Keays-Byrne	Mad Max: Fury Road	Immortan Joe	
2016	Ed Skrein	Deadpool	Francis Freeman / Ajax	
2016	James Spader	Avengers: Age of Ultron	Ultron	
2017	Jeffrey Dean Morgan	The Walking Dead	Negan	
2017	Wes Bentley	American Horror Story: Roanoke	Ambrose White	
2017	Mark Steger	Stranger Things	Demogorgon	
2017	Jared Leto	Suicide Squad	The Joker	
2017	Allison Williams	Get Out	Rose Armitage	
2018	Michael B. Jordan	Black Panther	N'Jadaka / Erik "Killmonger" Stevens	
2018	Josh Brolin	Avengers: Infinity War	Thanos	
2018	Adam Driver	Star Wars: The Last Jedi	Ben Solo / Kylo Ren	
2018	Aubrey Plaza	Legion	Lenny Busker	
2018	Bill Skarsgård	It	It / Pennywise the Dancing Clown	
2019	Josh Brolin	Avengers: Endgame	Thanos	
2019	Penn Badgley	You	Joe Goldberg	
2019	Jodie Comer	Killing Eve	Oksana Astankova / Villanelle	
2019	Joseph Fiennes	The Handmaid's Tale	Commander Fred Waterford	
2019	Lupita Nyong'o	Us	Adelaide Wilson / Red	
2021	Kathryn Hahn	WandaVision	Agatha Harkness	
2021	Aya Cash	The Boys	Klara Risinger / Stormfront	
2021	Giancarlo Esposito	The Mandalorian	Moff Gideon	
2021	Nicholas Hoult	The Great	Peter III of Russia	
2021	Ewan McGregor	Birds of Prey	Roman Sionis / Black Mask	
2022	Daniel Radcliffe	The Lost City	Abigail Fairfax	
2022	James Jude Courtney	Halloween Kills	Michael Myers / The Shape	
2022	Willem Dafoe	Spider-Man: No Way Home	Norman Osborn / Green Goblin	
2022	Colin Farrell	The Batman	Oswald "Oz" Cobb / The Penguin	
2022	Victoria Pedretti	You	Love Quinn	
2023	Elizabeth Olsen	Doctor Strange in the Multiverse of Madness	Wanda Maximoff / Scarlet Witch	
2023	—N/a	Cocaine Bear	The Bear	
2023	Jamie Campbell Bower	Stranger Things	Henry Creel / One / Vecna	
2023	Jenna Davis and Amie Donald	M3GAN	M3GAN (onscreen) and (voice)	
2023	Harry Styles	Don't Worry Darling	Jack Chambers	
