= Brett Cantor =

American nightclub owner (1967–1993)

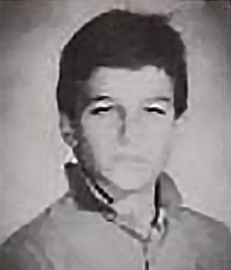
- Cantor as a junior at Beverly Hills High School, 1984
- Born: Brett Ross Cantor; November 5, 1967; New York City, U.S.
- Died: July 30, 1993 (aged 25); Los Angeles, California, U.S.
- Cause of death: Homicide
- Resting place: Mount Sinai Memorial Park Cemetery, Los Angeles
- Years active: 1990–1993
- Employer: Chrysalis Records
- Known for: Co-owning the Dragonfly nightclub and speculated connection of death to O. J. Simpson murder case

Brett Ross Cantor (November 5, 1967 – July 30, 1993) was an American record label executive, concert promoter and nightclub owner.

Cantor was born in New York City to Rhonda and Paul Cantor, who managed acts such as B. J. Thomas and Dionne Warwick. In the early 1970s, he and his family moved to the Los Angeles area. In the early 1990s, he served as an A&R executive for the Chrysalis Music Group. Cantor left Chrysalis to work briefly as an agent and then a promoter, putting together some of the largest concert and dance events in the city at that time. He also entered the nightclub business, taking a 10 percent stake in Dragonfly, a club known at the time for its 1970s and hip hop theme nights. At that time he was involved romantically with actress Rose McGowan.

Cantor was found dead in his Hollywood home on July 30, 1993; he had been beaten, stabbed repeatedly, and strangled. No suspect has ever been identified and the investigation remains open. His death was the subject of renewed interest a year later during preliminary motions in the trial of O. J. Simpson for the killings of his former wife, Nicole Brown Simpson, and Nicole's friend Ron Goldman, when Judge Lance Ito ruled that defense lawyers could have access to the investigatory file in the Cantor case. The defense had argued that the similarity of the three killings suggested the same person or persons had committed them. It has also been argued in books on the case that Cantor knew both Goldman and Nicole, and thus they may have been killed over mutual involvement in possibly illegal business activities.

== Life ==
Brett Ross Cantor was born on November 5, 1967, in New York City. His father Paul, a former William Morris agent who had moved into managing musicians like Dionne Warwick and B. J. Thomas, moved the family to Los Angeles four years later. In his young adulthood, Brett followed his father and older brothers Cliff and Marc into the music industry. At Chrysalis Music Group, Cantor worked as an A&R executive, looking for artists to sign and develop.

Cantor left Chrysalis to work, briefly, at the Agency for the Performing Arts. He then formed his own company called Underground Entertainment, which promoted raves. Events Underground organized at nightclubs, like Petting Zoo, Sanitarium, After Hours and L.A. Palooza were among the largest concert/dance parties in Los Angeles during that time.

When nightclub owner Steve Edelson converted one of his Frolic Rooms, on Santa Monica Boulevard in Hollywood, into a different club called Dragonfly, Cantor came in as his partner, holding a 10 percent share in the business. Dragonfly soon became known among the city's clubgoers for its theme nights. Wednesday nights were part of a series called Superfly, focusing on 1970s music, particularly disco, while Friday night's Riot featured hip hop. The club was profitable for its owners.

Cantor met actress Rose McGowan at the Dragonfly in the spring of 1993. They became romantically involved; in her 2018 autobiography Brave, McGowan credits him with helping her escape an abusive relationship that had led her to develop an eating disorder.

== Death ==
Early on the morning of July 30, 1993, Cantor left another nightclub, Club 434, with his promoter, Doug. Doug said Cantor dropped him off at home between 12:30 and 2:00 am. Cantor told him he had five dates that night and didn't know what he was going to do. He is not known to have been seen alive after that.

The following day, Brett was found dead by his brother, Cliff, who climbed over Brett's balcony to jimmy open his patio door after not being able to gain access through the front door. Brett was found in his bedroom, on the floor, with a pillow over his head and blanket over his body. He had been beaten, stabbed multiple times, and strangled. The investigation was moved from the local precinct to the downtown headquarters of the Los Angeles Police Department (LAPD), where it continues. No suspect has ever been identified.

=== Aftermath ===
Edelson could not bring himself to enter Dragonfly after Cantor's death, and sold his interest shortly afterwards. "Being there felt wrong, and it still does today" he told Los Angeles magazine in 2012. Cliff Cantor took over his brother's share and ran the club afterwards. Rose McGowen eventually started dating Cliff Cantor and they fell in love.

=== Speculated connection to O. J. Simpson murder case ===
Almost a year later, the bodies of Nicole Brown Simpson, former wife of American football player and actor O. J. Simpson, and Ronald Goldman, a waiter, were found dead with similar injuries at Brown's home in Brentwood. O. J. Simpson was arrested and charged with two counts of murder but later acquitted at trial.

In September 1994, Simpson's lawyers moved to have Judge Lance Ito allow them to review the LAPD's file on the Cantor homicide, claiming Cantor had similar injuries to that of Nicole and Goldman.

Ito granted the motion three weeks later, ruling that the material was "discoverable under Brady", referring to the 1963 U.S. Supreme Court decision that requires prosecutors to turn over any potentially exculpatory evidence their investigations uncover to the defense. The Simpson defense team also noted that the similarity of the killings themselves was not the only connection between the three murders. Goldman had once worked at Dragonfly as a waiter, where he was seen together with Cantor by other employees, and Nicole had often gone there with her friends to dance, raising the possibility that either or both were acquainted with Cantor.

After the Simpson-Goldman murders, detectives questioned Steve Edelson about possible connections. Later, Los Angeles Magazine ran a story suggesting that Edelson was behind all three slayings. He denied the claims, saying "the whole thing was ridiculous ... At the time there were some bad feelings in Hollywood about me."

Simpson's defense, which admitted at the time it requested the files that they were not sure there was a connection, never brought the Cantor killing into evidence. According to the coroner who autopsied Nicole’s body, the incisions were made with a long, thin blade whereas two knives were used in Brett’s murder. There were no similarities at all.

After the trial, author Joseph Bosco followed up on the Cantor homicide in his book A Problem of Evidence. He reported that the Cantor family had set up a tip hotline for information about Brett's death, but had it directed to them rather than the LAPD, and only shared one tip they received, which did not produce any useful leads. Cantor's family has publicly dismissed any connection between Cantor's death and the Simpson case; privately, Bosco wrote, the wife of Brett's other brother Matt, told him she believed there was a connection between the cases.

The LAPD detectives assigned to the Cantor case at the time Bosco inquired about it also denied any connection. Dallas-based author and private investigator William Dear likewise asserted in his 2014 book O. J. Simpson Is Innocent And I Can Prove It that Cantor was a diversion by the Simpson defense to protect Simpson's son Jason. Bosco stated that Cantor was under investigation by the FBI for possible involvement in the drug trade at the time of his death, and one of Jason's former girlfriends told Bosco that investigators found $130,000 in cash in a safe in Cantor's office after he was killed.

== See also ==
- Crime in Los Angeles
- List of unsolved murders (1980–1999)
- Murder of Michael Nigg, 1995 shooting death of a friend of Goldman's, also claimed by the Simpson defense team as possibly connected to the killings
