= Kevin Messick =

American producer

- Born: Kevin J. Messick; August 21, 1966 (age 60); California, U.S.
- Occupation: Film producer
- Spouse: Jill Messick (m. 1997; div. 2015)

Kevin J. Messick (born August 21, 1966) is an American film producer. He was nominated for two Academy Awards in the category Best Picture for the films Vice and Don't Look Up.

== Selected filmography ==
- Surviving the Game (1994)
- Batman Forever (1995)
- The Babysitter (1995)
- Truth or Consequences, N.M. (1997)
- A Lot like Love (2005)
- The Answer Man (2009)
- The Goods: Live Hard, Sell Hard (2009)
- The Other Guys (2010)
- Casa de mi padre (2012)
- Jack Reacher (2012)
- Hansel & Gretel: Witch Hunters (2013)
- Anchorman 2: The Legend Continues (2013)
- Tammy (2014)
- Get Hard (2015)
- The Big Short (2015)
- Daddy's Home (2015)
- The Boss (2016)
- Jack Reacher: Never Go Back (2016)
- Masterminds (2016)
- Daddy's Home 2 (2017)
- Ibiza (2018)
- Vice (2018; co-nominated with Dede Gardner, Jeremy Kleiner and Adam McKay)
- Don't Look Up (2021; co-nominated with Adam McKay)
- Fresh (2022)
- Wild Summon (2023)
- Thrash (2026)
- Monsanto (TBA)
