= Courtney Shayne =

Character in the film Jawbreaker

Courtney Alice Shayne
- Jawbreaker character
- Courtney Shayne as portrayed by Rose McGowan in Jawbreaker
- Portrayed by: Rose McGowan

In-universe information
- Gender: Female
- Occupation: Student at Reagan High School

Courtney Alice Shayne is a fictional character who appears in the 1999 film Jawbreaker, portrayed by Rose McGowan.

== Storyline ==
Courtney Alice Shayne is the manipulative, self-entitled, cruel, vindictive and sociopathic leader of an all-female quartet, "The Flawless Four" in Reagan High School. Together with two other friends, she kidnaps her rival, Elizabeth "Liz" Purr, as a prank. Courtney stuffs a jawbreaker into her mouth, gags her, and puts her into the trunk of a car. Later, the girls open the trunk and discover Liz is dead, having choked to death on the jawbreaker. Liz's best friend, Julie, wants to go to the police, but Courtney forbids her. Courtney spins an endless web of lies to cover up the murder and maintain her popularity. When Julie breaks away from the clique, she becomes a target for abuse and contempt throughout the school. Julie discovers, however, a recording in which Courtney admits to killing Liz, and the truth is made public just as Courtney is crowned prom queen. This angers the entire student body, who soon gangs up and turns her in to the authorities, blocking any paths of escape.

== Characterization ==
The narrator describes Courtney as "like Satan in heels". Anne Cohen calls her a "porcelain-skinned demon who rules the fictional Reagan High with soul-crushing terror."

Kathleen Sweeney suggests that 1999 "gave viewers two manipulative dark-haired Queen Bees": Kathryn Merteuil (Sarah Michelle Gellar) in Cruel Intentions and Courtney Shayne in Jawbreaker. In both films, "the Queens of Mean are punished by their peers, but not before laying out the game plan for wielding power in high school as visual "how-to" manuals for aspiring Queen Bees everywhere." Sweeny notes that Shayne holds "the rest of the girl tribe in her audacious thrall until she is outed".

== Legacy ==
McGowan was nominated for the MTV Movie Award for Best Villain for her portrayal of Shayne. Liz Hersey suggests that although Jawbreaker was panned, it would "go on to become a cult classic, thanks in large part to Courtney Shayne."

Anne Cohen notes that "20 years after the film’s release, Courtney Shayne continues to enjoy hero status among a generation for whom Jawbreaker was a preliminary introduction to the “Mean Girl” archetype." Cohen also suggests that Shayne is a "villain seemingly designed for the social media age".
