= Bad Judge =

American legal comedy television series

- Intertitle, showing Kate Walsh as Judge Rebecca Wright
- Genre: Sitcom
- Created by: Chad Kultgen; Anne Heche
- Starring: Kate Walsh; Tone Bell; Ryan Hansen; John Ducey; Miguel Sandoval
- Composer: Wayne Kramer
- Country of origin: United States
- Original language: English
- No. of seasons: 1
- No. of episodes: 13

Production
- Executive producers: Chad Kultgen; Anne Heche; Chris Henchy; Will Ferrell; Kate Walsh; Adam McKay; Betsy Thomas; Jill Sobel Messick
- Camera setup: Single-camera
- Running time: 22 minutes
- Production companies: Gary Sanchez Productions; Squirrelius (pilot only); 2 Out Rally Productions (episode 2-13); Universal Television

Original release
- Network: NBC
- Release: October 2, 2014 – January 22, 2015

Bad Judge is an American legal sitcom television series co-created by Chad Kultgen and Anne Heche. Kultgen and Heche also serve as executive producers, along with Will Ferrell, Kate Walsh, Adam McKay, Chris Henchy, Betsy Thomas, and Jill Sobel Messick for Universal Television.

The series premiered on NBC on October 2, 2014. NBC canceled the series on October 31, 2014; however, the network aired the full series 13-episode order. The series finale aired on January 22, 2015.

== Plot ==
The series chronicles the personal life (and wild lifestyle) of Rebecca Wright, a tough-as-nails judge serving on the Los Angeles County Circuit Court, whose time off the bench is spent partying and displaying reckless behavior.

== Cast ==
- Kate Walsh as Judge Rebecca Wright
- Ryan Hansen as Dr. Gary Boyd
- John Ducey as Tom Barlow
- Tone Bell as Tedward Mulray
- Miguel Sandoval as Judge Hernandez
- Amy Rhodes as Judy

== Reception ==
Bad Judge has received mostly negative reviews. On Rotten Tomatoes, the show holds a rating of 20%, based on 39 reviews, with an average rating of 4.5/10. The site's consensus reads, "A [sic] alleged comedy charged with minimal wit, Bad Judge is benched by stale jokes and a lead performance that lacks conviction." On Metacritic, the show has a score of 38 out of 100, based on 22 critics, indicating "generally unfavorable reviews".

The show also received criticism from the Miami-Dade chapter of the Florida Association for Women Lawyers, which asked NBC to cancel the series. Deborah Baker, president of the chapter, was quoted as saying, "The show is not only offensive to the many women judges who serve with the highest levels of integrity but also dangerous to the extent those who hold preconceived notions about women judges will find their sexist beliefs reaffirmed."

== Episodes ==
No.	Title	Directed by	Written by	Original release date	U.S. viewers (millions)
1	"Pilot"	Andrew Fleming	Story by : Chad Kultgen & Anne Heche; Teleplay by : Chad Kultgen	October 2, 2014	5.84
After a very late night, Judge Rebecca Wright awakes with a massive hangover and almost misses her first daily court case – a man charged with bigamy and falsifying identity. She denies the defendant bail thanks to the testimony of medical expert Dr. Gary Boyd, who is also Rebecca's lover. Gary's make-out session with her in chambers gets interrupted by Tedward, the court bailiff, with an urgent message. Ten-year-old Robby is on the phone and needs her help, since she put both his parents in jail and feels responsible. Judge Hernandez, her superior, wants her to focus on her work and not charity cases, but she acts as Robby's "counsel" in school meetings and also advises Robby to punch a bully. However, his punishment for hitting the bully results in a transfer to a group home for violent kids, causing Rebecca to help again. Meanwhile, the two wives of the bigamist issue statements on his behalf and call for charges to be dropped, urging the judge to show mercy. Rebecca doesn't send him to jail, but forces him to wear a T-shirt saying "I'm a convicted bigamist" and attend a course on feminism. Rebecca must later give a keynote address at a commencement ceremony, and she devises a last-second strategy to take Robby to Gary, hoping to reverse the transfer with a doctor's order. Her plan works. She then heads to a local bar to celebrate the day.
2	"Meteor Shower"	Jake Szymanski	Jamie Rhonheimer	October 9, 2014	5.24
After meeting a fireman, Billy, at a red light, Rebecca arrives at work in her non-air-conditioned van, sweaty and unprepared for the paparazzi focused on starlet Brianna Barton in her courtroom. Rebecca bans cellphone use and threatens to fine her for pouting. None of the paparazzi takes the blame for a ringing phone, so Rebecca arrests all of them for contempt of court. At her house, Rebecca welcomes Gary for a date night, complete with "special brownies" and a movie, but he has other plans. He suggests rescheduling and angrily leaves, when she refuses. She eats the brownies and calls 9-1-1, after having side effects. Billy is one of those responding and takes interest. Despite assuring Tedward that she has no plans to see Billy, she has sex with him anyway and immediately regrets it, due to his lack of intellect. Tedward pushes her to decide what she wants, something serious with Gary or something fun with Billy. Unsure, she avoids the question. Back in the empty courtroom, Tom makes a solid case for Brianna's sentence to alert other attention-seeking pop stars. Rebecca considers, then issues her final decision. Brianna will spend four weeks of community service at a convent outside of cellphone reach, forced to learn about herself and what she really wants. Rebecca heeds her own advice, taking a long drive in her van when it breaks down. She calls the only reliable person she knows, Tedward, and has an epiphany: the longest relationship in her life is with her van. At that moment, a semi rams into the van and totals it. Although devastated, she remains optimistic by thinking they can re-assemble the van.
3	"One Brave Waitress"	Linda Mendoza	Mary Fitzgerald	October 16, 2014	4.68
While teaching Rebecca a rear naked choke hold, Billy asks her to the Fireman's Ball. She avoids answering and chokes him unconscious. He later arrives at the courthouse, yelling her name in the hallways, desperate to get an answer. She instead invites him to the impound lot, where she buys a replacement for her wrecked van, only to leave him behind and drive away. Meanwhile, Tom asks her to hear a sexual harassment case involving Chad Forbes, manager of a restaurant where the servers wear scanty clothing. He assures her that a solid prosecution is ready, but Chad has hired sexy defense attorney Jill Sanchez in an attempt to distract the male jurors. Rebecca accepts the case, and Tom procures a diary detailing numerous abuses from Chad, who, during his testimony, confesses the entries are likely true. Unfortunately, the author of the diary, a former restaurant employee, refuses to testify. Despite Rebecca's allowing the diary into evidence, Judge Hernandez overrules her and the case is dismissed. Chad later gloats about his big win, and Rebecca chokes him out as well. At the local bar, she finally declines Billy's invitation and he is relieved. He actually feels the same way as she does – that they're not really compatible as a couple. He leaves, but not before offering his number, just in case.
4	"Knife to a Gunfight"	Reginald Hudlin	Aseem Batra	October 23, 2014	4.39
At the local bar, Rebecca and Tedward see Byron Cash, a career criminal recently released from prison. Tedward is worried Cash wants revenge on Rebecca for sending him to jail, but she assures him she can handle herself, even after finding a death threat on her rental van and creepy breathing noises on a voice mail. Convinced Rebecca needs protection, Tedward suggests she carry a gun. He demonstrates her vulnerability by breaking into her house at night. She agrees to go to the shooting range and impresses him with her sharpshooting skills. Meanwhile, Tom's latest case is that of Charlie Lewis, facing his third strike and a steep sentence. Rebecca views all three of his crimes as misunderstandings and advises him of his right to waive a jury trial, but Charlie feels confident in his strong case. Unfortunately, he chooses to represent himself and requires her assistance, in order to appear somewhat competent. During recess, Judge Hernandez reminds her to uphold the law, not to meddle with it. Ultimately, she asks Gary to perform a psychiatric evaluation on Charlie, who, it is discovered, suffers from a variety of mental ailments. Rebecca then asks Tom to push for a reduced charge. Charlie accepts and must spend two years in a psychiatric facility versus 20 years in prison. Later, Cash expresses his thanks to Rebecca. Prison changed his life for the better. It also revealed that stenographer Judy wrote the death threat, meant as an invite to join her at hot yoga, where she also accidentally called her. Rebecca then shows Tedward her enormous crossbow.
5	"Judge and Jury"	Eyal Gordin	Amy Rhodes	October 30, 2014	3.90
The annual bar games competition at Serpico's arrives, and Tedward and Rebecca intend on reclaiming the title. Tom needs a new partner to participate and recruits Gary, who is firmly against competition and declines. Thus, Tom finds an unlikely substitute in Judy, who not only displays a surprising competitive spirit but also has a knack for tossing onion rings on mounted deer antlers. However, Rebecca receives a jury summons. Despite all her best efforts to get out of it, she finds herself on a jury and answering to Chet, an annoying, strict jury foreman. She hopes that the trial will end in time for the bar games, but Chet and the other 10 jurors advocate that the defendant – a clearly harmless kid – be sent to prison. Rebecca must convince them otherwise, thus guaranteeing that Tedward target Gary as a replacement in the games. Gary rejects Tedward's pleas until Judy goads him by suggesting he is a failure at all competitions, including the one for Rebecca's love. He and Tedward battle Tom and Judy, while Rebecca manages to garner jurors to vote in favor of acquitting the defendant and against Chet. Ultimately, once she demonstrates how easily Chet himself could be painted as a criminal, he and the jury vote in Rebecca's favor. She then rushes to Serpico's in time to witness Gary and Tedward win the title in a tiebreaker. As the losers, Tom and Judy must spend the night in jail.
6	"What is Best in Life?"	Richie Keen	Chad Kultgen	November 6, 2014	3.68
Outside her courtroom, Rebecca meets her former law school nemesis, Dana McCoy, who is representing Tad Latardo, a carefree jock who mooned Ms. Mayhew, the plaintiff claiming irrevocable psychological injury from the experience and seeking millions in damages. Rebecca refuses to throw out the case, partly to prove to Dana that she deserves her judgeship. However, Dana's photographic evidence of a prominent tattoo on Tad's buttocks and Mayhew's testimony describing his behind as lacking any defining features jeopardizes the case. Mayhew senses the case's end and echoes Dana's sentiment that Rebecca is just one of many pretty judges appointed during Arnold Schwarzenegger's term as governor. Rebecca asks Tedward and Tom if she is just a pretty judge. Tedward reminds her of the upcoming Conan Con, an annual convention celebrating the classic film Conan the Barbarian, and Rebecca realizes she could ask Arnold himself. Unfortunately, he never shows at the convention, leaving Rebecca and Tedward in full "Conan" regalia. Tedward assures her that she is his favorite judge. Back in court, she notices Tad's sensitivity to his buttocks, and he admits that he got the tattoo after the mooning incident. She finally throws out the case, saying that mooning is not a crime. However, his lifelong punishment will be to bear his terrible tattoo. Dana makes a snarky comment, and Rebecca holds her in contempt of court. Her authority confirmed, Rebecca is complimented by Judge Hernandez, assuring her that, regardless of how she received her robe, she is still a great judge.
7	"Communication Breakdown"	Linda Mendoza	Robb Chavis	November 13, 2014	3.20
Rebecca celebrates her friend Michelle's (Angela Kinsey) recent divorce. Out on the town, they see Gary dancing with another woman. Although Rebecca denies any interest in Gary, she ends up in bed with him. Gary offers her a free stay at a nice hotel, courtesy of one of his clients. She agrees, leading Michelle to suggest they are in a relationship. Rebecca balks, until Gary reveals he booked the romantic anniversary suite. At dinner in the hotel, she accuses him of smothering her then ditches him. Meanwhile, Rebecca tries a case of loitering that involves deaf defendant Mr. Lin, who only speaks Mandarin sign language. Once the correct interpreters arrive, it becomes clear that the language barrier resulted in a total miscommunication and that Lin wasn't loitering; he was attempting to start a shoe-shining business. His "customers" thought he was trying to steal their shoes. Rebecca provides a sign and a designated space for his new business. The case prompts her into expressing interest in not committing to a relationship with Gary and remaining free. He agrees to never commit to her.
8	"The Cat's Out of the Bag"	Jay Karas	John Hindman	November 20, 2014	3.46
Tedward makes moves on his latest love interest, Angélica, the girlfriend of a soon-to-be-convicted felon. However, a technicality in the felon's case may cause Judge Hernandez to drop the charges, putting Tedward in the path of an angry, jealous boyfriend. Tedward helps Tom find a precedent to keep the boyfriend behind bars. Angélica introduces Tedward to her parents, which he does not want to happen. He urges Tom to argue for the boyfriend's innocence. The boyfriend is released, only to reveal to Tedward that he committed the crime in order to get away from Angélica because she is crazy. Meanwhile, Rebecca's ex-husband Keith returns after 10 years to let her know that their cat died. Although Rebecca harbors deep resentment for Keith, she loved the cat and agrees to attend its memorial. Keith gives a touching speech and asks her to rejoin their former group, Bitch Kitten, for a local concert. She eventually commits, until she discovers that the cat is still alive. Feeling manipulated, she quits the band, only to have Gary convince her that Keith simply cares about her and means well. Ultimately, she crashes Bitch Kitten's concert to play with them.
9	"Face Mask Mom"	Andrew Fleming	Liz Brixius	December 11, 2014	3.75
A heat wave in California on Christmas Eve affects the high-profile case of Regina "Face Mask Mom" Bullock, who got the nickname from tackling a young boy during a peewee football game after he allegedly committed a face mask penalty on her son. Tom passes out during a speech, and Tedward and Rebecca search for the union representative responsible for the air conditioning and force him to fix the dial. Back in the cooling courtroom, Mrs. Bullock demands that Rebecca hear her side of the story. In chambers, Mrs. Bullock confesses that her husband recently left and that this will be her family's first Christmas without him. Rebecca sentences her to six months of counseling and a court-ordered beach Christmas. The next day, she takes Mrs. Bullock to the beach where the two drink tequila and skinny dip in the ocean. That night, as part of the annual Secret Santa tradition, Rebecca goes to Judy's to give her a present and finds both Tom and Tedward also bearing gifts for Judy. All three of them drew Judy's name, as she rigged it to capitalize on the holiday.
10	"The Fixer"	John Putch	Chad Kultgen	January 1, 2015	2.11
Rebecca tries to help her friend and new roommate Michelle to get over her ex-husband. She gives Michelle's number to Derek, a bartender. After a date, he invites both of them to a party. Michelle panics, as Derek is half her age and they have nothing in common. Rebecca insists that she tries. Michelle ditches her in the middle of the party, and Rebecca returns home to find her crying in the bathtub. Michelle appreciates Rebecca's advice but is not ready to date again, but she does ponder returning to the party of handsome guys. Meanwhile, Tom demands a trial be delayed due to a missing key witness. Rebecca forces him and Tedward to team up with stakeout gear from the evidence room to find him. The pair locate and scare him with threats of possible jail time.
11	"Naked and Afraid"	Andrew Fleming	John Quaintance	January 8, 2015	3.19
Bored at home, Rebecca texts Gary a picture of herself naked. Judge Hernandez later informs her that a hacker she sent to jail gained access to her phone and uploaded the picture to the court's website. Everyone has now seen her naked. Even though Tedward secures her phone against future attacks, Judge Hernandez reassigns her to small claims court to keep a low profile while the judicial board reviews the situation. Her presiding over the exciting case of the Russian mob is now a dispute involving a squirrel, that may or may not be the defendant's pet, who attacked someone. To also prove to the board and Judge Hernandez that she recognizes her mistake and wants to rectify her problem, Rebecca attends a Sex Addicts Anonymous meeting and attempts to write an apology letter. With a little guidance from Gary, however, she realizes that she is not sorry for the naked photo. At her hearing, she brings up her own victimization by the hacker and argues that anyone over 40 who can take their own naked photo should be lauded. The board issues her a warning and allows her to return to her courtroom.
12	"Lockdown"	Reginald Hudlin	Jamie Rhonheimer	January 15, 2015	2.71
Luxury box seats at the Kings hockey game, courtesy of Judge Hernandez, await the staff, but police announce that a gunman barricaded himself in a bank across the street. The courtroom is put on lockdown. To pass the time, Rebecca initiates a game of secrets that leads Gary to relate that he was in a nine-year relationship with a French woman named Cecile, a globetrotting human-rights attorney. Rebecca thinks he might still love Cecile. Meanwhile, Tedward scavenges for food, only to remember his hidden earthquake kit's four granola bars. Finding it gone, he suspects an inside job. Rebecca suggests a polygraph test for everyone. Under pressure, Tom breaks and admits he took one granola bar and Judy stole two others. Rebecca insists that Gary take the test, but he soon finds himself answering questions about Cecile from Rebecca. He stops her to confess that he doesn't love Cecile because he loves her. Rebecca realizes that she loves him, too, as the lockdown ends. At the hockey game, Tedward gorges on food, Rebecca yells obscenities, and Gary beams next to her.
13	"Case Closed"	Andrew Fleming	Story by : Andrew Lee; Teleplay by : Lizzy Pace & Matt Rickett	January 22, 2015	2.85
Judge Hernandez informs Rebecca that if she hears three more cases by Thursday, she will break the record as the youngest judge to hear 1,000 cases. However, the first case involves several geriatric witnesses and moves very slowly. To guarantee the record, Rebecca takes a shift in night court and skates through two cases in quick succession. The important third case involves a fire-breathing magician who demonstrates his act and sets off the emergency sprinkler system. The record still stands. Meanwhile, Tedward and Gary shop for a present for Rebecca's record. They both see a remarkably familiar van. Tom, Tedward, Judy and Rebecca quickly work an impromptu case, a quick and dirty dine-and-dash, in the final four minutes before the deadline, and Rebecca sets the record. Afterwards, Judge Hernandez gifts her his lucky bolo tie that he received when he hit 1,000 cases, but Gary and Tedward surprise her with an exact replica of her van. The next day, she wakes up with Gary by her side and starts her day as she always does: in a rush and shockingly late.

=== Ratings ===
No.	Title	Air date	Rating/share (18–49)	Viewers (millions)
1	"Pilot"	October 2, 2014	1.3/4	5.84
2	"Meteor Shower"	October 9, 2014	1.3/4	5.24
3	"One Brave Waitress"	October 16, 2014	1.2/4	4.68
4	"Knife to a Gunfight"	October 23, 2014	1.0/3	4.39
5	"Judge and Jury"	October 30, 2014	0.9/3	3.90
6	"What is Best in Life?"	November 6, 2014	0.9/3	3.68
7	"Communication Breakdown"	November 13, 2014	0.9/3	3.20
8	"The Cat's Out of the Bag"	November 20, 2014	0.9/3	3.46
9	"Face Mask Mom"	December 11, 2014	1.1/3	3.75
10	"The Fixer"	January 1, 2015	0.5/1	2.11
11	"Naked and Afraid"	January 8, 2015	0.8/2	3.19
12	"Lockdown"	January 15, 2015	0.7/2	2.71
13	"Case Closed"	January 22, 2015	0.7/2	2.85

== Accolades ==
Bad Judge was nominated for a People's Choice Award for Favorite New TV Comedy.
