= Jawbreaker (film) =

1999 film by Darren Stein

- Theatrical release poster
- Directed by: Darren Stein
- Written by: Darren Stein
- Produced by: Lisa Tornell; Stacy Kramer
- Starring: Rose McGowan; Rebecca Gayheart; Julie Benz; Judy Greer; Chad Christ; Ethan Erickson; Carol Kane; Pam Grier
- Cinematography: Amy Vincent
- Edited by: Troy T. Takaki
- Music by: Stephen Endelman
- Production companies: Kramer-Tornell Productions; Crossroads Films
- Distributed by: TriStar Pictures
- Release dates: January 30, 1999 (Sundance); February 19, 1999 (United States)
- Running time: 87 minutes
- Country: United States
- Language: English
- Budget: $3.5 million
- Box office: $3.1 million

Jawbreaker is a 1999 American dark comedy crime film written and directed by Darren Stein. Starring Rose McGowan, Rebecca Gayheart, Julie Benz, Judy Greer, Chad Christ, Ethan Erickson, Carol Kane, and Pam Grier, the film follows the "Flawless Four", the most popular girls at Reagan High School, who cover up the killing of fellow member Elizabeth "Liz" Purr after a kidnapping prank on her 17th birthday goes awry. When Fern Mayo (Greer) encounters the trio staging a crime scene with her body, Courtney Shayne (McGowan) and Marcie "Foxy" Fox (Benz) blackmail her into joining them, causing Julie Freeman (Gayheart) to question her place within the clique.

Stein initially conceived Jawbreaker as a horror film, but the screenplay instead developed as a teen film with elements of dark comedy, drawing inspiration from Carrie (1976) and Heathers (1988), as well as the films of John Hughes. Stein explained his concept for the film as, "The jawbreaker just came to represent the duality of the poppy sweetness of the girls, of high school and of youth, versus the whole idea that this thing could break your jaw." Principal photography began in Los Angeles on January 18, 1998, and concluded on March 10.

Jawbreaker premiered at the Sundance Film Festival on January 30, 1999, and was theatrically released by TriStar Pictures in the United States on February 19, 1999. The film received negative reviews from critics and was a box office failure, grossing $3.1 million against its $3.5 million production budget. Despite this, McGowan was nominated for the MTV Movie Award for Best Villain at the 1999 MTV Movie Awards. Initially panned as derivative of other teen films, the film became a cult classic in the years since its release, with McGowan's performance and the costumes in particular earning reappraisal.

== Plot ==
The "Flawless Four" are the most popular senior girls attending Reagan High School, consisting of Courtney Alice Shayne, Marcie Fox "Foxy," Julie Freeman, and Elizabeth "Liz" Purr. Of the four, Liz is considered the most beautiful and kind-hearted. Julie is admired because of her looks and her friendship with Liz, while queen bee Courtney and her follower Marcie, demand respect through terror.

On the morning of Liz's 17th birthday, Courtney, Marcie, and Julie kidnap Liz and gag her with a jawbreaker. They lock her in the trunk of a car and drive off, planning to take her to a restaurant for breakfast. Upon opening the trunk, they discover Liz has choked to death on the jawbreaker.

Julie wants to report the situation to the police, but Courtney instead calls the school posing as Liz's mother to tell them Liz is ill and cannot attend; the three later go to school. To explain the circumstances of Liz's death, Courtney devises a story that she was killed by a rapist. She also later spreads false rumors to Detective Vera Cruz that Liz was actually a rebellious and promiscuous girl who frequents bars for hookups.

Assistant Principal, Miss E. Sherwood sends outcast Fern Mayo to deliver Liz's homework to her after school. Fern, who admires Liz to the point of worship, is happy to oblige. Upon arriving at the house, she encounters the three girls planting Liz's dead body in her bed and flees in horror. The girls catch her and buy her silence by enticing her to take Liz's place in the Flawless Four. Fern is given a dramatic makeover to a beautiful exchange student named "Vylette."

Overwhelmed by guilt at her part in Liz's death, Julie distances herself from the clique, but is tormented by her former friends and becomes a new target for bullying throughout the school. Her only real friend during this time is her boyfriend, Zach Tartak, the drama lead in the school play. As Vylette's popularity soars, Julie silently watches as Courtney weaves a web of lies to cover up the murder. Julie speculates that, after they returned Liz to her house, Courtney seduced a stranger at a bar to have sex with in Liz's bed, making it seem as though he had raped Liz, but she needs to find proof of her theory.

Vylette becomes intoxicated with her new-found popularity, which has eclipsed Courtney's own. In retaliation, Courtney and Marcie post enlarged yearbook photos of Fern Mayo all over the school, revealing Vylette's former identity and leaving her humiliated. Julie sympathizes with Fern and forgives her for falling under Courtney's influence.

While Courtney attends the senior prom with jock Dane Sanders, Julie is at home going through a bag of Liz's belongings that were given to her by Liz's mother. Julie finds the recordable birthday card which Courtney was holding after putting Liz's body in her bed, and discovers the card recorded Courtney's admission to killing Liz. Armed with this evidence, Julie, Fern, and Zach travel to the prom to expose her.

When Dane and Courtney are announced as prom king and queen, Zach secretly broadcasts the card's message "I killed Liz. I killed the teen dream. Deal with it.” over the sound system, revealing the truth behind Liz's death. Dane, mortified and disgusted, quickly abandons Courtney while Marcie hides under a table. With her crimes now exposed, Courtney flees as the rest of the angry students berate and pelt her with corsages. Julie gleefully snaps a picture of her former friend's anguished face to immortalize the occasion. The picture, taken while Courtney was distraught with makeup smeared all over her face, ends up in school's yearbook. The film ends with Fern's quote, "This is high school, Detective Cruz. What is a friend anyway?" as the yearbook closes.

== Cast ==
- Rose McGowan as Courtney Alice Shayne
- Rebecca Gayheart as Julie "Jules" Freeman
- Julie Benz as Marcie "Foxy" Fox
- Judy Greer as Fern "Vylette" Mayo
- Chad Christ as Zach Tartak
- Charlotte Ayanna as Elizabeth "Liz" Purr
- Ethan Erickson as Dane Sanders
- Pam Grier as Detective Vera Cruz
- Carol Kane as Miss E. Sherwood (Assistant Principal)
- Marilyn Manson as The Stranger
- Tatyana Ali as Brenda Chadwell
- William Katt as Mr. Purr
- P. J. Soles as Mrs. Purr
- Jeff Conaway as Mr. Fox
- Sandy Martin as Nurse

== Production ==
=== Development ===
Writer-director Darren Stein initially conceived the screenplay for Jawbreaker as a horror film about a prank gone awry. "I went to an all-boys school. I only got to apprehend co-educational teenage culture through movies like Carrie or Heathers or the John Hughes movies," said Stein. "So I was like, 'Oh, that’s so cool. Michelle got kidnapped; that would be a really great idea for a horror movie.' What if the girls who kidnapped her are like Heathers-type girls, you know? This trio of really bitchy girls and she accidentally dies? That’s the horror of it."

=== Casting ===
Stein brought his script to executives at Columbia TriStar, who agreed to finance the film if he could cast Natalie Portman, Kate Winslet, or Rose McGowan. The role of Julie originally went to Rachael Leigh Cook, who was eventually replaced with Rebecca Gayheart because the producers felt she did not have the right chemistry with the two other actresses. Gayheart had auditioned for the roles of Fern and Marcie before she was selected for Julie. Marilyn Manson, who was then dating McGowan, agreed to appear in a non-speaking cameo role.

=== Filming ===
On a small budget of $3.5 million, Jawbreaker was filmed at locations in and around the Los Angeles area in 1998. Reagan High School was actually University High School in West Los Angeles, with the cafeteria scenes filmed at Notre Dame High School in Sherman Oaks. The diner that the girls drive up to at the beginning of the film is Johnie's Broiler in Downey, California, the filming site for many film and television productions. McGowan based her performance on that of Gene Tierney's sociopathic character in Leave Her to Heaven (1945).

The distinctive costumes were designed by Vikki Barrett, who drew on 1980s and 1950s-era fashion trends blended with fetishistic elements like lycra skirts, all in bright candy colors to evoke the jawbreaker.

== Release ==
Before the film could be released, the MPAA objected to a graphic sex scene between McGowan's and Marilyn Manson's characters, which had to be cut down to give the film an R rating instead of an NC-17. To accompany the release of the film, Imperial Teen's music video for the song "Yoo Hoo" featured McGowan as Courtney Shayne harassing the band members with jawbreakers.

Jawbreaker premiered at the Sundance Film Festival on January 30, 1999, before being released theatrically in the United States on February 19, 1999.

=== Home media ===
Columbia TriStar Home Video released Jawbreaker on VHS and DVD on June 22, 1999. On April 5, 2011, it was released on Blu-ray for the first time. Sony Pictures Home Entertainment issued a 20th anniversary Blu-ray on November 19, 2019, featuring a new audio commentary with cast and crew members.

== Reception ==
=== Box office ===
During its opening weekend, Jawbreaker earned $1,603,425 at the United States box office, ranking number 13. It remained in exhibition for 45 weeks, grossing a total of $3,117,085 domestically.

=== Critical response ===
On the review aggregator website Rotten Tomatoes, 17% of 65 critics' reviews are positive, with an average rating of 3.3/10. The website's consensus reads: "This throwaway comedy falls victim to its hip sensibilities." Metacritic, which uses a weighted average, assigned the film a score of 22 out of 100, based on 21 critics, indicating "generally unfavorable" reviews. Audiences surveyed by CinemaScore gave Jawbreaker a grade D+.

A number of film critics noted the film's similarities to Heathers (1988), deeming it derivative as a result. Desson Howe of The Washington Post compared the film negatively against Heathers, concluding: "Unfortunately, Jawbreaker fails to answer the unspoken question it raises: Why sit through a lesser imitation?" Mary Elizabeth Williams of Salon also commented on the film's parallels to Heathers, writing that it "fancies itself a wicked satire on youth, death and the disposability of image... Jawbreaker may promise a series of gleefully cheap thrills, but in the end all it delivers is a whole lot of bad taste."

Lisa Alspector of the Chicago Reader also deemed the film as "derivative," adding: "Lame shock scenes, crucial plot points inserted without setups, and an unsuccessful attempt to exploit the camp value of some actors cast in minor parts are the least of the problems in this black comedy." Paul Tatara, writing for CNN, was unimpressed by the film's exaggerated visual elements and lambasted McGowan's performance in the film, though he wrote favorably of Gayheart's performance, noting: "There's something invitingly earthy and open about her, even as she's caught up in the director's empty, film-school shenanigans." Roger Ebert gave the film one and a half out of four stars, stating, "The movie is a slick production of a lame script ... If anyone in the plot had the slightest intelligence, the story would implode."

James Berardinelli gave the film a more favorable two and a half out of four stars, calling it "palatable, and occasionally even clever", but concluding, "while the film offers more than a Heathers rehash, it never fully develops its own identity". Janet Maslin of The New York Times praised the film's style, noting that "Stein plays enthusiastically with every spinning circle and candylike prop he can find. The film's bright look and visual energy are much more liberating than the machinations of its teen queens." The Milwaukee Journal Sentinel's Nick Carter also gave the film a favorable assessment, praising it as "a low-level cult classic, good for future rewind moments." Kevin Thomas of the Los Angeles Times praised the film's direction, assessing it as a "wickedly hilarious send-up of high school mores" with a "dark view of teenagers."

McGowan was nominated for the MTV Movie Award for Best Villain, but lost to Matt Dillon for There's Something About Mary.

== Legacy ==
Despite the negative critical feedback, Jawbreaker found success through home video release and subsequent television airings; it has developed a cult following. Vice magazine called the film a "teen classic" when it published a retrospective in 2016 titled "Perverting the Youth of America: The Oral History of Teen Classic Jawbreaker". Similarities have been drawn between Jawbreaker, Heathers, and the 2004 film Mean Girls. Dazed magazine published a similar feature, crediting the film with inspiring 2004's Mean Girls, and praising the dark tones and performances.

McGowan's Courtney Shayne has become something of a pop culture icon on social media, with TribecaFilm.com declaring of McGowan's performance that "...every single line-reading was a thing of Bette Davis-aspiring beauty, and with any justice, it's a performance that will only grow in esteem over time."

Jawbreaker's costumes have also been celebrated, drawing praise from the likes of Vogue and Rookie magazines. The scene where the actresses strut down the hallway in slow-motion to Imperial Teen's "Yoo Hoo" has become a signature feature of the film, drawing homage in film and television, most notably Mean Girls, and being parodied in films like Not Another Teen Movie (2001).

In 2014, Judy Greer said in an interview: "I really didn't think it was anything special while we were shooting it, but when I saw the final product, I knew it was really good. I was so proud of it. I thought it looked beautiful. It had just the right amount of sexy, pop culture fun to it. I do think it's quite special."

== Music ==
=== Soundtrack ===
1. "Yoo Hoo" (Imperial Teen) – 3:31
2. "I See" (Letters to Cleo) – 3:56
3. "Next to You" (Ednaswap) – 2:35
4. "Don't Call Me Babe" (Shampoo) – 2:58
5. "Bad Word for a Good Thing" (The Friggs) – 2:53
6. "Stay in Bed" (Grand Mal) – 4:49
7. "Flow" (Transister) – 5:59
8. "She Bop" (Howie Beno feat. Cruella DeVille, a.k.a. Lucia Cifarelli) – 3:06
9. "Water Boy" (Imperial Teen) – 1:36
10. "Rock You Like a Hurricane" (Scorpions) – 4:14
11. "Rock 'n' Roll Machine" (The Donnas) – 2:54
12. "Beat You Up" (The Prissteens) – 2:36
13. "Trouble" (Shampoo) – 3:21

Songs not included on the official soundtrack

- Veruca Salt, "Volcano Girls" (Opening Credits) – 3:30
- The Cars, "Good Times Roll" (The Girls Carry Liz Upstairs) – 3:46
- Jack Drag, "Where Are We" (Julie Calls Fern) – 3:16
- Connie Francis, "Lollipop Lips" (Courtney and Dane's Scene) – 2:14
- Tiffany, "I Think We're Alone Now" (Marcie's Dad Singing during Dinner, Not Played) – 3:50
- Emily Grogan, "No Hitch" (Julie Walking during School Speaker Announcement) – 4:16
- The Friggs, "Heartbreaker" (Vylette Strutting at School) – unknown (Note: "Heartbreaker" was recorded specifically for the film on a short turnaround and left off the official soundtrack; there is no evidence of any standalone release of this track.)
- Chesney Hawkes (credited as "ebb"), "Almost You" (Julie and Zach Sitting in the Auditorium) – 4:20
- Hub (Hub Moore), "I Believe You" (Julie Before Prom in Her Bedroom) – 3:48
- Bing Crosby, "Young at Heart" (The End of Prom) – 3:18
- The Donnas, "Checkin' It Out" (Closing Credits) – 3:13

Connie Francis did not approve the use of her song "Lollipop Lips" in this film, which was used without her permission and was heard during a sex scene. Francis filed two lawsuits over the unauthorized use of her song in Jawbreaker. In 2002, Francis sued her record company Universal Music Group (UMG) for allowing several of her songs to be synchronized to "sexually themed" movies. Jawbreaker was specifically mentioned by name in the lawsuit. Francis was unsuccessful and the judge threw the case out of court. The second lawsuit involved Francis suing the producers of Jawbreaker for the unauthorized use of "Lollipop Lips" in the film.

=== Score ===
The Jawbreaker: Original Motion Picture Score was composed and performed by Stephen Endelman, consisting of 15 tracks. It was manufactured by Varèse Sarabande Records and distributed by Universal Music & Video Distribution.

=== Track list ===
1. "The Birthday Present" – 2:53
2. "The Plot" – 1:47
3. "The Cover Up" – 2:55
4. "Fern Transformed" – 2:05
5. "School Walkway" – 0:38
6. "The Arrival" – 2:29
7. "Vera Cruz Interrogation" – 1:55
8. "Fern's Starfish" – 1:18
9. "Fern Exposed" – 2:05
10. "Nightmare" – 0:32
11. "Jawbreaker" – 1:49
12. "The Drive-In" – 1:47
13. "Graduation" – 2:38
14. "Young At Heart" – 2:43 (Note: This "Young At Heart" version of the song did not appear in the movie. The liner notes credit it as written by Carolyn Leigh and "Johnny Roberts" — likely a printing error, as the actual co-writer of "Young at Heart" (1954) is Johnny Richards.)
15. "Class of '99" – 2:09

== Musical adaptation ==
Jawbreaker: The Musical is set to make its stage debut as a workshop production at the Hudson Theatre in Hollywood, running September 4–20, 2026, produced by Knot Free Productions. Directed by Matt DiCarlo with choreography by Jay Jackson (also known as drag performer Laganja Estranja), book by Darren Stein, with original music by Jeff Thomson and lyrics by Jordan Mann.

Rebecca Gayheart, who played Julie Freeman in the original film, will return to play Principal Sherwood. She is joined by Aj Paramo as Fern Mayo, Méami as Courtney Shayne, Kristen Seggio as Julie Freeman, Jane Papageorge as Marcie Fox, Will Riddle as Zach Tartak (billed as "Zack Tartak" in the production's promotional materials), Mireya Zoé Nevel as Elizabeth Purr, and Brandon Keith Rogers as Dane Sanders, with ensemble members Dominic DeCicco, Mitchell Gerrard Johnson, Kayla Quiroz, and Avery Rehl. Casting for the production was managed by Tal Fox Studio.

== Earlier musical adaptation ==
In 2010, efforts began to adapt Jawbreaker into a musical. On July 29, 2010, a Los Angeles concert presentation occurred starring Shoshana Bean, Lesli Margherita and Jenna Leigh Green. Original film writer-director Darren Stein returned to write the book while Jeff Thomson and Jordan Mann wrote original music and lyrics. Jen Bender directed the production with musical direction by Adam Gubman.

On October 13, 2011, a Manhattan reading occurred with Diana DeGarmo in the role of Fern Mayo. Gabriel Barre directed this reading.

On September 26 and 27, 2013, MadBromance Productions hosted a 29-hour reading of Jawbreaker: The Musical in Manhattan. Starring Elizabeth Gillies as Courtney Shayne, Gillies was joined by JoJo as Julie, Diana DeGarmo as Fern Mayo, and Libby Servais as Foxy. Gabriel Barre directed once again while Shea Sullivan choreographed, and James Sampliner provided musical direction.

=== Demo recording ===
A six-track demo CD for Jawbreaker: The Musical was produced by MadBromance Productions during the show's early development, tied to their 29-hour reading held September 26–27, 2013, in Manhattan. The demo was distributed at an industry-invite-only workshop performance and was never commercially released.

Track listing:

1. "Dress to Kill" – 5:02
2. "Peachy Keen" – 4:38
3. "Pretty Little Games" – 4:53
4. "All About Vylette" – 3:19
5. "Queen Bitch" – 3:25
6. "Skin Deep" – 4:18

Music by Jeff Thomson, lyrics by Jordan Mann, book by Darren Stein, based on his film.

The musical, at that time, was described as having a "propulsive pop score that ranges from Lady Gaga-style synth pop to lush melodic ballads, Jawbreaker feels both timeless and today, presenting a mythic high school story that speaks to the teenager in us all."

== Television series ==
In February 2017, it was announced that the film would be reimagined as a television series for E! Darren Stein, the writer and director of the original film, was said to write and produce the series, but no further developments were made.
