= Rose McGowan =

American actress and activist (born 1973)

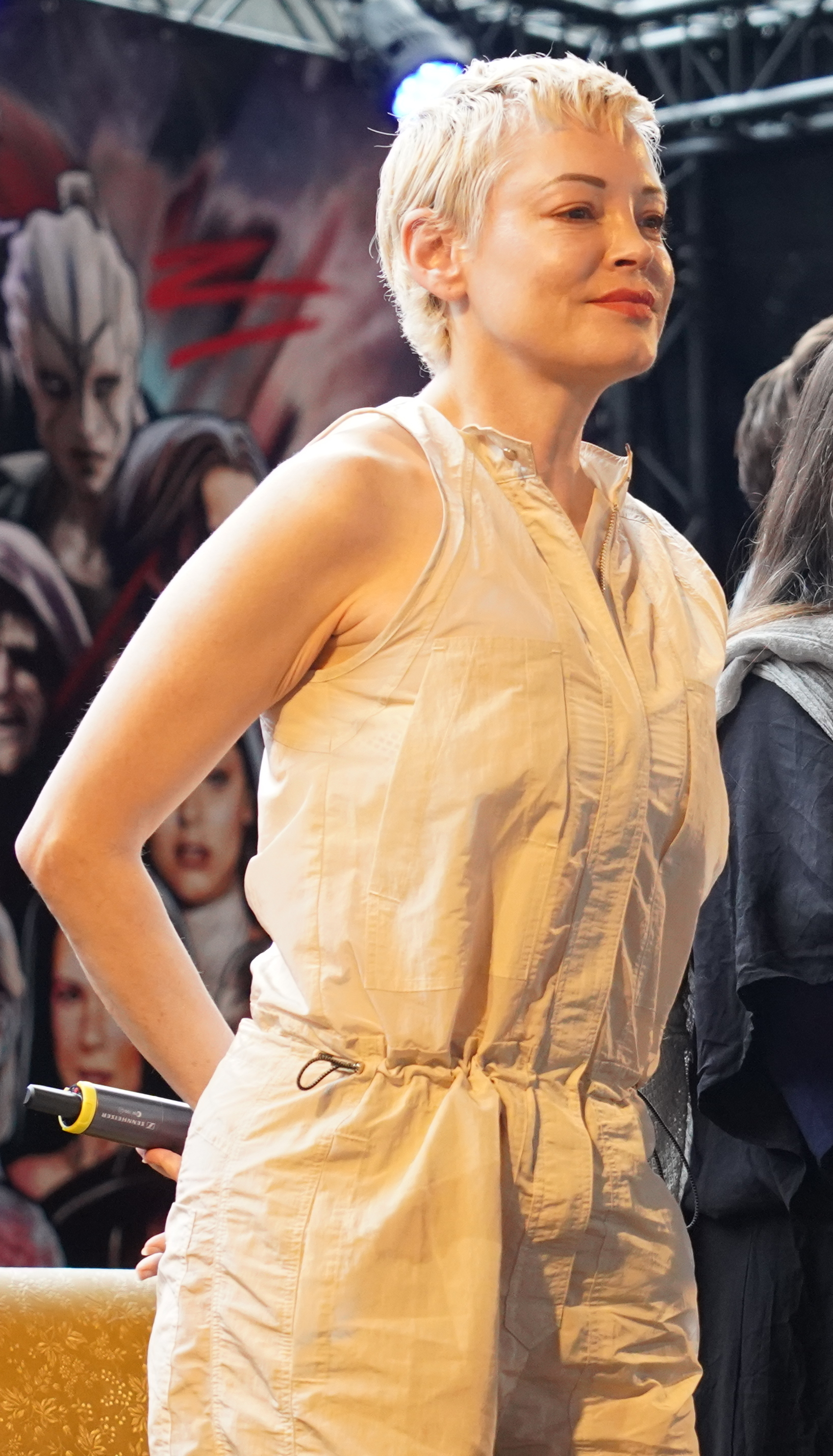
- McGowan in 2023
- Born: Rósa Arianna McGowan; September 5, 1973 (age 53); Florence, Italy
- Citizenship: United States; Italy; Mexico
- Occupations: Actress; activist
- Years active: 1990–present (actress); 2018–present (social media personality; activist; podcaster)
- Spouse: Davey Detail (m. 2013; div. 2016)
- Website: rosemcgowan.com

Rósa Arianna McGowan (Note: While sources have claimed that McGowan's birth name is "Rose Arianna McGowan" or simply "Rose McGowan", she stated in 2020 that her real name is "Rósa Arianna McGowan.") (born September 5, 1973) is an American actress and activist. After her film debut in a brief role in the comedy Encino Man (1992), she achieved recognition for her performance in the dark comedy The Doom Generation (1995), receiving an Independent Spirit Award nomination.

McGowan had her breakthrough in the horror film Scream (1996) and subsequently headlined the films Going All the Way (1997), Devil in the Flesh (1998), and Jawbreaker (1999). During the 2000s, she became known to television audiences for her role as Paige Matthews in The WB supernatural drama series Charmed (2001–2006). She starred in the double-feature film Grindhouse (2007), for which she was nominated for the Saturn Award for Best Supporting Actress.

In 2017, Time recognized McGowan as one of the Silence Breakers, the magazine's Person of the Year, for speaking out about sexual assault and harassment, specifically in regard to the Harvey Weinstein sexual abuse cases and the MeToo movement. In 2018, she released a memoir, Brave, and starred in the four-part documentary series Citizen Rose.

== Early life ==
Rósa Arianna McGowan was born on September 5, 1973, in Florence, Italy, to Irish artist Daniel McGowan, and American writer, Terri. She has two younger half-siblings. Her father ran an Italian chapter of the Children of God, which he and his wife were members of until 1978. McGowan spent her early childhood at the group's communes, often traveling through Europe with her parents.

Through her father's art contacts in Italy, she became a child model and appeared in Vogue Bambini and many other Italian magazines. Her parents returned to her mother's native United States when she was 10 years old, and settled in Eugene, Oregon. McGowan had an untraditional childhood, living as a teenage runaway in Portland, Oregon and associating with a group of drag queens in the city. When her parents divorced, she lived with her father in Seattle, Washington, attended Roosevelt High School and Nova Alternative High School, and worked at McDonald's. She took ballet lessons until she was 13. At 15, she officially emancipated herself from her parents and moved to Los Angeles.

== Career ==
=== 1990s: Early work and breakthrough ===
After making her Hollywood film debut with a brief role in the comedy Encino Man (1992) with Pauly Shore and Brendan Fraser, McGowan was cast in the leading role in Gregg Araki's dark comedy The Doom Generation (1995), which revolved around a threesome of teens who embark on a sex and violence-filled journey. The film brought her a much wider recognition and the attention of film critics; she received a nomination for Best Debut Performance at the 1996 Independent Spirit Awards. McGowan next obtained the role of Tatum Riley in the slasher cult film Scream (1996), as the casting director believed she best embodied the "spunky", "cynical" but "innocent" nature of the ill-fated character. Upon its release, the film became a huge critical and financial success, grossing over $100 million in North America and $173 million worldwide. Amid her growing public profile, she was the cover model for the Henry Mancini tribute album Shots in the Dark, which was released in 1996, and became the face of American clothing company Bebe from 1998 to 1999. In 1997, she appeared in the short film Seed, directed by San Francisco-born filmmaker Karin Thayer, and played opposite Peter O'Toole in the 1998 film adaptation of the Dean Koontz novel Phantoms.

McGowan spent the majority of the late 1990s headlining a variety of independent films, including roles in Nowhere (1997), where she reunited with Araki, as well as Southie (1996), Going All the Way (1997), Lewis and Clark and George (1997), and Devil in the Flesh (1998), where she usually played seductive and mysterious characters. She gained much attention for the revealing fishnet outfit she wore to the 1998 MTV Video Music Awards. While dating Marilyn Manson, McGowan appeared in a music video for the song "Coma White"; she also performed backing vocals on the song "Posthuman". Both of these songs appear on the album Mechanical Animals (1998). In the dark comedy Jawbreaker (1999), she portrayed Courtney Shayne, a popular yet malevolent high school student who tries to cover up her involvement in a classmate's murder. McGowan based her performance on that of Gene Tierney's sociopathic character in Leave Her to Heaven (1945). To accompany the release of the film, Imperial Teen's music video for the song Yoo Hoo featured McGowan as her character harassing the band members with jawbreakers.Jawbreaker was a critical and commercial failure, but found success through home video release and subsequent television airings; it has developed a cult following. McGowan earned a nomination for Best Villain at the 1999 MTV Movie Awards.

=== 2000s: Rise to prominence and critical recognition ===
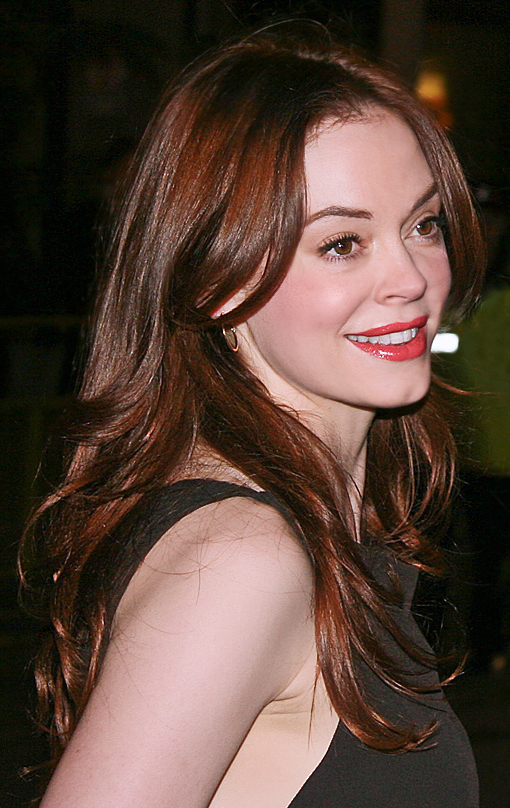
McGowan at the 2008 Toronto International Film Festival

In 2001, McGowan was cast for the role of Paige Matthews in the popular WB supernatural drama series Charmed, as a replacement for the lead actress Shannen Doherty, who had left the show. In the show, about the trio of witches using their combined powers to protect innocent lives from evil beings, McGowan played the character from season four until its final eighth season. In the Charmed episode "Sense and Sense Ability", McGowan performed, in character, a cover of the Peggy Lee classic "Fever". In a review of the fourth season, Leigh H. Edwards of PopMatters added that the addition of Paige was "contrived and clunky", but welcomed the idea of McGowan joining the show as a witch "since she has major goth cred as Marilyn Manson's former flame". DVD Verdict's Cynthia Boris wrote that McGowan brought "a youthfulness" and "a fresh viewer perspective" to Charmed, further noting that "fans have come to enjoy her presence on the show." Sara Paige and Rachel Hyland of Geek Speak magazine described Paige as "snarky, compassionate and whimsical", and believed that "McGowan was well-suited for the role." At the 2002 Wand Awards, McGowan was nominated for Best New Cast Member and at the 2005 Family Television Awards, she won Favorite Sister, for her performance.

McGowan starred alongside Fraser, Bridget Fonda, and Whoopi Goldberg in the dark fantasy comedy Monkeybone (2001) as a cat girl from a limbo-like carnival landscape where nightmares are entertainment. Budgeted at US$75 million, the film only made US$7.6 million; McGowan felt that film "would've been incredible (at least the underworld part) if the men at 20th Century Fox (the suits) hadn't fired the director, a true artist, Henry Selick [half] the way through filming", and called his dismissal a "profoundly stupid move". During Charmed, McGowan portrayed actress-singer Ann-Margret in the CBS miniseries Elvis (2005), about the life of Elvis Presley. She also appeared briefly as the roommate of the titular character in Brian De Palma's The Black Dahlia (2006), a film noir shot in Los Angeles and Bulgaria and opposite Josh Hartnett, Scarlett Johansson, Aaron Eckhart and Hilary Swank.

In 2007, McGowan headlined Grindhouse, a double-feature horror film by directors Quentin Tarantino and Robert Rodriguez. In Rodriguez's segment, Planet Terror, she starred as a go-go dancer and the leader of a group of rebels attempting to survive an onslaught of zombie-like creatures as they feud with a rogue military unit, while in Tarantino's segment, Death Proof, she played a brief role as a victim of a misogynistic, psychopathic stuntman who targets young women with his "death proof" stunt car. She performed three songs from the Planet Terror portion of Grindhouse, released on the film's soundtrack by the Varèse Sarabande label. The songs are entitled "You Belong to Me" (a Dean Martin/Jo Stafford cover), "Useless Talent #32", and "Two Against the World". While Grindhouse made a lackluster US$25.5 million in its theatrical release, it was the subject of much media coverage and critical acclaim from critics; James Berardinelli found McGowan to be the "standout here" and Mick LaSalle considered the film as "the best showcase of her career so far".

Her next film release, Fifty Dead Men Walking (2008), revolved around Martin McGartland, a British agent who went undercover into the Provisional Irish Republican Army (IRA). McGowan played a woman in the upper ranks of the organisation who offers herself to McGartland. McGowan caused controversy in September 2008 whilst promoting the film at a 2008 Toronto International Film Festival press conference, where she stated: "I imagine, had I grown up in Belfast, I would 100% have been in the IRA. My heart just broke for the cause. Violence is not to be played out daily and provide an answer to problems, but I understand it." This prompted director Kari Skogland and the film's producers to issue a public apology, stating that McGowan's views did not reflect their own. The film found a limited audience in theaters while critical response was positive. Also in 2008, McGowan took on a recurring role as a con artist on the acclaimed drama series Nip/Tuck, and co-hosted the TCM's film-series program The Essentials alongside Robert Osborne, discussing classic Hollywood film.

=== 2010s: Independent films and professional expansion ===
In 2010, McGowan shot a cameo in the Rodriguez's feature Machete, a role ultimately cut but was included on the DVD release, and played a semi-homeless junkie in the fantasy drama Dead Awake, where she also recorded the theme song of the film. In the 2011 sword and sorcery film Conan the Barbarian, a reimagining of the 1982 film of the same name which starred Arnold Schwarzenegger, McGowan starred as an evil half-human/half-witch. Roger Ebert described her role as a "piece of work", writing: "She has white pancake makeup, blood red lips, cute little facial tattoos and wickedly sharp metal talons on her fingers". Filming occurred between March and July 2010 in Bulgaria, and Conan was released on August 19, 2011. Budgeted at US$90 million, the film received negative reviews, and only grossed US$48.8 worldwide. McGowan also appeared on a Brian Transeau track called "Superfabulous", from his album Emotional Technology, which was also featured on the final Charmed soundtrack, The Final Chapter; the song has been featured in several films, including Win a Date with Tad Hamilton! and Raising Helen. In addition to her role in the big-budgeted Conan, McGowan starred in mainly independent productions during the early 2010s, such as the psychological thriller Rosewood Lane (2011) from director Victor Salva, the made-for-television film The Pastor's Wife (2011) alongside Michael Shanks, and a film adaptation of The Tell-Tale Heart, released in 2016.

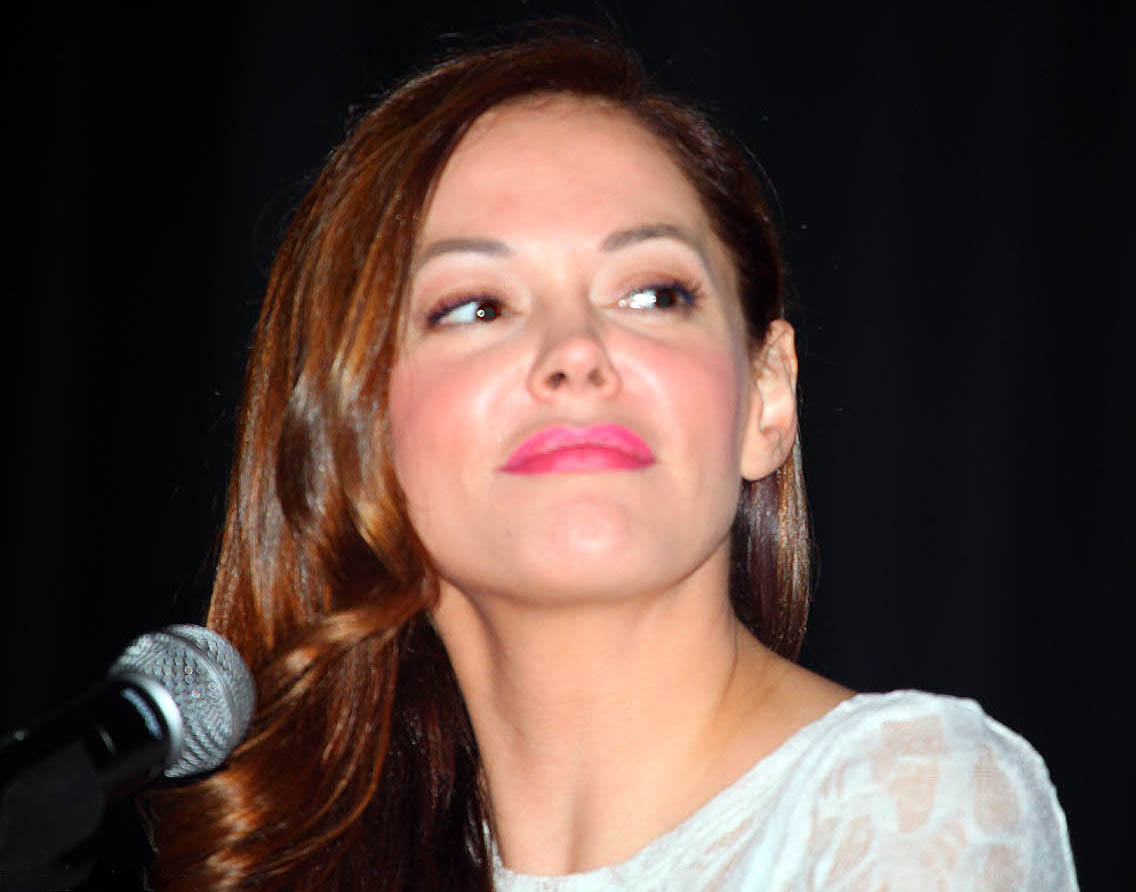
McGowan in 2011

In an August 2011 interview, McGowan talked about her experience working on the film Rosewood Lane with director Salva, who is a convicted child molester and child pornographer, stating, "I still don't really understand the whole story or history there, and I'd rather not, because it's not really my business. But he's an incredibly sweet and gentle man." McGowan lent her voice to the video games Darkwatch, playing a femme fatale named Tala, and Terminator Salvation, as a troubled soldier named Angie Salter. She guest-starred in an episode of Law & Order: Special Victims Unit as a grifter who targets New York sex clubs, and also in two episodes of Once Upon a Time between 2012 and 2014, playing the role of the young Cora Mills. She wrote and recorded a song titled "Protection", which was featured in her film Strange Hearts (2011). In the third season of Chosen (2014), a television series airing via Crackle, McGowan took on the role of an experienced hunter.

McGowan made her directorial debut with the short film Dawn, about a teen from a strict family who falls under the spell of a gas-station employee. The 17-minute film premiered at the 2014 Sundance Film Festival to critical acclaim; Way Too Indie noted: "This was a real gem of a short film. Dawn's salient literary and cultural references, paired with the film's high production value, gorgeous shots, its slow-burner buildup and gripping conclusion, bring something to the table for everyone, and portends an excellent directorial career for Ms. McGowan". In 2015, she appeared in the music video for "Break the Rules" by Charli XCX. In September 2015, McGowan released her debut single, "RM486". The song has strong feminist themes, with its title playing on the name of the abortion drug RU486 and McGowan's initials.

The independent Canadian horror film The Sound, released in 2017, starred McGowan as a best-selling author and paranormal investigator alongside Christopher Lloyd and Michael Eklund. A review in The Hollywood Reporter wrote of her role: "Despite her sympathetic situation, [it] isn't a particularly interesting character. A dismissive attitude and superior self-regard don't improve her likability either. McGowan seems comfortable with the role, however [...]". On January 30, 2018, McGowan released a memoir, Brave, in which she details her childhood and her account of the assault by Harvey Weinstein and its aftermath. McGowan appeared in the art film Indecision IV, which combines dance and gender issues. "Shot in one continuous take, the film [...] was created in May 2018, during a watershed moment in McGowan's life and is a physical expression of her state of mind at that time," a press statement stated. The piece was commissioned by UK's Heist Gallery, and was shown in 2018 at special screenings at the Institute of Light in East London on December 15 and 16, with proceeds going to the charity Refuge.

=== 2020s: Current work ===
McGowan expressed interest in recording an album of her own. During an interview with Living TV, she said, "I was actually thinking of going back and doing more soulful tunes and older tunes ... and I would love to, when I have a little bit more time." On April 21, 2020, she announced that her debut studio album Planet 9, originally released in 2018, would be reissued on April 24. The announcement on social media included a statement: "I'm not trying to be a pop star, but I did make music that heals in a new way."

== In the media ==
=== Activism and image ===
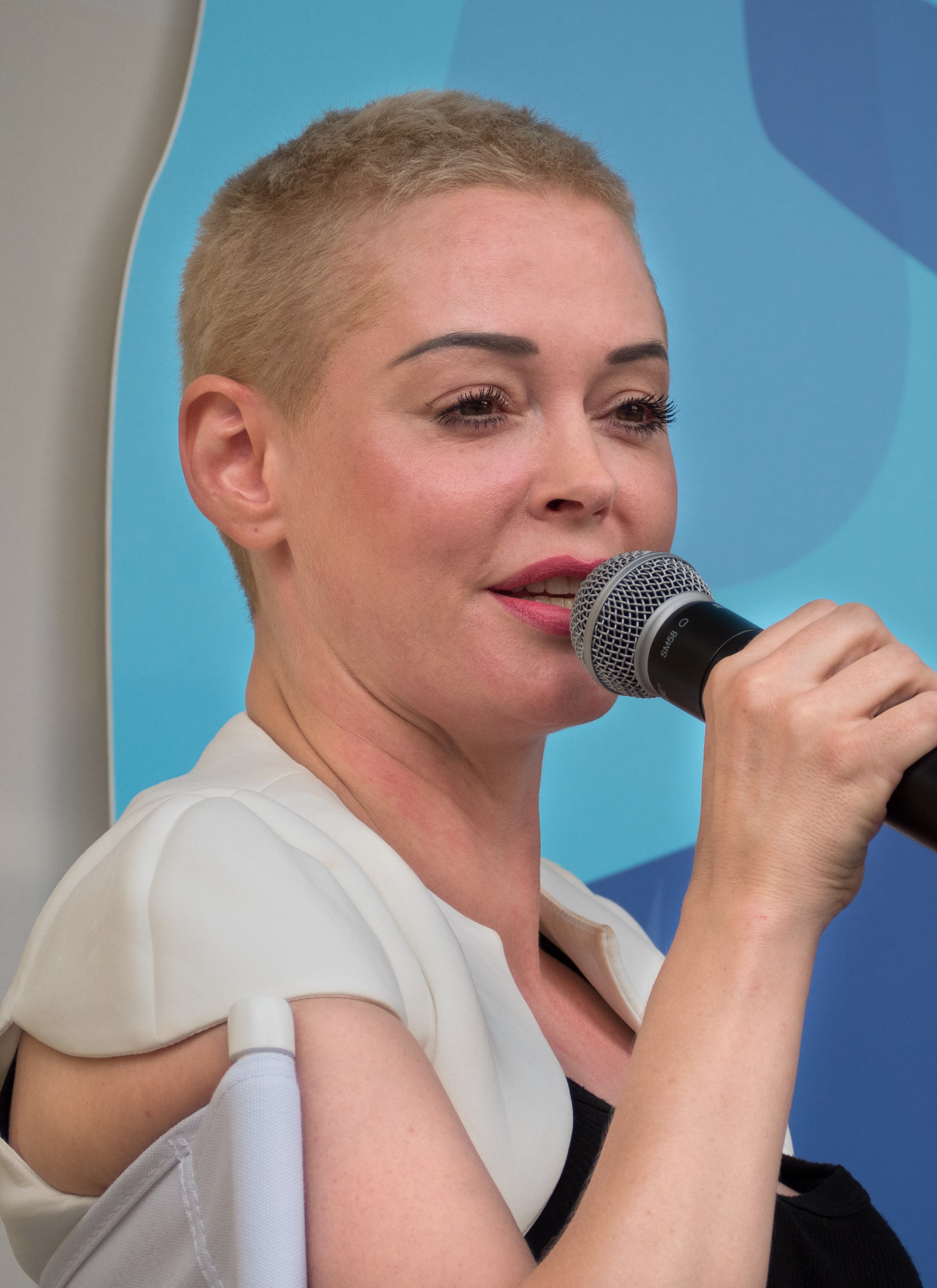
McGowan in 2018

McGowan is an activist for gay rights and campaigned against California's Proposition 8, which sought to ban same-sex marriage in the state in 2008. She is also known as an activist for Boston Terriers. She had two, named Bug and Fester, and has personally donated to various Boston Terrier rescues. McGowan reportedly encouraged friends to donate to Boston Terrier Rescue Net, and according to BTRN: "Having fallen in love with Bug and Fester, her friends donated generously. It amounted to a considerable contribution, which will go a long way in helping BTRN and the needy volunteers who selflessly give to deserving Bostons." McGowan then owned a Boston Terrier she renamed Happy, and a mini-Pomeranian she renamed Sasquatch. In 2021, she had a total of five dogs; four rescue dogs and an emotional support animal named Pearl.

In late 2009, McGowan was among several celebrities who participated in the protest NOH8. In 2017, Time recognized McGowan as one of the Silence Breakers, the magazine's Person of the Year, for speaking out about sexual assault and harassment, specifically in regards to the Harvey Weinstein sexual abuse cases and the MeToo movement. On January 31, 2018, Citizen Rose, a four-part documentary series produced by Bunim/Murray Productions following McGowan and her role in the MeToo movement premiered. In August 2018, McGowan was announced to receive the Inspiration Award at the GQ Men of the Year Awards.

=== Views and controversies ===
In May 2014, McGowan held a defiant party in support of the Brunei-owned Beverly Hills Hotel, despite a boycott over Brunei's anti-gay laws, which prescribes death by stoning for same-sex activities. McGowan explained her stance on the issue thus: "Boycotts only work when they hurt the target's bottom line. We are never going to affect the sultan's bottom line. He's worth $20 billion! This is a vanity project for him. It could sit empty for 100 years and he wouldn't even notice. But meanwhile, we're hurting all the wonderful, struggling people who work in the hotel. I'd like him to see that gays are real people. I think that's the only thing that would change his mind, not a boycott."

In November 2014, while discussing misogyny and sexism on Bret Easton Ellis' podcast, McGowan criticized the gay community for not doing more to help the cause of women's rights, saying, "I see now, basically, people who've fought for the right to stand on top of a float wearing an orange speedo and take molly. And, I see no help, and I see no paying it forward, and I have a huge problem with that. There are so many things to help and do, and I see no extending of a hand outside of the gay community to another community. And that's a problem for me." McGowan also stated, "Gays are as misogynistic as straight men, if not more so. I have an indictment of the gay community right now. I'm actually really upset with them." The characterization of LGBT rights activism being centered on drug use and wearing revealing clothing in public was criticized as homophobic. She later apologized for generalizing gay men as misogynistic, but defended the rest of her comments. She explained that "I do expect more from a group of people that understands discrimination. … What I want is for gay rights activists to help other disenfranchised groups. These activists are experts while so many other groups flounder. It's time to share the wealth and knowledge".

In 2015, McGowan criticized Caitlyn Jenner for stating that "the hardest part about being a woman is figuring out what to wear", after Jenner had been named "Woman of the Year" by Glamour. McGowan stated, "We are more than deciding what to wear. We are more than the stereotypes foisted upon us by people like you. You're a woman now? Well fucking learn that we have had a VERY different experience than your life of male privilege." In response to accusations of transphobia, McGowan stated, "Let me take this moment to point out that I am not, nor will I ever be, transphobic. The idea is laughable. Disliking something a trans person has said is no different than disliking something a man has said or that a woman has said. Being trans doesn't make one immune from criticism." In November 2015, McGowan attracted media attention after shaving her head in a transformation documented on social media. The shave was performed by hairstylist Adrian Arredondo, after which McGowan shaved Arredondo's head as well.

In early January 2020, McGowan apologized to Iran in a tweet sent out in the hours after a US airstrike in Iraq killed Iranian Major General Qasem Soleimani. She wrote, "Dear #Iran, The USA has disrespected your country, your flag, your people. 52% of us humbly apologize. We want peace with your nation. We are being held hostage by a terrorist regime. We do not know how to escape. Please do not kill us. #Soleimani" McGowan's tweet mistakenly included a GIF of the Iranian flag from the pre-revolutionary Pahlavi era.

McGowan has expressed support for Tara Reade, who accused Joe Biden of sexual assault and criticized Hollywood stars for supporting Biden. In August 2020, McGowan criticized the Democratic Party for failing to "create change and provide support for citizens facing racial inequality, economic issues and police brutality". In April 2021, McGowan accused Twitter of censorship after her account was suspended for violating Twitter's non-consensual nudity policy after she tweeted an Alison Jackson art piece showing Bill Clinton being massaged by an unknown woman.

In an April 2021 interview on Fox News Primetime, McGowan accused the Democratic Party of being a "deep cult" whose leaders do not care about supporters and who hypocritically advance the status quo despite claims to support progressivism.

In September 2021, McGowan endorsed Larry Elder in the California recall election.

== Personal life ==
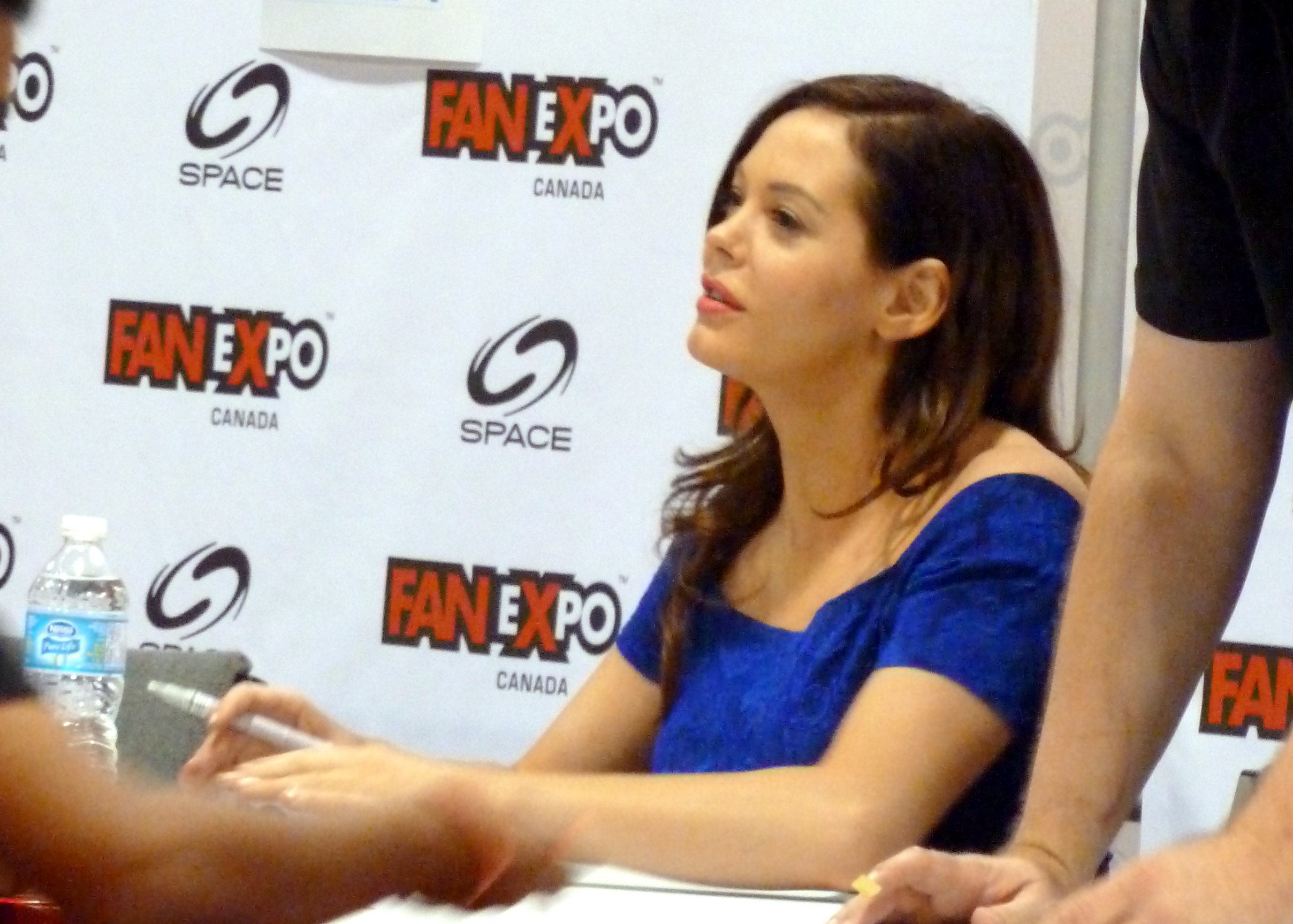
McGowan signing autographs at Fan Expo Canada in 2012

In the early 1990s, McGowan, then relatively unknown, was involved for two years with a man she refers to as William, who, she claims, kept buying her exercise equipment and fashion magazines in an effort to persuade her to get thinner. She developed an eating disorder in her unsuccessful efforts to get her weight down to 84 pounds (38 kg) like the women in the magazines. "I never was able to get below 92 pounds (42 kg)," she wrote later. "I felt like a failure." That relationship and the eating disorder ended in early 1993 when McGowan met Brett Cantor, a part-owner of Hollywood's Dragonfly nightclub. Cantor was stabbed to death in his house that July, and McGowan stated that his murder left her "shattered". The killing remains unsolved.

McGowan had a three-and-a-half-year relationship with rock musician Marilyn Manson. After a formal engagement lasting two years, McGowan ended the relationship in 2001 over "lifestyle differences". In 2007, before the release of Grindhouse, there was speculation that McGowan was dating Robert Rodriguez, the film's director. In May 2007, it was reported that they confirmed their relationship while appearing hand-in-hand at the Cannes Film Festival. On October 12, 2007, it was announced by Zap2it that McGowan was engaged to Rodriguez. They reportedly split in October 2009. In July 2013, after one year of dating, McGowan became engaged to Davey Detail, an artist. They married on October 12, 2013, in Los Angeles. In February 2016, she filed for divorce from Detail, citing irreconcilable differences. The divorce was finalized later that year, in November.

In January 2019, McGowan pleaded no contest to a misdemeanor drug charge in Virginia involving cocaine that was found in a wallet she left behind at Dulles International Airport in 2017. She paid a US$2,500 fine and was given a suspended jail sentence. McGowan moved from New York to Mexico in early 2020 and in February 2021 became a permanent resident of Mexico, living in Tulum, Quintana Roo. McGowan has stated that she has no plans to move back to the United States.

=== Harvey Weinstein sexual abuse allegations ===
In October 2017, The New York Times reported that McGowan received a $100,000 settlement from film mogul Harvey Weinstein in relation to an alleged sexual assault in 1997. It was alleged that the encounter had taken place in a hotel room during the Sundance Film Festival.

On October 10, 2017, McGowan accused actor Ben Affleck of lying for saying he was "angry" over Weinstein's alleged abuse of women, but failing to indicate whether he knew about it, even though she had told him Weinstein had acted inappropriately towards her. Via Twitter, she also attacked other men in the film industry, tweeting, "All of you Hollywood 'A-list' golden boys are LIARS....You all knew." She later clarified that she told Affleck, while crying, that she had "just come from Harvey's and he said, 'Goddamn it, I told him to stop doing that.' It's not like I'm raging at Ben Affleck. I never said to him, 'I was just raped.' It's just more to illustrate the point of this continual thing of everybody knowing and everybody being part of it, unwittingly or proactively."

On October 12, 2017, McGowan alleged that Harvey Weinstein had raped her, and that Amazon Studios dropped her project after she reported it. Later the same day, McGowan said that Twitter suspended her account for 12 hours after she repeatedly tweeted about Weinstein's sexual misconduct towards her. Twitter explained that McGowan's account had violated its privacy policy because one of her tweets included a private phone number. The New York Times reported, "Many Twitter users expressed outrage over Ms. McGowan's account being locked." After the tweet was removed, her account was unlocked several hours before the 12-hour ban was set to expire. Through his lawyer, David Boies, Weinstein at one point hired the private intelligence agency Black Cube to spy on McGowan and to stop outlets such as The New York Times and The New Yorker from reporting their investigations on Harvey Weinstein. On February 7, 2018, Jill Messick, McGowan's manager at the time of the alleged rape in 1997, died by suicide. Messick's family blamed Weinstein, the media, the public, and McGowan for her death.

In 2021, McGowan claimed that Jennifer Siebel Newsom, wife of California governor Gavin Newsom, attempted to bribe her in order to silence her allegations on Weinstein. A spokesperson for Siebel Newsom called McGowan's claims a "complete fabrication".

In December 2021, a federal judge dismissed a racketeering lawsuit McGowan filed against Weinstein, lawyers David Boies and Lisa Bloom, and Black Cube in October 2019 after she failed to file documents by a December deadline, which occurred after she dismissed her attorneys in November 2021 and began representing herself in the suit.

McGowan's story briefly appears in the 2022 film dramatization of The New York Times' investigations of these cases, She Said. She is portrayed by Kelly McQuail, only in voice.

=== Allegation of statutory rape against Alexander Payne ===
In a 2018 interview with Ronan Farrow, McGowan accused a "prominent" man in Hollywood of statutory rape; she did not name the person in question. In August 2020, McGowan announced the man was filmmaker Alexander Payne, claiming that he had sex with her in California when she was 15 years old. Payne responded to McGowan's allegation by writing a guest column in Deadline Hollywood; he acknowledged a consensual relationship stating that they had met at some point in 1991 (McGowan turned 18 in September 1991) at an audition for a comic short film that he was directing for the Playboy Channel and had no reason to believe she was under the age of consent as the part required an actress who was of age. Payne ended his statement writing, "While I cannot allow false statements about events twenty-nine years ago to go uncorrected, I will continue to wish only the best for Rose".

In 2020, McGowan alleged that, in 1937, Hal Roach was responsible for large-scale sexual abuse of actresses. This is in relation to one of Hollywood's earliest rape cases, reported by dancer and extra Patricia Douglas. The documentary Girl 27 covers the case and the resulting efforts to silence the legal action, as well as other sexual abuses in Hollywood. McGowan and other famous activists, including Jessica Chastain, have supported the film, which spread the word to the public about the American film entertainment industry's rape culture problem.

== Filmography ==
=== Film ===
Year	Title	Role	Notes
1990	Class of 1999	Girl Outside Office	Uncredited
1992	Encino Man	Nora	
1995	The Doom Generation	Amy Blue	
1996	Seed	Miriam	Short film
1996	Bio-Dome	Denise	
1996	Scream	Tatum Riley	
1997	Going All the Way	Gale Ann Thayer	
1997	Kiss & Tell	Jasmine Hoyle	
1997	Nowhere	Valley Chick #3	
1997	Lewis and Clark and George	George	
1998	Southie	Kathy Quinn	
1998	Phantoms	Lisa Pailey	
1998	Devil in the Flesh	Debbie Strand	Direct-to-video
1999	Jawbreaker	Courtney Shayne	
1999	Sleeping Beauties	Sno Blo	Short film
2000	Ready to Rumble	Sasha	
2000	The Last Stop	Nancy	
2001	Monkeybone	Miss Kitty	
2002	Strange Hearts	Moira Kennedy	
2003	Stealing Bess	Debbie Dinsdale	
2006	The Black Dahlia	Sheryl Saddon	
2007	Grindhouse – Planet Terror	Cherry Darling	
2007	Grindhouse – Death Proof	Pam	
2008	Fifty Dead Men Walking	Grace Sterrin	
2010	Machete	Boots McCoy	Deleted scenes
2010	Dead Awake	Charlie Scheel	
2011	Conan the Barbarian	Marique	
2011	Rosewood Lane	Sonny Blake	
2011	Still Screaming: The Ultimate Scary Movie Retrospective	Herself	Documentary
2014	The Tell-Tale Heart	Ariel	
2015	The Weight of Blood and Bones	Madeline	Short film
2016	The Caged Pillows	Monday	Voice; short film
2016	Heresy	Heresy	Short film
2017	The Sound	Kelly Johansen	
2018	Indecision IV	Dancing woman	Short film
2018	This Changes Everything	Herself	Documentary
2019	Me Too: The Movement	Herself	Documentary
2019	Rose McGowan: Being Brave	Herself	Documentary
2022	When We Speak	Herself	Documentary
2022	Body Parts	Herself	Documentary

=== Television ===
Year	Title	Role	Notes
1990	True Colors	Suzanne	Episode: "Life with Fathers"
2001	What About Joan?	Maeve McCrimmen	Episode: "Maeve"
2001	The Killing Yard	Linda Borus	Television film
2001–2006	Charmed	Paige Matthews	Main role (seasons 4-8); 112 episodes
2003	Intimate Portrait	Herself	Docuseries; 2 episodes
2003	Punk'd	Herself	Episode: "Travis Barker, Jaime Pressly, Red Carpet Interviews"
2005	Elvis	Ann-Margret	Miniseries
2008	The Essentials	Herself	Host; 1 series
2008	Dogs 101	Herself	1 episode
2009	Nip/Tuck	Dr. Theodora "Teddy" Rowe	Recurring role (season 6); 5 episodes
2010	Women in Chains	Petra	1 episode
2011	Law & Order: Special Victims Unit	Cassandra Davina	Episode: "Bombshell"
2011	The Pastor's Wife	Mary Winkler	Television film
2011	Scream: The Inside Story	Herself	Documentary
2012	RuPaul's Drag Race	Herself	Guest judge; episode: "The Fabulous Bitch Ball"
2013	Chosen	Josie Acosta	Main role (season 1); 6 episodes
2013–2014	Once Upon a Time	Young Cora Mills	2 episodes
2016	Ultimate Spider-Man	Medusa	Voice; episode: "Agent Web"
2018	Citizen Rose	Herself	Docuseries
2018	The View	Herself	Guest co-host; 2 episodes
2019	Chopped	Herself	Guest judge; episode: "Horror Flick Halloween"
2020	Question Time	Herself	1 episode
2023	Storyville	Herself	1 episode

=== Video games ===
Year	Title	Role	Notes
2005	Darkwatch	Tala	
2009	Terminator Salvation	Angie Salter	
2015	Call of Duty: Advanced Warfare	Lilith	

=== Web series ===
Year	Title	Role	Notes
2013	Doctor Lollipop	Dr. Coco / Red Riding Hood	

=== Music videos ===
Year	Title	Role	Artist	Notes
1999	"Yoo Hoo"	Courtney Shayne	Imperial Teen	Cameo
1999	"Coma White"	Jacqueline Kennedy	Marilyn Manson	
2012	"Glamazon"	Herself	RuPaul	Cameo
2014	"Break the Rules"	Chaperone	Charli XCX	Cameo
2015	"RM486"	Herself	Rose McGowan	Debut single
2017	"Fire in Cairo"	Herself	Luna	

=== As director ===
Year	Title	Notes
2014	Dawn	Short film
2017	Ruth	Short film

== Discography ==
=== Albums ===
List of albums
Title	Album details
Planet 9	Released: April 24, 2020; Label: Damage Inc; Formats: Digital download

=== As lead artist ===
List of singles as lead artist, showing year released and album name
Title	Year	Album
"RM486"	2015	Non-album single

=== Guest appearances ===
List of guest appearances, with other performing artists, showing year released and album name
Title	Year	Other performer(s)	Album
"Posthuman"	1998	Marilyn Manson	Mechanical Animals

=== Soundtrack appearances ===
List of soundtrack appearances
Title	Year	Other artist(s)	Album
"You Belong To Me"	2007	—N/a	Planet Terror
"Useless Talent #32"	2007	—N/a	Planet Terror
"Two Against the World"	2007	—N/a	Planet Terror

== Bibliography ==
- Brave (Memoir; HarperOne, 2018)

== Awards and recognition ==
List of awards and nominations received by Rose McGowan
Year	Film/Title	Award	Category	Result
1995	The Doom Generation	Independent Spirit Awards	Best Debut Performance	Nominated
1999	Jawbreaker	MTV Movie Awards	Best Villain	Nominated
2002	Charmed	Wand Awards	Best New Cast Member	Nominated
2005	Charmed	Family Television Awards	Favorite Sister	Won
2006	—N/a	Blender	Sexiest Women of TV and Film	Won
2007	Grindhouse – Planet Terror	Scream Awards	Scream Queen	Nominated
2007	Grindhouse – Planet Terror	Fright Meter Awards	Best Supporting Actress	Nominated
2007	Grindhouse – Planet Terror	Golden Schmoes Awards	Best T&A of the Year	Nominated
2008	Grindhouse – Planet Terror	Saturn Awards	Best Supporting Actress	Nominated
2008	—N/a	San Francisco International Film Festival	Midnight Outstanding Achievement Award	Won
2014	Dawn	Sundance Film Festival	Short Film Grand Jury Prize	Nominated
2018	—N/a	Alliance of Women Film Journalists Awards	Outstanding Achievement by a Woman in the Film Industry	Won
2018	—N/a	GQ Men of the Year Awards	Inspiration Award	Won
