= 1999 MTV Movie Awards =

American awards show

- Date: Saturday, June 5, 1999
- Location: Barker Hangar, Santa Monica, California
- Country: United States
- Hosted by: Lisa Kudrow

Television/radio coverage
- Network: MTV

The 1999 MTV Movie Awards were hosted by Lisa Kudrow. Musical performances included Kid Rock, Robbie Williams, and Will Smith with Dru Hill, Nine Inch Nails and Kool Moe Dee. The winners were announced on Saturday, June 5, 1999 at the Barker Hangar in Santa Monica, California, airing on MTV.

== Performers ==
- Will Smith — "Wild Wild West"
- Kid Rock — "Bawitdaba"
- Robbie Williams — "Millennium"

== Presenters ==
- Courtney Love and James Van Der Beek — presented Best On-Screen Duo
- Whitney Houston — introduced Will Smith
- Tobey Maguire and Heather Graham — presented Breakthrough Female
- Hugh Grant and Salma Hayek — presented Best Comedic Performance
- Dylan McDermott and Kate Hudson — presented Breakthrough Male
- Jay-Z and Rebecca Romijn — presented Best Action Sequence
- Catherine Zeta-Jones and Ricky Martin — presented Best Kiss
- Omar Epps and Taye Diggs — introduced Kid Rock
- Samuel L. Jackson and Jake Lloyd — presented Best Villain
- Keri Russell and Brendan Fraser — presented Best Female Performance
- Rose McGowan and Jon Stewart — presented Best Fight
- Ben Affleck and Kevin Smith — presented Best New Filmmaker
- Lisa Kudrow — presented Best Dramatic Pause
- Shawn Hatosy and Rachael Leigh Cook — introduced Robbie Williams
- Janeane Garofalo and Mike Myers — presented Best Male Performance
- Keanu Reeves and Jennifer Lopez — presented Best Movie

== Awards ==
Winners are listed at the top of each list in bold.

=== Best Movie ===
There's Something About Mary

- Armageddon
- Saving Private Ryan
- Shakespeare in Love
- The Truman Show

=== Best Male Performance ===
Jim Carrey – The Truman Show

- Ben Affleck – Armageddon
- Tom Hanks – Saving Private Ryan
- Adam Sandler – The Waterboy
- Will Smith – Enemy of the State

=== Best Female Performance ===
Cameron Diaz – There's Something About Mary

- Jennifer Love Hewitt – Can't Hardly Wait
- Jennifer Lopez – Out of Sight
- Gwyneth Paltrow – Shakespeare in Love
- Liv Tyler – Armageddon

=== Breakthrough Male ===
James Van Der Beek – Varsity Blues

- Ray Allen – He Got Game
- Joseph Fiennes – Shakespeare in Love
- Josh Hartnett – Halloween H20: 20 Years Later
- Chris Rock – Lethal Weapon 4

=== Breakthrough Female ===
Katie Holmes – Disturbing Behavior

- Cate Blanchett – Elizabeth
- Brandy – I Still Know What You Did Last Summer
- Rachael Leigh Cook – She's All That
- Catherine Zeta-Jones – The Mask of Zorro

=== Best On-Screen Duo ===
Jackie Chan and Chris Tucker – Rush Hour

- Ben Affleck and Liv Tyler – Armageddon
- Nicolas Cage and Meg Ryan – City of Angels
- Freddie Prinze Jr. and Rachael Leigh Cook – She's All That
- Ben Stiller and Cameron Diaz – There's Something About Mary

=== Best Villain ===
Matt Dillon – There's Something About Mary / Stephen Dorff – Blade (tie)

- Chucky – Bride of Chucky
- Jet Li – Lethal Weapon 4
- Rose McGowan – Jawbreaker

=== Best Comedic Performance ===
Adam Sandler – The Waterboy

- Cameron Diaz – There's Something About Mary
- Chris Rock – Lethal Weapon 4
- Ben Stiller – There's Something About Mary
- Chris Tucker – Rush Hour

=== Best Song From a Movie ===
Aerosmith — "I Don't Want to Miss a Thing" (from Armageddon)

- Aaliyah — "Are You That Somebody?" (from Dr. Dolittle)
- Goo Goo Dolls — "Iris" (from City of Angels)
- Green Day — "Nice Guys Finish Last" (from Varsity Blues)
- Jay-Z — "Can I Get A..." (from Rush Hour)

=== Best Kiss ===
Gwyneth Paltrow and Joseph Fiennes – Shakespeare in Love

- George Clooney and Jennifer Lopez – Out of Sight
- Matt Dillon, Denise Richards and Neve Campbell – Wild Things
- Jeremy Irons and Dominique Swain – Lolita
- Ben Stiller and Cameron Diaz – There's Something About Mary

=== Best Action Sequence ===
Asteroid Destroys New York City – Armageddon

- Gibson/Glover Car Chase on Freeway and Through Building – Lethal Weapon 4
- Car Chase in France with De Niro Pursuing Natasha McElhone – Ronin
- Tom Hanks and Company Land on Normandy Beach – Saving Private Ryan

=== Best Fight ===
Ben Stiller vs. Puffy the Dog (created by Industrial Light & Magic) – There's Something About Mary

- Wesley Snipes vs. Vampires – Blade
- Antonio Banderas vs. Catherine Zeta-Jones – The Mask of Zorro
- Jackie Chan and Chris Tucker vs. Chinese Gang – Rush Hour

=== Best New Filmmaker ===
- **Guy Ritchie – Lock, Stock and Two Smoking Barrels**
