= Citizen Rose =

- Genre: Documentary
- Starring: Rose McGowan
- Country of origin: United States
- Original language: English
- No. of seasons: 1
- No. of episodes: 4

Production
- Executive producers: Andrea Metz; Farnaz Farjam Chazan; Gil Goldschein; Jonathan Murray; Rose McGowan; Autumn Jackson-Singh; Narinder Singh
- Running time: 360 minutes
- Production company: Bunim/Murray Productions

Original release
- Network: E!
- Release: January 30 – May 31, 2018

Citizen Rose is a four-part American documentary television series following actress Rose McGowan, her experiences with assault in the film industry, her connection to the Harvey Weinstein sexual abuse allegations of 2017, and her role in the resulting Me Too movement. The first episode premiered on January 30, 2018, and the remaining episodes began airing in May 2018. The series premiered the same week as her memoir Brave was released. The series aired on the E! Network in the United States. It was produced by Bunim/Murray Productions.

== Episodes ==
Viewership and ratings per episode of Citizen Rose
No.	Title	Air date	Rating/share (18–49)	Viewers (millions)
1	"Citizen Rose"	January 30, 2018	0.07	0.188
2	"Brave"	May 17, 2018	0.06	0.139
3	"Trauma"	May 24, 2018	0.05	0.112
4	"Cult"	May 31, 2018	0.03	0.082
