= Brave (McGowan book) =

Memoir by Rose McGowan

- Author: Rose McGowan
- Language: English
- Genre: Memoir
- Published: January 2018
- Publisher: HarperOne
- Publication place: US
- Media type: Print, Ebook, Audiobook
- Pages: xiv, 251 pages
- ISBN: 978-0-06-265598-1 (Hardcover)
- OCLC: 1024114102
- Dewey Decimal: 791.4302/8092 B
- LC Class: PN2287.M54565 A3 2018

Brave is a memoir written by actress and activist Rose McGowan released on January 30, 2018. The book details McGowan’s childhood living as part of the controversial group Children of God and her sexual assault by Harvey Weinstein. The book was released during the same week as McGowan's documentary series Citizen Rose.
