= MTV Movie & TV Award for Best Performance in a TV Show =

This is a following list of the MTV Movie & TV Award winners and nominees for Best Performance in a Show. The category debuted in 2017 when the ceremony began jointly celebrating cinema and television under the name Best Actor in a Show.

== Winners and nominees ==
=== 2010s ===
Year	Nominee	Character	Show	Ref
2017	Millie Bobby Brown	Eleven	Stranger Things	
2017	Emilia Clarke	Daenerys Targaryen	Game of Thrones	
2017	Donald Glover	Earnest "Earn" Marks	Atlanta	
2017	Jeffrey Dean Morgan	Negan	The Walking Dead	
2017	Mandy Moore	Rebecca Pearson	This Is Us	
2017	Gina Rodriguez	Jane Gloriana Villanueva	Jane the Virgin	
2018	Millie Bobby Brown	Eleven	Stranger Things	
2018	Darren Criss	Andrew Cunanan	The Assassination of Gianni Versace	
2018	Katherine Langford	Hannah Baker	13 Reasons Why	
2018	Issa Rae	Issa Dee	Insecure	
2018	Maisie Williams	Arya Stark	Game of Thrones	
