= Mileven =

Romantic Stranger Things fan pairing

Mileven is the romantic relationship between Mike Wheeler and Eleven, two fictional characters from the Netflix science fiction–horror television series Stranger Things. The term is a portmanteau commonly used by fans and media to describe their relationship. Introduced in the first season of the series, Mileven develops from a close friendship into a central romantic storyline and serves as one of the show’s primary emotional arcs. Set against the backdrop of supernatural events in 1980s Hawkins, Indiana, the relationship is portrayed as a formative first love, marked by loyalty, emotional intimacy, separation, and reunion.

== Fictional history ==
=== Season 1 ===
Mike Wheeler meets Eleven after she escapes from a secret government laboratory and is discovered by Mike and his friends while searching for their missing friend Will Byers. Mike shelters Eleven at his home and gives her the nickname "El" after seeing her "011" tattoo. As Eleven assists the group using her telekinetic abilities, she and Mike develop a close emotional bond marked by mutual trust and compassion.

Mike defends Eleven socially and emotionally, including at school, and promises her a future where she can live safely with his family. Their relationship turns romantic when Mike kisses Eleven while hiding at Hawkins Middle School. Eleven later sacrifices herself to defeat the Demogorgon and save the group, disappearing into the Upside Down.

=== Season 2 ===
Mike remains deeply affected by Eleven's disappearance and attempts to contact her nightly using his radio. Unbeknownst to him, Eleven is alive and living in isolation under Jim Hopper's protection, forbidden from contacting Mike for safety reasons.

Eleven secretly visits Mike at school but leaves after seeing him with Max Mayfield, misinterpreting the situation. They reunite later when Eleven returns to Hawkins and rescues the group during a demodog attack at the Byers' home. After sealing the gate to the Upside Down, Mike and Eleven attend the Snow Ball together, where they slow dance and kiss, confirming their relationship.

=== Season 3 ===
Mike and Eleven are shown to have been dating regularly for several months. Hopper’s interference leads Mike to lie to Eleven, causing a temporary breakup encouraged by Max. Despite ongoing tension, Mike expresses that Eleven is the most important person in his life and risks himself to protect her during encounters with the Mind Flayer.

During a heated argument in Hopper's cabin, Mike blurts out that he loves Eleven while defending her and insisting the group can't risk losing her again (though he doesn't directly say it to her face, and she overhears it). After the Mind Flayer is defeated at Starcourt Mall, they reconcile. Following Hopper’s presumed death, Eleven moves away with the Byers family. Before leaving Hawkins, Eleven tells Mike that she heard his earlier confession, reciprocates his feelings by saying "I love you too," and the two share a goodbye kiss.

=== Season 4 ===
Mike and Eleven maintain a long-distance relationship through letters, though communication problems emerge as Mike struggles to say "I love you" directly. When Mike visits Eleven in California, their reunion is affectionate but strained by Eleven hiding the bullying she faces at school.

After Eleven assaults her bully, she is taken into custody and later recruited by Dr. Sam Owens to regain her powers. Mike travels across the country with Will Byers, Jonathan Byers, and Argyle to find her. They reunite in Nevada after Eleven regains her abilities.

During Eleven’s psychic confrontation with Vecna, Mike delivers an emotional confession, stating that he has always loved her and explaining his fear of expressing it aloud. His encouragement enables Eleven to fight back. Afterward, Mike remains by her side as she grieves Max Mayfield’s critical condition.

=== Season 5 ===
Following the escalation of military pursuit, Eleven is forced into hiding, limiting her time with Mike and the rest of the group. When they reunite, Mike expresses his hope that after defeating Vecna, they can leave Hawkins together and live peacefully elsewhere.

As the final conflict unfolds, Kali / Eight convinces Eleven that defeating Vecna may require their own deaths to end the cycle of violence connected to the Upside Down. She conceals this from Mike, leading to their separation during the battle. When Mike realizes Eleven intends to sacrifice herself, he attempts to stop her, begging her to stay. Eleven tells Mike she loves him and asks him to help the others understand her decision, and they share a final kiss before she removes him from her psychic void and disappears along with the Upside Down as it is destroyed.

18 months later, Mike continues to struggle with the loss of Eleven. During a game of Dungeons & Dragons with the group, he proposes the possibility that the Eleven they witnessed dying was an illusion generated by Kali while the real Eleven escaped. Though Mike admits that there is no way to prove it, he and the others choose to believe that Eleven survived and is enjoying her life somewhere beyond Hawkins.

== Development ==
The actors and creators have often commented on Mileven. Millie Bobby Brown has spoken candidly about the relationship: during a 2019 fan Q&A, she said she "was not happy" about Mike and Eleven’s scripted breakup in Season 3, noting that the characters were "so in love" and "so cute together". Brown has also praised Mike’s devotion, calling him “the perfect boy” who loved Eleven unconditionally. Finn Wolfhard likewise enjoyed the romance subplot; by Season 3 he told Entertainment Weekly that filming Mileven scenes was easy because he and Brown had worked together for years and were comfortable on set.

Behind the camera, showrunners Matt and Ross Duffer carefully planned Mileven's arc. They filmed the first Snow Ball dance scene in Season 1 as their very last shot for that day, wanting to capture genuine emotion. By the series finale, the Duffers intentionally ended Mike and Eleven's story: Ross Duffer said that Mike "remembering all the joys […] he had as a kid" ends with him closing the basement door, symbolizing "leaving his childhood behind". In a Netflix Tudum interview, the brothers confirmed they "had been sitting with the idea" of this definitive ending "for a very long time," calling the closed door the moment "they’re leaving their childhood behind". They also explained that the final ambiguity of Eleven’s fate was deliberate: they wanted Mike and the audience to "believe in that happier ending" even if it isn’t shown explicitly.

Finn Wolfhard and Millie Bobby Brown's natural chemistry was evident during auditions, influencing the romantic direction. Brown has discussed Eleven's arc as one of self-discovery, with Mike serving as her first real emotional anchor, though later seasons explore her independence. The Duffer Brothers adjusted the relationship's progression based on the actors' growth, incorporating real-life adolescence into themes of communication and idealization. In Season 5, the strained dynamic was intentional to highlight how their bond, forged in crisis, falters in peace, contrasting with other pairings like Mike's deepening friendship with Will. The finale's ambiguity was designed to evoke belief over certainty, with Matt Duffer stating, "If Eleven is out there, the most that they could hope for is a belief that it’s true because they can’t be in contact with her."

== Reception ==
=== Critical response ===
Critics have frequently highlighted the chemistry between Mike and Eleven as a strength of the series. In a 2019 recap of Season 3, The New York Times described their interactions as emblematic of the show's blend of romance and weirdness, noting how their teenage dynamics added emotional depth to the narrative. Similarly, Entertainment Weekly praised the "pure teen love story moment" in Season 3 when Mike and Eleven reconcile over M&Ms, emphasizing the authenticity of their youthful romance amid the chaos. The Guardian echoed this in its review of Season 3, pointing out how Mike and Eleven's alternating phases of kissing and breaking up captured the "frightening as hell, but far more fun" tone of the season. Screen Rant highlighted Mike's "self-sacrificing nature" toward Eleven as a key strength, ranking Mileven among the show's best couples for their strong connection from the start.

The pairing's setup from the beginning of the series has been noted as intentional and effective. Screen Rant analyzed how Stranger Things foreshadowed Mike and Eleven's romance in Season 1 through subtle interactions, such as Mike's protective instincts and Eleven's reliance on him, which laid the foundation for their bond. In a 2020 article, the outlet listed reasons why Mike and Eleven could be considered the show's best couple, citing their mutual support during crises and the emotional payoff of their reunions after separations, though it also acknowledged drawbacks like their time apart in Season 2 limiting on-screen development. Variety has covered the actors' reflections on their characters' relationship, including Wolfhard's agreement with Brown's lighthearted criticism of their on-screen kissing scenes as "lousy," which underscored the awkward realism of portraying adolescent romance.

However, the relationship has faced criticism for potential unhealthy dynamics. Screen Rant explored why Mike struggled to say "I love you" to Eleven in Season 4, attributing it to his family's loveless marriage influencing his emotional expression, which some viewed as a realistic but problematic barrier. Another piece suggested Eleven should break up with Mike post-Season 4, arguing that her identity has been overly defined by the relationship, potentially hindering her individual growth amid her trauma. Collider discussed the "hard truth" about Mike and Eleven's struggles in Season 5, Volume 1, hinting at an impending breakup due to ongoing communication issues and external pressures. MovieWeb emphasized Mike's essential role in Eleven's arc, noting how their connection provides her stability but also risks codependency.

The Hollywood Reporter's critics' roundtable on the finale expressed irritation at the ambiguity, feeling it "undid much of what was noble about Eleven's choice" to sacrifice herself, leaving viewers exhausted rather than satisfied. The Guardian commended the show's emotional operatics but noted Season 5's nostalgia as effective yet not fully resolving romantic arcs like Mileven, calling the series "amazing on a second-by-second basis" but questioning its overall cohesion. Rolling Stone appreciated the finale's poignant farewell but critiqued the epilogue's hopeful spin as overly sentimental. Forbes analyzed the twist ending as impactful for Mileven, emphasizing Mike's grief and coping through storytelling, though it divided audiences on whether Eleven's fate honored the relationship's themes.

In broader reviews, the relationship has been tied to the show's exploration of coming-of-age themes. Entertainment Weekly recapped Season 2's finale as featuring "cute" moments between Mike and Eleven at the Snow Ball, symbolizing hope after trauma. The outlet also revealed behind-the-scenes insights, such as original plans to delay their reunion until later in Season 2, which would have heightened emotional tension. Variety noted lighter romantic elements in Season 3, like their "tumultuous teenage romance," contrasting with the season's monstrous threats.

=== Fan and cultural impact ===
While direct social media discussions are often informal, media outlets have reported on the pairing's popularity and debates within the fandom. The Daily Fandom examined whether Mileven is "adorable or disastrous," highlighting fan appreciation for their soulmate-like connection but also concerns over possessiveness and isolation from the group. Collider addressed fan theories around alternative pairings, such as "Byler" (Mike and Will), noting how Season 5's resolution disappointed some but satisfied others who saw it as consistent with the show's trajectory. Yahoo covered persistent fan hopes for different outcomes post-Season 5, Episode 7, reflecting the relationship's divisive nature.

The duo's dance scene in Season 2 to "Every Breath You Take" was recognized at the 2018 MTV Movie & TV Awards, winning in the category for Best Musical Moment, underscoring its cultural resonance. Screen Rant discussed unresolved tensions heading into Season 5, including Mike and Eleven's long-distance challenges, which fueled fan speculation about breakups or reconciliations. Overall, Mileven has been credited with contributing to the series' emotional core, with Exeposé Online noting in a Season 5 review how it influenced narrative debates among viewers.
