= MTV Movie & TV Award for Best Performance in a Show =

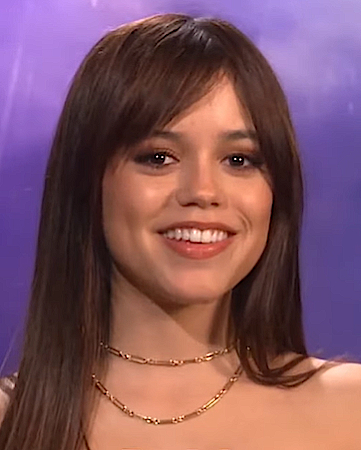
The 2023 recipient: Jenna Ortega

This is a following list of the MTV Movie & TV Award winners and nominees for Best Performance in a Show. The category debuted in 2017 when the ceremony began jointly celebrating cinema and television under the name Best Actor in a Show.

== Winners and nominees ==
=== 2010s ===
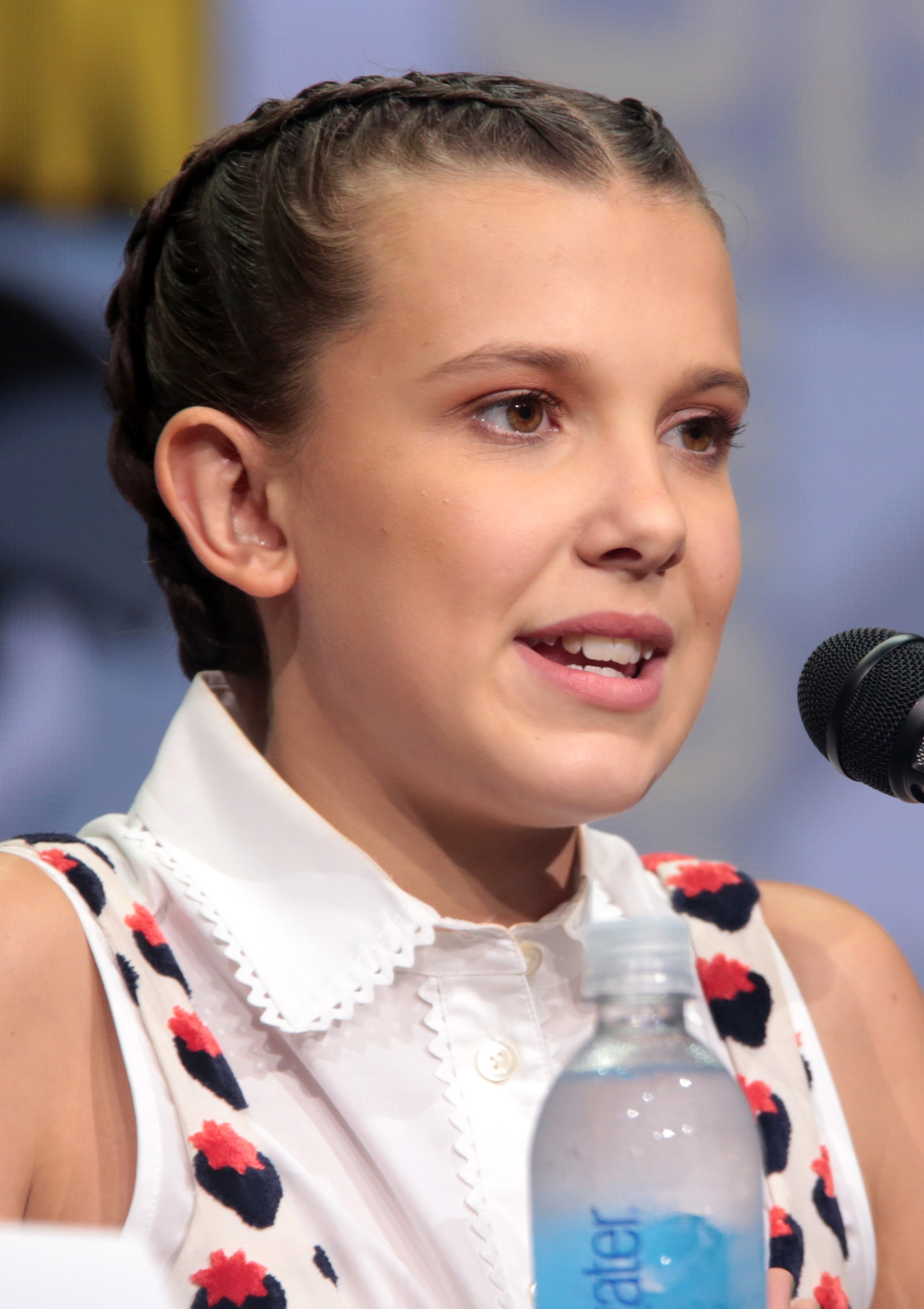
Millie Bobby Brown was the inaugural winner

Year	Nominee	Character	Show	Ref
2017	Millie Bobby Brown	Eleven	Stranger Things	
2017	Emilia Clarke	Daenerys Targaryen	Game of Thrones	
2017	Donald Glover	Earnest "Earn" Marks	Atlanta	
2017	Jeffrey Dean Morgan	Negan	The Walking Dead	
2017	Mandy Moore	Rebecca Pearson	This Is Us	
2017	Gina Rodriguez	Jane Gloriana Villanueva	Jane the Virgin	
2018	Millie Bobby Brown	Eleven	Stranger Things	
2018	Darren Criss	Andrew Cunanan	The Assassination of Gianni Versace: American Crime Story	
2018	Katherine Langford	Hannah Baker	13 Reasons Why	
2018	Issa Rae	Issa Dee	Insecure	
2018	Maisie Williams	Arya Stark	Game of Thrones	
2019	Elisabeth Moss	June Osborne / Offred	The Handmaid's Tale	
2019	Emilia Clarke	Daenerys Targaryen	Game of Thrones	
2019	Gina Rodriguez	Jane Villanueva	Jane the Virgin	
2019	Kiernan Shipka	Sabrina Spellman	Chilling Adventures of Sabrina	
2019	†~~Jason Mitchell~~	~~Brandon Johnson~~	~~The Chi~~	

=== 2020s ===
Year	Nominee	Character	Show	Ref
2021	Elizabeth Olsen	Wanda Maximoff	WandaVision	
2021	Michaela Coel	Arabella Essiedu	I May Destroy You	
2021	Emma Corrin	Diana, Princess of Wales	The Crown	
2021	Elliot Page	Vanya Hargreeves	The Umbrella Academy	
2021	Anya Taylor-Joy	Beth Harmon	The Queen's Gambit	
2022	Zendaya	Rue Bennett	Euphoria	
2022	Amanda Seyfried	Elizabeth Holmes	The Dropout	
2022	Lily James	Pamela Anderson	Pam & Tommy	
2022	Kelly Reilly	Beth Dutton	Yellowstone	
2022	Sydney Sweeney	Cassie Howard	Euphoria	
2023	Jenna Ortega	Wednesday Addams	Wednesday	
2023	Aubrey Plaza	Harper Spiller	The White Lotus	
2023	Christina Ricci	Misty Quigley	Yellowjackets	
2023	Riley Keough	Daisy Jones	Daisy Jones and the Six	
2023	Sadie Sink	Max Mayfield	Stranger Things	

== Multiple wins and nominations ==
The following individuals received multiple wins:

Winner	Actor
2	Millie Bobby Brown

The following individuals received multiple nominations:

Nominee	Actor
2	Millie Bobby Brown
2	Emilia Clarke
2	Gina Rodriguez
