= Florence by Mills =

American cosmetics brand

- Product type: Cosmetics; Fashion; Perfume; Coffee
- Current owner: Florence Beauty, LLC; Brown family (majority stake); Beach House Group (minority stake)
- Country: United States
- Introduced: August 26, 2019; 7 years ago
- Markets: Worldwide
- Ambassador: Millie Bobby Brown
- Website: florencebymills.com

Florence by Mills (stylized in all lowercase) is an American cosmetics and fashion brand. It is associated with actress Millie Bobby Brown, who acquired a majority stake in the parent company in late 2020. The name is derived from both Brown's great-grandmother, Florence, and the nickname Mills, for Brown herself. The brand has also ventured into fragrance manufacturing, and has been spun-off into a sub-brand dedicated to coffee, Florence by Mills Coffee and fashion, Florence by Mills Fashion

It was registered in Delaware on March 29, 2018, and was launched on August 26, 2019. The brand is owned by Florence Beauty, LLC, and was launched through the company Beach House Group, responsible for other celebrity-associated business, such as Kendall Jenner's brands. Brown later added fashion and clothing, which is only available online and cannot be bought in stores.

== History ==
Following her climb to fame through Stranger Things, Brown expressed interest in creating her own makeup brand for adolescents, specifically. Brown said that she had experienced many subpar makeup brands which were not suitable for the fatty and sensitive skin of teenagers, resulting in pimples and other difficulties. Florence is marketed toward Gen Z, and the products are intended to fit young people's skin. The brand was launched on August 26, 2019, being made available through retailers Ulta Beauty and Boots.

=== Majority stake acquisition by Millie Bobby Brown ===
In December 2020, the Beach House Group, up until that point the majority owner of the brand, announced that the Brown family had acquired a majority stake in the company, with the Beach House Group remaining as a minority stakeholder in the company. There was reportedly no animosity between the stakeholders, with CEO of Beach House Group PJ Brice stating that "There is no doubt that the brand will continue to prosper and expand, especially with Millie’s vision..." Paula Pontes remains as the brand's chief executive officer.

=== Perfume release, Florence by Mills Coffee and Florence by Mills Fashion ===
In March 2021, Florence Beauty, the parent company of the brand, signed a partnership agreement with Give Back Beauty, an Italian cosmetics and perfume group. Following this, Florence by Mills announced the launch of the perfume Wildly Me in late 2023, created in collaboration with Swiss perfume manufacturer Givaudan. Wildly Me is an eau de toilette, and was launched on August 22. It was reportedly under development for over two years.

Brown says that she has been passionate about coffee "ever since [she] can remember," frequently using it on set. Florence by Mills Coffee was announced as a product lineup in May 2023, being made available on the 18th that month. The range of products encompasses two "signature blends", a cold brew, and a selection of coffee syrups. One signature blend is a medium roast, while the second is a dark roast. The brand also launched a subscription service, using home delivery. In accordance with the corporate social responsibility of the brand, the products are Rainforest Alliance certified and the packaging recyclable.

Brown expanded her lifestyle brand into fashion with the 2024 launch of Florence by Mills Fashion in partnership with Delta Galil USA. Designed for Gen Z women, featuring baby cable cardigans, hoodies, mock-neck sweatshirts, softie seamless square-neck tops, scoop-neck cami tanks, seamless leggings, lace-trim slip dresses, foldover biker shorts, and wide-leg lounge pants. In January 2026, it was followed by an exclusive, budget-friendly teen collection called Mills by Millie Bobby Brown at Walmart.
