= 2017 MTV Movie & TV Awards =

American awards show

- Date: Sunday, May 7, 2017
- Location: Shrine Auditorium, Los Angeles, California
- Country: United States
- Hosted by: Adam DeVine

Highlights
- Most awards: Beauty and the Beast (2); Stranger Things (2)
- Most nominations: Get Out (7)

Television/radio coverage
- Network: MTV, MTV2, VH1, BET, MTV Classic, TV Land, Comedy Central, Logo TV, and Spike
- Produced by: Casey Patterson
- Directed by: Joe DeMaio

The 2017 MTV Movie & TV Awards was held on May 7, 2017, from the Shrine Auditorium in Los Angeles, California, U.S. It was the 26th edition of the awards, and for the first time it presented honors for work in television as well as cinema; it was also the first time men and women competed jointly in the acting categories since 2007. The awards ceremony was hosted by Adam DeVine and broadcast on numerous Viacom channels, MTV.com, and the MTV app on mobile devices.

The ceremony was preceded by the "Movie & Television Festival". It was a day-long event that was held outside the Shrine Auditorium and featured live performances by Bea Miller, All Time Low, and Zara Larsson; plus red carpet appearances by celebrities. Issa Rae served as the announcer for the event.

== Performers ==
=== Festival ===
- All Time Low - "Dirty Laundry"/"Weightless"
- Zara Larsson - "Don't Let Me Be Yours"/"Shape of You"
- Bea Miller - "I Can't Breathe"

=== Show ===
- Adam DeVine, Millie Bobby Brown, Lil Rel Howery, Blake Anderson, Chrissy Metz, DJ Nasty, Josh Gad, Mike Colter, Hailee Steinfeld, and Rebel Wilson – "Movies & TV" / "Be His Guest" / "Logan" / "Movies & TV (Reprise)" Medley (parody of the Beauty and the Beast songs)
- Noah Cyrus - "Stay Together"
- Pitbull and J Balvin ft. Camila Cabello - "Hey Ma"
- Big Sean - "Jump Out the Window"

=== House DJ ===
- DJ Nasty

== Presenters ==
- Asia Kate Dillon – presented Best Actor in a Movie
- Zac Efron and Alexandra Daddario – presented Best Actor in a Show
- DJ Khaled – introduced DJ Nasty
- Tom Holland and Zendaya – presented sneak peek to Spider-Man: Homecoming
- Milo Ventimiglia and Chrissy Metz – presented Best Duo
- Yara Shahidi and Shay Mitchell – introduced Noah Cyrus
- Allison Williams and Lil Rel Howery – presented Best Kiss
- Tracee Ellis Ross and Maxine Waters – presented Best Fight Against the System
- Gal Gadot – presented Generation Award, and introduced Pitbull, J Balvin, and Camila Cabello
- John Cena and Aaron Taylor-Johnson – presented Next Generation
- Jaeden Lieberher, Jeremy Ray Taylor, Sophia Lillis, Finn Wolfhard, Wyatt Oleff, Chosen Jacobs, and Jack Dylan Grazer – presented exclusive trailer to It
- Ansel Elgort and Hailee Steinfeld – presented Tear Jerker
- Martha Stewart and Snoop Dogg – presented Best Host
- Dane DeHaan and Cara Delevingne – introduced Big Sean
- Terrence J – presented Best Musical Performance (commercial break)
- Adam DeVine – presented Best Reality Competition and Best Comedic Performance
- Goldie Hawn and Amy Schumer – presented Movie of the Year
- Mark Wahlberg – presented exclusive clip from Transformers: The Last Knight
- Cast of 13 Reasons Why – presented Show of the Year
  (Dylan Minnette, Katherine Langford, Alisha Boe, Brandon Flynn, Justin Prentice, Miles Heizer, Ross Butler, Devin Druid, Brandon Larracuente, Ajiona Alexus, Michele Selene Ang, Tommy Dorfman, and Steven Silver)

== Winners and nominees ==
The full list of nominees was announced on April 6, 2017.

Movie of the Year	Show of the Year
Beauty and the Beast; The Edge of Seventeen; Get Out; Logan; Rogue One: A Star Wars Story	Stranger Things; Atlanta; Game of Thrones; Insecure; Pretty Little Liars; This Is Us
Best Actor in a Movie	Best Actor in a Show
Emma Watson – Beauty and the Beast; Taraji P. Henson – Hidden Figures; Daniel Kaluuya – Get Out; Hugh Jackman – Logan; James McAvoy – Split; Hailee Steinfeld – The Edge of Seventeen	Millie Bobby Brown – Stranger Things; Emilia Clarke – Game of Thrones; Donald Glover – Atlanta; Jeffrey Dean Morgan – The Walking Dead; Mandy Moore – This Is Us; Gina Rodriguez – Jane The Virgin
Best Comedic Performance	Best Hero
Lil Rel Howery – Get Out; Will Arnett – The Lego Batman Movie; Adam DeVine – Workaholics; Ilana Glazer and Abbi Jacobson – Broad City; Seth Rogen – Sausage Party; Seth MacFarlane – Family Guy	Taraji P. Henson – Hidden Figures; Stephen Amell – Arrow; Millie Bobby Brown – Stranger Things; Mike Colter – Luke Cage; Grant Gustin – The Flash; Felicity Jones – Rogue One: A Star Wars Story
Best Villain	Best Kiss
Jeffrey Dean Morgan – The Walking Dead; Wes Bentley – American Horror Story: Roanoke; Demogorgon – Stranger Things; Jared Leto – Suicide Squad; Allison Williams – Get Out	Ashton Sanders and Jharrel Jerome – Moonlight; Zac Efron and Anna Kendrick – Mike and Dave Need Wedding Dates; Taraji P. Henson and Terrence Howard – Empire; Emma Stone and Ryan Gosling – La La Land; Emma Watson and Dan Stevens – Beauty and the Beast
Best Documentary	Best Reality Competition
13th; I Am Not Your Negro; O.J.: Made in America; This Is Everything: Gigi Gorgeous; Time: The Kalief Browder Story	RuPaul's Drag Race; America's Got Talent; The Bachelor; MasterChef Junior; The Voice
Best Host	Tearjerker
Trevor Noah – The Daily Show; Samantha Bee – Full Frontal with Samantha Bee; Ellen DeGeneres – The Ellen DeGeneres Show; John Oliver – Last Week Tonight with John Oliver; RuPaul – RuPaul's Drag Race	This Is Us – Jack and Randall at karate; Game of Thrones – Hodor's death; Grey's Anatomy – Meredith tells her children about Derek's death; Me Before You – Will tells Louisa he can't stay with her; Moonlight – Paula tells Chiron that she loves him
Next Generation	Best Duo
Daniel Kaluuya – Get Out; Riz Ahmed – Rogue One: A Star Wars Story; Chrissy Metz – This Is Us; Issa Rae – Insecure; Yara Shahidi – Black-ish	Hugh Jackman and Dafne Keen – Logan; Josh Gad and Luke Evans – Beauty and the Beast; Brian Tyree Henry and Keith Stanfield – Atlanta; Daniel Kaluuya and Lil Rel Howery – Get Out; Adam Levine and Blake Shelton – The Voice; Martha Stewart and Snoop Dogg – Martha & Snoop's Potluck Dinner Party
Best American Story	Best Fight Against the System
Black-ish; Fresh Off the Boat; Jane the Virgin; Moonlight; Transparent	Hidden Figures; Get Out; Loving; Luke Cage; Mr. Robot
Best Musical Moment	Trending
"You're the One That I Want" – Ensemble (Grease: Live); "Beauty and the Beast" – Ariana Grande and John Legend (Beauty and the Beast); "Can't Stop the Feeling!" – Justin Timberlake (Trolls); "How Far I'll Go" – Auliʻi Cravalho (Moana); "City of Stars" – Ryan Gosling and Emma Stone (La La Land); "Be That As It May" – Herizen F. Guardiola (The Get Down); "You Can't Stop the Beat" – Ensemble (Hairspray Live!)	"Run the World (Girls)" with Channing Tatum and Beyoncé – Lip Sync Battle; "Sean Spicer's Press Conference" feat. Melissa McCarthy – Saturday Night Live; "Lady Gaga's Carpool Karaoke" – The Late Late Show with James Corden; "Cash Me Outside How Bow Dat" – Dr. Phil; "Wheel of Musical Impressions with Demi Lovato" – The Tonight Show Starring Jimmy Fallon; Winona Ryder's Winning SAG Awards Reaction – 23rd Annual SAG Awards

=== MTV Generation Award ===
- Fast & Furious franchise

== Multiple nominations ==
Film

The following movies received multiple nominations:

- Seven – Get Out
- Five – Beauty and the Beast
- Three – Hidden Figures, Logan, Moonlight, Rogue One: A Star Wars Story
- Two – The Edge of Seventeen, La La Land

Television

The following television series received multiple nominations:

- Four – Stranger Things
- Three – Atlanta, Game of Thrones, This Is Us
- Two – Black-ish, Insecure, Jane the Virgin, Luke Cage, RuPaul's Drag Race, The Voice, The Walking Dead
