= Eleven (Stranger Things) =

Protagonist of Stranger Things

- Stranger Things character
- Millie Bobby Brown as Eleven in the fifth season
- First appearance: "Chapter One: The Vanishing of Will Byers" (2016)
- Created by: The Duffer Brothers
- Designed by: The Duffer Brothers
- Portrayed by: Millie Bobby Brown; Charlotte and Clara Ward (young; season 2); Martie Blair (young; season 4)
- Voiced by: Charlie Duncan (Smite); Ali Hillis (Stranger Things VR); Brooklyn Davey Norstedt (Tales from '85); Abby Espiritu (Dead by Daylight)

In-universe information
- Full name: Jane Ives (birth name); Jane Hopper (legal name)
- Aliases: 011 (subject name); The Weirdo; Eleanor; Shirley Temple; Supergirl; The Mage
- Nickname: El
- Occupation: Test subject at Hawkins National Laboratory (1971–1983); Student at Lenora Hills High School (1985–1986); Test subject at the Nina Project (1986)
- Family: Terry Ives (biological mother); Andrew Rich (biological father; deceased); Jim Hopper (adoptive father); Joyce Byers (step mother); Kali Prasad (adoptive sister; deceased); Will Byers (step brother); Jonathan Byers (step brother)
- Relatives: Becky Ives (aunt)
- Home: Hawkins, Indiana, United States (seasons 1–3, 5); Lenora Hills, California, United States (season 4); Iceland (season 5 finale, assumed)
- Born: June 7, 1971
- Age: 16
- Abilities: Telekinesis; Telepathy

Jane Hopper, better known as Eleven or "El", is a fictional and main character in the Netflix science fiction horror television series Stranger Things and its spin-off series Stranger Things: Tales from '85. She is portrayed by Millie Bobby Brown in the series and voiced by Brooklyn Davey Norstedt in the spin-off. Eleven has psychokinetic and telepathic powers.

== Fictional character biography ==
Born Jane Ives on June 7, 1971, Eleven is the daughter of Teresa "Terry" Ives. Terry was one of the test subjects in MKUltra, a real-life Central Intelligence Agency (CIA)-sanctioned program where the government conducted mind control experiments on real people. According to the series, Terry joined the program as a college student in 1969 under the supervision of Dr. Martin Brenner. Terry was subjected to experiments, including drug testing, psychedelic drugs, and being submerged in sensory deprivation tanks. She did not know she was pregnant at the time with her and her boyfriend, Andrew Rich's, baby while these experiments were taking place. Andrew's identity is only revealed in Suspicious Minds. Andrew died fighting in the Vietnam War, before he ever learned he was going to be a father. His death was not a total accident, as Dr. Brenner had Andrew expelled from college, which made him eligible for the draft. This was not only a form of punishment for Terry, but it also made it easier to take their daughter away. Dr. Brenner is able to cover up Eleven's kidnapping by making it look like Terry miscarried. He took Eleven to Hawkins National Laboratory in order to develop her psychokinetic skills. Everyone, including Terry's sister Becky, believed the miscarriage story; Terry never did and knew her daughter was still alive. She tried to sue the government for stealing her child, but the case was ultimately dismissed. Terry stormed Hawkins Lab in 1974 in order to get her child back. She was able to find Eleven and Kali (008) playing in the Rainbow Room. Before she could leave with her daughter, Terry was captured by lab workers and given electroshock therapy until she experienced severe brain damage.

Eleven appears to have been born a psychic with notable telekinetic and extrasensory abilities. However, when she uses these abilities to a significant degree, she becomes temporarily weakened and her nose bleeds. When placed in a sensory deprivation tank, she can use remote viewing to access other dimensions, primarily for the purposes of espionage. In addition, Eleven can open and close portals, known as "Gates", to a parallel dimension called the Upside Down.

=== Season 1 ===
In the first season, Eleven escapes from Hawkins National Laboratory wearing only her hospital gown and attempts to steal food from a local restaurant. The owner Benny takes pity on her and calls social services while putting her in a long t-shirt associated with the restaurant. The responding social worker, who turns out to be an agent sent from Hawkins Laboratory, kills Benny. Eleven then flees before she can be taken again. She is encountered by Mike Wheeler (Finn Wolfhard), Dustin Henderson (Gaten Matarazzo) and Lucas Sinclair (Caleb McLaughlin), who are looking for their missing friend Will Byers (Noah Schnapp). The boys learn her name is Eleven from a "011" tattoo on her left forearm. Mike decides to call her "El" for short and allows Eleven to live in his basement while providing her with some new clothes. Fearing recapture, Eleven convinces Mike not to tell any adults, so Dr. Brenner, whom she calls "Papa" and the people that work for him, called "Bad Men", cannot find her.

Eleven helps to locate Will and determines that he is trapped in a parallel dimension, which the children dub the "Upside Down", where he is being hunted by a creature called the "Demogorgon". The group sets out to find Will using their compasses, but Eleven interferes with their search when she realizes they are being led toward Hawkins Laboratory. Lucas, upon noticing her deception, becomes angry; she knocks him unconscious and flees. She later steals Eggo waffles from a grocery store and eats them in the forest. Mike and Dustin are later threatened by bullies (whom Eleven calls "mouth breathers"); Mike is forced to jump off a high cliff into a lake while Dustin is held hostage. Eleven returns and intervenes before Mike hits the water, frightening the bullies and saving both Mike and Dustin.

Eleven, Mike, and Dustin reunite with Lucas and make amends. They travel to the town junkyard with Dr. Brenner and his associates in close pursuit. During the chase, a government van catches up to the children; Eleven uses her powers to flip the van through the air, blocking the convoy's path and allowing the group to flee. They are then joined by Joyce Byers (Winona Ryder), Hawkins police chief Jim Hopper (David Harbour), Nancy Wheeler (Natalia Dyer), and Jonathan Byers (Charlie Heaton). Together, they create a makeshift isolation tank with a pool and bags of salt in order to help Eleven access the Upside Down. Eleven, using her powers, confirms that Will is alive, but says that Barbara (Barb), Nancy's friend taken shortly after Will, is "gone". As government forces close in on the school, Mike tells Eleven she can be a part of his family; he then asks her to the school dance and kisses her after struggling to explain his feelings. Eleven later helps the group escape by using her powers to kill most of the agents. After the Demogorgon makes its way into their dimension, Eleven seemingly sacrifices herself to destroy the creature and save her friends.

One month later, after a Christmas party, Hopper leaves the police station and drives to the woods. There, he leaves waffles in a concealed box. Eleven's condition and location are left ambiguous.

=== Season 2 ===
After defeating the Demogorgon, Eleven wakes up in the Upside Down. She escapes through a portal that leads her back to Hawkins Middle School. With the government still searching for her, she is forced to hide in the forest. Eleven eventually finds the Eggos Hopper has left for her and seeks him out. The two move into a fortified cabin in the woods, where he forbids her to leave, fearing for her safety. Hopper hides Eleven indoors for almost a year, concealing her survival and whereabouts from everyone, including the children. During this time, Eleven gains better control over her powers; she is less weakened by the use of her telekinesis, and she is now able to project her mind without the use of a sensory deprivation tank. She uses the latter ability to listen to Mike's attempts to contact her, though she is increasingly frustrated at her inability to reply. Eleven also significantly expands her vocabulary during this time, learning from both Hopper and television.

Eleven becomes restless and longs to reunite with Mike and his friends, which causes tension between her and Hopper. One day, she runs away from home and travels to Hawkins Middle School. When she finds Mike with a new student Max Mayfield (Sadie Sink), Eleven mistakenly thinks Max is flirting with Mike. Out of jealousy, she uses her powers to knock Max off her skateboard before leaving. Upon returning to the cabin, she gets into a heated argument with Hopper over her leaving without permission, ending with her angrily using her powers to damage the cabin. The next day, whilst cleaning the mess she made, Eleven looks through records in the cabin's basement and discovers that her birth mother, Terry, is alive, contradicting what Hopper and Dr. Brenner had told her. She runs away once again and hitchhikes to her mother's residence, where she first meets her aunt Becky. Through Becky, Eleven finds out what happened to Terry at Hawkins National Laboratory. While there, she realizes Terry is trying to communicate with her, but is unable to effectively do so due to her catatonic state. Eleven, using her powers, views a flashback of her mother. After her daughter was taken from her, Terry attempted to force her way into Hawkins National Laboratory to save her. As a response, Brenner and his assistants capture her and subject her head to 450 volts of electricity, resulting in her current condition. This makes the words "breathe", "sunflower", "rainbow", "450", "three to the right, four to the left" repeat in her head faster and faster. "Breathe" for what Becky repeated to Terry when she was in labor; "sunflower" for the first thing she saw after her C-section; "rainbow" for the room she found Eleven and Kali in; "450" for the voltage of the electroshock therapy she forcefully received; and "three to the right, four to the left" for the combination to her safe where she kept her gun.

Eleven then uses her abilities to find out she has a "sister"—another gifted girl taken by Dr. Brenner for experimentation—and sets out to find her.

Using her abilities once again, Eleven locates her sister and discovers that she is an older girl named Kali Prasad (Linnea Berthelsen), ID number 008, who can cause people to experience visual hallucinations. Eleven finds and stays with Kali and her friends in Chicago—runaways who are determined to take revenge on people who have hurt them. Kali teaches Eleven to focus on her anger to get the most out of her powers; she successfully uses this tactic to move a railcar, impressing Kali and eliciting cheers from the gang. Later, the group tracks down Ray Carroll, a former Hawkins Lab employee. When she discovers that he was one of the individuals responsible for Terry's condition, Eleven begins to choke him to death in a rage. However, she stops upon realizing that he has two daughters, and ends up preventing Kali from shooting him. Back at the hideout, Eleven witnesses Hopper and Mike in danger through the void. While the gang is about to flee, Eleven realizes she needs to return to her friends to save them.

Eleven goes back to Hawkins and finally reunites with Mike with a heartfelt embrace and her friends after saving them from a Demodog. The group realizes that she needs to close the gate to the Upside Down, and she and Hopper head to Hawkins Laboratory. There, Eleven remembers Kali's lessons and focuses her anger on her powers, closing the gate and draining her energy. Afterwards, Dr. Sam Owens (Paul Reiser) meets up with Hopper and hands him a forged birth certificate, which allows Hopper to legally adopt Eleven, and tells him that she must be hidden for at least a year to ensure her safety. Eleven's name now changes from Jane Ives to Jane Hopper. However, on Owen's advice, Hopper lets her attend the Snow Ball at Hawkins Middle School. She meets up with Mike, dances with him, and they share their first kiss as a couple. Hopper's daughter, Sarah, wore a blue hair tie before she died, which Hopper made into a bracelet that he wore throughout the first two seasons. Eleven wears the same bracelet to the school dance.

Back in the Upside Down, the Mind Flayer observes Eleven and her friends at the high school.

=== Season 3 ===
At the start of season three, Eleven and Mike have been dating for seven months, much to the dismay of Hopper, who is annoyed that Eleven and Mike are constantly together. When Hopper confesses to Joyce that he feels uncomfortable about the situation, she suggests that he sit down and calmly talk to Eleven and Mike about how he feels. However, this backfires, and Hopper resorts to directly instructing Mike to stay away from Eleven, threatening to end their relationship if he does not comply. When Mike is forced to lie to Eleven about why he can no longer visit her, she becomes suspicious and seeks advice from Max, who asserts that Mike is pushing Eleven aside to spend time with the boys. To take her mind off the situation, Max suggests that they have some fun of their own by going shopping at the newly built Starcourt Mall.

The girls spend quality time together at the mall, where they encounter Lucas, Will, and Mike attempting to buy Eleven a makeup present. When Mike lies and says the present is for his sick grandmother, Eleven breaks up with him on the spot, to Max's delight (as similar things had been happening between her and Lucas) and Mike's shock. Eleven then leaves on a bus with Max, where the girls spend the night sleeping over at Hopper's house and use Eleven's psychic powers to spy on the boys. For their amusement, they create a game in which they spin a bottle and have Eleven observe whoever it lands on. When the bottle lands on Billy Hargrove (Dacre Montgomery) and he is watched, he appears to behave suspiciously and erratically. This concerns Eleven and Max enough that the two go out to the Hawkins Community Pool, where he works as a lifeguard, to look for him. In the process, they discover that Heather Holloway, one of Billy's coworkers, has gone missing. They soon learn that Billy has been corrupted by the Mind Flayer and is taking Heather to be assimilated.

They reunite with Mike, Lucas, and Will. Mike is annoyed that Eleven would spy on him and has an argument with Max about his feelings for Eleven while she is spying on the Flayer. She holds off the Mind Flayer when the cabin is attacked, but the Flayer wounds her and leaves a piece of itself in the wound. Eleven and Mike make up, but the Mind Flayer and Billy track them due to El's wound. Eleven loses her powers after removing the piece of the monster from her leg, but helps Billy to break free of the Mind Flayer's possession by recalling his childhood memories. The group defeats the Mind Flayer by closing the portal to the Upside Down and with Billy's sacrifice. Hopper is presumed dead in the explosion that closes the gate, and Eleven is taken in by the Byers. While the Byers are packing to leave Hawkins, Eleven reveals to Mike that she also loves him, and they share a kiss. Joyce gives her a letter written by Hopper that he intended to use when talking to her and Mike about how he felt about them dating. Eleven and the Byers then leave Hawkins, where Eleven cries as they drive away.

=== Season 4 ===
At the start of season four, Eleven begins attending school in California alongside Will and struggles with the loss of her powers and with being bullied by a girl named Angela (Élodie Grace Orkin). When Mike comes to visit, Eleven pretends she has many friends to please Mike, but Will isn't convinced. She is humiliated at a roller rink and strikes Angela in the face with a roller skate in retaliation. She is taken into police custody, but Dr. Owens intercepts her arrest and takes her with him. He explains that Hawkins is in danger and that he has been working on a program that may be able to restore Eleven's powers. Eleven agrees to participate, risking that she may never see her friends ever again. Eleven is taken to a facility in Nevada and discovers Dr. Brenner is still alive. Eleven tries to run, only to end up tranquilized.

After Eleven's hair is cut and she is placed in a short jumpsuit offscreen, she is placed into a sensory deprivation tank (dubbed NINA) and relives her repressed memories of her time at Hawkins lab. A barefoot Eleven attempts to escape the facility, but discovers her powers are slowly returning, convincing her to stay. She discovers she was often ostracized by the other children, but a kindly orderly (Jamie Campbell Bower) watched over her and gave her advice on controlling her powers. The orderly, who is in fact Subject One in Brenner's experiments, manipulated Eleven into removing an implant in his neck that suppressed his powers, then went on to massacre the rest of the children and staff in the lab. One later revealed himself to be Henry Creel, who killed his mother and sister in the 1950s and got his father arrested for it. Henry attempted to kill Eleven after she refused to help him eradicate humanity, but she overpowered him and sent him into the Upside Down, where he became Vecna. Brenner discovers Eleven at the scene of the massacre, where she fell comatose and forgot the events. Brenner discovered the events through security cameras and had Eleven spy on the Russians as a cover for searching for Henry.

Eleven discovers the Hawkins group's plan to kill Vecna by using Max as bait to lure him out and convinces Owens to help her return to Hawkins. However, Brenner locks Owens up and traps Eleven, placing a shock collar on her so she cannot leave. When the army attacks the base, Brenner flees with Eleven but is shot and incapacitated; however, she is able to destroy the helicopter and vehicles as Mike, Will, Jonathan, and Argyle (Eduardo Franco) arrive. Brenner unlocks the collar and tells Eleven they are family, but she refuses to forgive him, and he dies. The group goes to Argyle's pizza place, where they create an isolation tank for her to enter Max's mind at the same time as Vecna as Eleven lays barefoot in it. Vecna overwhelms Eleven and breaks Max's bones and blinds her before Mike tells Eleven that he loves her, which gives her the strength to break his control. Despite her efforts, Max still ends up in a coma from her injuries.

The group returns to Hawkins, and Eleven reunites with Hopper, who compliments her shortened hair. Will senses the Upside Down, and they all discover that it has begun to infiltrate and take over Hawkins.

=== Season 5 ===
Following the opening of the gates at the end of the previous season, the military suppresses public knowledge of the disaster while intensifying efforts to pursue Eleven, viewing her as the cause of the escalating events despite Vecna's involvement. 19 months later, Eleven's hair is now in a bun as she trains herself for her next fight with Vecna. When Holly Wheeler is lost inside the Upside Down, Eleven decides to intervene. Although Hopper is reluctant to let her return, he ultimately accompanies her to investigate military activity in the dimension and assist in locating Holly.

Eleven infiltrates a military research facility located inside the Upside Down, timing her entrance with thunder to avoid detection. Inside, she and Hopper discover that the military has developed technology that temporarily weakens her abilities. When Hopper is seized by vines, Eleven attempts to intervene, but her powers are suppressed long enough for him to be captured and interrogated by Dr. Kay (Linda Hamilton). Kay presses Hopper for information about Eleven, unaware she is attempting to reach him.

As Eleven regains her strength and breaks through security, she confronts Kay and tries to kill her telekinetically, but fails due to the lingering effects of the inhibitor. Hopper lowers the room's temperature to weaken the vines, allowing him to escape restraint and incapacitate Kay. During the escape, Eleven accidentally exposes a bomb hidden under Hopper's jacket, prompting an emotional confrontation when he insists on sacrificing himself. She refuses to abandon him and pursues him through the facility until Hopper suddenly returns, having changed his mind after encountering someone unexpected.

Hopper steps aside, revealing the survival and return of Kali Prasad marking a major reunion and shift in Eleven's fight against the Upside Down.

In the series finale, Eleven confronts Vecna in both his mind and the real world while her friends fight and kill the Mind Flayer. For the mind part in an isolation tank, Eleven goes barefoot and wears a spring wetsuit as she takes Max and Kali into the mind. This lasts until Vecna tricks Hopper into destroying the tank. Using his own recently developed telekinetic abilities, Will restrains Vecna, allowing Eleven to fatally impale him before Joyce finishes Vecna off with an axe. As the Upside Down is destroyed, Eleven seemingly remains behind to die so as to ensure that the military can never use her to create another Henry Creel, saying a final telepathic goodbye to Mike. Eighteen months later, and after having a realization during his high school graduation that Eleven could not have used her powers to enter his mind while under the effects of the military's sonic weapons, Mike relates his theory to his friends that Eleven survived and that the dying Kali used her powers to project an illusion of Eleven's death while she escaped undetected. His friends profess their belief and hope in Mike's theory that she escaped and found somewhere to settle down peacefully. While Mike is explaining his theory, footage is shown of Eleven as she hikes towards a town near three waterfalls.

== Development ==
=== Conception and writing ===
The Duffer Brothers based the character of Eleven on survivors of the MKUltra experiments, with influences from E.T. from Steven Spielberg's 1982 film E.T. the Extra-Terrestrial, Carrie White from Stephen King's 1974 novel Carrie and the 1976 film Carrie, Charlie McGee from Stephen King's 1980 novel Firestarter and the 1984 film Firestarter and the idea of being an outsider. They also drew inspiration from the anime Elfen Lied and Akira, saying they "wanted there to be a mystery in her past, and also have her seem a little scary." Eleven was also inspired by Jean Grey from Marvel's X-Men comics. Originally planned as a feature film, Stranger Things was then pitched to Netflix as a limited series, and it was planned that Eleven would sacrifice herself in the last episode of the series. After Netflix was then keen for the show to be continued in a second season, the brothers decided to change the ending to keep the character alive.

=== Casting ===
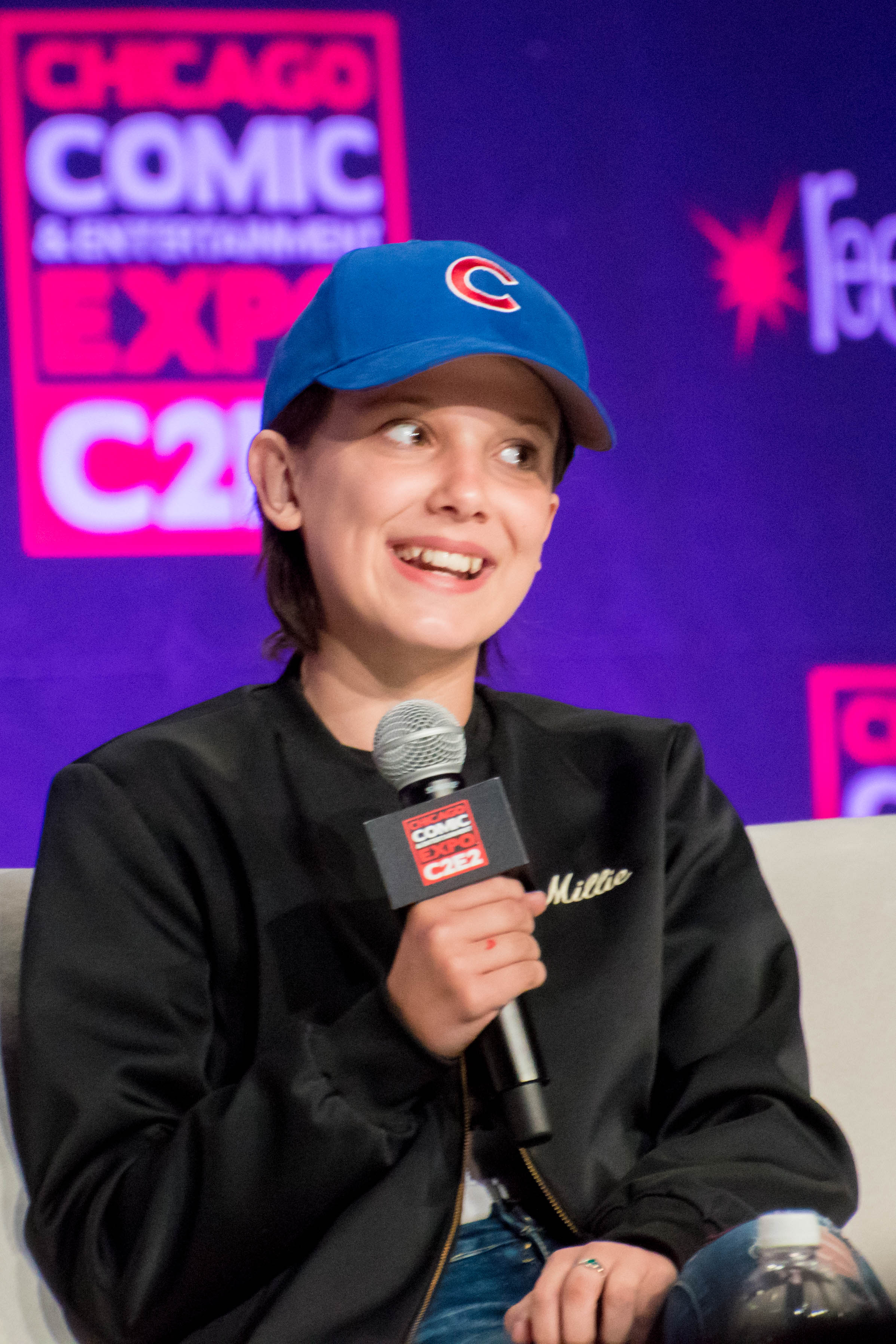
Millie Bobby Brown first played Eleven when she was 11 years old.

The brothers believed Eleven was the most difficult role to cast, as the character had few lines. They wanted a child actor who was able to convey much emotion. The Duffers were concerned they would not find someone who could stay in character when not speaking. The brothers were relieved after meeting Millie Bobby Brown, whom they described as "something special, alright, with a downright spooky preternatural talent." Brown had to shave her head for the role, something she and her parents were worried would turn out poorly and cost her future roles, until they were shown a photo of Charlize Theron as Imperator Furiosa in Mad Max: Fury Road.

== In other media ==
Eleven makes a silent cameo appearance in Odder Stuff, an in-universe television series in The Simpsons' thirtieth season episode "I'm Dancing as Fat as I Can", released on February 10, 2019. Eleven's Stranger Things role is then embodied by Lisa Simpson (voiced by Yeardley Smith) in the 31st season "Treehouse of Horror XXX" segment "Danger Things", released on October 20, 2019.

A violent parody of Eleven named Cindy is portrayed by Ess Hödlmoser in the second season of the Amazon Prime Video streaming television series The Boys and the promotional web series Vought News Network: Seven on 7 with Cameron Coleman.

In November 2023, Eleven was added as a cosmetic outfit to Fortnite Battle Royale during Season OG.

In November 2025, Eleven and other Stranger Things characters were added as skins for Lumi in the mobile game Brawl Stars.

In January 2026, Eleven and other Stranger Things characters were added as playable characters in the online horror game Dead by Daylight.

== Reception ==
=== Critical reception ===
Eleven's character and Millie Bobby Brown's performance have received widespread critical acclaim throughout the run of Stranger Things. Early reviews frequently identified Brown's portrayal as a standout element of the series. Writing for The Guardian, Lucy Mangan praised the child cast, singling out Brown's performance as Eleven as particularly strong. Vulture similarly described Brown's work as a "sublime" performance, noting her ability to convey emotion through minimal dialogue. The Daily Telegraph characterized Brown as the "star of the show" and credited her with carrying much of the series' emotional weight. Collectively, critics emphasized Eleven's empathy, strength, and vulnerability, with many describing her as one of the most memorable and iconic characters in the show's 1980s-inspired setting.

Later seasons prompted more varied critical discussion of the character's narrative development. Some commentators argued that certain storylines diminished Eleven's impact, particularly during the second season, when her temporary separation from the main ensemble and her "punk" makeover were met with mixed reactions. One episode centered on the character was widely criticized for diverging from the core narrative. Writing for The Atlantic, Lenika Cruz observed that, despite her detailed backstory, Eleven at times remained the series' "most thinly sketched protagonist." Nevertheless, Brown's performance continued to receive consistent praise. Reviews of the third and fourth seasons generally reaffirmed Eleven's role as the emotional focal point of the series, with critics noting the character's continued appeal as the narrative expanded. Overall, critical consensus has held that, despite occasional criticism of individual plot choices, Brown's portrayal of Eleven consistently provided emotional depth and remained central to the show's success.

=== Cultural impact ===
Eleven rapidly emerged as a pop culture phenomenon following the debut of the series. The character inspired extensive fan engagement, including fan art, tattoos, and cosplay, reflecting both her distinctive visual identity and emotional resonance. The Daily Telegraph reported that Eleven inspired widespread fan creativity and contributed to renewed global recognition of Eggo waffles, a product closely associated with the character. In media commentary, Eleven has frequently been described as a symbol of 1980s nostalgia, as well as an example of empowered girlhood in contemporary television.

Mainstream coverage also highlighted the character's influence on consumer culture. Time magazine noted that Eleven's fondness for waffles made her an unexpected cultural ambassador for the Eggo brand. In 2025, Eggo's parent company Kellanova released Stranger Things–themed waffle products to coincide with the series' conclusion, explicitly referencing Eleven's cultural legacy and her association with the brand.

Eleven also became a recurring presence in Halloween celebrations and fan conventions. Costumes based on her signature pink dress and blue jacket were among the most popular Halloween costumes in 2016 and 2017. Media coverage documented both celebratory tributes and occasional controversies, including criticism of sexualized costume interpretations of the character. Cosplayers of various ages have portrayed Eleven at conventions, and the character has been parodied and referenced in other television programs, including sketch comedy shows. Beyond popular media, Eleven has been the subject of academic analysis, with a 2025 scholarly study identifying the character as part of Stranger Things' contribution to shifting representations of female characters and relationships on television.

=== Awards and nominations ===
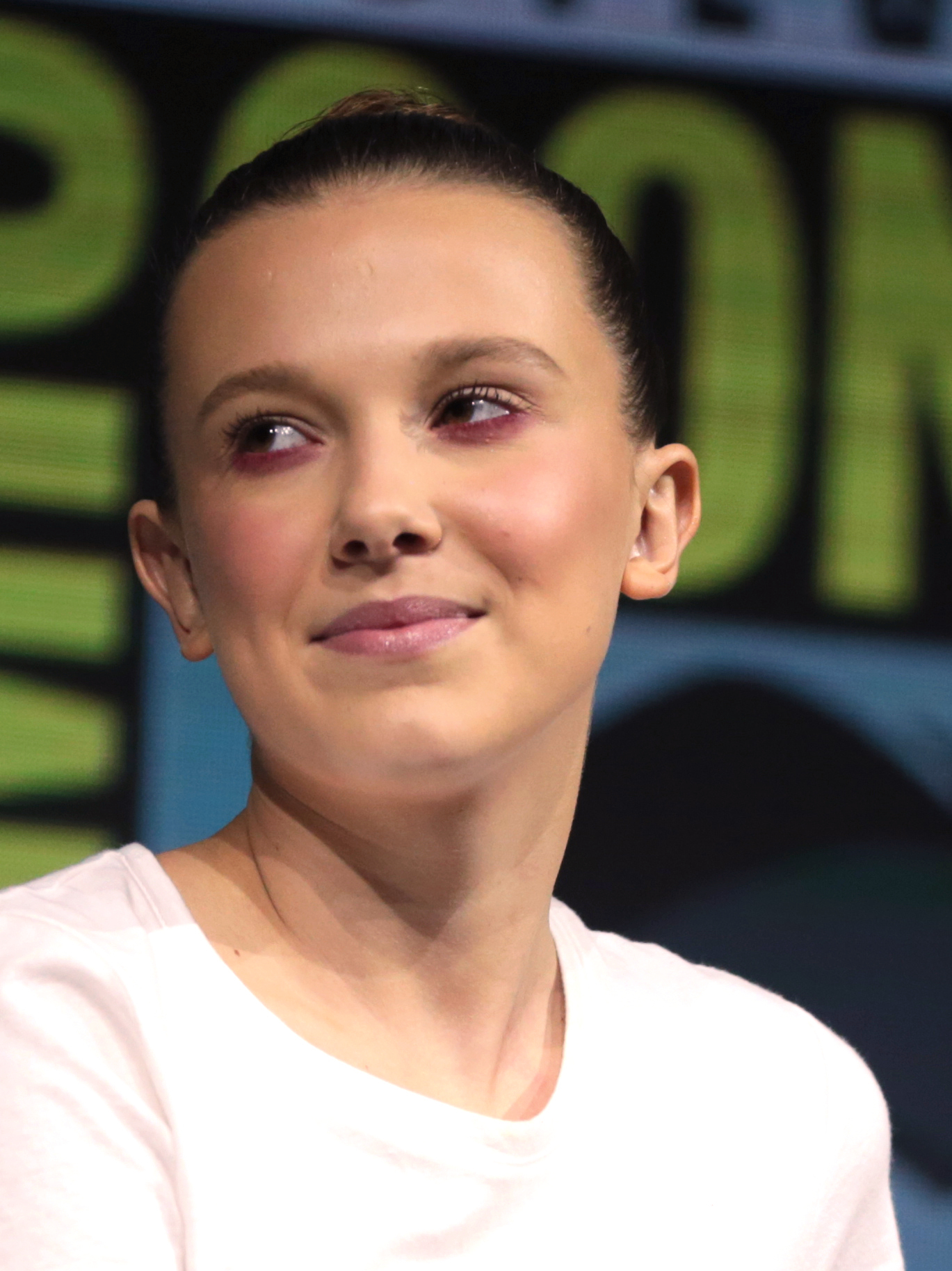
The performance of Millie Bobby Brown received widespread acclaim.

Brown's portrayal of Eleven has been acknowledged by major industry and genre award bodies. She received nominations for the Primetime Emmy Award for Outstanding Supporting Actress in a Drama Series in 2017 and 2018, making her one of the youngest performers nominated in that category for her work on Stranger Things. Brown was also nominated for Outstanding Performance by a Female Actor in a Drama Series at the Screen Actors Guild Awards in 2017 and 2018, and she was part of the Stranger Things ensemble that won the Screen Actors Guild Award for Outstanding Performance by an Ensemble in a Drama Series in 2017. Her early work in the series garnered her the Saturn Award for Best Performance by a Younger Actor in a Television Series in 2017, including a nomination in the same category in 2018. Brown received a further Saturn Award nomination for Best Actress in a Television Series for her performance as Eleven at the 2026 ceremony.

In addition to these, Brown achieved recognition at youth- and fan-oriented award shows, winning Best Performance in a Show at the MTV Movie & TV Awards in both 2017 and 2018, and receiving multiple nominations in subsequent years. Brown won Favorite TV Actress and Favorite Female TV Star at the Nickelodeon Kids' Choice Awards in 2018 and 2020 respectively, including nominations in 2019 and 2023 for her work on Stranger Things. Brown's broader industry accolades include nominations from the Online Film & Television Association Television Awards and other critics' organizations for her performances in television and genre productions. In early 2026, she was honoured with the Personality of the Year award at the Joy Awards, a ceremony celebrating entertainment figures for their impact and influence, reflecting recognition beyond traditional television awards.

== See also ==
- List of Stranger Things characters
