= 23rd Screen Actors Guild Awards =

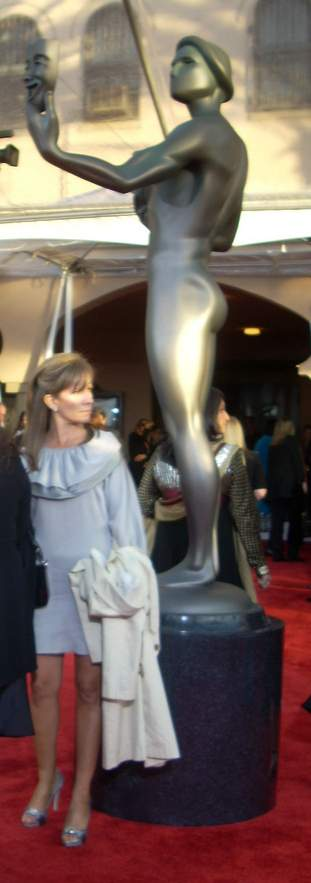
- Awarded for: Outstanding motion picture and primetime television performances
- Date: January 29, 2017
- Location: Shrine Auditorium; Los Angeles, California
- Country: United States
- Presented by: SAG-AFTRA
- Website: www.sagawards.org

Television/radio coverage
- Network: TNT and TBS simultaneous broadcast

The 23rd Annual Screen Actors Guild Awards, honoring the best achievements in film and television performances for the year 2016, were presented on January 29, 2017, at the Shrine Auditorium in Los Angeles, California, United States. The ceremony was broadcast on both TNT and TBS 8:00 p.m. EST / 5:00 p.m. PST. The nominees were announced on December 14, 2016.

Lily Tomlin was announced as the 2016 SAG Life Achievement Award honoree on August 4, 2016.

== Winners and nominees ==
Note: Winners are listed first and highlighted in boldface.

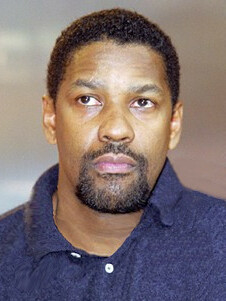
Denzel Washington, Outstanding Performance by a Male Actor in a Leading Role winner

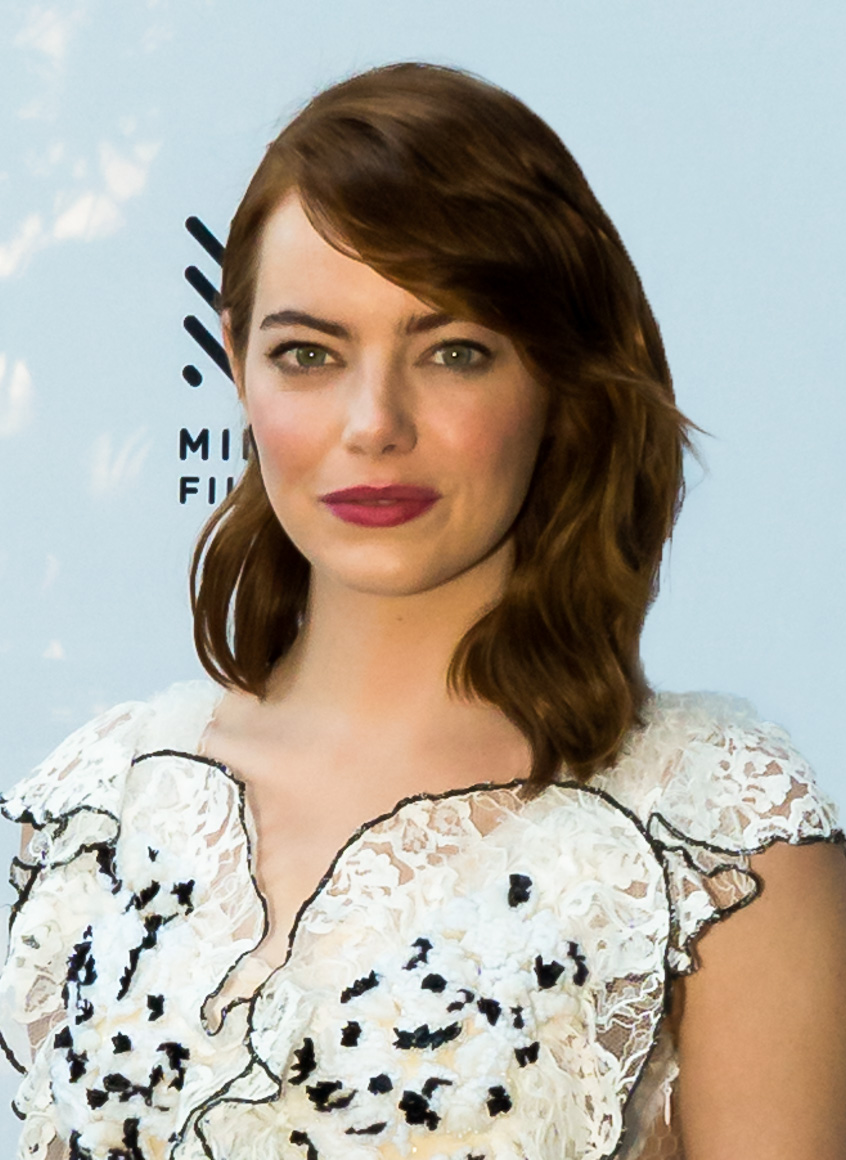
Emma Stone, Outstanding Performance by a Female Actor in a Leading Role winner

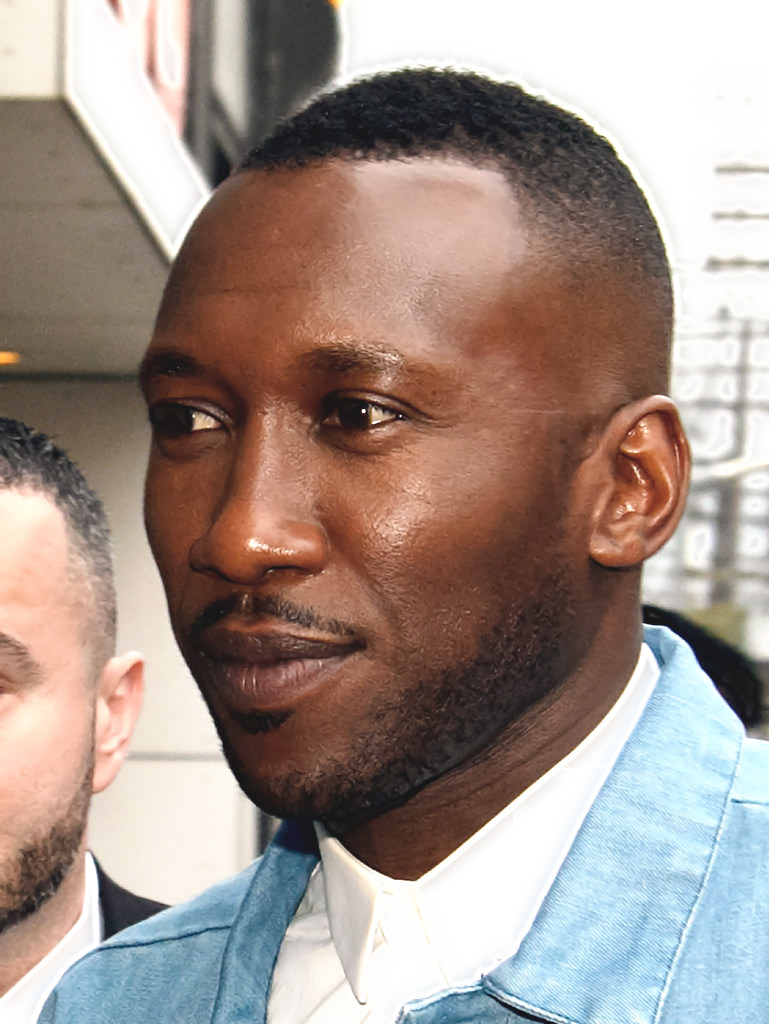
Mahershala Ali, Outstanding Performance by a Male Actor in a Supporting Role winner

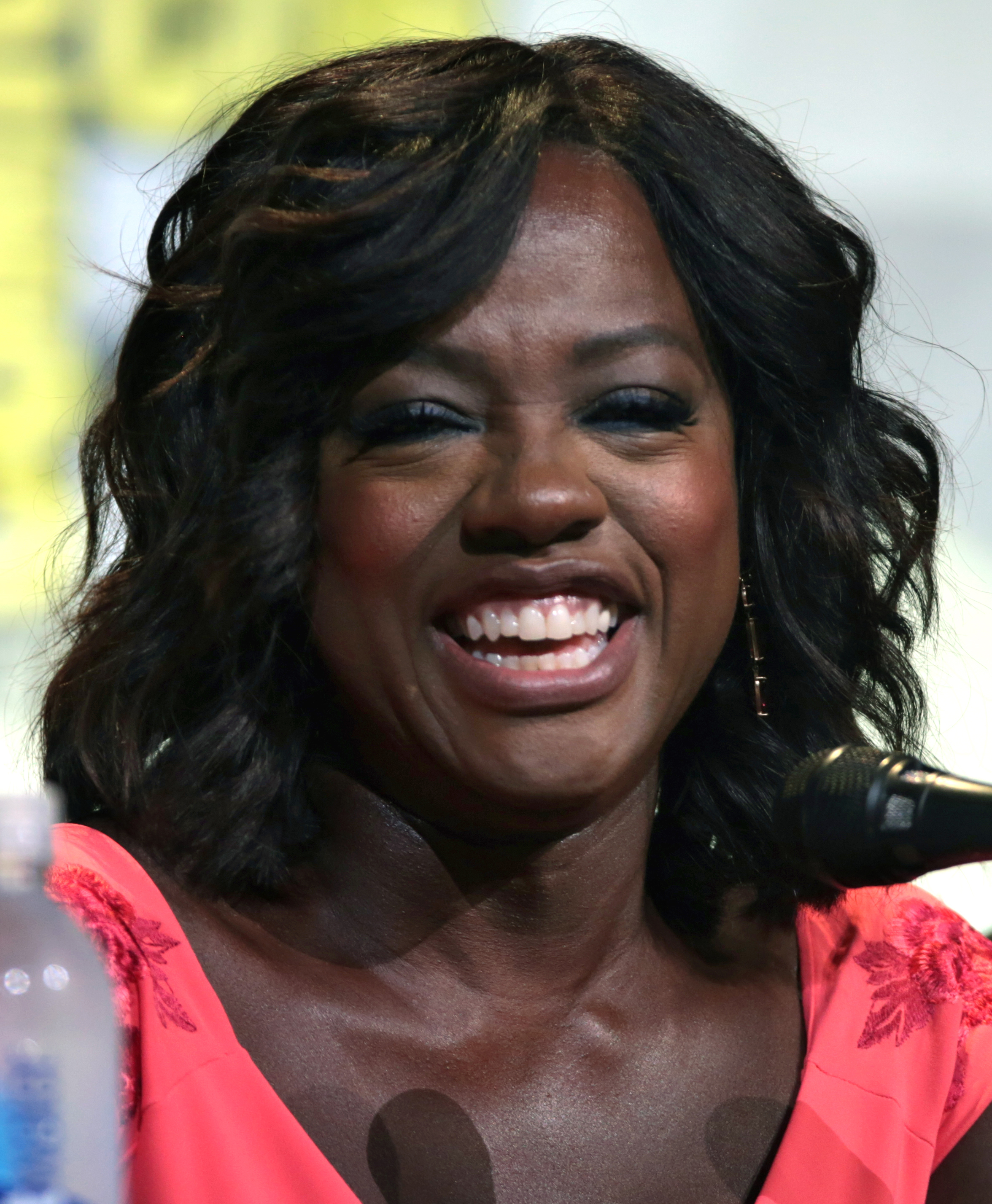
Viola Davis, Outstanding Performance by a Female Actor in a Supporting Role winner

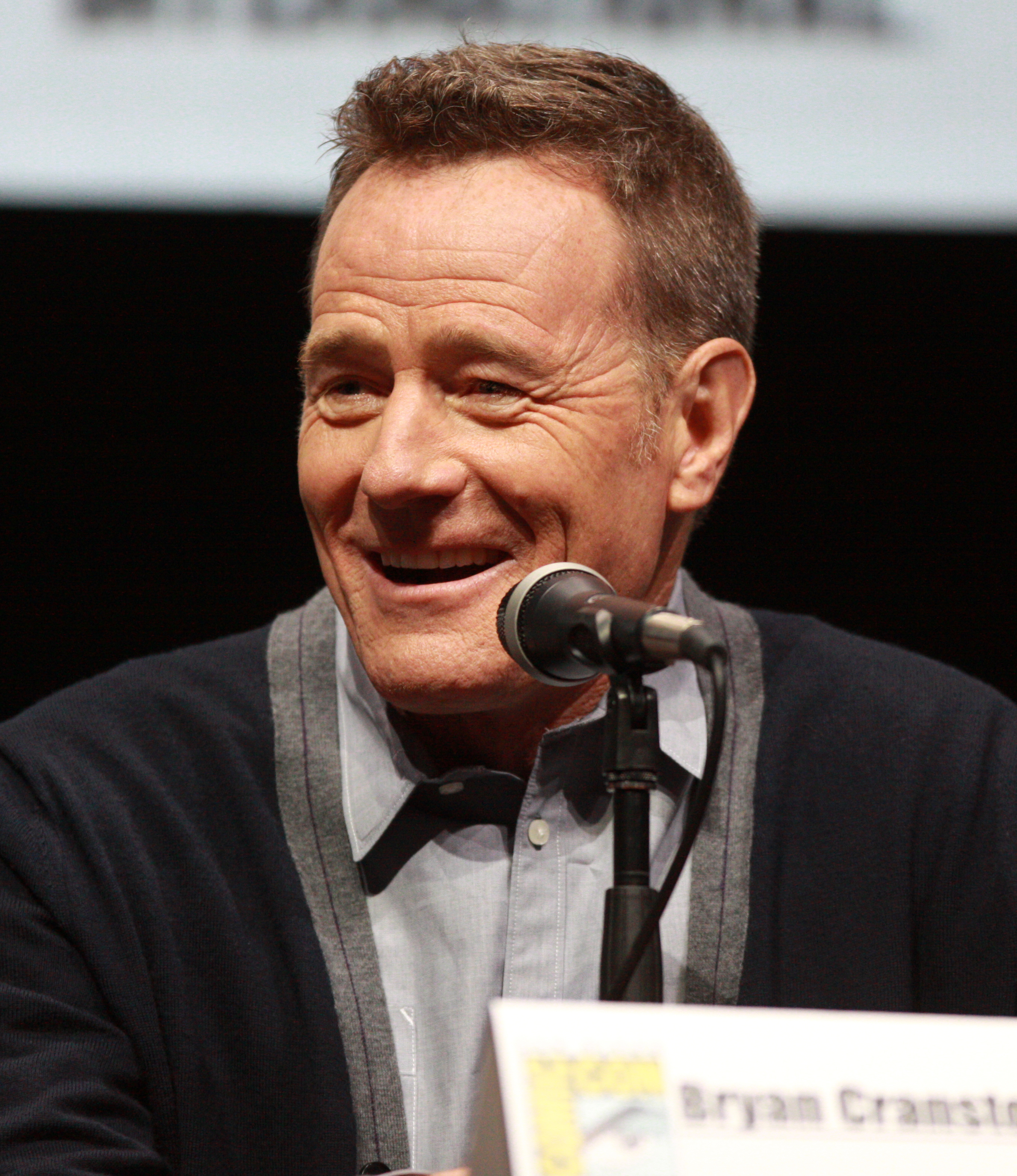
Bryan Cranston, Outstanding Performance by a Male Actor in a Miniseries or Television Movie winner

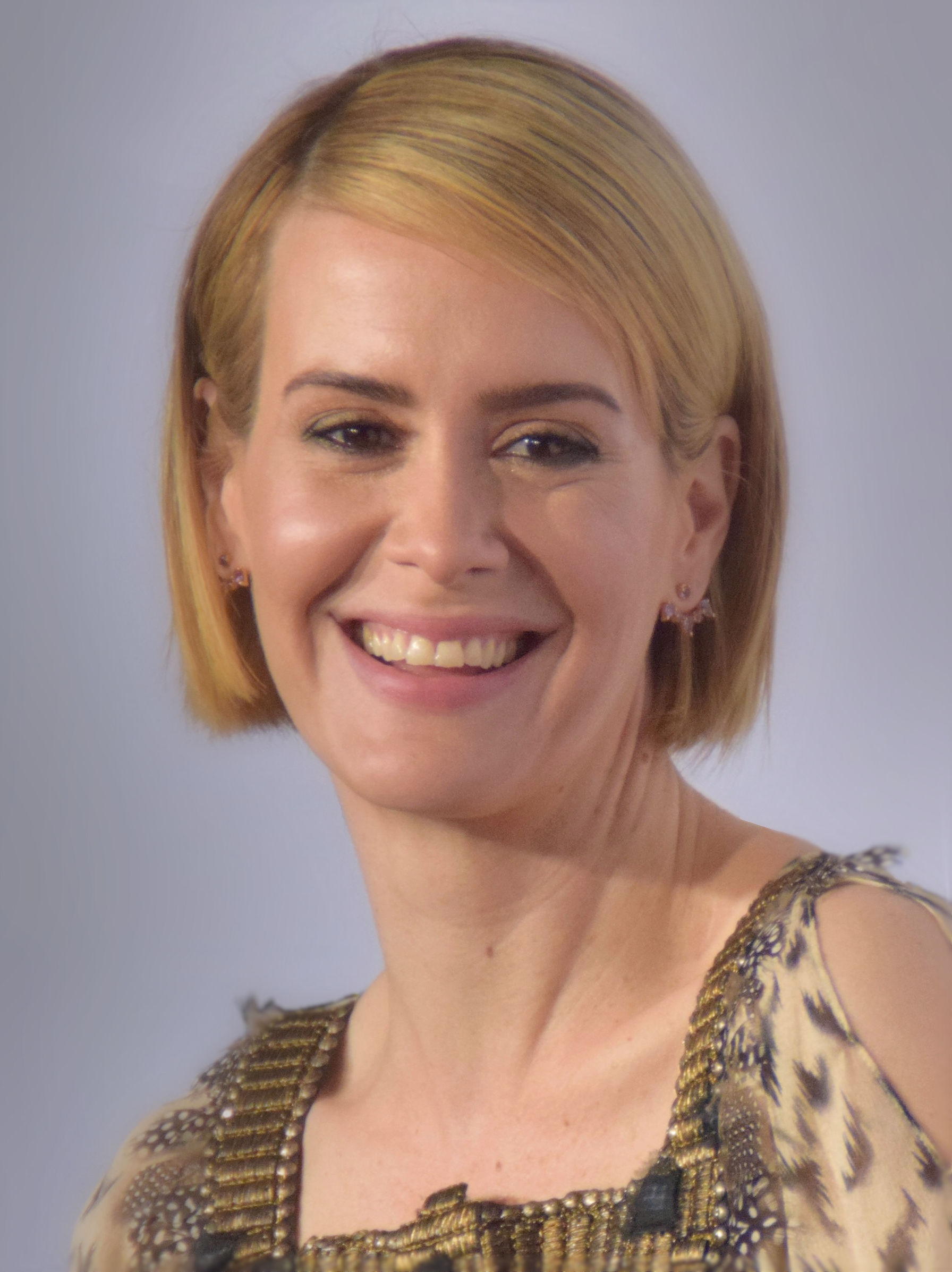
Sarah Paulson, Outstanding Performance by a Female Actor in a Miniseries or Television Movie winner

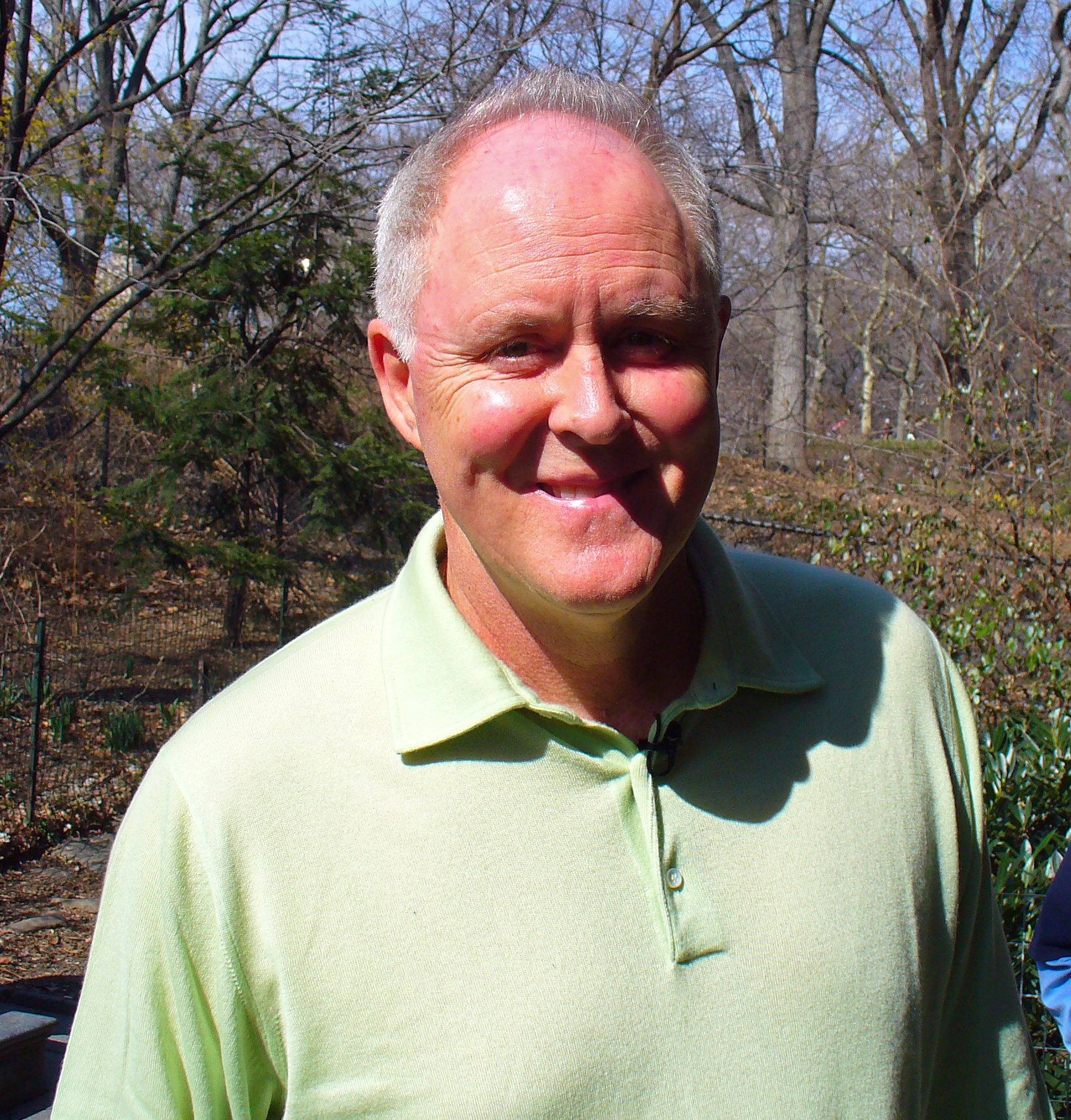
John Lithgow, Outstanding Performance by a Male Actor in a Drama Series winner

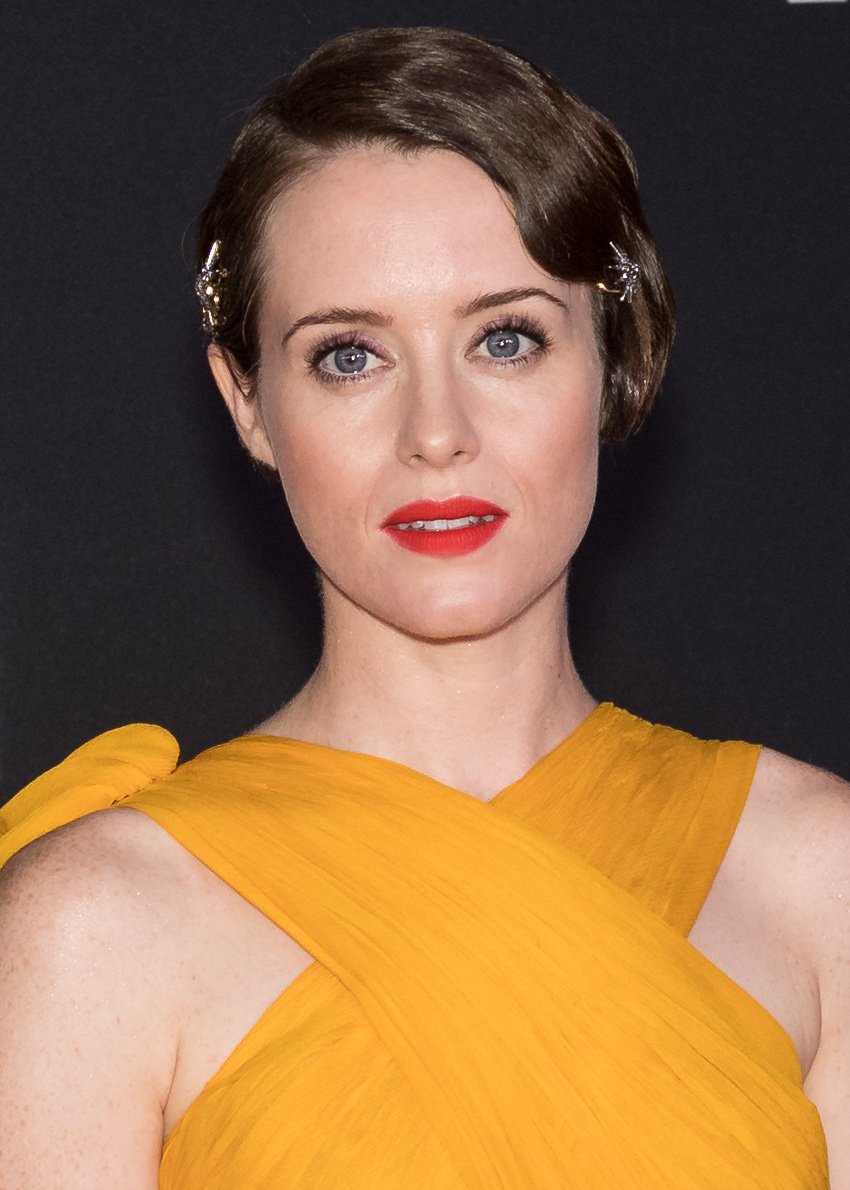
Claire Foy, Outstanding Performance by a Female Actor in a Drama Series winner

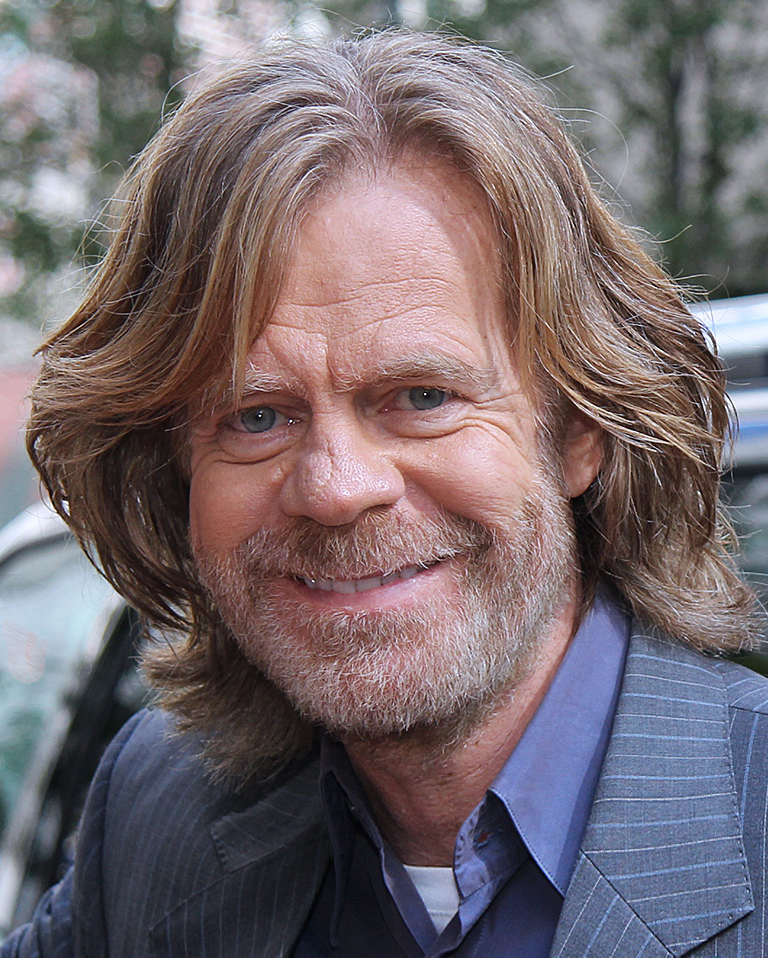
William H. Macy, Outstanding Performance by a Male Actor in a Comedy Series winner

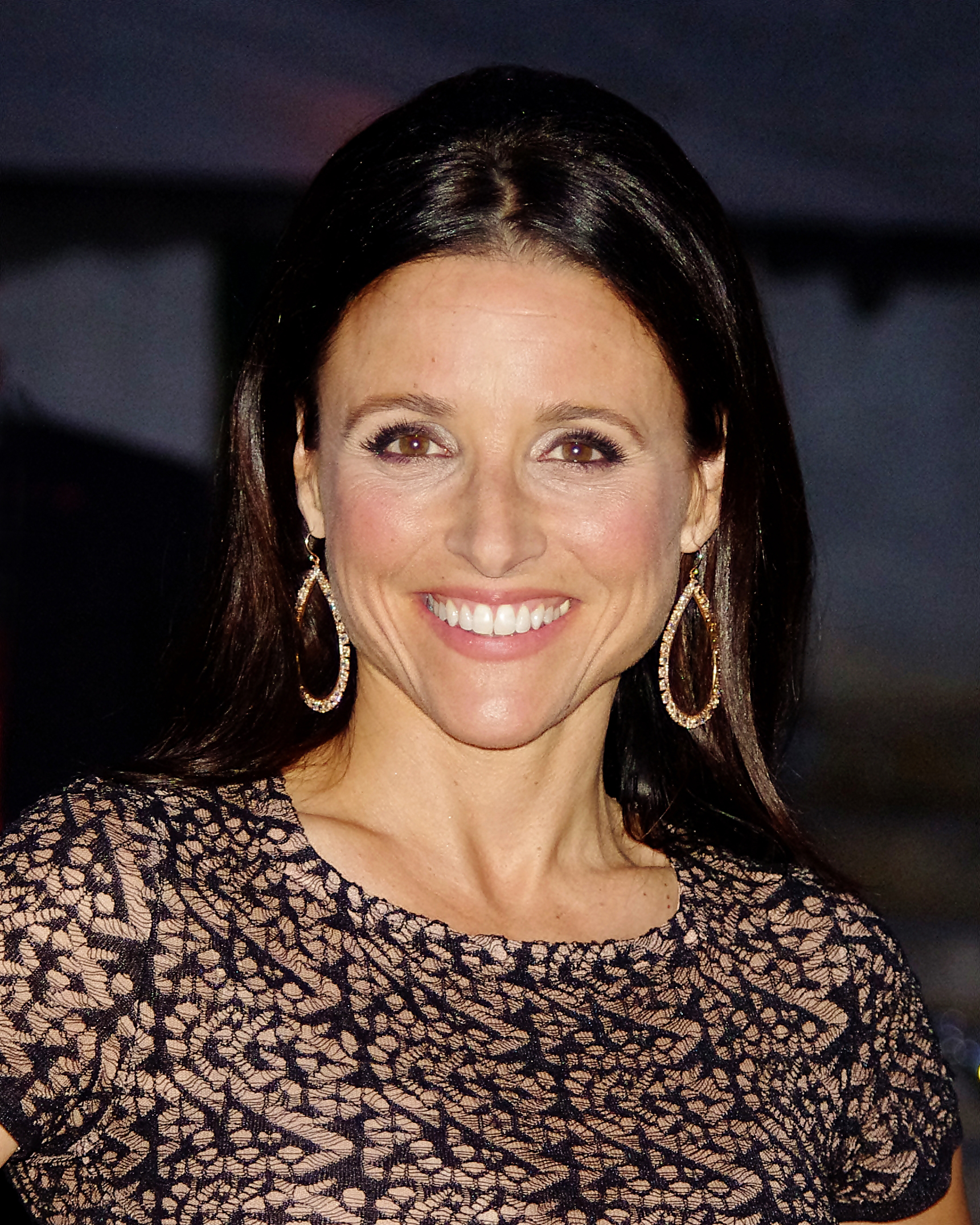
Julia Louis-Dreyfus, Outstanding Performance by a Female Actor in a Comedy Series winner

=== Film ===
Outstanding Performance by a Male Actor in a Leading Role	Outstanding Performance by a Female Actor in a Leading Role
**Denzel Washington – Fences as Troy Maxson**; Casey Affleck – Manchester by the Sea as Lee Chandler; Andrew Garfield – Hacksaw Ridge as Desmond T. Doss; Ryan Gosling – La La Land as Sebastian Wilder; Viggo Mortensen – Captain Fantastic as Ben Cash	**Emma Stone – La La Land as Mia Dolan**; Amy Adams – Arrival as Dr. Louise Banks; Emily Blunt – The Girl on the Train as Rachel Watson; Natalie Portman – Jackie as Jackie Kennedy; Meryl Streep – Florence Foster Jenkins as Florence Foster Jenkins
Outstanding Performance by a Male Actor in a Supporting Role	Outstanding Performance by a Female Actor in a Supporting Role
**Mahershala Ali – Moonlight as Juan**; Jeff Bridges – Hell or High Water as Marcus Hamilton; Hugh Grant – Florence Foster Jenkins as St. Clair Bayfield; Lucas Hedges – Manchester by the Sea as Patrick Chandler; Dev Patel – Lion as Saroo Brierley	**Viola Davis – Fences as Rose Maxson**; Naomie Harris – Moonlight as Paula; Nicole Kidman – Lion as Sue Brierley; Octavia Spencer – Hidden Figures as Dorothy Vaughan; Michelle Williams – Manchester by the Sea as Randi Chandler
Outstanding Performance by a Cast in a Motion Picture
**Hidden Figures – Mahershala Ali, Kevin Costner, Kirsten Dunst, Taraji P. Henson, Aldis Hodge, Janelle Monáe, Jim Parsons, Glen Powell and Octavia Spencer**; Captain Fantastic – Annalise Basso, Shree Crooks, Ann Dowd, Kathryn Hahn, Nicholas Hamilton, Samantha Isler, Frank Langella, George MacKay, Erin Moriarty, Viggo Mortensen, Missi Pyle, Charlie Shotwell and Steve Zahn; Fences – Jovan Adepo, Viola Davis, Stephen McKinley Henderson, Russell Hornsby, Saniyya Sidney, Denzel Washington and Mykelti Williamson; Manchester by the Sea – Casey Affleck, Kyle Chandler, Lucas Hedges, Gretchen Mol, Matthew Broderick and Michelle Williams; Moonlight – Mahershala Ali, Naomie Harris, André Holland, Jharrel Jerome, Janelle Monáe, Trevante Rhodes and Ashton Sanders
Outstanding Performance by a Stunt Ensemble in a Motion Picture
**Hacksaw Ridge**; Captain America: Civil War; Doctor Strange; Jason Bourne; Nocturnal Animals

=== Television ===
Outstanding Performance by a Male Actor in a Miniseries or Television Movie	Outstanding Performance by a Female Actor in a Miniseries or Television Movie
**Bryan Cranston – All the Way (HBO) as President Lyndon B. Johnson**; Riz Ahmed – The Night Of (HBO) as Nasir "Naz" Khan; Sterling K. Brown – The People v. O. J. Simpson: American Crime Story (FX) as Christopher Darden; John Turturro – The Night Of (HBO) as John Stone; Courtney B. Vance – The People v. O. J. Simpson: American Crime Story (FX) as Johnnie Cochran	**Sarah Paulson – The People v. O. J. Simpson: American Crime Story (FX) as Marcia Clark**; Bryce Dallas Howard – Black Mirror: "Nosedive" (Netflix) as Lacie Pound; Felicity Huffman – American Crime (ABC) as Leslie Graham; Audra McDonald – Lady Day at Emerson's Bar and Grill (HBO) as Billie Holiday; Kerry Washington – Confirmation (HBO) as Anita Hill
Outstanding Performance by a Male Actor in a Drama Series	Outstanding Performance by a Female Actor in a Drama Series
**John Lithgow – The Crown (Netflix) as Winston Churchill**; Sterling K. Brown – This Is Us (NBC) as Randall Pearson; Peter Dinklage – Game of Thrones (HBO) as Tyrion Lannister; Rami Malek – Mr. Robot (USA Network) as Elliot Alderson; Kevin Spacey – House of Cards (Netflix) as Francis Underwood	**Claire Foy – The Crown (Netflix) as Queen Elizabeth II**; Millie Bobby Brown – Stranger Things (Netflix) as Eleven; Thandiwe Newton – Westworld (HBO) as Maeve Millay; Winona Ryder – Stranger Things (Netflix) as Joyce Byers; Robin Wright – House of Cards (Netflix) as Claire Underwood
Outstanding Performance by a Male Actor in a Comedy Series	Outstanding Performance by a Female Actor in a Comedy Series
**William H. Macy – Shameless (Showtime) as Frank Gallagher**; Anthony Anderson – Black-ish (ABC) as Andre "Dre" Johnson, Sr.; Tituss Burgess – Unbreakable Kimmy Schmidt (Netflix) as Titus Andromedon; Ty Burrell – Modern Family (ABC) as Phil Dunphy; Jeffrey Tambor – Transparent (Amazon Prime Video) as Maura Pfefferman	**Julia Louis-Dreyfus – Veep (HBO) as Selina Meyer**; Uzo Aduba – Orange Is the New Black (Netflix) as Suzanne "Crazy Eyes" Warren; Jane Fonda – Grace and Frankie (Netflix) as Grace Hanson; Ellie Kemper – Unbreakable Kimmy Schmidt (Netflix) as Kimmy Schmidt; Lily Tomlin – Grace and Frankie (Netflix) as Frances "Frankie" Bergstein
Outstanding Performance by an Ensemble in a Drama Series
**Stranger Things (Netflix) – Millie Bobby Brown, Cara Buono, Joe Chrest, Natalia Dyer, David Harbour, Charlie Heaton, Joe Keery, Gaten Matarazzo, Caleb McLaughlin, Matthew Modine, Rob Morgan, John Paul Reynolds, Winona Ryder, Noah Schnapp, Mark Steger and Finn Wolfhard**; The Crown (Netflix) – Claire Foy, Clive Francis, Harry Hadden-Paton, Victoria Hamilton, Jared Harris, Daniel Ings, Billy Jenkins, Vanessa Kirby, John Lithgow, Lizzy McInnerny, Ben Miles, Jeremy Northam, Nicholas Rowe, Matt Smith, Pip Torrens and Harriet Walter; Downton Abbey (PBS) – Samantha Bond, Hugh Bonneville, Patrick Brennan, Laura Carmichael, Jim Carter, Raquel Cassidy, Paul Copley, Brendan Coyle, Michelle Dockery, Kevin Doyle, Michael Fox, Joanne Froggatt, Matthew Goode, Harry Hadden-Paton, Robert James-Collier, Sue Johnston, Allen Leech, Phyllis Logan, Elizabeth McGovern, Sophie McShera, Lesley Nicol, Douglas Reith, David Robb, Maggie Smith, Jeremy Swift, Howard Ward and Penelope Wilton; Game of Thrones (HBO) – Alfie Allen, Jacob Anderson, Dean-Charles Chapman, Emilia Clarke, Nikolaj Coster-Waldau, Liam Cunningham, Peter Dinklage, Nathalie Emmanuel, Kit Harington, Lena Headey, Conleth Hill, Kristofer Hivju, Michiel Huisman, Faye Marsay, Jonathan Pryce, Sophie Turner, Carice van Houten, Gemma Whelan and Maisie Williams; Westworld (HBO) – Ben Barnes, Ingrid Bolsø Berdal, Ed Harris, Luke Hemsworth, Anthony Hopkins, Sidse Babett Knudsen, James Marsden, Leonardo Nam, Thandiwe Newton, Talulah Riley, Rodrigo Santoro, Angela Sarafyan, Jimmi Simpson, Ptolemy Slocum, Evan Rachel Wood, Shannon Woodward and Jeffrey Wright
Outstanding Performance by an Ensemble in a Comedy Series
**Orange Is the New Black (Netflix) – Uzo Aduba, Alan Aisenberg, Danielle Brooks, Blair Brown, Jackie Cruz, Lea DeLaria, Beth Dover, Kimiko Glenn, Annie Golden, Laura Gómez, Diane Guerrero, Michael Harney, Brad William Henke, Vicky Jeudy, Julie Lake, Selenis Leyva, Natasha Lyonne, Taryn Manning, James McMenamin, Adrienne C. Moore, Kate Mulgrew, Emma Myles, Matt Peters, Lori Petty, Jessica Pimentel, Dascha Polanco, Laura Prepon, Jolene Purdy, Elizabeth Rodriguez, Nick Sandow, Abigail Savage, Taylor Schilling, Constance Shulman, Dale Soules, Yael Stone, Lin Tucci and Samira Wiley**; The Big Bang Theory (CBS) – Mayim Bialik, Kaley Cuoco, Johnny Galecki, Simon Helberg, Kunal Nayyar, Jim Parsons and Melissa Rauch; Black-ish (ABC) – Anthony Anderson, Miles Brown, Deon Cole, Laurence Fishburne, Jenifer Lewis, Peter Mackenzie, Marsai Martin, Jeff Meacham, Tracee Ellis Ross, Marcus Scribner and Yara Shahidi; Modern Family (ABC) – Aubrey Anderson-Emmons, Julie Bowen, Ty Burrell, Jesse Tyler Ferguson, Nolan Gould, Sarah Hyland, Jeremy Maguire, Ed O'Neill, Rico Rodriguez, Eric Stonestreet, Sofía Vergara and Ariel Winter; Veep (HBO) – Dan Bakkedahl, Sufe Bradshaw, Anna Chlumsky, Gary Cole, Kevin Dunn, Clea Duvall, Nelson Franklin, Tony Hale, Hugh Laurie, Julia Louis-Dreyfus, Sam Richardson, Reid Scott, Timothy Simons, John Slattery, Sarah Sutherland, Matt Walsh and Wayne Wilderson
Outstanding Performance by a Stunt Ensemble in a Television Series
**Game of Thrones (HBO)**; Daredevil (Netflix); Luke Cage (Netflix); The Walking Dead (AMC); Westworld (HBO)

=== Screen Actors Guild Life Achievement Award ===
- Lily Tomlin

== Multiple nominations ==
=== Film ===
Nominations	Film
4	Manchester by the Sea
3	Fences
3	Moonlight
2	Captain Fantastic
2	Florence Foster Jenkins
2	Hacksaw Ridge
2	Hidden Figures
2	La La Land
2	Lion

=== Television ===
Nominations	Program
3	The Crown
3	Game of Thrones
3	The People v. O. J. Simpson: American Crime Story
3	Stranger Things
3	Westworld
2	Black-ish
2	Grace and Frankie
2	House of Cards
2	Modern Family
2	The Night Of
2	Orange Is the New Black
2	Unbreakable Kimmy Schmidt
2	Veep

== Multiple wins ==
=== Film ===
Wins	Film
2	Fences

=== Television ===
Wins	Program
2	The Crown

== In Memoriam ==
The segment honors the following who died in 2016:

- Ken Howard
- William Schallert
- Patty Duke
- Jack Riley
- Nancy Reagan
- Bill Nunn
- Alan Young
- Anton Yelchin
- Alexis Arquette
- Anne Jackson
- Kenny Baker
- Hugh O'Brian
- Florence Henderson
- Robert Vaughn
- William Christopher
- George Kennedy
- David Huddleston
- Doris Roberts
- Larry Drake
- Jon Polito
- Theresa Saldana
- Garry Shandling
- John McMartin
- Thomas Mikal Ford
- Robert Horton
- Beth Howland
- Ron Glass
- Fyvush Finkel
- Steven Hill
- Richard Libertini
- Abe Vigoda
- Dan Haggerty
- Prince
- Alan Thicke
- Zsa Zsa Gabor
- Garry Marshall
- Gene Wilder
- Mary Tyler Moore
- Carrie Fisher
- Debbie Reynolds

== Presenters ==
Sources:

- Ashton Kutcher
- Dolly Parton
- John Legend
- Gina Rodriguez
- Taraji P. Henson
- Octavia Spencer
- Janelle Monáe
- Naomie Harris
- Lucas Hedges
- Taraji P. Henson
- Brie Larson
- Janelle Monáe
- Viggo Mortensen
- Octavia Spencer
- Riz Ahmed
- Viola Davis
- Michelle Dockery
- Kathryn Hahn
- Salma Hayek
- Jonah Hill
- Kate Hudson
- Nicole Kidman
- Ashton Kutcher
- John Legend
- James Marsden
- Gina Rodriguez
- Denzel Washington
- Millie Bobby Brown
- Sophia Bush
- Gabrielle Carteris
- Common
- Gaten Matarazzo
- Caleb McLaughlin
- Alia Shawkat
- Finn Wolfhard
- Steven Yeun

* Jane Fonda was scheduled but did not appear due to suffering from a throat infection.
