= 2018 MTV Movie & TV Awards =

American awards show

- Date: June 18, 2018 (airing) June 16, 2018 (taping)
- Location: Barker Hangar, Santa Monica, California
- Country: United States
- Hosted by: Tiffany Haddish

Highlights
- Most awards: Black Panther (4); Stranger Things (4)
- Most nominations: Black Panther (7); Stranger Things (7)

Television/radio coverage
- Network: MTV, MTV2, VH1, CMT, BET, MTV Classic, TV Land, Comedy Central, Logo TV and BET Her
- Produced by: Tenth Planet
- Directed by: Joel Gallen

The 2018 MTV Movie & TV Awards was held on June 16, 2018, from the Barker Hangar in Santa Monica, California, U.S. and was broadcast on June 18, 2018. Similar to the 2016 MTV Movie Awards, the event was not aired live and was pre-recorded on June 16 prior to its June 18 broadcast date. It was the 27th edition of the awards and the second to jointly honor movies and television. The ceremony was hosted by Tiffany Haddish.

== Performers ==
MTV announced the first few performers on May 23, 2018.

- Chloe x Halle – "Warrior"/"The Kids Are Alright"
- DJ Mustard and Nick Jonas – "Anywhere"

== Presenters ==
The first few presenters were revealed on May 23, 2018, with the performers.

- Michael B. Jordan and Mila Kunis – Presented "Best Scene Stealer"
- Lil Rel Howery & Kyrie Irving – Presented "Best Frightened Performance"
- Olivia Munn and Zazie Beetz – Presented "Best Hero"
- Francia Raisa and Yara Shahidi – Introduced Chloe x Halle
- Alisha Boe, Dylan Minnette, Katherine Langford & Miles Heizer – Presented "Best Kiss"
- Kristen Bell and Seth Rogen – Presented "Best Comedic Performance"
- Charlamagne tha God, Halsey & Lil Yachty – Presented "Best Reality Series"
- Lakeith Stanfield & Tessa Thompson – Presented "Best Villain"
- Alison Brie and Betty Gilpin – Introduced DJ Mustard and Nick Jonas
- Common – Presented "Trailblazer Award" to Lena Waithe
- Cast of Jersey Shore – Presented "Best On-Screen Team"
  (Michael Sorrentino, Vinny Guadagnino, Paul DelVecchio, Deena Nicole Cortese and Ronnie Ortiz-Magro)
- Camila Mendes, Madelaine Petsch & Lili Reinhart – Presented "Best Performance in a Show"
- Bryce Dallas Howard & Aubrey Plaza – Presented "Generation Award" to Chris Pratt
- Zendaya – Presented "Best Performance in a Movie"
- Mandy Moore and Amandla Stenberg – Presented "Best Show"
- Lady Gaga – Presented "Best Movie"

== Winners and nominees ==
The full list of nominees was announced on May 3, 2018. Winners are listed first, in bold.

Best Movie (Presented by Toyota)	Best Show
**Black Panther**; Avengers: Infinity War; Girls Trip; It; Wonder Woman	**Stranger Things**; 13 Reasons Why; Game of Thrones; Grown-ish; Riverdale
Best Performance in a Movie	Best Performance in a Show
**Chadwick Boseman – Black Panther**; Timothée Chalamet – Call Me by Your Name; Ansel Elgort – Baby Driver; Daisy Ridley – Star Wars: The Last Jedi; Saoirse Ronan – Lady Bird	**Millie Bobby Brown – Stranger Things**; Darren Criss – The Assassination of Gianni Versace: American Crime Story; Katherine Langford – 13 Reasons Why; Issa Rae – Insecure; Maisie Williams – Game of Thrones
Best Comedic Performance	Best Hero
**Tiffany Haddish – Girls Trip**; Jack Black – Jumanji: Welcome to the Jungle; Dan Levy – Schitt's Creek; Kate McKinnon – Saturday Night Live; Amy Schumer – I Feel Pretty	**Chadwick Boseman – Black Panther**; Emilia Clarke – Game of Thrones; Gal Gadot – Wonder Woman; Grant Gustin – The Flash; Daisy Ridley – Star Wars: The Last Jedi
Best Villain	Best Kiss
**Michael B. Jordan – Black Panther**; Josh Brolin – Avengers: Infinity War; Adam Driver – Star Wars: The Last Jedi; Aubrey Plaza – Legion; Bill Skarsgård – It	**Nick Robinson and Keiynan Lonsdale – Love, Simon**; Gina Rodriguez and Justin Baldoni – Jane the Virgin; Olivia Cooke and Tye Sheridan – Ready Player One; KJ Apa and Camila Mendes – Riverdale; Finn Wolfhard and Millie Bobby Brown – Stranger Things
Most Frightened Performance	Best Reality Series/Franchise
**Noah Schnapp – Stranger Things**; Talitha Bateman – Annabelle: Creation; Emily Blunt – A Quiet Place; Sophia Lillis – It; Cristin Milioti – Black Mirror	**The Kardashians**; Love & Hip Hop; The Real Housewives; RuPaul's Drag Race; Vanderpump Rules
Scene Stealer	Best On-Screen Team
**Madelaine Petsch – Riverdale**; Tiffany Haddish – Girls Trip; Dacre Montgomery – Stranger Things; Taika Waititi – Thor: Ragnarok; Letitia Wright – Black Panther	**Finn Wolfhard, Sophia Lillis, Jaeden Lieberher, Jack Dylan Grazer, Wyatt Oleff, Jeremy Ray Taylor and Chosen Jacobs – It**; Chadwick Boseman, Lupita Nyong'o, Danai Gurira and Letitia Wright – Black Panther; Dwayne Johnson, Kevin Hart, Jack Black, Karen Gillan and Nick Jonas – Jumanji: Welcome to the Jungle; Tye Sheridan, Olivia Cooke, all of the Overlook Hotel characters, Philip Zhao, Win Morisaki and Lena Waithe – Ready Player One; Gaten Matarazzo, Finn Wolfhard, Caleb McLaughlin, Noah Schnapp and Sadie Sink – Stranger Things
Best Music Documentary	Best Fight
**Lady Gaga – Gaga: Five Foot Two**; Diddy – Can’t Stop, Won’t Stop: A Bad Boy Story; Demi Lovato – Demi Lovato: Simply Complicated; JAY-Z – Jay-Z's "Footnotes for 4:44"; Dr. Dre and Jimmy Iovine – The Defiant Ones	**Gal Gadot vs. German Soldiers – Wonder Woman**; Charlize Theron vs. Daniel Hargrave & Greg Rementer – Atomic Blonde; Scarlett Johansson, Danai Gurira, & Elizabeth Olsen vs. Carrie Coon – Avengers: Infinity War; Chadwick Boseman vs. Winston Duke – Black Panther; Mark Ruffalo vs. Chris Hemsworth – Thor: Ragnarok
Best Musical Moment
**Mike and Eleven dance to "Every Breath You Take" – Stranger Things**; Cast performs "Freedom" – Black-ish; Elio crying through the end credits – Call Me By Your Name; Dance Battle – Girls Trip; "I Wanna Dance With Somebody (Who Loves Me)" dream sequence – Love, Simon; Cast performs "A Night We'll Never Forget" – Riverdale; Phillip and Anne sing "Rewrite the Stars" – The Greatest Showman; Kate sings "Landslide" – This Is Us

=== MTV Generation Award ===
- Chris Pratt

=== MTV Trailblazer Award ===
- Lena Waithe

== Multiple nominations ==
=== Film ===
The following movies received multiple nominations:

- Seven – Black Panther
- Four – It, Girls Trip
- Three – Avengers: Infinity War, Star Wars: The Last Jedi, Wonder Woman
- Two – Jumanji: Welcome to the Jungle, Ready Player One, Thor: Ragnarok, Call Me By Your Name, Love, Simon

=== Television ===
The following television series received multiple nominations:

- Seven – Stranger Things
- Four – Riverdale
- Three – Game of Thrones
- Two – 13 Reasons Why
