= Millie Bobby Brown =

British actress and film producer (born 2004)

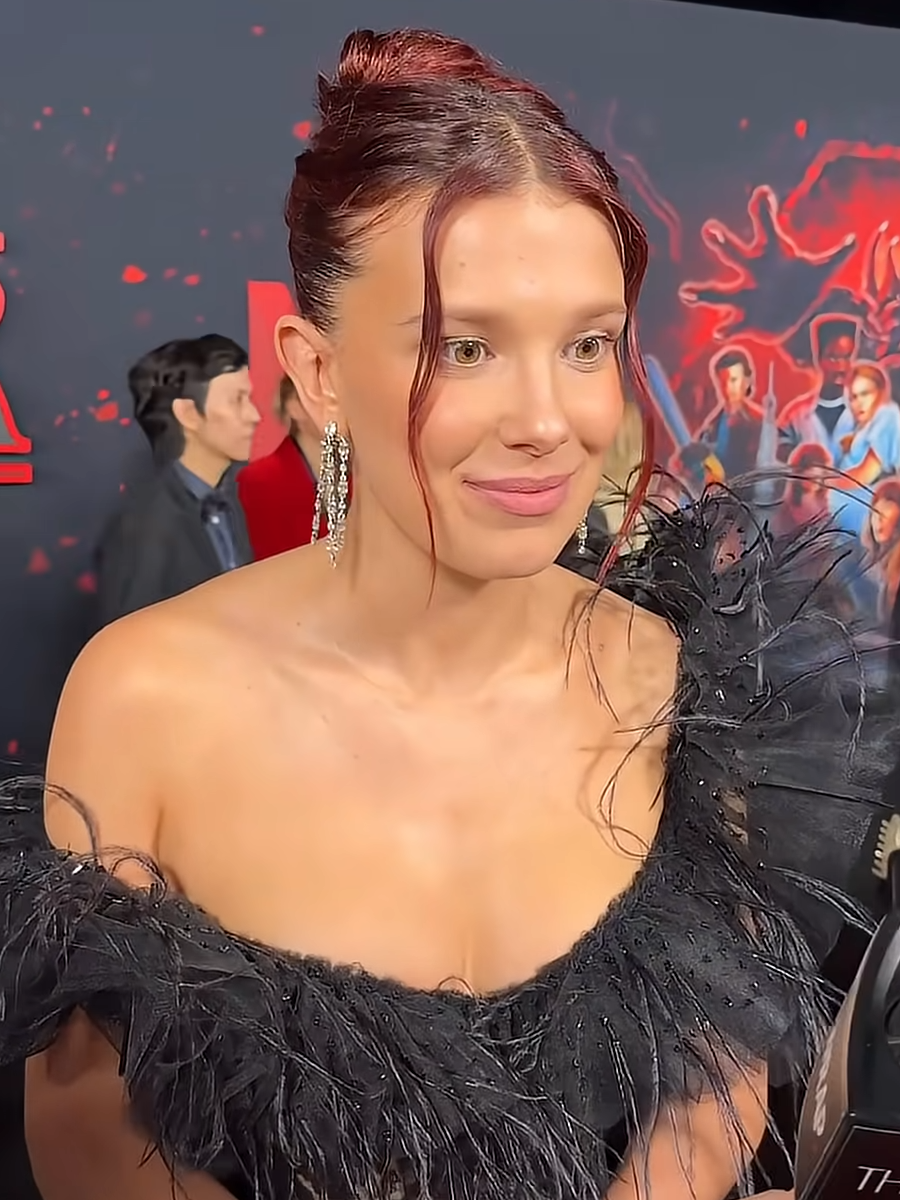
- Brown in 2025
- Born: Millie Bonnie Brown; 19 February 2004 (age 22); Marbella, Spain
- Citizenship: United Kingdom
- Occupations: Actress; film producer
- Years active: 2013–present
- Spouse: Jake Bongiovi (m. 2024)
- Children: 2
- Relatives: Jon Bon Jovi (father-in-law)

Millie Bonnie Bongiovi (née Brown; born 19 February 2004), known professionally as Millie Bobby Brown, is a British actress and film producer. She gained international recognition for playing Eleven in the Netflix science fiction series Stranger Things (2016–2025), for which she received nominations for two Primetime Emmy Awards. In 2018, Brown was featured in the Time 100 list of the world's most influential people. She was the youngest person ever appointed as a UNICEF Goodwill Ambassador.

Brown starred in the film Godzilla: King of the Monsters (2019) and its sequel Godzilla vs. Kong (2021). She also starred in and produced the Netflix films Enola Holmes (2020), Enola Holmes 2 (2022), Damsel (2024), The Electric State (2025), and Enola Holmes 3 (2026).

== Early life ==
Millie Bonnie Brown was born on 19 February 2004, at HC Marbella International Hospital in Marbella, Andalusia, Spain. She is the third of four children born to British parents Kelly and Robert Brown, an estate agent. She has an older sister, Paige, and brother, Charlie, and a younger sister, Ava. Her middle name is "Bonnie", but "Bobby" became the stage name. Brown was born with partial hearing loss in her left ear and gradually lost all hearing in that ear over several years. At the age of four, she moved with her family back to England, settling in Bournemouth, Dorset. The family moved to Orlando, Florida, when she was eight. Brown has said that she grew up with "no money", and the financial insecurity of her upbringing had affected her relationship with money in adulthood, even after achieving success through Stranger Things as a child actress. Due to growing up in the United States, Brown naturally oscillates between an American accent and her native British accent depending on her environment.

== Career ==
=== 2013–2017: Early roles and Stranger Things ===
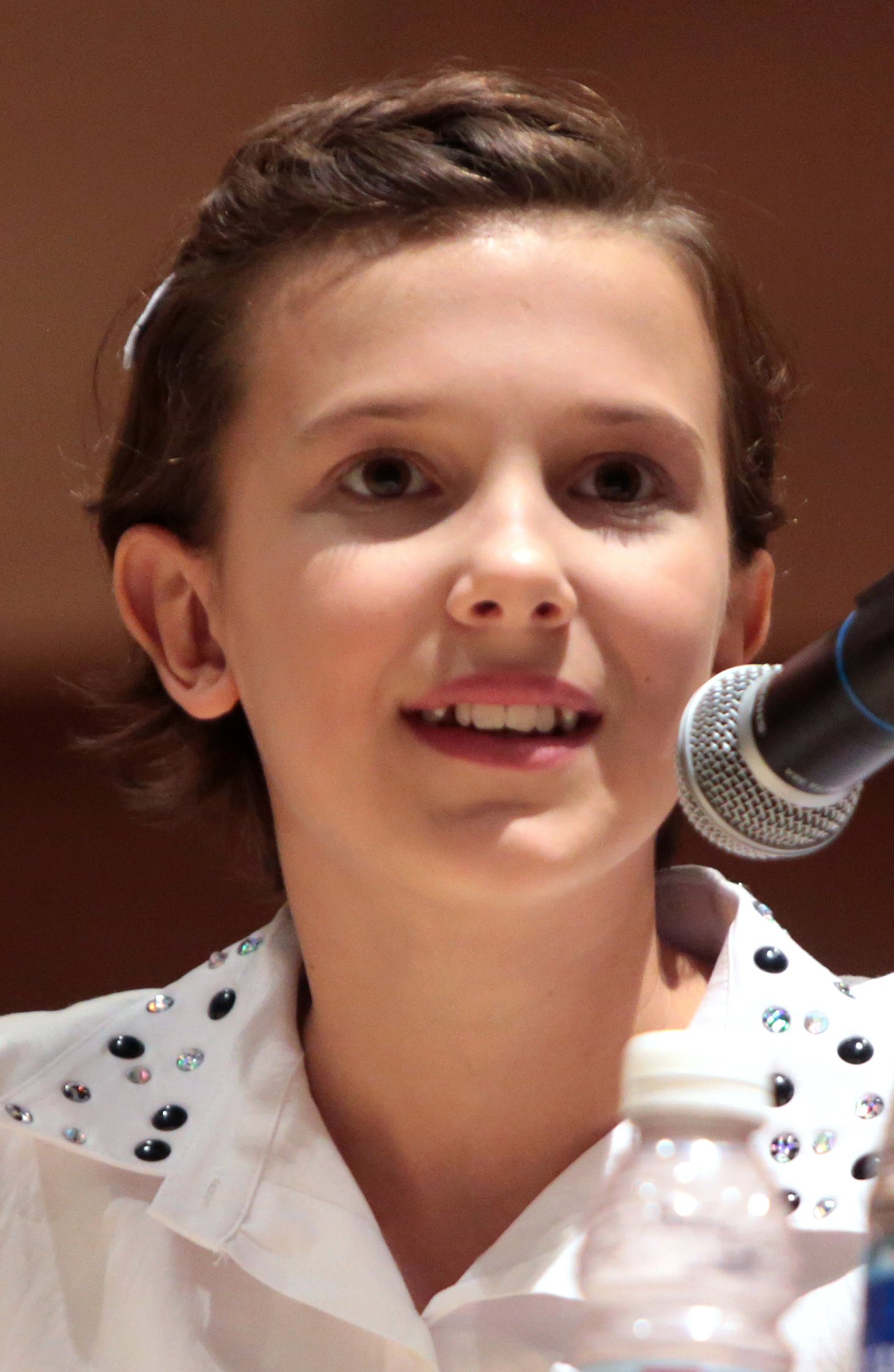
Brown in 2016

In 2013, Brown made her acting debut as a guest star in the ABC fantasy drama series Once Upon a Time in Wonderland, a spin-off of Once Upon a Time, portraying the role of Young Alice. In 2014, she had a starring role in the BBC America paranormal drama-thriller series Intruders as Madison O'Donnell. She made guest appearances in the CBS police procedural drama NCIS, the ABC sitcom Modern Family and the ABC medical drama series Grey's Anatomy. Those roles weren't enough to keep her family in the U.S. and they moved back to England to stay with her aunt.

In 2016, she auditioned for Lady Lyanna Mormont in Game of Thrones but did not get the role. Then, Brown was cast to play Eleven in the Netflix science fiction horror series Stranger Things. She received critical praise for her performance and she was nominated for the Screen Actors Guild Award for Outstanding Performance by a Female Actor in a Drama Series and the Primetime Emmy Award for Outstanding Supporting Actress in a Drama Series. She then won the Screen Actors Guild Award for Outstanding Performance by an Ensemble in a Drama Series with her co-stars and won the 43rd Saturn Award for Best Performance by a Younger Actor in a Television Series. For her role as Eleven in the second season of Stranger Things, she received her second nominations for a Screen Actors Guild Award and a Primetime Emmy Award in 2018.

In November 2016, Brown starred in the music video for Sigma and Birdy's single "Find Me". Since November 2016, she has appeared in commercial advertisements for investment and financial service company Citigroup. In January 2017, she made her modelling debut in Calvin Klein's "By Appointment" campaign. The following month, she was signed to the agency IMG Models. Brown appeared in the advertisement campaign of the Italian brand Moncler in the summer of 2018. Brown has also made appearances on the cover of Vogue.

=== 2018–present ===
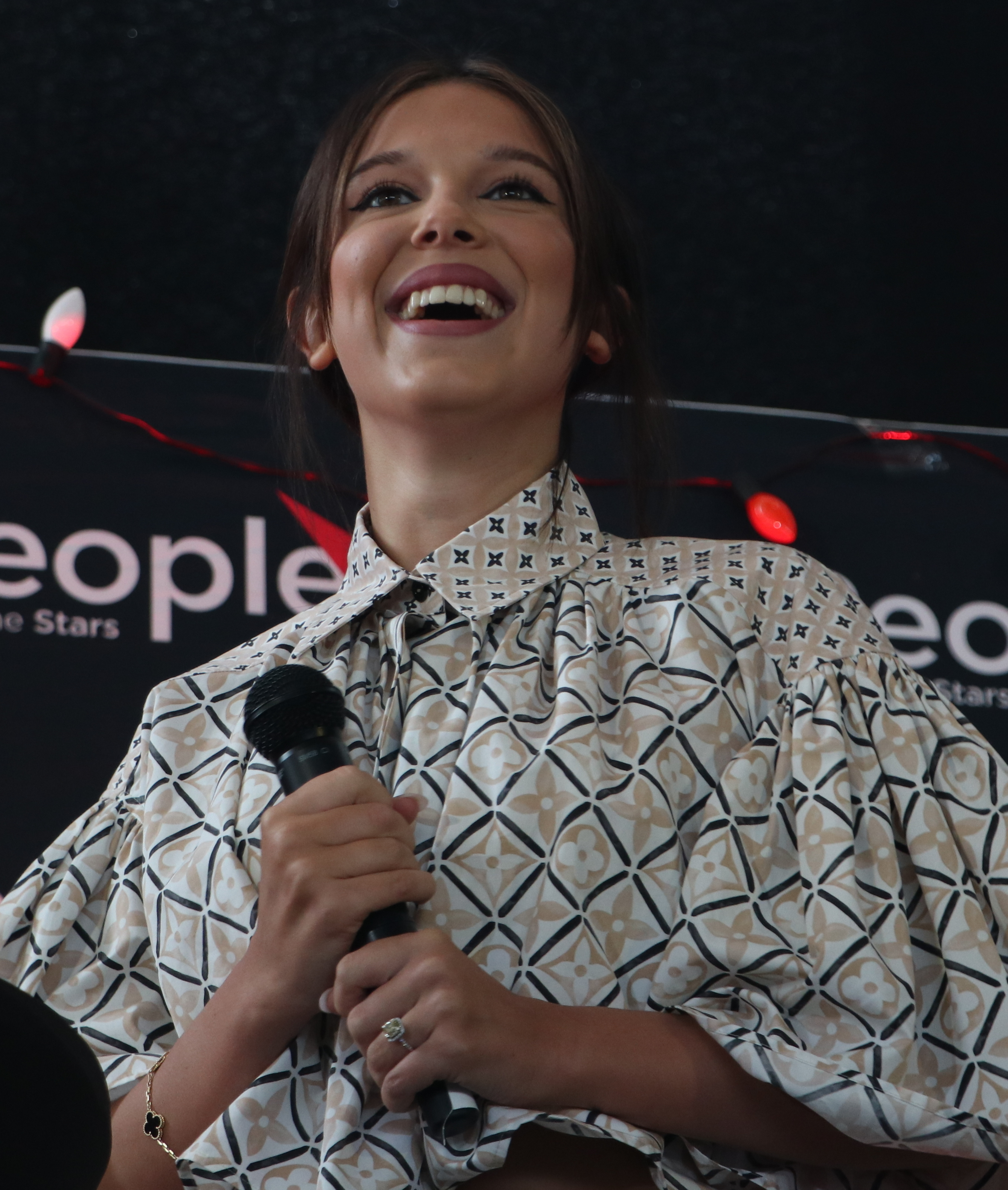
Brown in 2023

Brown was chosen to voice in the Darren Aronofsky-produced virtual reality experience Spheres: Songs of Spacetime. In 2018, she was named one of the 100 most influential people in the world by Time, becoming the youngest person to be included in the list. Additionally, she was named by Time magazine as one of the most influential teens of 2017 and 2018. That year, she became the youngest person ever to be appointed a UNICEF Goodwill Ambassador. EA Games announced that Brown collaborated with The Sims 4 programmers to feature in the Sims 4 Positivity Challenge. In 2018, The Hollywood Reporter ranked Brown as amongst Hollywood's top thirty stars under age eighteen.

Brown made her feature film debut in 2019 in Godzilla: King of the Monsters, the sequel to the 2014 film Godzilla. She reprised her role in the next sequel, Godzilla vs. Kong (2021). She became the ambassador of UEFA's Together #WePlayStrong campaign. In 2019, Brown launched Florence by Mills, her own beauty product line. It is available at UK pharmacy Boots, Walmart in the United States and Shoppers Drug Mart in Canada. In 2020, Brown starred in and produced the film adaptation of The Enola Holmes Mysteries, and later reprised the role in the 2022 sequel, Enola Holmes 2. According to Variety, she earned $10 million for the role, emerging as one of the year's highest paid actresses in Hollywood. That year, she was also made an ambassador of the fashion brand Louis Vuitton. Brown released her debut novel, Nineteen Steps, based on her own family history, in September 2023. The novel is described as an "epic story of love, loss and secrets".

In 2024, Brown starred in and executive produced the fantasy film Damsel for Netflix, directed by Spanish filmmaker Juan Carlos Fresnadillo based on a screenplay by Dan Mazeau. In 2025, she starred in the Russo brothers's The Electric State, an adaptation of Simon Stålenhag's graphic novel of the same name.

In July 2025, Brown and Gabriel LaBelle were set to star in the Netflix romantic comedy film Just Picture It. In 2026, she reprised her role in Enola Holmes 3.

In November 2026, it was announced that Brown would star in and produce the comedy film Non-Refundable, directed by Paul Briganti and co-starring Jack Innanen.

== Advocacy ==
Brown has engaged in activism with the UNICEF Goodwill Ambassador and serves in prominent global ambassador and rescue roles. She was the youngest person ever appointed as a UNICEF Goodwill Ambassador at age 14 in 2018. She particularly focusing on bullying, online cyberbullying, mental health, climate change, environmental sustainability, animal rights, gun control, children's rights and educational rights. Brown delivered anti-bullying speeches at the 2018 MTV Movie & TV Awards and the 2019 United Nations World Children's Day event. Brown cites actress and humanitarian Audrey Hepburn as her style icon and personal hero.

Brown has publicly supported stricter gun control and actively advocated against gun violence. She honored the victims of the Marjory Stoneman Douglas High School shooting and supported the March for Our Lives movement by dedicated the movement on her Favorite TV Actress winning acceptance speech and wearing a custom Calvin Klein denim outfit with the names of the victims on the back at the 2018 Nickelodeon Kids' Choice Awards.

Brown signed up to be cast in Godzilla: King of the Monsters for her passion on animal rights and environmentalism as the film itself explore heavy real-world themes like animal conservation, environmental protection, and climate change. In 2020, she partnered with Samsung to advocate for greener technology and sustainable futures to empower young people to tackle widespread environmental and social issues through micro-actions within their own communities.

In March 2025, Brown visited a school in São Paulo, Brazil to talked with teenage girls of women’s rights and education in Brazil. Some of these include girls’ experiences with gender-based violence, school dropout, period poverty, and limited access to job opportunities.

Brown co-founded the fostering initiative Joey's Friends and uses microchip scanners to help reunite lost pets or take in abandoned animals. She has turned her rural property in Georgia into an active animal rescue sanctuary housing over 60 animals.

== Business ventures ==
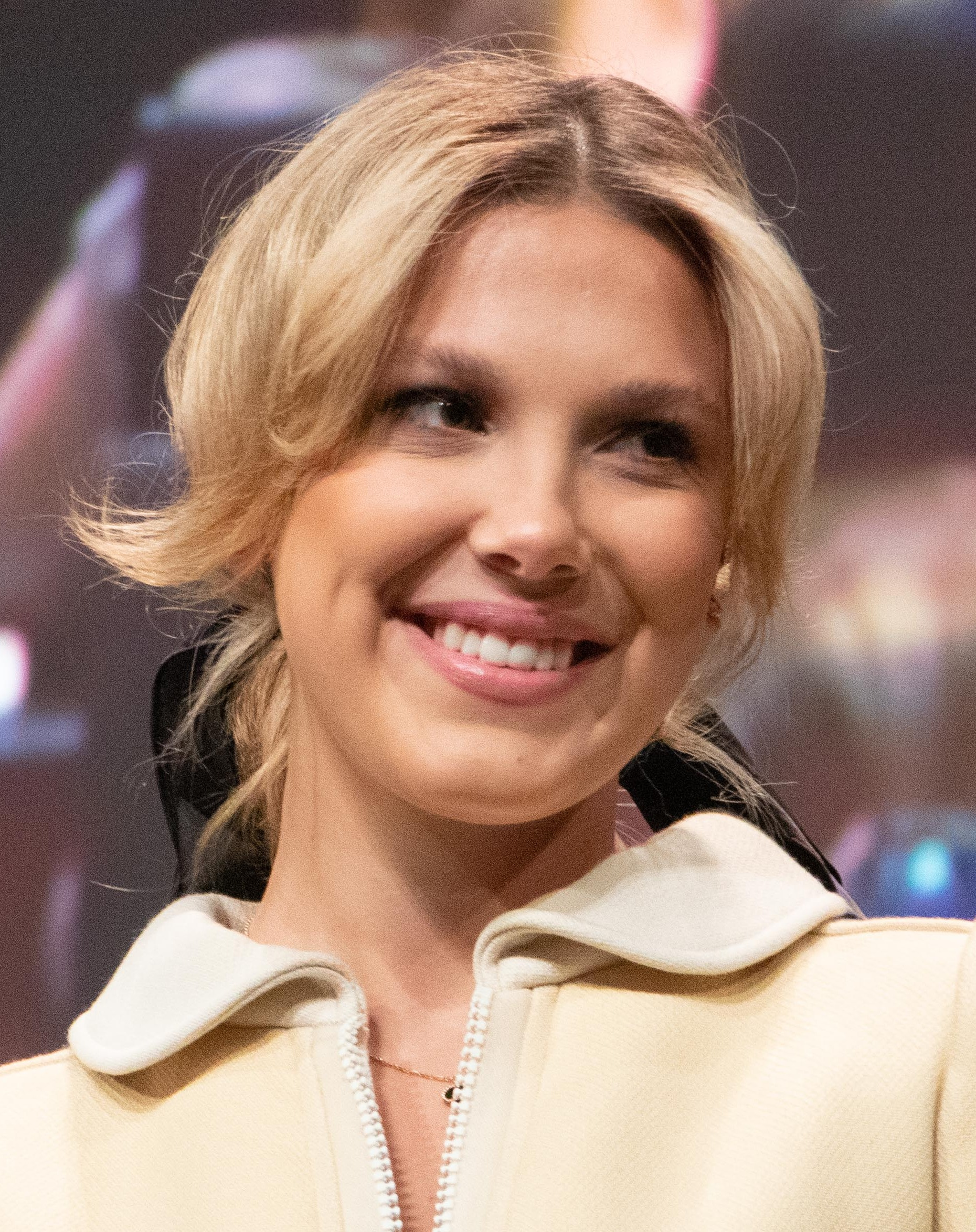
Brown in 2022

In August 2019, Brown launched her own cosmetics and fashion brand, Florence by Mills. The brand has been marketed toward Gen Z adolescent girls, and the products are intended to fit young people's skin.

She collaborated with Converse called "Millie By You", which launched on 11 July 2019. This was a customizable collection featuring classic Chuck Taylor styles with designs inspired by her love for the ocean and whales. In late 2019, she released a second Converse collaboration, also called "Millie By You", that included three new sneakers inspired by her love of DIY crafting.

Brown then became the face of Pandora's new Pandora Me collection in October 2019. The brand announced a two-year partnership with Brown, who helped promote the line of customizable charms, bracelets, and earrings focused on self-expression. She also hosted "Pandora Me Charm Academy" events to celebrate the collection.

In early 2020, she collaborated with Vogue Eyewear to co-design a collection of sunglasses and eyeglasses inspired by the 1990s, her travels, and her personal aesthetic. Key features included pastel colors, interesting shapes, and '90s retro-chic materials. Some models came with a unique crossbody pouch.

Brown worked with Chips Ahoy on cookies inspired by Stranger Things as part of the promotion for the series' fifth season in 2025.

== Media image ==
Brown has been dubbed a "Stream Queen" by some media outlets due to her predominantly appearing in content originally released on streaming services, mainly Netflix. Louis Chilton of The Independent wrote that while actors were often segregated based on medium such as film or television, "as the money and creative prestige migrated to television, the line between movie stars and TV actors has become more porous, and it was into this amorphous environment that streaming was born – meaning that there's never really been such a thing as a 'streaming actor'. Until Brown, that is."

== Personal life ==
Brown came into the public eye at age 12 after being cast in Stranger Things. At age 14, memes using homophobic quotes that were falsely attributed to Brown began circulating on social media, which Brown stated was one of the reasons she eventually deactivated her Twitter. In addition to online bullying, she has also faced social media users and articles sexualising her. In response, Brown captioned a 2020 Instagram post on her 16th birthday with the following comment: "There are moments I get frustrated from the inaccuracy, inappropriate comments, sexualisation and unnecessary insults that have ultimately resulted in pain and insecurity for me." After Brown turned 18 in February 2022, her social media profiles began to be flooded by sexually explicit material from users.

In 2018, Brown was in a relationship with social media personality and singer Jacob Sartorius. She briefly dated model Romeo Beckham from late 2018 to early 2019, rugby player Joseph Robinson in early-mid 2019 to mid 2020 and TikTok star Hunter Ecimovic in late 2020 to early 2021.

In 2021, Brown began a relationship with actor Jake Bongiovi. In April 2023, she announced their engagement. On 27 May 2024, People reported that the couple had married in a private ceremony the previous weekend. Brown also announced that she had chosen to take her husband's last name. They live in the state of Georgia. In August 2025, Brown and Bongiovi announced that they had adopted a girl. Her close friend and Stranger Things co-star Noah Schnapp is her daughter's godfather. In September 2026, People reported that Brown and Bongiovi adopted a second child, a boy.

As of August 2022, she has been an online student at Purdue University, studying health and human services.

On 3 March 2025, addressing media backlash over her appearance, Brown posted a video on her Instagram account criticising journalists, including multiple reporters from Daily Mail and former Great British Bake Off host Matt Lucas, for what she said was bullying and body shaming. Brown stated that as an adult, she should not be expected to continue looking like a child. The next day, on Instagram, Lucas posted an apology for his comments.

== Filmography ==
Key
†	Denotes films that have not yet been released

=== Film ===
Year	Title	Role	Notes	Ref.
2018	Spheres: Songs of Spacetime	Narrator	Voice role; segment: "Chorus of the Cosmos"	
2019	Godzilla: King of the Monsters	Madison Russell		
2020	Enola Holmes	Enola Holmes	Also producer	
2021	Godzilla vs. Kong	Madison Russell		
2022	Enola Holmes 2	Enola Holmes	Also producer	
2024	Damsel	Elodie Bayford	Also executive producer	
2025	The Electric State	Michelle Greene		
2026	Enola Holmes 3	Enola Holmes	Also producer	
TBA	Just Picture It †	Bea	Post-production; also producer	

=== Television ===
Year	Title	Role	Notes	Ref.
2013	Once Upon a Time in Wonderland	Young Alice	Episodes: "Down the Rabbit Hole" & "Heart of Stone"	
2014	Intruders	Madison O'Donnell	Main role; 8 episodes	
2014	NCIS	Rachel Barnes	Episode: "Parental Guidance Suggested"	
2015	Modern Family	Lizzie	Episode: "Closet? You'll Love It!"	
2015	Grey's Anatomy	Ruby	Episode: "I Feel the Earth Move"	
2016	Hell's Kitchen	Herself	Episode: "14 Chefs Compete"	
2016–2025	Stranger Things	Eleven / Jane Hopper	Main role; 40 episodes	
2020	Mariah Carey's Magical Christmas Special	Herself	Television special	

=== Music videos ===
Year	Title	Artist	Notes
2016	"Find Me"	Sigma featuring Birdy	
2017	"I Dare You"	The xx	
2018	"Girls Like You" (Original, Volume 2 and Vertical Video versions)	Maroon 5 featuring Cardi B	
2018	"In My Feelings"	Drake	
2019	"Happy Anniversary, All I Want for Christmas Is You!"	Mariah Carey	

=== Video games ===
Year	Title	Role	Notes	Refs.
2018	The Sims 4	Herself	Free downloadable character as part of an event	
2023	Fortnite Battle Royale	Eleven	Likeness; playable character	
2026	Dead by Daylight	Eleven	Likeness; playable character	

== Bibliography ==
- Brown, Millie Bobby (2023). Nineteen Steps. HarperCollins UK. ISBN 9780008530280.

== Awards and nominations ==
Major associations
Year	Association	Category	Work	Result	Refs.
2017	Primetime Emmy Awards	Outstanding Supporting Actress in a Drama Series	Stranger Things	Nominated	
2018	Primetime Emmy Awards	Outstanding Supporting Actress in a Drama Series	Stranger Things	Nominated	
2017	Screen Actors Guild Awards	Outstanding Performance by a Female Actor in a Drama Series	Stranger Things	Nominated	
2017	Screen Actors Guild Awards	Outstanding Performance by an Ensemble in a Drama Series	Stranger Things	Won	
2018	Screen Actors Guild Awards	Outstanding Performance by a Female Actor in a Drama Series	Stranger Things	Nominated	
2018	Screen Actors Guild Awards	Outstanding Performance by an Ensemble in a Drama Series	Stranger Things	Nominated	
2020	Screen Actors Guild Awards	Outstanding Performance by an Ensemble in a Drama Series	Stranger Things	Nominated	

Miscellaneous awards
Year	Association	Category	Work	Result	Refs.
2026	Joy Awards	Personality of the Year	—	Won	
2024	AACTA Awards	Audience Choice Favourite Actress	—	Nominated	
2018	Empire Awards	Best Actress in a TV Series	Stranger Things	Nominated	
2017	Fangoria Chainsaw Awards	Best TV Actress	Stranger Things	Won	
2022	Hollywood Critics Association TV Awards	Best Supporting Actress in a Streaming Series, Drama	Stranger Things	Nominated	
2017	IGN People's Choice Award	Best Dramatic TV Performance	Stranger Things	Won	
2018	Nickelodeon Kids' Choice Awards	Favorite TV Actress	Stranger Things	Won	
2019	Nickelodeon Kids' Choice Awards	Favorite TV Actress	Stranger Things	Nominated	
2020	Nickelodeon Kids' Choice Awards	Favorite Female TV Star	Stranger Things	Won	
2021	Nickelodeon Kids' Choice Awards	Favorite Female TV Star	Stranger Things	Won	
2021	Nickelodeon Kids' Choice Awards	Favorite Movie Actress	Enola Holmes	Won	
2023	Nickelodeon Kids' Choice Awards	Favorite Female TV Star (Family)	Stranger Things	Nominated	
2023	Nickelodeon Kids' Choice Awards	Favorite Movie Actress	Enola Holmes 2	Won	
2025	Nickelodeon Kids' Choice Awards	Favorite Movie Actress	The Electric State	Nominated	
2021	London Film Critics' Circle	Young British/Irish Performer of the Year	Enola Holmes	Nominated	
2017	MTV Movie & TV Awards	Best Performance in a Show	Stranger Things	Won	
2017	MTV Movie & TV Awards	Best Hero	Stranger Things	Nominated	
2018	MTV Movie & TV Awards	Best Performance in a Show	Stranger Things	Won	
2018	MTV Movie & TV Awards	Best Kiss (with Finn Wolfhard)	Stranger Things	Nominated	
2023	MTV Movie & TV Awards	Best Fight (with Jamie Campbell Bower)	Stranger Things	Nominated	
2017	NME Awards	Hero of the Year	Herself	Nominated	
2017	People's Choice Awards	Favorite Sci-Fi/Fantasy TV Actress	Stranger Things	Nominated	
2017	Saturn Awards	Best Younger Actor in a Television Series	Stranger Things	Won	
2018	Saturn Awards	Best Younger Actor in a Television Series	Stranger Things	Nominated	
2019	Saturn Awards	Best Performance by a Younger Actor	Godzilla: King of the Monsters	Nominated	
2022	Saturn Awards	Best Actress in a Streaming Series	Stranger Things	Nominated	
2021	Seattle Film Critics Society	Best Youth Performance	Enola Holmes	Nominated	
2017	Teen Choice Awards	Choice Breakout TV Star	Stranger Things	Nominated	
2018	Teen Choice Awards	Choice Sci-Fi/Fantasy TV Actress	Stranger Things	Won	
2018	Teen Choice Awards	Choice TV Ship (with Finn Wolfhard)	Stranger Things	Nominated	
2019	Teen Choice Awards	Choice Summer TV Star: Female	Stranger Things	Won	
2021	Washington D.C. Area Film Critics Association	Best Youth Performance	Enola Holmes	Nominated	
2017	Young Artist Awards	Best Performance in a Digital TV Series or Film – Young Actress	Stranger Things	Nominated	
