= Macaulay Culkin filmography =

Filmography

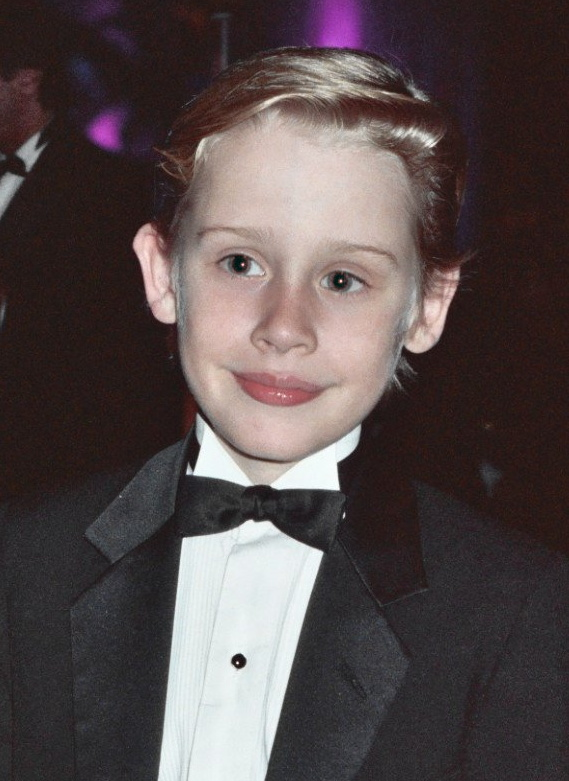
Macaulay Culkin in 1991

Macaulay Culkin is an American actor and musician. Considered one of the most successful child actors of the 1990s, Culkin rose to prominence for his role as Kevin McCallister in Home Alone for which he received a Golden Globe nomination.

== Filmography ==
=== Film ===
Year	Title	Role	Notes	Ref.
1988	Rocket Gibraltar	Cy Blue Black		
1989	Born on the Fourth of July	Kid	Scene deleted	
1989	See You in the Morning	Billy Livingstone		
1989	Uncle Buck	Miles Russell		
1990	Jacob's Ladder	Gabe Singer	Uncredited	
1990	Home Alone	Kevin McCallister		
1991	Only the Lonely	Billy Muldoon		
1991	My Girl	Thomas J. Sennett		
1992	Home Alone 2: Lost in New York	Kevin McCallister		
1993	The Good Son	Henry Evans		
1993	The Nutcracker	The Nutcracker Prince		
1994	Getting Even with Dad	Timmy Gleason		
1994	The Pagemaster	Richard Tyler		
1994	Richie Rich	Richard "Richie" Rich Jr.		
2003	Party Monster	Michael Alig		
2004	Saved!	Roland Stockard		
2007	Sex and Breakfast	James Fitz		
2011	The Wrong Ferarri	Himself		
2015	Adam Green's Aladdin	Ralph		
2019	Changeland	Ian		
2025	John Candy: I Like Me	Himself	Documentary film	
2025	Zootopia 2	Cattrick Lynxley	Voice	

=== Television ===
Year	Title	Role	Notes	Ref.
1985	The Midnight Hour	Halloween Kid (uncredited)	Television film	
1988	The Equalizer	Paul Gephardt	Episode: "Something Green"	
1991	Wish Kid	Nicholas "Nick" McClary	Voice; 13 episodes	
1991	Saturday Night Live	Himself (host)	Episode: "Macaulay Culkin /Tin Machine"	
1994	Frasier	Elliot	Voice; episode: "Seat of Power"	
2003	Will & Grace	Jason "JT" Towne	Episode: "May Divorce Be with You"	
2004	Foster Hall	Clark Hall	Pilot	
2005–2010	Robot Chicken	Luke Duke / Pikachu / Prince Adam / Dean Devlin / Bastian Bux / Kevin McCallister / Billy / Kid	Voice; 5 episodes	
2009	Kings	Andrew Cross	5 episodes	
2015–2016	The Jim Gaffigan Show	Himself	8 episodes	
2019	Dollface	Dan Hackett	Episode: "History Buff"	
2020	The Eric Andre Show	Himself	Episode: "You Got Served"	
2021	American Horror Story	Mickey	5 episodes (season 10)	
2022	The Righteous Gemstones	Harmon Freeman	2 episodes	
2022	Entergalactic	Downtown Pat	Voice; Netflix special	
2022	The Paloni Show! Halloween Special!	Schmee-mo The Dancing Disabled	Voice	
2024	The Second Best Hospital in the Galaxy	Bird Alien	Episode 1; voice	
2025	Running Point	Angry fan / Fan	2 episodes	
2025–present	Fallout	Lacerta Legate	2 episodes	

=== Commercials ===
Year	Title	Role	Notes	Ref.
2018	Google Assistant: Home Alone Again	Kevin McCallister		
2024	Uber Eats	Kevin McCallister		
2025	Home Instead: Home But Not Alone	Kevin McCallister		

== Music videos ==
Year	Title	Artist	Notes
1991	"Black or White"	Michael Jackson	
1991	"My Girl"	The Temptations	
1992	"All Alone on Christmas"	Darlene Love	
1998	"Sunday"	Sonic Youth	
2024	"Santa Baby"	Kim Kardashian	

== Theatre ==
Year	Title	Role	Venue	Notes
2000	Madame Melville	Carl	Vaudeville Theatre London	
2001	Madame Melville	Carl	Promenade Theatre, New York	
