= Wendy Greene Bricmont =

American film editor

- Education: Oberlin College
- Occupation: Film editor

Wendy Greene Bricmont is an American film editor known for her work on films such as Annie Hall, My Girl, Kindergarten Cop, The Slumber Party Massacre, and Mean Girls. She is an alumna of Oberlin College.

== Life ==
After studying English, theater and film at Oberlin College, Bricmont began her career in a New York company that specialized in editing television programs, documentaries and films. It was the television drama Bernice Bob's Her Hair where she first worked as an assistant editor under Ralph Rosenblum. Just one year later, she was editing Woody Allen's Annie Hall on an equal basis with him. Both Rosenblum and Bricmont received the BAFTA Award for Best Editing for this. Other films were to follow in which Bricmont worked as co-editor before she edited a film independently for the first time in 1983 with Love Letters, a thriller starring Jamie Lee Curtis.

She has worked with Czech director Ivan Reitman for many years since 1990. She not only edited Kindergarten Cop, Junior and One Father Too Many for him, but also Six Days, Seven Nights, Evolution and The Super Ex. She always did this alongside the multiple Oscar-nominated American editor Sheldon Kahn. Bricmont is a member of the American Cinema Editors.

== Selected filmography ==
Editor
Year	Film	Director	Notes	Other notes
1977	Annie Hall	Woody Allen		
1980	On the Nickel	Ralph Waite		
1982	The Slumber Party Massacre	Amy Holden Jones	First collaboration with Amy Holden Jones	Uncredited
1983	Love Letters	Amy Holden Jones	Second collaboration with Amy Holden Jones	
1984	Gimme an 'F'	Paul Justman		
1986	The Clan of the Cave Bear	Michael Chapman	Second collaboration with Michael Chapman	
1987	Surrender	Jerry Belson		
1988	License to Drive	Greg Beeman		
1990	Kindergarten Cop	Ivan Reitman	First collaboration with Ivan Reitman	
1991	My Girl	Howard Zieff	First collaboration with Howard Zieff	
1993	Calendar Girl	John Whitesell		
1994	My Girl 2	Howard Zieff	Second collaboration with Howard Zieff	
1994	Junior	Ivan Reitman	Second collaboration with Ivan Reitman	
1996	Race the Sun	Charles T. Kanganis		
1996	The Rich Man's Wife	Amy Holden Jones	Third collaboration with Amy Holden Jones	
1997	Fathers' Day	Ivan Reitman	Third collaboration with Ivan Reitman	
1998	Six Days, Seven Nights	Ivan Reitman	Fourth collaboration with Ivan Reitman	
1999	Light It Up	Craig Bolotin		
2001	My First Mister	Christine Lahti		
2001	Evolution	Ivan Reitman	Fifth collaboration with Ivan Reitman	
2002	The Sweetest Thing	Roger Kumble		
2004	Mean Girls	Mark Waters		
2005	Herbie: Fully Loaded	Angela Robinson		
2006	My Super Ex-Girlfriend	Ivan Reitman	Sixth collaboration with Ivan Reitman	
2007	I Think I Love My Wife	Chris Rock		
2008	Mad Money	Callie Khouri		
2010	Diary of a Wimpy Kid	Thor Freudenthal	Second collaboration with Thor Freudenthal	
2012	Fun Size	Josh Schwartz		
2012	So Undercover	Tom Vaughan		
2013	One Chance	David Frankel		
2015	The DUFF	Ari Sandel		
2016	Middle School: The Worst Years of My Life	Steve Carr		
2018	Set It Up	Claire Scanlon	First collaboration with Claire Scanlon	
2020	The High Note	Nisha Ganatra		
2022	The People We Hate at the Wedding	Claire Scanlon	Second collaboration with Claire Scanlon	
2024	Five Blind Dates	Shawn Seet		

Editorial department
Year	Film	Director	Role	Notes
1977	The Great Bank Hoax	Joseph Jacoby	Assistant editor	
1983	All the Right Moves	Michael Chapman	Associate editor	First collaboration with Michael Chapman
2009	Hotel for Dogs	Thor Freudenthal	Additional editor	First collaboration with Thor Freudenthal
2010	Barry Munday	Chris D'Arienzo	Editorial consultant	
2016	Carrie Pilby	Susan Johnson	Additional editor	

Additional crew
Year	Film	Director	Role
1977	Roseland	James Ivory	Assistant to director
1986	The Clan of the Cave Bear	Michael Chapman	Title designer: Main title

Producer
Year	Film	Director	Credit
1987	Surrender	Jerry Belson	Associate producer

Thanks
Year	Film	Director	Role
1990	Back to the Future Part III	Robert Zemeckis	Thanks

TV movies

Editor
Year	Film	Director
1986	Amazing Stories	Robert Zemeckis; Steven Spielberg; William Dear
1989	Perfect Witness	Robert Mandel

Editorial department
Year	Film	Director	Role
1976	Bernice Bobs Her Hair	Joan Micklin Silver	Assistant editor

Sound department
Year	Film	Director	Role
1976	Bernice Bobs Her Hair	Joan Micklin Silver	Sound editor

TV series

Editor
Year	Title	Notes
1986	Amazing Stories	2 episodes
