= Madison, Pennsylvania =

Borough in Pennsylvania, US

- Borough
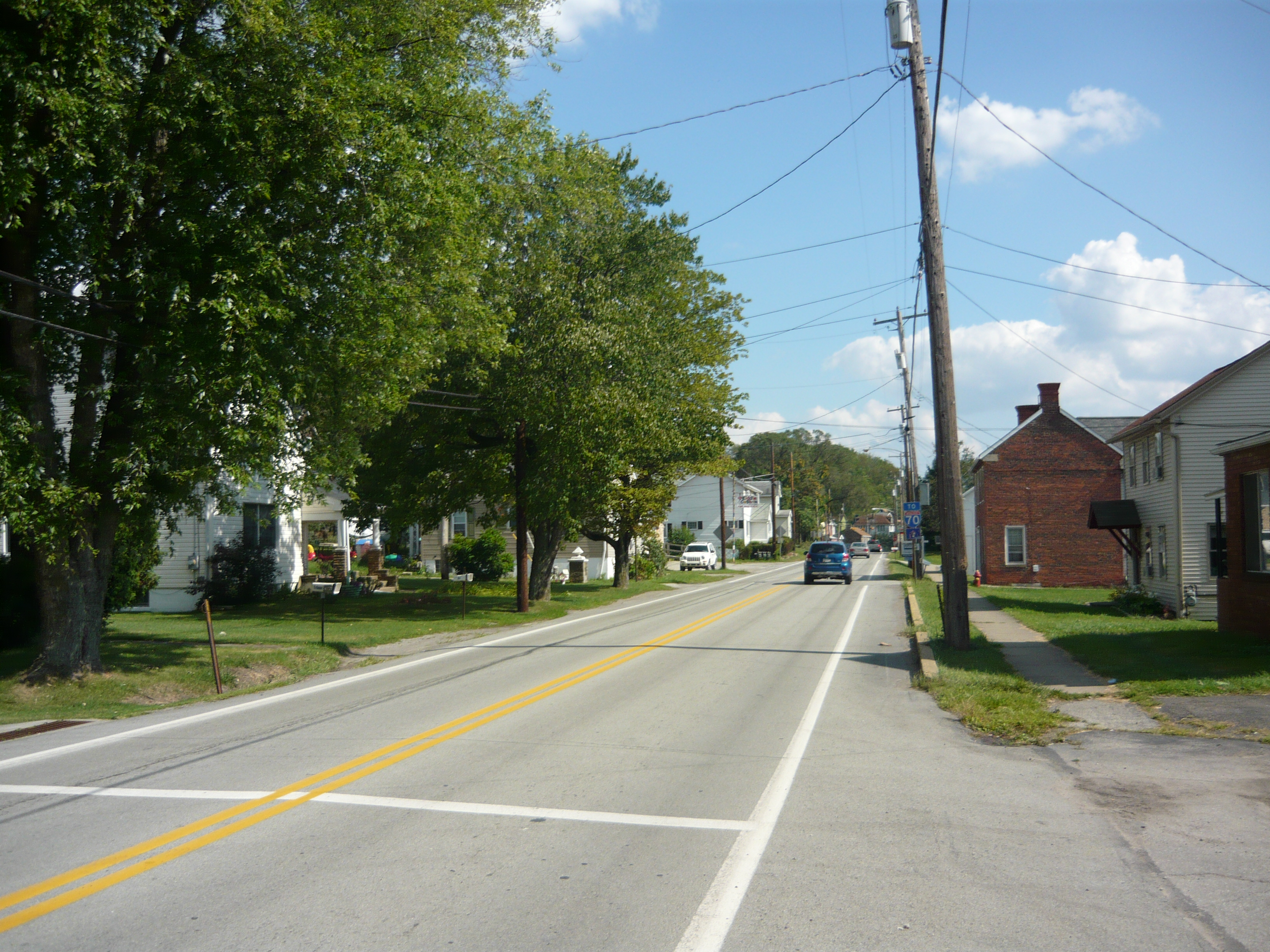
- Main Street

- Location of Madison in Westmoreland County, Pennsylvania.

- Location within Pennsylvania Location within the United States
- Coordinates: 40°14′55″N 79°40′46″W
- Country: United States
- State: Pennsylvania
- County: Westmoreland
- Incorporated: October 3, 1876

Government
  - Type: Borough Council

Area
  - Total: 0.44 sq mi (1.13 km^{2})
  - Land: 0.44 sq mi (1.13 km^{2})
  - Water: 0 sq mi (0.00 km^{2})
- Elevation: 1,178 ft (359 m)

Population (2020)
  - Total: 364
  - Density: 834.0/sq mi (322.02/km^{2})
- Time zone: UTC-5 (Eastern (EST))
  - Summer (DST): UTC-4 (EDT)
- Zip code: 15663
- FIPS code: 42-46488
- Website: https://www.madisonborough.org/

Madison is a borough in Westmoreland County, Pennsylvania, United States. As of the 2020 census, Madison had a population of 364. The borough was named for James Madison, fourth President of the United States.

== Geography ==
Madison is located at 40°14′55″N 79°40′46″W (40.248616, -79.679527).

According to the United States Census Bureau, the borough has a total area of 0.5 square miles (1.3 km^{2}), all land.

== Demographics ==
Historical population
Census	Pop.	Note	%±
1880	190		—
1890	201		5.8%
1900	464		130.8%
1910	421		−9.3%
1920	354		−15.9%
1930	365		3.1%
1940	409		12.1%
1950	386		−5.6%
1960	399		3.4%
1970	436		9.3%
1980	531		21.8%
1990	539		1.5%
2000	510		−5.4%
2010	397		−22.2%
2020	364		−8.3%

At the 2000 census there were 510 people, 219 households, and 158 families living in the borough. The population density was 962.6 inhabitants per square mile (371.7/km^{2}). There were 225 housing units at an average density of 424.7 per square mile (164.0/km^{2}). The racial makeup of the borough was 99.41% White, 0.20% Asian, and 0.39% from two or more races. Of the 219 households 22.8% had children under the age of 18 living with them, 62.6% were married couples living together, 6.4% had a female householder with no husband present, and 27.4% were non-families. 23.3% of households were one person and 12.8% were one person aged 65 or older. The average household size was 2.33 and the average family size was 2.74.

The age distribution was 17.1% under the age of 18, 8.8% from 18 to 24, 23.1% from 25 to 44, 32.4% from 45 to 64, and 18.6% 65 or older. The median age was 46 years. For every 100 females, there were 96.2 males. For every 100 females age 18 and over, there were 91.4 males.

The median household income was $41,875 and the median family income was $46,250. Males had a median income of $27,321 versus $23,958 for females. The per capita income for the borough was $20,773. About 5.0% of families and 5.9% of the population were below the poverty line, including 5.7% of those under age 18 and 8.5% of those age 65 or over.

== Education ==
The school district is Yough School District. The district's comprehensive high school is Yough Senior High School.

== In fiction ==
The 1991 film My Girl takes place in Madison in the summer of 1972. Its sequel, My Girl 2, also took place in Madison in the first part, set in the 1973–74 school year.
