= Arona, Pennsylvania =

Borough in Pennsylvania, US

- Borough
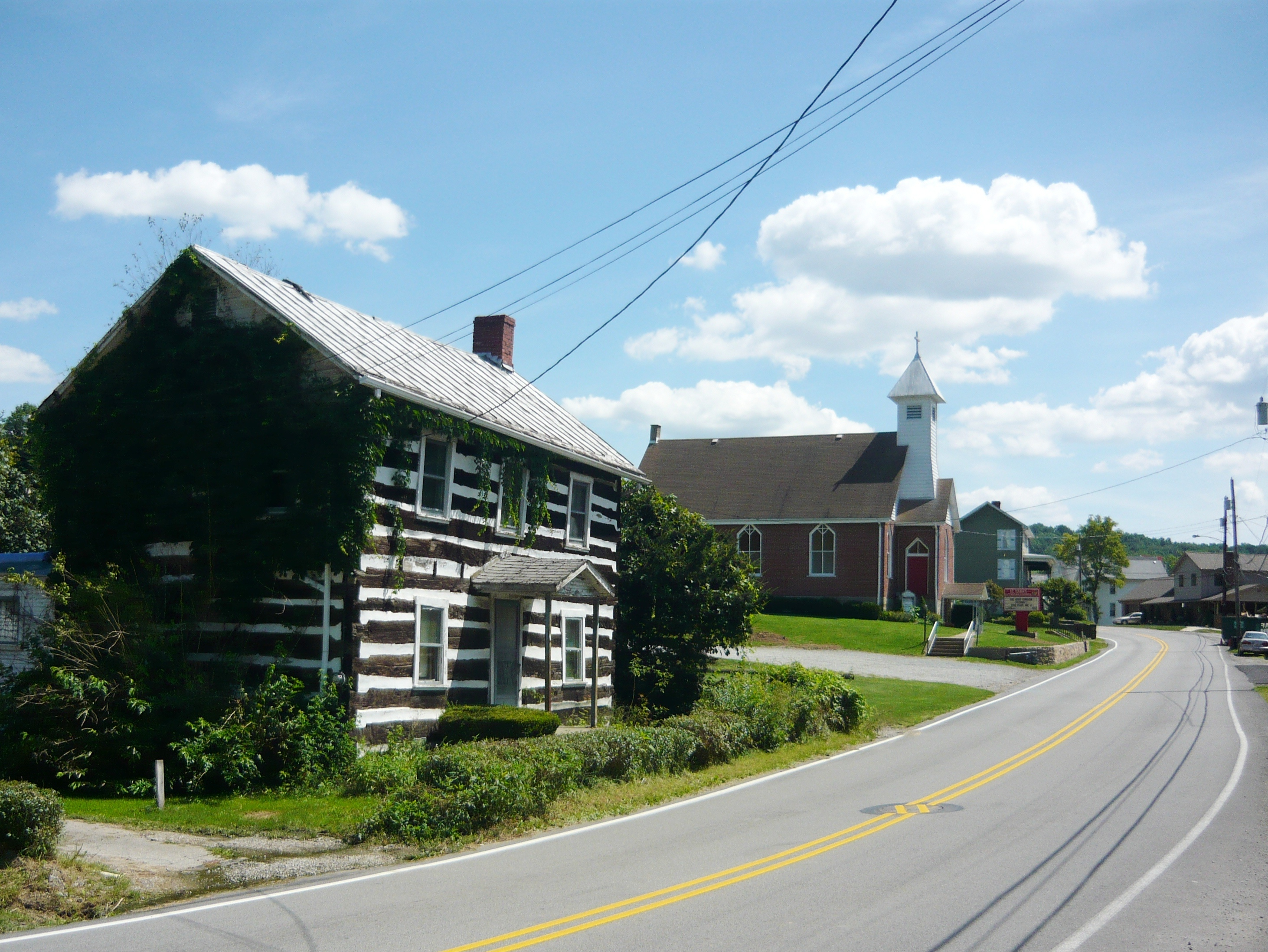
- Main Street

- Location of Arona in Westmoreland County, Pennsylvania.

- Location within Pennsylvania
- Coordinates: 40°16′11″N 79°39′38″W
- Country: United States
- State: Pennsylvania
- County: Westmoreland
- Incorporated: November 11, 1895

Government
  - Type: Borough Council

Area
  - Total: 0.53 sq mi (1.36 km^{2})
  - Land: 0.52 sq mi (1.35 km^{2})
  - Water: 0.0039 sq mi (0.01 km^{2})
- Elevation: 1,017 ft (310 m)

Population (2020)
  - Total: 255
  - Density: 488.2/sq mi (188.48/km^{2})
- Time zone: UTC-5 (Eastern (EST))
  - Summer (DST): UTC-4 (EDT)
- Zip code: 15617
- FIPS code: 42-03120
- Website: https://aronaborough.com/

Arona is a borough in Westmoreland County, Pennsylvania, United States. The population was 253 at the 2020 census.

== Geography ==
According to the United States Census Bureau, the borough has a total area of 0.5 square miles (1.3 km^{2}), all land.

== Demographics ==
Historical population
Census	Pop.	Note	%±
1900	382		—
1910	683		78.8%
1920	549		−19.6%
1930	457		−16.8%
1940	503		10.1%
1950	482		−4.2%
1960	467		−3.1%
1970	453		−3.0%
1980	446		−1.5%
1990	397		−11.0%
2000	407		2.5%
2010	370		−9.1%
2020	255		−31.1%
2021 (est.)	250	▼	−2.0%

At the 2010 census there were 370 people, 153 households, and 108 families in the borough. The population density was 664.8 inhabitants per square mile (256.7/km^{2}). There were 165 housing units at an average density of 311.3 per square mile (120.2/km^{2}). The racial makeup of the borough was 100.0% White. Of the 153 households 25.5% had children under the age of 18 living with them, 54.2% were married couples living together, 10.5% had a female householder with no husband present, and 29.4% were non-families. 24.8% of households were one person and 11.8% were one person aged 65 or older. The average household size was 2.42 and the average family size was 2.85.

The age distribution was 21.1% under the age of 18, 6.0% from 18 to 24, 26.5% from 25 to 44, 31.4% from 45 to 64, and 14.7% 65 or older. The median age was 42.4 years. For every 100 females, there were 97.9 males. For every 100 females age 18 and over, there were 100.0 males.

The median household income was $40,417 and the median family income was $61,875. Males had a median income of $38,876 versus $23,185 for females. The per capita income for the borough was $18,494. About 4.4% of families and 8.6% of the population were below the poverty line, including 7.1% of those under age 18 and 8.7% of those age 65 or over.

== Education ==
The school district is Yough School District (in an exclave). The district's comprehensive high school is Yough Senior High School.
