= Upír z Feratu =

1982 Czechoslovak horror film

- Theatrical release poster
- Czech language: Upír z Feratu
- Directed by: Juraj Herz
- Written by: Jan Fleischer; Juraj Herz
- Story by: Josef Nesvadba
- Based on: Upír po dvaceti letech by Josef Nesvadba
- Starring: Jiří Menzel; Dagmar Veškrnová; Jana Břežková; Petr Čepek; Jan Schmid; Zdenka Procházková
- Cinematography: Richard Valenta
- Edited by: Jaromír Janácek
- Music by: Petr Hapka
- Production company: Filmové Studio Barrandov
- Distributed by: Cinefear; Ostalgica
- Release dates: 1 May 1982 (Czechoslovakia); October 1982 (Chicago International Film Festival)
- Running time: 90 minutes
- Country: Czechoslovakia
- Language: Czech

Upír z Feratu, also known as Ferat Vampire, is a 1982 Czechoslovak horror film directed by Juraj Herz. The name is a pun on Upír Nosferatu, or Nosferatu the Vampire.

== Plot ==
Doctor Marek (Jiří Menzel) is shocked when his beloved nurse, Mima (Dagmar Veškrnová), signs a contract with foreign car manufacturer Ferat to work as a rally-driver. Rumors abound that the Ferat sports car runs not on petrol, but on human blood.

== Cast ==
- Jiří Menzel as Dr. Marek
- Dagmar Veškrnová as Mima
- Jana Břežková as Luisa / Klára
- Petr Čepek as Kříž
- Jan Schmid as Dr. Kaplan
- Zdenka Procházková as Madame Ferat

== Production ==
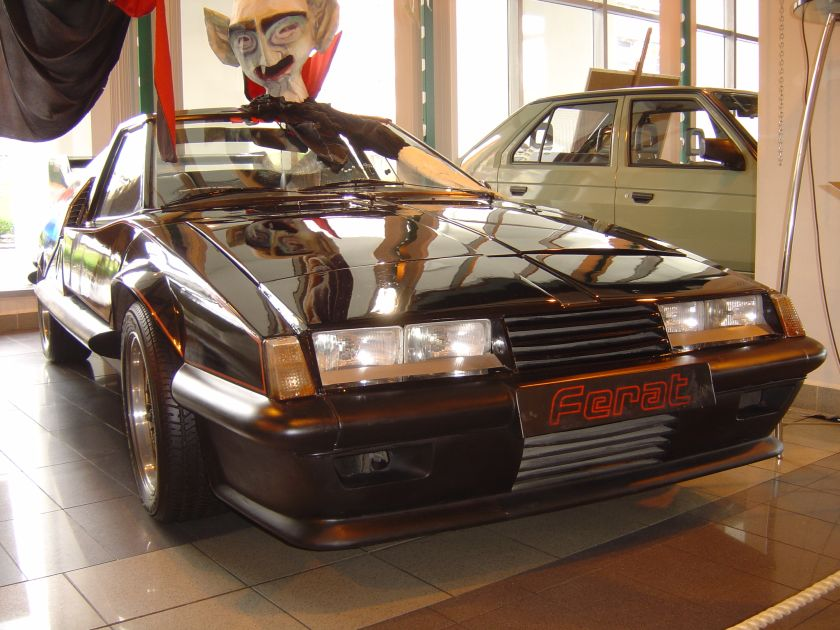
Škoda 110 Super Sport "Ferat"

The Ferat rally car used in the film was, in fact, a prototype for an unrealized sports model Škoda 110 Super Sport produced by Škoda Auto, now generally referred to as the Škoda Super Sport 'Ferat Vampir RSR' in homage to the film. A white coloured version of this prototype also appears in Tomorrow I'll Wake Up and Scald Myself with Tea.

== See also ==
- Blood Car, another film about a car that uses blood for fuel
- Road Kill, a film about a road train that uses a pulp made by grinding human bodies for fuel
- Blood Drive, a TV series centered on a road race with cars that use blood for fuel
