= Blood Car =

2007 film

- Poster
- Directed by: Alex Orr
- Written by: Hugh Braselton; Alex Orr
- Starring: Anna Chlumsky; Katie Rowlett; Mike Brune
- Production company: Fake Wood Wallpaper Films
- Distributed by: TLA Releasing
- Release date: 2007
- Running time: 76 minutes
- Country: United States
- Language: English
- Budget: $25,000
- Box office: $297

Blood Car is a 2007 black comedy film directed by Alex Orr and starring Anna Chlumsky, Katie Rowlett, and Mike Brune. It is set in a not-too-distant future where high gasoline prices lead a kindergarten teacher (Brune) to make a car that uses blood as a fuel source.

== Synopsis ==
The film begins as Archie Andrews, a kindergarten teacher and vegan, regularly buys products from Lorraine's vegetarian roadside stand. He is developing an engine powered by wheatgrass, but his experiments prove unsuccessful until he accidentally cuts his finger and blood drips into the wheatgrass. After the mixture reaches the engine, it begins to operate successfully.

Archie tests the vehicle and offers a ride to Denise, the owner of a meat stand and Lorraine's business rival. After Denise shows interest in Archie he drives her home but runs out of fuel. Seeking an alternative source of blood, Archie turns to hunting animals; however, their blood supply proves insufficient. He then targets larger prey, then violent criminals, before eventually killing people indiscriminately.

The government, having monitored Archie's progress, approaches him after the original Blood Car is destroyed. Federal agents offer him any position he desires in exchange for helping produce additional Blood Cars and agreeing to the erasure of his former identity.

When Archie questions the source of fuel for the new vehicles, the agents explain that it will be obtained from people with disabilities, criminals, and homeless people. Archie accepts the offer. The film concludes with images of his rise to the presidency intercut with scenes of government agents murdering Lorraine, Denise, Archie's kindergarten students, and other individuals connected to the development of the Blood Car.

== Cast ==
- Mike Brune as Archie Andrews
- Anna Chlumsky as Lorraine
- Katie Rowlett as Denise

== Reception ==
On Rotten Tomatoes the film has an approval rating of 63% based on reviews from 13 critics.

Variety wrote : "One-joke pic runs out of (ahem) gas in its last lap, and is too marginal for extensive travel. But it’s still frequently hilarious".

== Film festivals ==
Blood Car has been shown at various film festivals, including:

- Atlanta Film Festival, 2007
- Atlanta Film Festival, 2026
- Austin Film Festival, 2007
- Cinequest, 2007
- Seattle's True Independent Film Festival (STIFF)
- Toronto After Dark Film Festival
- Edinburgh International Film Festival

== Recognition ==
- New Visions Award Cinequest Film Festival (2007)
- Best Narrative Feature Film - Chicago Underground Film Festival Winner (2007)
- Best Feature Narrative Film - Philadelphia FirstGlance Film Festival (2007)
- Best Narrative Feature Film Award - Atlanta Underground Film Festival (2007)
- Audience Award - Faux Film Festival (2007)
- Best Feature – Backseat Film Festival (2007)

== Release ==
The film released in the United Kingdom on 23 February 2012.

== See also ==
- Upír z Feratu, another film involving a car that uses blood for fuel.
- Road Kill, film about a road train that uses a pulp made by grinding human bodies for fuel.
- Blood Drive, a TV series centered on a road race with cars that use blood for fuel.
