= Macaulay Culkin =

American actor and musician (born 1980)

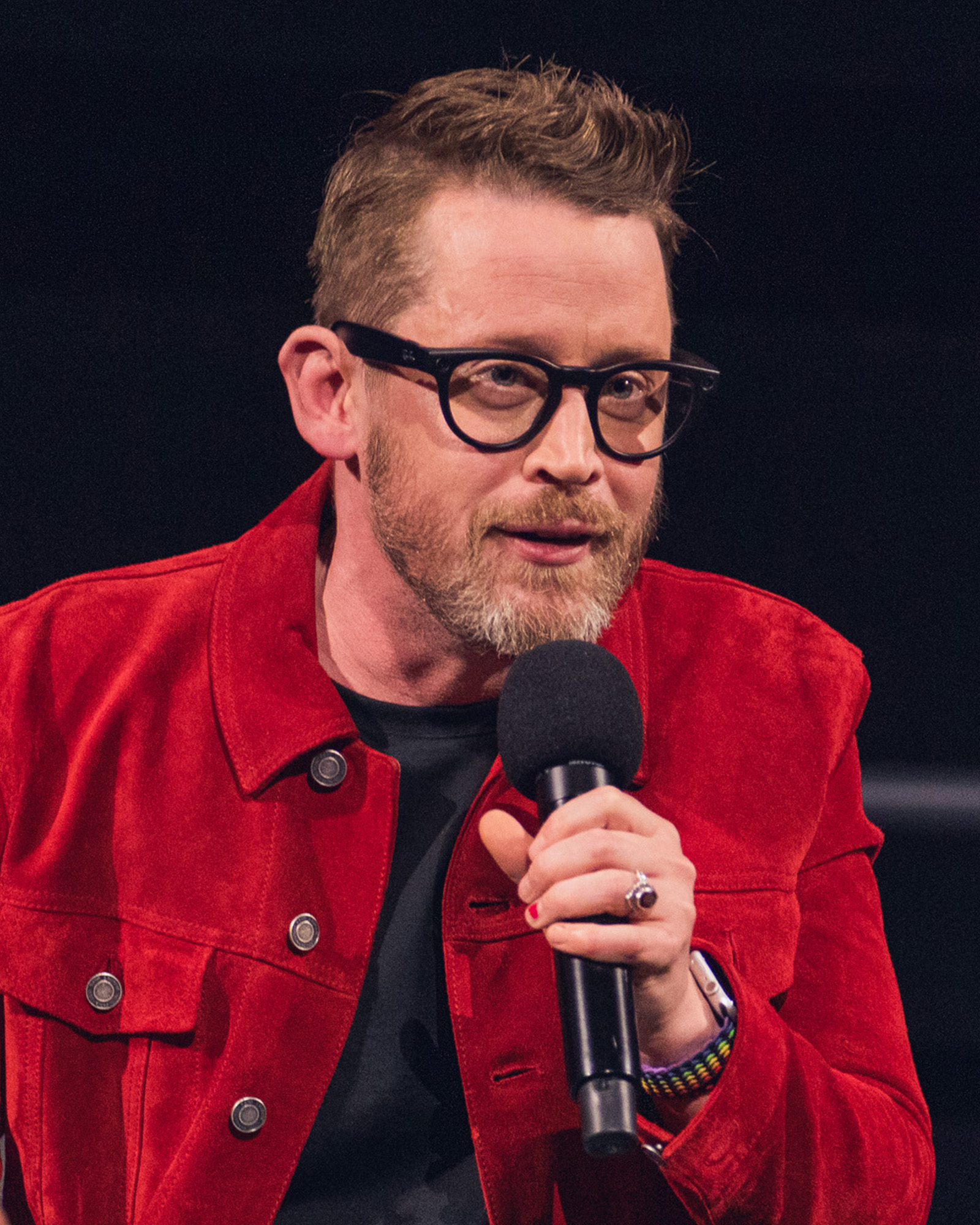
- Culkin in 2025
- Born: Macaulay Carson Culkin; August 26, 1980 (age 46); New York City, U.S.
- Other name: Macaulay Macaulay Culkin Culkin
- Occupations: Actor; musician
- Years active: 1985–present
- Works: Full list
- Spouse: Rachel Miner (m. 1998; div. 2002)
- Partner(s): Brenda Song (2017–present); Mila Kunis (2002–2010)
- Children: 2
- Father: Kit Culkin
- Relatives: Kieran Culkin (brother); Rory Culkin (brother); Bonnie Bedelia (aunt)
- Musical career
- Genres: Comedy rock; anti-folk
- Instruments: Vocals; kazoo; percussion
- Years active: 2013–present
- Formerly of: The Pizza Underground
- Website: bunnyears.com

Macaulay Macaulay Culkin Culkin (born Macaulay Carson Culkin, August 26, 1980) is an American actor and musician. Considered one of the most successful child actors of the 1990s, Culkin has received several accolades including a Golden Globe Award nomination. In 2005, he was ranked second on VH1's list of the "100 Greatest Kid-Stars". In 2023, he received a star on the Hollywood Walk of Fame.

Culkin earned recognition for playing Kevin McCallister in the Christmas comedy Home Alone (1990), and reprised the role in Home Alone 2: Lost in New York (1992). He furthered his success with the coming-of-age film My Girl (1991), the psychological thriller film The Good Son (1993), and the comedy films Getting Even with Dad and Richie Rich (both 1994). He took a hiatus starting in 1995, and returned to acting with the biographical drama film Party Monster (2003). Culkin appeared in the independent films Saved! (2004) and Sex and Breakfast (2007), and two projects by Adam Green: The Wrong Ferarri (2011) and Adam Green's Aladdin (2016). He starred in the comedy film Changeland (2019) and the tenth season of the anthology series American Horror Story (2021), followed by voice roles in Kid Cudi's television special Entergalactic (2022) and in Zootopia 2 (2025)—the second-highest-grossing animated film. Since 2025, he has had a recurring role in the television series Fallout.

Culkin wrote the autobiography Junior (2006), which describes his experiences with stardom and relationship with his father. From 2013 to 2016, he was a member of the comedy rock band the Pizza Underground, serving as the lead vocalist. In 2018, Culkin became the publisher and CEO of Bunny Ears, a satirical popular culture website and podcast.

== Early life ==
Macaulay Carson Culkin was born on August 26, 1980, in the Manhattan borough of New York City. He was named after British historian Thomas Babington Macaulay. Culkin was the third of seven children born to Christopher "Kit" Culkin, a former stage actor, and Patricia Brentrup, who was raised in North Dakota. The couple met in 1974 while Brentrup was working as a road traffic controller in Sundance, Wyoming. Culkin's six siblings include Shane (born 1976), Dakota (1979–2008), Kieran (born 1982), Quinn (born 1984), Christian (born 1987) and Rory (born 1989). He also had a paternal half-sister, Jennifer Adamson (1970–2000). His paternal aunt is actress Bonnie Bedelia. Culkin has German, Irish and Norwegian ancestry.

During Culkin's early childhood, the family lived together in a small apartment in the Yorkville neighborhood of Manhattan, and struggled financially. His mother worked as a telephone operator and his father was a sacristan at a local Catholic church. Culkin was raised Catholic and attended St. Joseph's School of Yorkville for five years before transferring to the Professional Children's School.

Despite Culkin having a good relationship with his mother, Culkin said his father was violent towards him and their family, calling him the "worst person he's ever known". He said he felt that the abuse was caused by jealousy, because "everything [Kit] tried to do in his life [Macaulay] excelled at before [he] was 10 years old". In a 2025 interview, Culkin revealed that he and his father have not made contact in over 30 years. His parents never married; they split during his teens, and his mother filed for custody. Culkin took his parents to court to remove their name from his trust fund, which was reportedly worth between $15 and 20 million, and hired an executor.

== Career ==
=== 1980s: Early work ===
Culkin began acting at age four. His early roles included a stage production of Bach Babies at the New York Philharmonic. He continued appearing in roles on stage, television and films throughout the 1980s. He made an uncredited appearance as a Halloween trick-or-treater in the television movie The Midnight Hour (1985). Culkin's first credited screen role came in February 1988, as a co-star in "Something Green," an episode of the popular action television series The Equalizer, in which he played a kidnapping victim, Paul Gephardt.

Culkin made his film debut as Cy Blue Black in the drama Rocket Gibraltar (September 1988). He played the role of Billy Livingstone in the romantic comedy film See You in the Morning (1989), starring Jeff Bridges, Alice Krige, Farrah Fawcett and Drew Barrymore. He starred as Miles Russell alongside actor John Candy in the comedy film Uncle Buck (1989).

=== 1990s: Child stardom ===
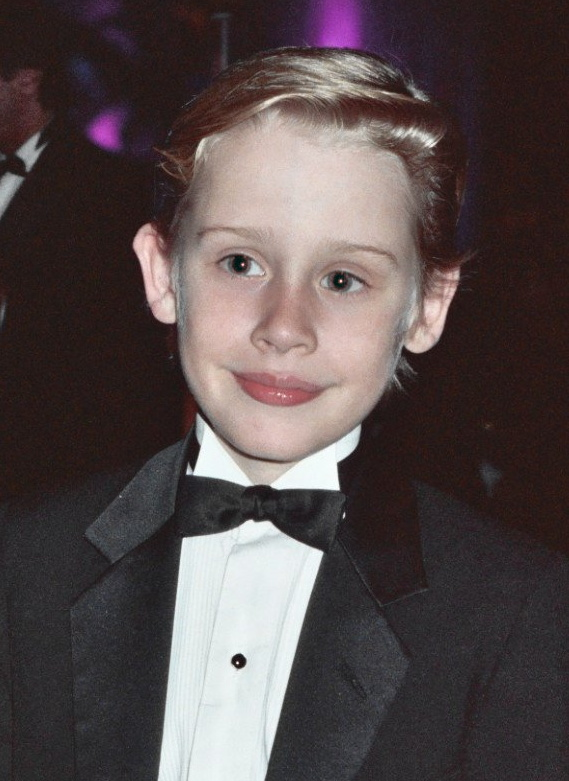
Culkin at the 1991 Emmy Awards

Culkin rose to fame with his lead role of Kevin McCallister in the blockbuster comedy film Home Alone (1990), for which he was paid $110,000 (equivalent to $271,000 in 2025). The film reunited him with Uncle Buck writer and director John Hughes and Uncle Buck co-star John Candy, who played the role of Polka band member Gus Polinski. For his performance, Culkin was nominated for a Golden Globe Award and won an American Comedy Award and a Young Artist Award. In a 2022 interview with People, co-star Joe Pesci said Culkin was "a really sweet kid and, even at his age, very professional".

In 1991, Culkin starred in an animated Saturday morning cartoon television series titled Wish Kid, hosted Saturday Night Live and starred in Michael Jackson's "Black or White" music video. He starred as Thomas J. Sennett in the film My Girl (1991), for which he was nominated for Best On-Screen Duo and won Best Kiss at the MTV Movie Awards, with Anna Chlumsky.

Culkin was paid $4,500,000 (equivalent to $10,300,000 in 2025) for Home Alone 2: Lost in New York (1992). He played the role of Henry in the drama thriller film The Good Son (1993), which only did reasonably well, although he was nominated for an MTV Movie Award in the category for Best Villain for his performance. He was also a student at the School of American Ballet and appeared in a filmed version of The Nutcracker as the title role in 1993, which was staged by Peter Martins from the 1954 George Balanchine New York City Ballet version of the work. In 1994, Culkin appeared in three films: Getting Even with Dad (1994), The Pagemaster (1994) and Richie Rich (1994).

Culkin established himself as one of the most successful child actors of the 1990s. He grew tired of acting and retired after Richie Rich. Wanting a "normal life", he went to a private high school in Manhattan. In 1998, he appeared in the music video for the song "Sunday" by the rock band Sonic Youth.

=== 2000s: Career return and independent films ===
In 2000, Culkin returned to acting with a role in the play Madame Melville, which was staged in London's West End. He reprised the role off Broadway in 2001. In early 2003, he made a guest appearance on the NBC sitcom Will & Grace. His role as Karen Walker's deceptively immature divorce lawyer won him favorable reviews. Culkin headed back into motion pictures in 2003 with Party Monster, in which he played a role very different from those he was known for, that of party promoter Michael Alig, a drug user and murderer. He quickly followed that with a supporting part in Saved!, as a cynical wheelchair-using, non-Christian student in a conservative Christian high school. Though Saved! only had modest success at the box office, Culkin received positive reviews for his role in the film and its implications for a career as an adult actor. Culkin began doing voice-over work, with appearances in Seth Green's Robot Chicken. In 2005, he was ranked second on VH1's list of the "100 Greatest Kid-Stars" behind Gary Coleman.

In 2006, he published an experimental, semi-autobiographical novel titled Junior, which talked about his stardom and his shaky relationship with his father. He starred in Sex and Breakfast, a dark comedy written and directed by Miles Brandman. Alexis Dzien, Kuno Becker and Eliza Dushku also star in this story of a couple whose therapist recommends they engage in group sex. Shooting for the film, Culkin's first since Saved!, took place in September 2006. The film opened in Los Angeles on November 30, 2007, and was released on DVD on January 22, 2008, by First Look Pictures. Culkin's next project was a role in the thirteen-episode NBC television series Kings as Andrew Cross.

In 2009, Culkin appeared in a UK-based commercial for Aviva Insurance (formerly Norwich Union) to help promote the company's rebranding. Culkin stared into the camera stating, "Remember me." On August 17, 2009, Culkin made a brief cameo appearance on WWE Raw at the Scottrade Center in St. Louis, following a "falls count anywhere" match between Hornswoggle and Chavo Guerrero Jr., in which Guerrero was defeated by the classic Home Alone gag of rigging a swinging paint can to hit him upon opening a door. Culkin appeared in the doorway and said, "That's not funny."

=== 2010s: The Pizza Underground and guest appearances ===
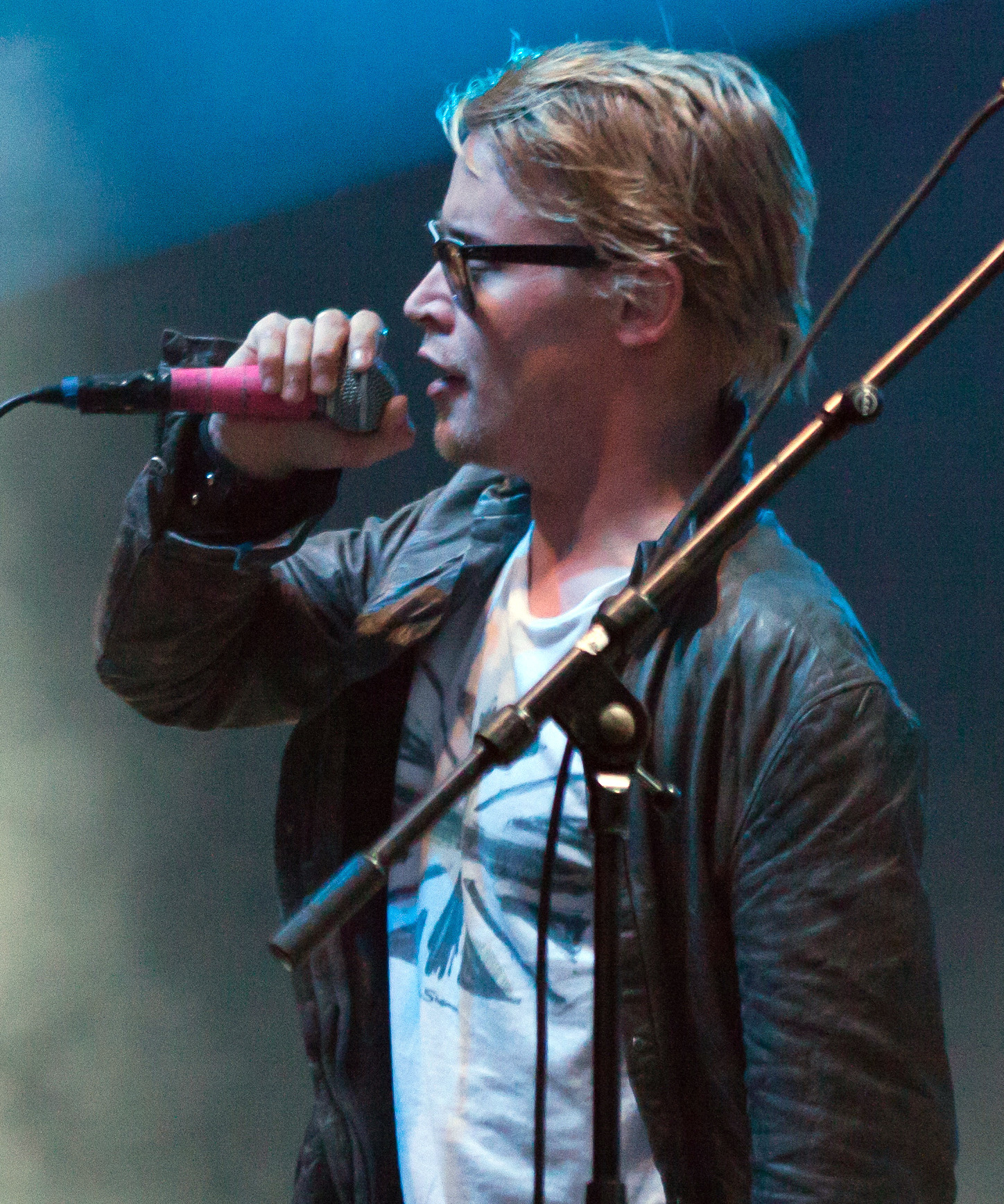
Macaulay Culkin at Berlin Festival in 2010

In February 2010, Culkin appeared in an episode of Poppy de Villeneuve's online series for The New York Times, The Park. On March 7 of the same year, he appeared alongside actors Matthew Broderick, Molly Ringwald, Judd Nelson, Ally Sheedy, Anthony Michael Hall and Jon Cryer in a tribute to the late John Hughes at the Oscars. In April 2011, Culkin was featured in musician Adam Green's experimental film The Wrong Ferarri, which was entirely shot on an iPhone. In the same month, he also appeared in the music video for "Stamp Your Name on It" performed by Green's former bandmate Jack Dishel/Only Son. In September 2012, he appeared in a video on YouTube explaining how he turned his apartment in New York into a painting workshop.

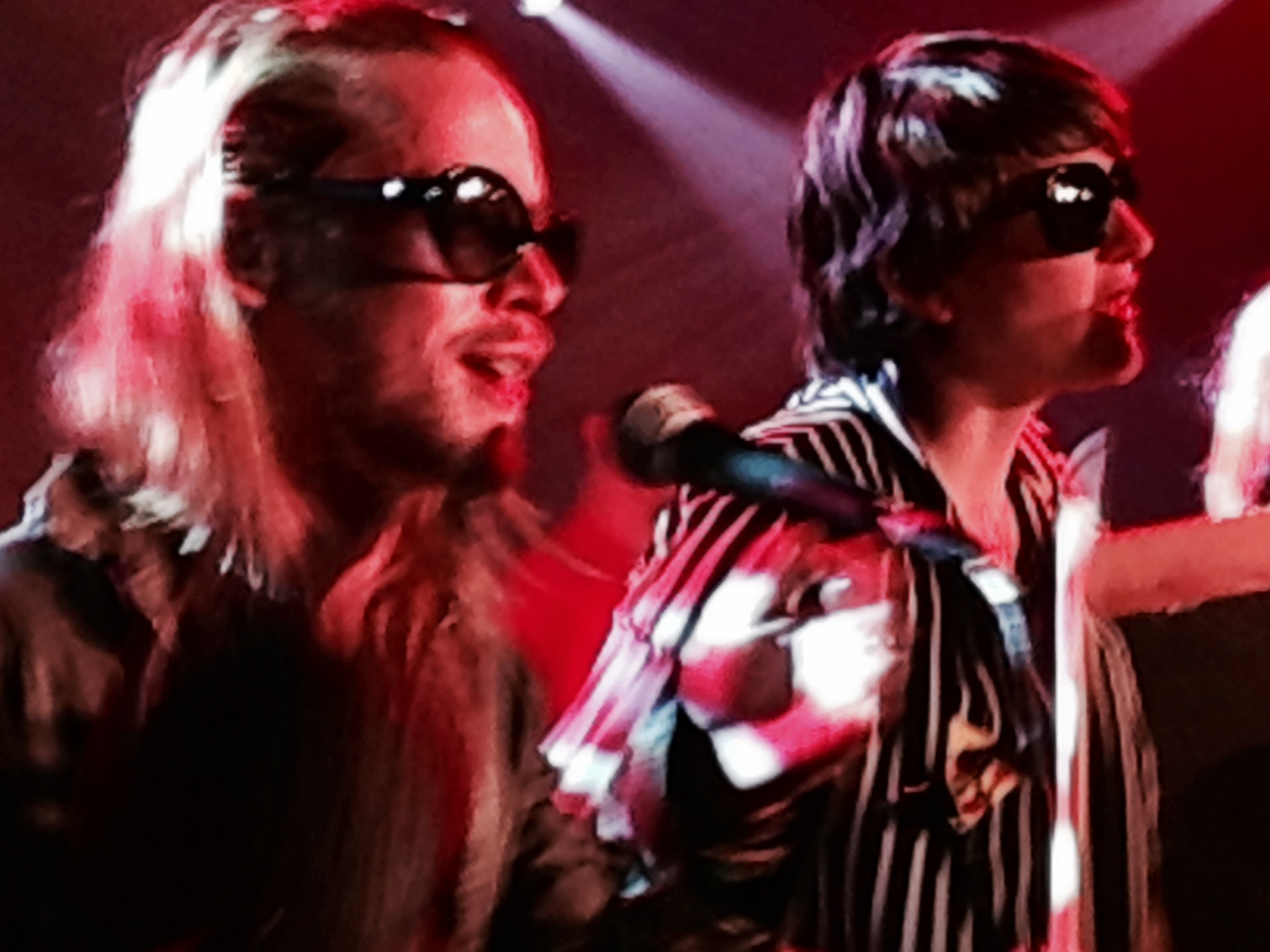
Culkin with the Pizza Underground in Chicago, 2014

In December 2013, a viral video of Culkin eating a cheese pizza was uploaded to YouTube. This was a parody of Andy Warhol consuming a Burger King Whopper in Jørgen Leth's documentary 66 Scenes from America. Culkin was promoting the debut of his New York–based, pizza-themed comedy rock band the Pizza Underground. Their tour began in Brooklyn on January 24, 2014. In late May 2014, Culkin stormed off stage at Rock City during his kazoo solo after fans began booing and throwing pints of beer at the band. They subsequently cancelled the remaining UK shows, though they claimed the cancellation had nothing to do with the Rock City performance. On July 10, 2016, Culkin announced that the Pizza Underground was splitting up and their next album would be the last.

In July 2016, Culkin appeared in a television advertisement for Compare the Market. In January 2018, Culkin launched a comedy website and podcast called Bunny Ears that parodied other celebrity-owned websites such as Gwyneth Paltrow's Goop. Since 2018, Culkin has been a frequent guest of Red Letter Media, appearing in multiple episodes of their Best of the Worst, re:View and Half in the Bag webseries, as well as Angry Video Game Nerd, where he appears as a parody of himself. In an advertisement for Google Assistant published on December 19, 2018, Culkin reprised his Home Alone role as Kevin McCallister after 28 years. It recreated scenes from the movie where McCallister shaved his face, jumped on the bed, and decorated the Christmas tree, all while asking Google Assistant to set reminders for him. In 2019, he had a role in Seth Green's movie Changeland with his future partner, Brenda Song, which was released on June 7, 2019.

=== 2020s: Career resurgence ===
In 2021, Culkin was part of the starring cast of the series' tenth season, American Horror Story: Double Feature. His role in the season was critically praised. In 2022, he played a minor role in two episodes of The Righteous Gemstones, and had a supporting role in Kid Cudi's animated film Entergalactic.

On December 1, 2023, Culkin received a star on the Hollywood Walk of Fame. In attendance at the ceremony were his Home Alone co-star Catherine O'Hara and Party Monster co-star Natasha Lyonne, who gave speeches in Culkin's honor. In 2025, he played Cattrick Lynxley in Zootopia 2, and joined the cast in the second season of Fallout.

In a December 2025 episode of the SmartLess podcast, Culkin said that he considers every gig his last, and that he "un-retires" and retires again if he finds projects that are interesting to him.

== Personal life ==
Culkin tends to refrain from disclosing aspects of his personal life; however, he has discussed his life as a child actor, the conflict in his family life, including his estrangement from his father, and how he retired from acting at age 14. He resides in the Toluca Lake neighborhood of Los Angeles, in a house he bought in June 2025.

On September 17, 2004, Culkin was arrested in Oklahoma City for the possession of 17.3 grams (0.61 oz) of marijuana and two controlled substances, 16.5 milligrams (0.25 grains) of alprazolam and 32 milligrams (0.5 grains) of clonazepam, for which he was briefly jailed and then released on $4,000 bail. After being arraigned in court for misdemeanor drug offenses, he pleaded not guilty at the trial (October 15, 2004, to June 9, 2005), but later reversed the plea to guilty. He received three one-year suspended prison sentences and was ordered to pay $540 in fees.

In December 2018, Culkin announced that he would legally change his name to "Macaulay Macaulay Culkin Culkin" after holding a vote through his website to choose a new middle name, with "Macaulay Culkin" winning the vote over four other candidates. He announced in April 2019 that the legal name change process had been completed.

In August 2020, on his 40th birthday, Culkin tweeted, "Hey guys, wanna feel old? I'm 40. You're welcome." The tweet became one of the most-liked tweets of all time, peaking at number 9.

=== Relationships ===
Culkin married actress Rachel Miner in 1998 when they were both 17, but they separated in 2000 and divorced in 2002.

Culkin dated actress Mila Kunis from 2002 to 2010.

In 2017, Culkin started dating Changeland co-star Brenda Song, having met while working together on that film. Their first child, a son, was born in 2021. Shortly after their son's birth, comments Culkin made on a 2018 episode of The Joe Rogan Experience about his relationship with Song (a Hmong–Thai American) resurfaced, which were criticized for stereotyping Asians. In the interview, Culkin joked about the shape of Song's eyes, their interracial relationship, and the appearance of their potential future children. He argued that he was entitled to make Asian jokes because of his relationship with Song, and because of his future fatherhood to multiracial children, stating that he would "understand the struggle". Culkin and Song's second son was born in 2022.

=== Friendships ===
Around the time of the first Home Alone movie, Culkin became friends with the pop singer Michael Jackson and appeared in Jackson's 1991 "Black or White" music video. In 2005, at Jackson's trial for sexual child abuse, Culkin testified that he had slept in bed with Jackson but that he was never molested. Culkin dismissed the allegations against Jackson as "absolutely ridiculous". Culkin attended Jackson's burial on September 3, 2009. Culkin is also the godfather of Jackson's children Paris Jackson, Michael Joseph "Prince" Jackson Jr. and Prince Michael "Bigi" Jackson. Culkin has consistently defended Jackson against allegations of child molestation, and said in a 2020 interview with Esquire: "I never saw anything; he never did anything."

Culkin is close with fellow actor Seth Green, with whom he co-starred in the film Party Monster, as well as in Green's 2019 directorial debut, Changeland, and on episodes of Green's adult animated sitcom Robot Chicken.

== Awards and nominations ==
Awards and nominations received by Macaulay Culkin
Award	Year (Note: Indicates the year of ceremony. Each year is linked to the article about the awards held that year, wherever possible.)	Category	Nominated work	Result	Ref.
American Comedy Awards	1991	Funniest Actor in a Motion Picture	Home Alone	Won	
Chicago Film Critics Association Awards	1991	Most Promising Actor	Home Alone	Won	
Golden Globe Awards	1991	Best Actor in a Motion Picture – Musical or Comedy	Home Alone	Nominated	
Youth in Film Award	1991	Best Leading Young Actor in a Feature Film	Home Alone	Won	
MTV Movie & TV Awards	1992	Best Kiss (shared with Anna Chlumsky)	My Girl	Won	
MTV Movie & TV Awards	1992	Best On-Screen Duo (shared with Anna Chlumsky)	My Girl	Nominated	
MTV Movie & TV Awards	1995	Best Villain	The Good Son	Nominated	
Stinkers Bad Movie Awards	1995	Worst Actor	Getting Even with Dad, The Pagemaster and Richie Rich	Nominated	
Golden Raspberry Awards (Razzies)	1995	Worst Actor	Getting Even with Dad, The Pagemaster and Richie Rich	Nominated	
Stinkers Bad Movie Awards	2003	Worst Actor	Party Monster	Nominated	

== Bibliography ==
- Holmstrom, John. The Moving Picture Boy: An International Encyclopaedia from 1895 to 1995, Norwich, Michael Russell, 1996, p. 398.
