= Junior (novel) =

Book by Macaulay Culkin

- First edition cover
- Author: Macaulay Culkin
- Language: English
- Genre: Autobiographical novel
- Publisher: Miramax
- Publication date: March 15, 2006
- Publication place: United States
- Media type: Print (Hardcover)
- Pages: 224 pp
- ISBN: 1-4013-5234-0
- OCLC: 64405578
- Dewey Decimal: 813/.6 22
- LC Class: PS3603.U57 J86 2005

Junior is an autobiographical novel, written by actor Macaulay Culkin, that was published in 2006. It is a collection of vignettes, thoughts, and cartoons about a child star who quit show business while he was still popular. One review stated the book is "a couple hundred pages of semi-coherent diary entries coupled with a handful of scrawled drawings."
