= Yough School District =

School district in Pennsylvania

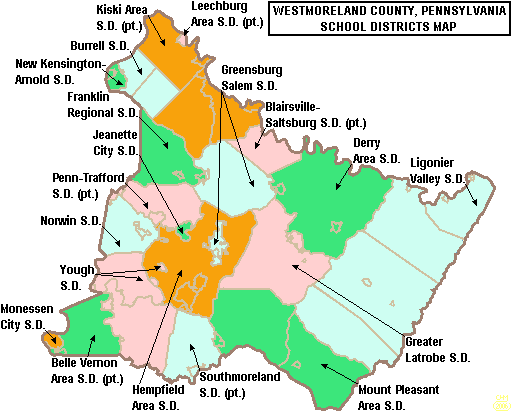

Address
- 915 Lowber Road Herminie, Pennsylvania, 15637; United States

District information
- Type: Public

Students and staff
- District mascot: Cougars
- Colors: Green, Orange

Other information
- Website: www.youghsd.net

Yough School District is a midsized, rural public school district in southwestern Pennsylvania in Westmoreland County. It serves West Newton, Herminie, Smithton, Sutersville, Madison, and Arona boroughs, the communities of Gratztown, Turkeytown, Fitzhenry, Reduction, Scott Haven and Lowber, as well as Sewickley and South Huntingdon Townships. Yough School District encompasses approximately 77 square miles (200 km^{2}). Its school colors are green and orange. According to 2000 federal census data it serves a resident population of 17,485. In 2009, the district residents' per capita income was $16,708, while the median family income was $39,772. The district was named after the Youghiogheny River.

== Schools ==
- Yough Senior High School (Grades 9–12)
- Yough Intermediate / Middle School (Grades 5–8)
- HW Good Elementary (K–4)
- Mendon Elementary (K–4)*West Newton Elementary (K–4)
