= My Girl 2 =

1994 film by Howard Zieff

- Theatrical release poster
- Directed by: Howard Zieff
- Written by: Janet Kovalcik
- Based on: Characters by Laurice Elehwany
- Produced by: Brian Grazer; Joseph M. Caracciolo; David T. Friendly
- Starring: Dan Aykroyd; Jamie Lee Curtis; Anna Chlumsky; Austin O'Brien
- Cinematography: Paul Elliott
- Edited by: Wendy Greene Bricmont
- Music by: Cliff Eidelman
- Production company: Imagine Entertainment
- Distributed by: Columbia Pictures
- Release date: February 11, 1994
- Running time: 99 minutes
- Country: United States
- Language: English
- Box office: $28 million

My Girl 2 is a 1994 American comedy-drama film. A sequel to the 1991 film My Girl, it was directed by Howard Zieff from a screenplay written by Janet Kovalcik, and starring Dan Aykroyd, Jamie Lee Curtis, Anna Chlumsky, and Austin O'Brien.

The film follows Vada Sultenfuss, who travels from her home in suburban Pennsylvania to Los Angeles to find more information about her deceased mother.

The film was released by Columbia Pictures on February 11, 1994 and grossed $28 million worldwide.

A book based on the script was written by Patricia Hermes in 1994.

== Plot ==
Vada Sultenfuss has matured from the 11-year-old hypochondriac in 1972 to a more serious teenager in early 1974. (Note: As depicted in My Girl (1991).) Her father Harry and his new wife Shelly DeVoto, whom he previously dated, are expecting a baby, and they all still live in the Sultenfuss funeral parlor in Madison, Pennsylvania. To accommodate the new baby, Vada moves into her late Gramoo's old bedroom.

Vada struggles with these adjustments, along with figuring boys out. A male schoolmate named Kevin Phillips seemingly likes her friend Judy, but Vada wonders if he likes her reciprocally. Both her father and Shelly unsuccessfully try to give her some advice regarding adolescent males.

For a school assignment to write an essay on someone she admires but has never met, Vada chooses to profile her deceased biological mother, Margaret Ann Muldovan (Maggie). However, she has scant sources to go on, all confined to a small box. Among its contents are programs of plays her mother acted in, a passport, and a mystery paper bag with a date scribbled on it.

Vada expresses her desire to travel someday, so Shelly concocts a plan for her to go to Los Angeles during her spring break. There she can stay with her uncle Phil and do research on her mother, who grew up there. Initially resistant, believing she is too young to be traveling by herself and fearing what might happen to her, Harry lets Vada take the five-day trip.

Upon arrival, Vada encounters an adolescent boy named Nick who picks her up on Phil's behalf; he is the son of Phil's girlfriend Rose Zsigmond, who operates a car repair shop where Phil is now a mechanic. Vada notices that her uncle has trouble with commitment, while he and Rose live together. Although initially annoyed about sacrificing his own spring break, Nick assists her with the difficult task of obtaining more information about her mother by taking her around the city.

Initially planning to visit her mother's high school, Vada discovers that it was destroyed in a fire. Nevertheless, she and Nick eventually track down a yearbook and meet several people who knew Maggie in high school, including police officer Daryl Tanaka, photographer Stanley Rosenfeld, and film director Peter Webb. Vada also meets her favorite poet, Alfred Beidermeyer, who also lives in Los Angeles, but is dismayed when he advises her not to become a writer. Later on, Nick and Vada sneak out to visit some Hollywood attractions, during which time she also gets her ears pierced, despite Nick's opposition.

Shockingly, Vada also learns that her mother was once suspended from school for smoking and was previously briefly married to a man named Jeffrey Pommeroy. Emotionally crushed, she suspects that he may actually be her biological father instead. Realizing he could unlock her mother's past, she successfully implores Officer Tanaka to locate him.

When Vada arrives at Jeffrey's residence, he instantly remembers Maggie. He provides Vada with valuable information for her essay, explaining the date written on the paper bag and showing her a home movie featuring Maggie singing the Charlie Chaplin composition "Smile", which greatly touches her. Jeffrey also assuringly explains that he is not her father, explaining they divorced before Vada was born because Maggie wanted stability and a family, which her father Harry was able to provide.

Meanwhile, Phil tries to prove his love to Rose after cardiologist Sam Helburn, a frequent patron of the repair shop who owns a fancy car, repeatedly stops by and continuously attempts to romance her. When Phil finally gets the courage to show how much she means to him, he proposes, which she accepts happily.

After Vada and Nick part ways at the airport, on the return flight to Pennsylvania, she finds he has gifted her a pair of earrings in her backpack as a memento. Upon arriving home, she is informed that Shelly has recently delivered the baby and meets her newborn half-brother at the hospital. To calm his crying, Vada cradles him in her arms and sings "Smile". She ultimately receives an A+ on her essay, vowing to share her findings with him when he is older.

== Cast ==
- Dan Aykroyd as Harry Sultenfuss, Vada's father and director at Sultenfuss funeral parlor.
- Jamie Lee Curtis as Shelly Sultenfuss, Vada's stepmother and Harry's new wife. Shelly Sultenfuss worked as the make-up artist at Sultenfuss funeral parlor before they were married.
- Anna Chlumsky as Vada Sultenfuss, the main character, now thirteen years old.
- Austin O'Brien as Nick Zsigmond, the son of Rose Zsigmond and Vada's love interest during her stay in Los Angeles.
- Richard Masur as Phil Sultenfuss, Harry's brother who has moved to Los Angeles since My Girl and works as an auto mechanic.
- Christine Ebersole as Rose Zsigmond, Phil's girlfriend who runs the auto shop he works at.
- John David Souther as Jeffrey Pommeroy, the first husband of Vada's mother, Maggie Muldovan, a brief marriage.
- Angeline Ball as Maggie Muldovan, Vada's mother (as seen in home movies Vada views when she visits Jeffrey).
- Aubrey Morris as Alfred Beidermeyer, a poet and university professor who had Maggie as a student and whose work Vada admires.
- Gerrit Graham as Dr. Sam Helburn, a cardiologist who frequently visits the auto shop, and captures Rose's attention.
- Anthony R. Jones as Arthur, Harry's assistant at the funeral parlor.
- Roland Thomson as Kevin Phillips, Vada's classmate.
- Ben Stein as Stanley Rosenfeld, a photographer who knew Maggie in high school.
- Keone Young as Daryl Tanaka, a police officer who knew Maggie in high school.
- Richard Beymer as Peter Webb, a film director who knew Maggie.
- Jodie Markell as Hillary Mitchell, a psychic who knew Maggie and also Jeffrey Pommeroy.

== Production ==
In January 1993, it was reported that Imagine Entertainment was developing a sequel to My Girl for Columbia Pictures with Anna Chlumsky, Dan Aykroyd, and Jamie Lee Curtis set to reprise their roles and Howard Zieff to return as director. Carrie Fisher was hired to perform a rewrite of Janet Kovalcik's script.

== Release ==
The film debuted at number 4 at the U.S. box office, earning approximately $5 million during its opening weekend. It went on to gross $17,359,799 domestically and $11 million internationally for a worldwide gross of $28 million.

=== Critical response ===
My Girl 2 holds a 27% rating on Rotten Tomatoes based on fifteen reviews.

Peter Rainer of the Los Angeles Times was critical of the film, writing that its "dubious scenario is made even more so by the treacly approach of director Howard Zieff and screenwriter Janet Kovalcik. Everything in this film is sugared with sermons about the importance of Being Yourself. Vada doesn't experience any twinges of rage at the loss of her mother or any misgivings about her quest. She's preternaturally mature."

Stephen Holden of The New York Times, however, commended it as "appealingly sentimental," adding: "Where the first movie forced Vada to face some jarring realities (a best friend's death, a grandmother's senility) and was heavily salted with mortuary humor, the atmosphere of the sequel is softer and more golden. Among other things, the film is a nostalgic valentine to Los Angeles in palmier days when the city still wore the mystique of a laid-back, post-hippie lotus land."

Roger Ebert awarded the film two out of four stars, noting that it "seems inspired mostly by the opportunity to recycle the title of a successful film. Scrutinizing the popularity of the first film, perhaps the producers thought it depended on gentle sentimentality, in which a likable young girl deals with the loss of loved ones. As an idea for a series, this is fairly dangerous... I think it's time to give Vada a break, before she becomes a necrophile, and starts spending all of her time upstairs like Emily Dickinson, writing bleak little poems." Joe Leydon of Variety deemed the film a "pleasant, painless and, as sequels go, genuinely ambitious," but conceded that it "may not be enough... to broaden its appeal beyond its obvious target audience of preteen and young adolescent girls (and, of course, tag-along parents and boyfriends)."

=== Home media ===
Columbia-TriStar Home Entertainment released the film on VHS on June 11, 1996. It was released for the first time on DVD in the United States on December 3, 2002.

== Awards ==
For her performance, Chlumsky won a Young Artist Award for "Best Performance by a Young Actress Starring in a Motion Picture"; Thomson and O'Brien were also nominated for Young Artist Awards for their roles.

== Cancelled sequel ==
For several years Still My Girl (aka My Girl 3) was proposed as the third motion picture in the My Girl movie franchise and it was in development at Columbia Pictures. In his 2003 United Kingdom talk show interview with host Michael Parkinson, Dan Aykroyd stated that Columbia had an interest in "getting this off the ground" and strong interest in Anna Chlumsky returning to her role as Vada. In 2009, both Chlumsky and Aykroyd were still attached to the project but as the time passed it was becoming less and less likely that it would ever go into production. In April 2012, Chlumsky "put to rest" any rumors that such a film was in development.
