= Škoda 110 Super Sport =

1971 prototype sports car

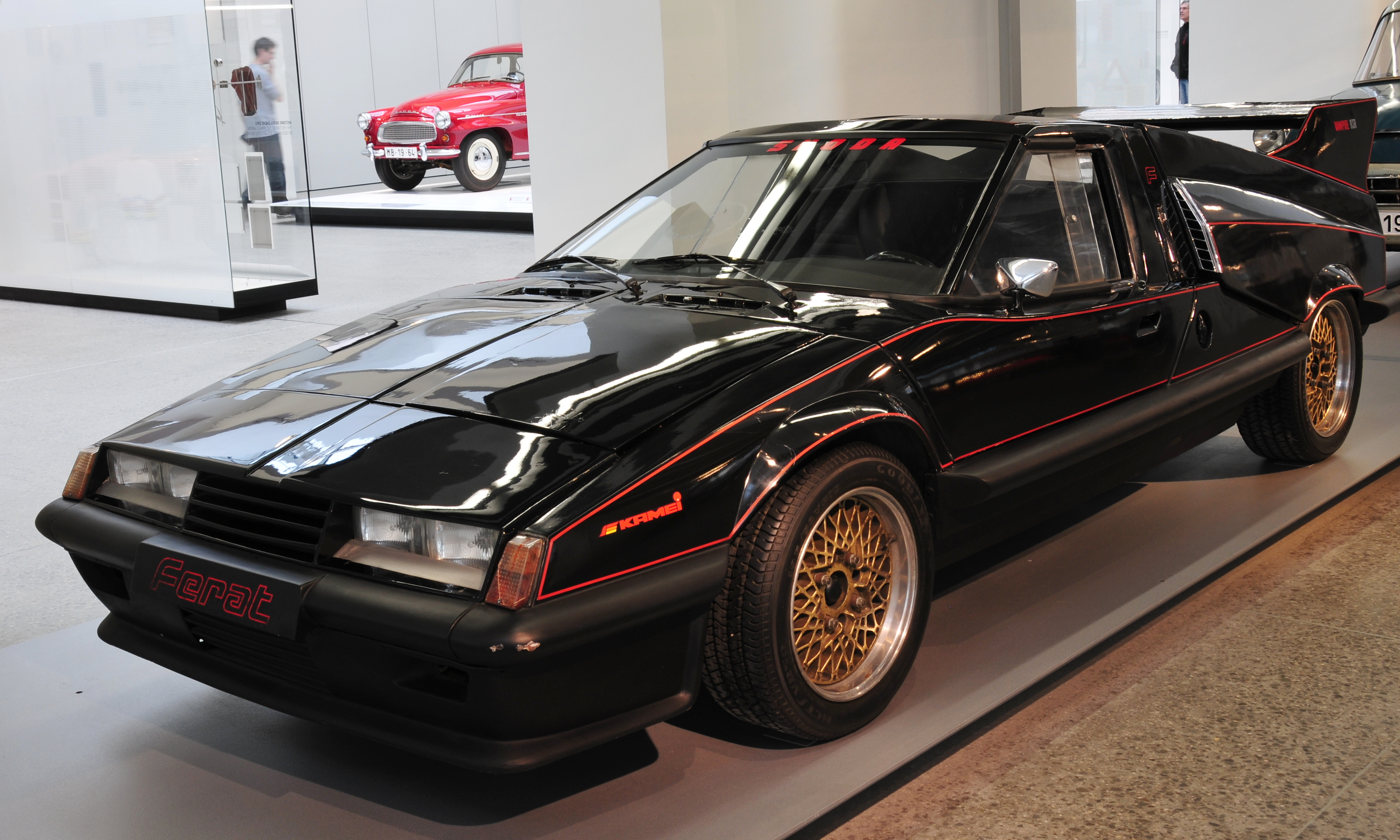
Škoda Super Sport in the Škoda museum

The Škoda 110 Super Sport (type 724) was a prototype sports car with rear engine and rear wheel drive, development took place in 1969-1971 and a prototype was produced in 1971.

The car had an aerodynamic body made of fiberglass, there were six flip-up headlights in front, and behind it there was space for luggage and a spare wheel. The doors flipped up along with the windshield and roof. In the rear part of the car there was an engine - an in-line four-cylinder from the Škoda 110 L Rallye. For testing purposes, a more powerful 1147 cm³ engine was temporarily installed in the car. There were 16 round lights on the rear end, 6 in the upper row at the edge of three and 10 in the lower row across the entire width of the car.

A single specimen was produced in Kvasiny, which was white in color. It was introduced in 1972 at the Brussels Motor Show. Despite the public interest, it did not make it into serial production. In Czechoslovakia, the car was criticized for too angular shapes, but in the West, in Road and Track magazine, the Škoda 110 Supersport was rated better than the Aston Martin prototype.

== "Ferat" ==
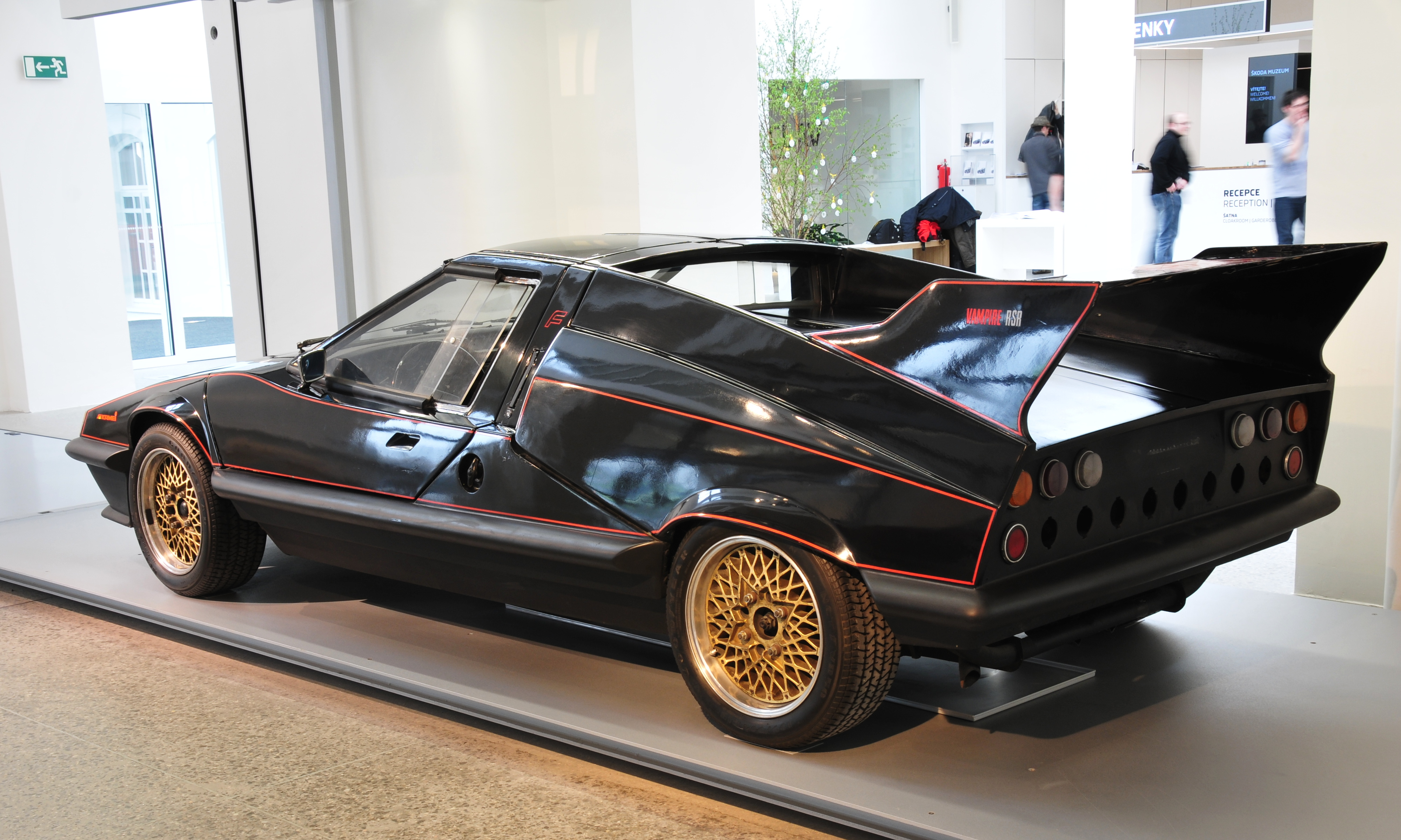
Rear view of the car

In 1981 it was repainted in black (with red lines around the edges) and received new front and rear fascias, the folding lights at the front were gone and replaced by two grouped into a rectangle, with a radiator grille between them; the rear lights were taken from the future Škoda 742 M and it got a new massive wing. The author of this Facelift was Theodor Pištěk. This modified car played a major role in the film The Ferat Vampire (1981), making it known as "Ferat". He could also be seen in the movie The Great Movie Heist (1986) and in a white version in the movie Tomorrow I'll Wake Up and Scald Myself with Tea (1977).

It can be seen in the Škoda Auto Museum in Mladá Boleslav.

== Technical specifications ==
- Wheelbase: 2500 mm
- Dimensions: 4060 × 1640 × 1120 mm
- Weight: 898 kg
- Wheels/Tires: 13" tires Barum 175 SR / Dunlop Racing
- Engine: modified Škoda 110 Rallye engine with increased power, in-line four-cylinder with OHV distribution, double carburetor Weber 40 DCOE2
- Displacement: 1107 cm³ / 1147 cm³
- Power output: 54 kW (73 hp) / 76.5 kW (104 hp)
- Maximum speed in km/h: 180 / 211.5
- Acceleration from 0 to 100 km/h: 15.3 / 12.6
- Luggage compartment: 0.35 m³
- Brakes: front disc, rear drum
