= Aaron Michael Metchik =

American actor

- Born: April 22, 1980 (age 46); San Clemente, California, USA
- Occupations: Actor; writer; director
- Years active: 1991 – 1999; 2009 – 2012

Aaron Michael Metchik (born April 22, 1980), also credited as Aaron Metchik, is an American former actor, writer, and director, known for his role as Steven Floyd Torkelson on The Torkelsons and as Jeremy in Trading Mom.

== Biography ==
Metchik's acting debut was as Steven Floyd Torkelson from 1991 to 1992 on the Oklahoma-set series The Torkelsons. When the show was spun off into Almost Home the next year, two of the five children were inexplicably written off the show, including Metchik's character. Since then, Metchik has had several guest-starring roles on television, as well as various film roles, his largest role being that of Alan Gray in the 1995 film The Baby-Sitters Club, the adaptation of the popular novel series. He has also had various voice roles, including a recurring role of Jack Pumpkinhead Jr. in several straight-to-video The Oz Kids films, and that of Ithicles in the 1997 Disney film Hercules. In 1999, Metchik made his directorial debut with the short film Jenny, which won the 2000 Reel Frontier Award for Best Long Short Take. He wrote, produced, directed, and starred in Ten Years Later, a film which released in 2010.

After his last film, More Than Stars, released in 2012, Metchick became a full time acting coach, running his acting program Actor's Edge out of Los Angeles and San Luis Obispo.

Metchick attended Shell Beach Elementary School and Judkins Middle School in Pismo Beach and Arroyo Grande High School in Arroyo Grande, California. His brother is actor Asher Metchik. His mother, Robyn Metchik, connected Zac Efron with a talent agent, effectively launching Efron's career.

== Filmography ==
Year	Title	Role	Notes
1991	Big Deals	Brian	TV movie
1991–1992	The Torkelsons	Steven Floyd Torkelson	Main role
1992	The Magic Paintbrush	Nib	Voice
1993	Wild Palms	Peter	Miniseries
1993	When Love Kills: The Seduction of John Hearn	Sky	TV movie
1994	Dr. Quinn, Medicine Woman	Nick	Episode: "Orphan Train"
1994	Duckman		Voice, episode: "Ride the High School"
1994	Trading Mom	Jeremy Martin	
1994	Aaahh!!! Real Monsters	Kid #3	Voice, episode: "The Switching Hour"
1995	VR.5	Stuart Fischer	Episode: "Dr. Strangechild"
1995	The Baby-Sitters Club	Alan Gray	
1995	Life with Louie	The Lanza Triplets	Voice, episode: "Lake Winnibigoshish"
1996	ABC Afterschool Specials	Todd	Episode: "Me and My Hormones"
1996	Boy Meets World	Jake	Episode: "Life Lessons"
1996	Party of Five	Othello	Episode: "Spring Breaks: Part 2"
1996	Feeling Minnesota	Young Sam Clayton	
1996	The Oz Kids Christmas in Oz	Jack Pumpkinhead Jr.	Voice, direct to video
1996	The Oz Kids Return of Mombi	Jack Pumpkinhead Jr.	Voice, direct to video
1996	The Oz Kids The Nome Prince and the Magic Belt	Jack Pumpkinhead Jr.	Voice, direct to video
1996	The Oz Kids Toto Lost in New York	Jack Pumpkinhead Jr.	Voice, direct to video
1996	The Oz Kids Virtual Oz	Jack Pumpkinhead Jr.	Voice, direct to video
1996	The Oz Kids Underground Adventure	Jack Pumpkinhead Jr.	Voice, direct to video
1997	The Oz Kids Journey Beneath the Sea	Jack Pumpkinhead Jr.	Voice, direct to video
1997	Hercules	Ithicles	Voice
1997	You Wish	Mitch	Episode: "Genie Without a Cause"
1999	Pumpkin Hill	Alex	
1999	The Practice	Brent Jones	Episode: "Lawyers, Reporters and Cockroaches"
2009	Dorm Life	Terry	Episode: "Marshall's New Plan"
2010	10 Years Later	Adam Huffman	
2012	More Than Stars	Quinn	
