= A Child's Wish =

- Genre: Drama
- Written by: Susan Nanus
- Directed by: Waris Hussein
- Starring: John Ritter; Tess Harper; Anna Chlumsky; Sarah Chalke; President Bill Clinton
- Music by: Stacy Widelitz
- Country of origin: United States
- Original language: English

Production
- Producers: Michelle MacLaren; Susan Nanus
- Cinematography: Henry M. Lebo
- Editor: Ron Spang
- Running time: 96 minutes
- Production company: O'Hara-Horowitz Productions

Original release
- Network: CBS
- Release: January 21, 1997

A Child's Wish is a 1997 American made-for-television drama film based on actual events. John Ritter stars as a father of a terminally ill 16-year-old girl portrayed by Anna Chlumsky.

== Plot ==
Ritter portrays Ed Chandler, a father who is fired from his job for taking time off to tend to his 16-year-old daughter Missy (Chlumsky), who is battling cancer. Rather than accepting his dismissal, Ed decides to fight back. With the help of a United States senator, he lobbies the United States Congress and is the stimulus to passage of the Family and Medical Leave Act. Because Missy's cancer is life-threatening, she is visited by the Make-A-Wish Foundation, and she wishes to go to the White House, visit the Oval Office, and hopefully see President Bill Clinton. Although Make-A-Wish is not so sure if they can grant her wish, in the end she does in fact get to visit the Oval Office and meet President Bill Clinton, playing himself in a cameo appearance.

Missy is based on the merging of two women, Melissa Weaver and Dixie Yandle. Ed Chandler's character is very closely related to George Yandle, who with his wife Vicki, helped push the Family Medical Leave Act through Congress after being fired from their jobs to care for their daughter Dixie who was suffering with cancer. In real life, Vicki Yandle was on stage with President Clinton when the law was signed.

== Cast ==
- John Ritter as Ed Chandler
- Tess Harper as Joanna Chandler
- Anna Chlumsky as Missy Chandler
- Sarah Chalke as Melinda
- Karl David-Djerf as Scott
- Kevin McNulty as Robbie
- President Bill Clinton as Himself
- David Lewis as Rick
- Janine Cox as Karen
- Aurelio Dinunzio as Hank
- Merrilyn Gann as Dr. Cross
- Eva De Viveiros as Jenny
- Freda Perry as Lucille
- Michael St. John Smith as Bailey
- Teryl Rothery as Donna
