= Anna Chlumsky =

American actress (born 1980)

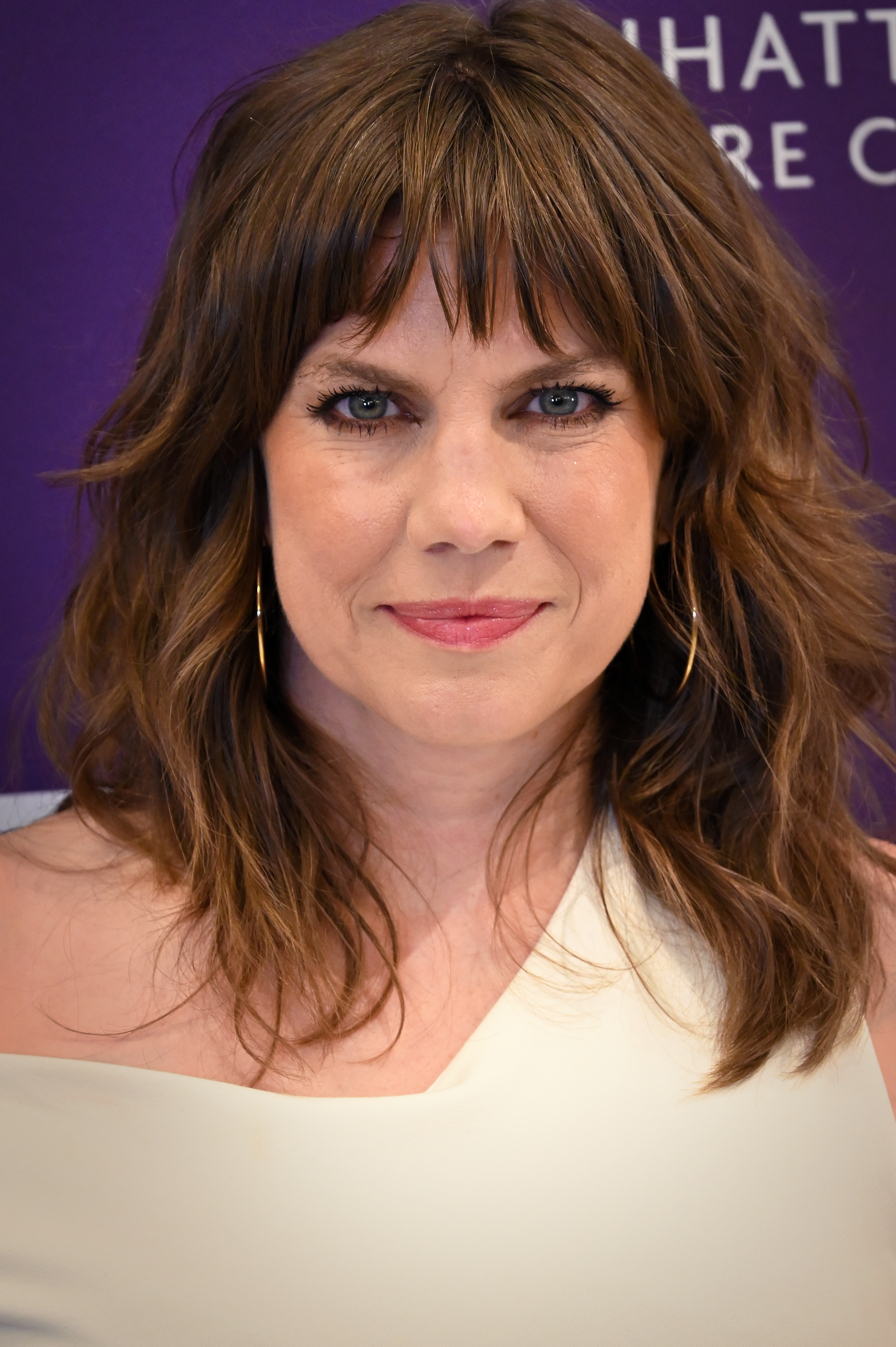
- Chlumsky in 2025
- Born: Anna Maria Chlumsky; December 3, 1980 (age 45); Chicago, Illinois, U.S.
- Education: University of Chicago (BA); Atlantic Acting School
- Occupation: Actress
- Years active: 1989–1998; 2005–present
- Spouse: Shaun So (m. 2008)
- Children: 2

Anna Maria Chlumsky (/ˈklʌmski/ KLUM-skee; born December 3, 1980) is an American actress. She began acting as a child, and first became known for playing Vada Sultenfuss in the film My Girl (1991) and its sequel, My Girl 2 (1994). Following her early roles, she went on hiatus from 1999 to 2005 to attend college. Chlumsky returned to acting with roles in several independent films, including Blood Car (2007) and In the Loop (2009). She portrayed Amy Brookheimer on the HBO television series Veep (2012–2019), which earned her six nominations for the Primetime Emmy Award for Outstanding Supporting Actress in a Comedy Series, among other accolades.

== Early life ==
Chlumsky was born December 3, 1980 in Chicago, Illinois, the daughter of Nancy (née Zunčić), a singer, actress, and former flight attendant, and Frank Chlumsky Jr., a chef and saxophonist. She was raised in a Catholic family, and is of Czech and Croatian descent. She has one half-brother.

Chlumsky attended Grace Lutheran School in River Forest, Illinois, and graduated from Walther Lutheran High School in Melrose Park.

== Career ==
Chlumsky entered show business at an early age, modeling with her mother in an advertising campaign; it was her lead roles in My Girl (1991) and My Girl 2 (1994) that earned her praise for her acting. Her initial film role was a bit part in the family comedy Uncle Buck (1989), starring John Candy and her eventual My Girl co-star Macaulay Culkin. She also appeared in Trading Mom (1994) with Sissy Spacek, and in Gold Diggers: The Secret of Bear Mountain (1995) with Christina Ricci. Throughout the 1990s, Chlumsky starred in several films and TV series.

Chlumsky took a break from acting to attend the University of Chicago, graduating with a Bachelor of Arts in International Studies in 2002. After college, she was hired as a fact-checker for the Zagat Survey and moved to New York City, which was followed by a position as an editorial assistant for a HarperCollins science fiction-fantasy imprint. However, she felt her career in the publishing industry was lackluster and unsatisfying, and ultimately returned to acting after she completed formal training at the Atlantic Acting School in Manhattan.

Chlumsky appeared as Mary Calvin in a 2007 episode of Law & Order; and as Lisa Klein in 2010 episode. She appeared in the 30 Rock episode "The Fighting Irish" as Liz Lemler, a romantic rival of protagonist Liz Lemon, who receives flowers meant for Lemler. Chlumsky was in four episodes of the ABC dramedy Cupid in 2009. Later that year, she starred in the Lifetime movie 12 Men of Christmas as Jan Lucas.

She starred in the Off Broadway production of Unconditional by Brett C. Leonard at The Public Theater, which opened in February 2008; it was produced by the LAByrinth Theater Company. She also starred in Lanford Wilson's Balm in Gilead in 2005 at the American Theatre of Actors in New York City.

In 2009, she appeared in Armando Iannucci's BBC Films political satire In the Loop, co-starring with Peter Capaldi, Tom Hollander, Chris Addison, James Gandolfini, and Mimi Kennedy, a quasi-spinoff of Iannucci's BBC TV series The Thick of It. She plays Liza, a State Department assistant in the movie.

From 2012 to 2019, Chlumsky played Amy Brookheimer, aide to Julia Louis-Dreyfus's character in HBO's Veep, also produced by Iannucci. In June 2012, she starred in the world premiere of David Adjmi's 3C at the Rattlestick Playwrights Theater in New York.

Dan Aykroyd, who played her father in the two My Girl films, has said that a script for a third film has been in development since 2003. In 2012, Chlumsky "put to rest" any rumors that such a film was in development. In addition to her role on Veep, Chlumsky has appeared in multiple television series between 2011 and 2013, including White Collar, Law & Order: Special Victims Unit, and NBC's adaptation of Hannibal.

Chlumsky has appeared on Broadway in You Can't Take It with You, and beginning in 2015 as editor Iris Peabody in the comedy Living on Love, with Renee Fleming, Jerry O'Connell and Douglas Sills.

In 2017, Chlumsky appeared in the fourth season of AMC Networks' Halt and Catch Fire as Dr. Katie Herman, the love interest of Gordon Clark (Scoot McNairy).

Chlumsky had a main role alongside Julia Garner in Shonda Rhimes' Netflix limited drama series Inventing Anna. Chlumsky voices Charlotte Pickles in the 2021 Paramount+ revival of Rugrats.

== Personal life ==
In October 2007, Chlumsky announced her engagement to Army Reserve member Shaun So, who served a tour of duty in Afghanistan. They met as students at the University of Chicago in 2000. They married on March 8, 2008, in Brooklyn, and have two daughters, born July 2013 and August 2016.

== Filmography ==
=== Film ===
Year	Title	Role	Notes
1989	Uncle Buck	School Child	Small Role
1991	My Girl	Vada Sultenfuss	
1994	My Girl 2	Vada Sultenfuss	
1994	Trading Mom	Elizabeth Martin	
1995	Gold Diggers: The Secret of Bear Mountain	Jody Salerno	
2005	Wait	Cara	Short film
2007	Blood Car	Lorraine	
2008	Eavesdrop	Chelsea	
2009	In the Loop	Liza Weld	
2009	The Good Guy	Lisa	
2009	My Sweet Misery	Chloe	
2010	Civil Unions: A Love Story	Unnamed	Short film
2011	The Pill	Nelly	
2012	Bert and Arnie's Guide to Friendship	Sabrina	
2015	The End of the Tour	Sarah	
2019	Hala	Shannon Taylor	
2022	They/Them	Molly Erickson / Angie Phelps	
2025	On the End	Jess Finch	
2025	Bride Hard	Virginia	

=== Television ===
Year	Title	Role	Notes
1997	A Child's Wish	Missy Chandler	Television film
1997	Miracle in the Woods	Gina Weatherby / Field Pea	Television film
1998	Cupid	Jill	Episode: "Meat Market"
1998	Early Edition	Megan Clark	Episode: "Teen Angels"
2007	Eight Days a Week	Riley McGann	Unaired series
2007	30 Rock	Liz Lemler	Episode: "The Fighting Irish"
2007, 2010	Law & Order	Mary Calvin / Lisa Klein	2 episodes: "Charity Case" & "Innocence"
2009	House Rules	Scotty Fisher	Television film
2009	Cupid	Josie	4 episodes; reworking of original Cupid series
2009	12 Men of Christmas	Jan Lucas	Television film
2010	The Quinn-tuplets	Rachel Quinn	Unsold pilot
2010	Covert Affairs	Vivian Long	Episode: "I Can't Quit You Baby"
2011	Lights Out	Charlie	2 episodes: "Headgames" & "The Shot"
2011	Three Weeks, Three Kids	Jennifer Mills	Television film
2011	White Collar	Agent Melissa Matthews	2 episodes: "Where There's a Will" & "Countdown"
2012–2019	Veep	Amy Brookheimer	65 episodes; Main role (Seasons 1–7)
2012	Army Wives	Jessica Anderson	Episode: "Tough Love"
2012	Law & Order: Special Victims Unit	Jocelyn Paley	Episode: "Twenty-Five Acts"
2013–2014	Hannibal	Miriam Lass	4 episodes
2016	Robot Chicken	Kelly / Nurse (voice)	Episode: "Western Hay Batch"
2017	Halt and Catch Fire	Dr. Katie Herman	5 episodes
2021–2026	Rugrats	Charlotte Pickles (voice)	Main role
2022	Inventing Anna	Vivian Kent	Main role
2024	Evil	Ellie / Laura	Episode: "Fear of the Future"
2025	Smoke	Special Agent Dawn Hudson	4 episodes
2026	Line of Fire	Deputy Libby	Episode: "Pilot"

== Accolades ==
Award/association	Year	Category	Nominated work	Result	Ref.
Chicago Film Critics Association	1992	Most Promising Actress	My Girl	Nominated	
Critics' Choice Television Awards	2016	Best Supporting Actress in a Comedy Series	Veep	Nominated	
Gold Derby Awards	2014	Best Supporting Actress – Comedy	Veep	Nominated	
Gold Derby Awards	2015	Best Supporting Actress – Comedy	Veep	Won	
Gold Derby Awards	2016	Best Supporting Actress – Comedy	Veep	Nominated	
Gold Derby Awards	2017	Best Supporting Actress – Comedy	Veep	Nominated	
Gold Derby Awards	2019	Best Supporting Actress – Comedy	Veep	Nominated	
Gold Derby Awards	2019	Best Supporting Actress of the Decade – Comedy	Veep	Nominated	
Golden Raspberry Awards	2026	Worst Supporting Actress	Bride Hard	Nominated	
Gracie Awards	2015	Outstanding Female Actor in a Supporting Role in a Comedy or Musical	Veep	Won	
MTV Movie Awards	1992	Best Kiss (shared with Macaulay Culkin)	My Girl	Won	
MTV Movie Awards	1992	Best On-Screen Duo (shared with Culkin)	My Girl	Nominated	
MTV Movie Awards	1992	Breakthrough Performance	My Girl	Nominated	
Online Film & Television Association	2012	Best Supporting Actress in a Comedy	Veep	Nominated	
Online Film & Television Association	2013	Best Supporting Actress in a Comedy	Veep	Nominated	
Online Film & Television Association	2014	Best Supporting Actress in a Comedy	Veep	Nominated	
Online Film & Television Association	2015	Best Supporting Actress in a Comedy	Veep	Nominated	
Online Film & Television Association	2016	Best Supporting Actress in a Comedy	Veep	Nominated	
Online Film & Television Association	2017	Best Supporting Actress in a Comedy	Veep	Nominated	
Primetime Emmy Awards	2013	Outstanding Supporting Actress in a Comedy Series	Veep	Nominated	
Primetime Emmy Awards	2014	Outstanding Supporting Actress in a Comedy Series	Veep	Nominated	
Primetime Emmy Awards	2015	Outstanding Supporting Actress in a Comedy Series	Veep	Nominated	
Primetime Emmy Awards	2016	Outstanding Supporting Actress in a Comedy Series	Veep	Nominated	
Primetime Emmy Awards	2017	Outstanding Supporting Actress in a Comedy Series	Veep	Nominated	
Primetime Emmy Awards	2019	Outstanding Supporting Actress in a Comedy Series	Veep	Nominated	
Screen Actors Guild Awards	2014	Outstanding Performance by an Ensemble in a Comedy Series	Veep	Nominated	
Screen Actors Guild Awards	2015	Outstanding Performance by an Ensemble in a Comedy Series	Veep	Nominated	
Screen Actors Guild Awards	2016	Outstanding Performance by an Ensemble in a Comedy Series	Veep	Nominated	
Screen Actors Guild Awards	2017	Outstanding Performance by an Ensemble in a Comedy Series	Veep	Nominated	
Screen Actors Guild Awards	2018	Outstanding Performance by an Ensemble in a Comedy Series	Veep	Won	
Young Artist Awards	1992	Most Promising Young Newcomer	My Girl	Won	
Young Artist Awards	1994	Best Performance by a Young Actress Starring in a Motion Picture	My Girl 2	Won	
Young Artist Awards	1995	Best Young Leading Actress – Feature Film	Gold Diggers: The Secret of Bear Mountain	Won	
Young Artist Awards	1997	Best Performance in a TV Movie/Pilot/Mini-Series – Leading Young Actress	A Child's Wish	Nominated	
Young Artist Awards	1998	Best Performance in a TV Comedy Series – Guest Starring Young Actress	Cupid	Won	
