= Trading Mom =

1994 film by Tia Brelis

- Theatrical release poster
- Directed by: Tia Brelis
- Screenplay by: Tia Brelis
- Based on: The Mummy Market by Nancy Brelis
- Produced by: Raffaella De Laurentiis
- Starring: Sissy Spacek; Anna Chlumsky; Aaron Michael Metchik; Asher Metchik; André the Giant; Maureen Stapleton
- Cinematography: Buzz Feitshans IV
- Edited by: Isaac Seyahek
- Music by: David Kitay
- Production company: First Look International
- Distributed by: Trimark Pictures
- Release date: May 13, 1994
- Running time: 82 minutes
- Country: United States
- Language: English
- Box office: $319,123

Trading Mom (also known as The Mommy Market) is a 1994 American fantasy comedy film written and directed by Tia Brelis, based on her mother Nancy Brelis' 1966 book The Mummy Market. It stars Sissy Spacek, Anna Chlumsky, Aaron Michael Metchik, Maureen Stapleton, and André the Giant in his final film appearance. It grossed $319,123 at the box office and received mostly negative reviews from critics.

== Plot ==
Jeremy, Elizabeth, and Harry Martin are three children who are annoyed with their "nagging" single mother, a divorced and strict workaholic who the kids see as rarely spending quality time with them ever since their father had left them for an unknown reason.

During their disastrous last day of school, Principal Terrance Leeby busts Jeremy for defending Harry against the school bully (who gets off scot-free), Harry for doing nothing wrong, and Elizabeth for holding (but not smoking) a friend's cigarette. He contacts Mrs. Martin and schedules an appointment for a home visit on the first day of summer vacation.

The children go to Mrs. Cavour, a mysterious elderly woman who works as a gardener and had befriended the siblings some time ago. She tells them of an ancient spell that will make their mother disappear along with all their memories of her. Upon returning home, they are grounded with no camp, allowance, TV or anything else fun by their infuriated mother.

That evening while getting ready for bed, the children recite the spell, which works overnight. The next morning, Principal Leeby shows up at their house to have a meeting with Mrs. Martin about the trouble her kids caused at school the previous day, but is dismissed as the Martin kids make up a story about her leaving for an emergency. Principal Leeby becomes suspicious and decides to contact social services after learning that the Martin siblings are hiding something from him. Mrs. Cavour tells them of a place in town called the Mommy Market, where any mother imaginable can be found. However, every customer receives three tokens and if a customer does not find a suitable mother before running out of tokens, they can never return.

Jeremy, Elizabeth, and Harry select a wealthy French woman; a competitive nature hiker; and a Russian circus performer. They dislike them all and find them wanting in their care or dedication as mothers. After the third mother leaves and hearing that Principal Leeby has contacted the social worker, who suggests to put the three kids in separate foster homes, they seek out Mrs. Cavour again. She explains that the spell can be broken if they collectively recall something about Mrs. Martin.

After being banned from the Mommy Market forever and discovering that Principal Leeby has contacted the police to investigate their mother's disappearance as well as finding them to put them in foster homes, each child remembers a fun memory with their mother, which brings her back to life.

They find it to be the first day of summer again; the day after they recited the spell. Everyone is happy as the children make their mother breakfast and embrace her while she informs them that Principal Leeby is coming over for a visit.

Shortly before the credits Principal Leeby reappears and is about to have a chat with Mrs. Martin about the problems her kids caused at school, only to be snared by an animal trap that the nature-hiker mother had made to capture a raccoon.

== Cast ==
- Sissy Spacek as Mrs. Martin/Mama, the snappy French woman/Mom, the nature-hiker/mom, the circus performer/Natasha
- Anna Chlumsky as Elizabeth Martin
- Aaron Michael Metchik as Jeremy Martin
- Asher Metchik (Aaron's real-life brother) as Harry Martin
- Maureen Stapleton as Mrs. Cavour
- André the Giant as the Circus Strongman
- Merritt Yohnka as Principal Terrance Leeby
- Sean MacLaughlin as Edward, the Mommy Market's manager
- Schuyler Fisk (Sissy's real-life daughter) as Suzy
- Anne Shannon Baxter as Lily
- Andrew Largen as Ricky Turner, the school bully
- Nancy Chlumsky (Anna's real-life mother) as Dr. Gloria Richardson, the social worker
- Ariana Metchik (Aaron and Asher's real-life sister) as the Girl Scout
- Igor De Laurentiis (producer Rafaella's real-life nephew) as the boy in the black jacket

== Production ==
Trading Mom was filmed in Richmond, Virginia in 1992.

== Home media ==
Vidmark Entertainment released the film on VHS on October 18, 1994.

== Reception ==
On the review aggregator website Rotten Tomatoes, 38% of 8 critics' reviews are positive, with an average rating of 5.2/10.

The film was mentioned in Siskel and Ebert's Worst of 1994 episode. Siskel personally chose it; both he and Ebert gave the picture two thumbs down, describing it as "Depressing...too dreary and lame to be any fun...All of Spacek's multiple roles are disturbing and awkward; as a result, so is the film." Film critics Jeffrey Lyons and Michael Medved of Sneak Previews ranked the film number 10 and 7, respectively, on their lists of the worst films of 1994.

Film critic and historian Leonard Maltin gave the film one-and-a-half (out of a possible four) stars, saying: "This should have been a whimsical fantasy/morality lesson; instead, it's flat and lifeless, with poor production values. Although Spacek has a field day in four wildly different variations on a single role, the humiliation scenes will make you wince. There's always something wrong with a film that sits unreleased for two years, as this one did".
