= Howard Zieff =

American director and photographer (1927–2009)

- Born: Howard Burton Zieff; 21 October 1927; Chicago, Illinois, U.S.
- Died: 22 February 2009 (aged 81); Los Angeles, California, U.S.
- Occupation: Film director

Howard Burton Zieff (October 21, 1927 – February 22, 2009) (pronounced Zeef) was an American director, television commercial director, and advertising photographer.

== Early life ==
Zieff was born to Jewish parents in Chicago, Illinois, then moved to Los Angeles, California with his family.

== Career ==
He studied art for one year at Los Angeles City College, then dropped out in 1946 to join the United States Navy. He learned photography at the Naval Photography School in Pensacola, Florida and then, after his discharge, at the Art Center College of Design in Pasadena. He became a commercial photographer in New York City in the 1950s, earning a reputation in the 1960s as one of the city's best-known advertising photographers. His campaigns included "You Don't Have To Be Jewish" for Levy's rye bread, "Mamma Mia, that's a spicy meatball" for Alka-Seltzer, and ads for the New York Daily News, Polaroid, and Volkswagen. His advertising was known for its humor as well as its high production values; for a Hertz rental-car ad, he commissioned the construction of a facsimile of West Hollywood's Sunset Strip, while an ad for Tetley tea included locating old Spitfire planes.

In 1969, Zieff sold his company to Columbia Pictures in order to focus on filmmaking. After the release of My Girl 2 in 1994, Zieff retired from directing as he became increasingly debilitated by Parkinson's disease.

== Death ==
Zieff died aged 81 at Cedars-Sinai Medical Center in Los Angeles at 8:10 am on Sunday, February 22, 2009, with his wife (retired motion picture literary agent) Ronda Gomez-Quinones at his side. Private Benjamin star Goldie Hawn was among those to pay tribute to him, saying he had a "special talent for directing comedies, always a rare gift. What I remember and cherish most was his humour and love of laughter." He is interred at Mount Sinai Memorial Park Cemetery in the Hollywood Hills of Los Angeles.

== Filmography ==
Year	Title	Director	Executive producer
1973	Slither	Yes	No
1975	Hearts of the West	Yes	No
1978	House Calls	Yes	No
1979	The Main Event	Yes	No
1980	Private Benjamin	Yes	No
1984	Unfaithfully Yours	Yes	No
1989	The Dream Team	Yes	No
1991	My Girl	Yes	No
1994	My Girl 2	Yes	Yes
