= Sex and Breakfast =

- DVD cover
- Directed by: Miles Brandman
- Written by: Miles Brandman
- Produced by: Michael Brandman; Chip Diggins; Andrew Adelson
- Starring: Macaulay Culkin; Kuno Becker; Eliza Dushku; Alexis Dziena
- Cinematography: Mark Schwartzbard
- Edited by: Dana Shockley
- Distributed by: First Look Pictures
- Release date: November 30, 2007
- Running time: 81 minutes
- Country: United States
- Language: English

Sex and Breakfast is a 2007 independent dark comedy film starring Macaulay Culkin, Eliza Dushku, Alexis Dziena and Kuno Becker. Shooting took place in September 2006. The film opened in Los Angeles November 30, 2007, and was released on DVD on January 22, 2008 by First Look Pictures. The film was directed by first-time director Miles Brandman.

== Plot ==
Young couples experiment with anonymous group sex as a way to revitalize their troubled relationships. Through the experience they are forced to rethink the rudiments of a successful relationship: sex, love, and communication.

One couple, James and Heather, have lost the spark in their relationship; a cold distance has grown between them and their intimate moments feel forced. Heather is a take-charge problem solver who sometimes gets too carried away for her own good. James, meanwhile, has recently discovered that he is easily manipulated.

Another couple, Ellis and Renee, fear that they are at the beginning of the end of their relationship. Renee is thoughtful and honest, but recently she has found herself feeling slightly isolated and bored with Ellis, who puts on a brash, macho front to disguise his insecurity.

Both couples seek therapy with Dr. Wellbridge, who offers them experimental treatment to rekindle their foundering relationships. On the doctor's orders, the couples embark on a partner swap that leaves some thrilled and others thwarted, but the truth about their relationships is revealed to all four.

== Cast ==
- Macaulay Culkin as James
- Kuno Becker as Ellis
- Eliza Dushku as Renee
- Alexis Dziena as Heather
- Joanna Miles as Dr. Wellbridge
- Eric Lively as Charlie
- Jaime Ray Newman as Betty
- Tracie Thoms as Sarah, Female Tenant
- Anita Gnan as Mickey
- Robert Carradine as Angry Driver
- John Pleshette as Older Man In Elevator
- Maree Cheatham as Older Woman In Elevator
- Vincent Jerosa as Brian
- Margaret Travolta as Gail
