= My Girl (film) =

1991 film by Howard Zieff

- Theatrical release poster
- Directed by: Howard Zieff
- Written by: Laurice Elehwany
- Produced by: Brian Grazer
- Starring: Dan Aykroyd; Jamie Lee Curtis; Macaulay Culkin; Anna Chlumsky; Griffin Dunne
- Cinematography: Paul Elliott
- Edited by: Wendy Greene Bricmont
- Music by: James Newton Howard
- Production company: Imagine Entertainment
- Distributed by: Columbia Pictures
- Release date: November 27, 1991
- Running time: 102 minutes
- Country: United States
- Language: English
- Budget: $17 million
- Box office: $121.5 million

My Girl is a 1991 American coming-of-age romantic comedy-drama film directed by Howard Zieff, written by Laurice Elehwany, and starring Dan Aykroyd, Jamie Lee Curtis, Macaulay Culkin, and Anna Chlumsky in her first role in a major motion picture. Set during the summer of 1972, the film follows Vada Sultenfuss, an 11-year-old girl being raised by her widowed funeral director father in her town's funeral home as she navigates her first romance, fear of mortality, and her close friendship with her male classmate, Thomas. The film's title refers to the classic 1964 song of the same name by The Temptations, which is also featured in the film's end credits.

The film was released by Columbia Pictures on November 27, 1991, and grossed $121 million on a budget of $17 million. A book adaptation based on the film was written by Patricia Hermes. A sequel, My Girl 2, was released in 1994.

== Plot ==
Vada Sultenfuss is an 11-year-old girl living in Madison, Pennsylvania in the summer of 1972. Her widowed father, Harry Sultenfuss, operates the town's funeral parlor, which is also their home. Her upbringing leads her to suffer from hypochondria and develop an obsession with death, which her father fails to understand. Also living with them are "Gramoo", Vada's paternal grandmother, whose recent dementia accentuates Vada's worries, and Harry's older brother and Vada's paternal uncle Phil.

Vada hangs out with Thomas J. Sennett, an unpopular boy her age who is allergic to "everything". Other girls tease them, thinking they are more than just friends. Thomas J. often accompanies Vada when she visits the doctor, who assures her that she is not sick.

During the summer, Vada befriends Shelly DeVoto, the new makeup artist at the funeral parlor, who provides her with guidance. Vada has a crush on Mr. Bixler, her fifth-grade teacher, and hears about an adult poetry writing class he is teaching. Wondering how to pay for the class, she takes money from a cookie jar in Shelly's camper. During her first class, when suggested to write about what is in her soul, Vada fears that she killed her mother, who died two days after childbirth.

When Harry and Shelly start dating, Vada's attitude towards Shelly changes. One night, she follows them to a bingo game and brings Thomas J. along to disrupt it. On the Fourth of July, when Shelly's ex-husband Danny shows up, Vada hopes that Shelly will take him back, to no avail.

Following the holiday, Vada and Thomas J. knock down a beehive in the woods. Vada loses her mood ring in the process, and while they look for it, the bees swarm and force them to run away. Harry invites Vada and Shelly to a carnival; she becomes distressed when he and Shelly announce their engagement there, so she proposes bumper cars so she can release her frustration by ramming her repeatedly. Later, it leads her to contemplate running away.

Later, Vada screams when she sees that she is bleeding, but Shelly explains that she is experiencing her first period. As Vada accepts that this happens only to girls, she angrily rebuffs Thomas J. when he comes to visit. A couple of days later, the friends sit under a willow tree, wondering what a first kiss feels like, so they share one.

After Vada heads home, Thomas J. returns to the woods to search for her mood ring. Unaware that the beehive they knocked down is still active, he is killed by the bees due to his allergy.

Harry delivers the tragic news to Vada, who stays in her bedroom for a full day. Shelly suggests that he console Vada, but he brushes her off. Shelly urges him to realize the significance of his daughter's pain. When Vada leaves her bedroom and sees Thomas J.'s body in his casket, she runs away out of grief to Mr. Bixler's house, wanting to stay with him, but flees after discovering that he is engaged.

Vada grieves by the willow tree where she and Thomas J. hung out. When she returns home, everyone is relieved, including Shelly, whom Vada begins to accept as her future stepmother. Her grief also mends the rift between her and her father, who assures Vada that her mother's death was not her fault.

Toward the end of summer, Vada and her father comfort Mrs. Sennett, who still struggles with her son's death. She returns Vada's mood ring, which Thomas J. had found. On the last day of her writing class, Vada reads a poem in memory of her best friend.

== Cast ==
- Dan Aykroyd as Harry Sultenfuss
- Jamie Lee Curtis as Shelly DeVoto
- Macaulay Culkin as Thomas J. Sennett
- Anna Chlumsky as Vada Margaret Sultenfuss
- Richard Masur as Phil Sultenfuss
- Ray Buktenica as Danny DeVoto
- Griffin Dunne as Mr. Jake Bixler
- Peter Michael Goetz as Dr. Welty
- Ann Nelson as Gramoo Sultenfuss
- Tom Villard as Justin
- Anthony R. Jones as Arthur
- Glenda Chism as Mrs. Sennett
- Bill Cordell as Mr. Sennett

== Production ==
=== Development ===
The screenplay, written by Laurice Elehwany, was originally titled Born Jaundiced, and was purchased by Imagine Entertainment in July 1990. On August 24, 1990, it was reported in Daily Variety that the screenplay had been re-titled to I Am Woman, but was subsequently changed to its final title, My Girl, in the spring of 1991. Elehwany based the fictional setting of Madison on the small towns in southwestern Pennsylvania where she grew up.

=== Casting ===
Culkin and Chlumsky were cast in the lead roles of Thomas J. and Vada, respectively, in January 1991. Filming took place in Bartow and Sanford, Florida beginning in February 1991.

=== Filming ===
Though set in Pennsylvania, My Girl was filmed in the Florida towns of Sanford, Winter Haven, Plant City, Clermont, and Bartow. Exteriors of the Sultenfuss home were supplied by a real Victorian home in Bartow, while the house's interiors were built on a soundstage in Orlando. Principal photography was completed in March 1991.

== Release ==
When My Girl was submitted to the Motion Picture Association of America (MPAA) in September 1991, it was rated PG-13. Later that month, the film's producers won an appeal to have the film reclassified to a PG rating.

My Girl was released on November 27, 1991.

== Reception ==
=== Box office ===
My Girl opened at No. 2 with $12,391,783, grossing $59,489,799 domestically, and $62 million internationally for a worldwide total of $121,489,799.

=== Critical response ===
The film holds a 57% score on Rotten Tomatoes based on 23 reviews. The site's consensus states: "My Girl has a mostly sweet story and a pair of appealing young leads, but it's largely undone by its aggressively tearjerking ending." Roger Ebert gave the film 3.5 stars out of 4, writing: "The beauty in this film is in its directness. There are some obligatory scenes. But there are also some very original and touching ones. This is a movie that has its heart in the right place." Owen Gleiberman of Entertainment Weekly praised Chlumsky's performance in the film, but conceded that "there's something discomforting about a movie that takes the experience of an audacious, conflicted child and reduces it to: She needs to Confront Her Feelings. My Girl has some sweet, funny moments (the cast is uniformly appealing), yet it unfolds in a landscape of paralyzing, pop-psych banality."

Film critic Caryn James cited the film as being part of a "trend toward stronger, more realistic themes in children's films", specifically its representations of death, specifically that of a young child. David Kehr of the Chicago Tribune wrote of the film: "If My Girl helps stimulate family discussions of death and loss, it will certainly have done some good in the world. But at the same time, its aesthetic interest is virtually nil... Though My Girl seeks to stir large, devastating emotions, Zieff seems afraid to touch on anything too difficult or unpleasant, lest it alienate his audience. The results are curiously gutless and unmoving, as Zieff finds himself stuck with a sentimentality without substance, a poetry without pain." Peter Rainer of the Los Angeles Times was similarly critical of the film's "syrupy" elements, concluding: "The mixture of winsomeness and deadpan frights in My Girl ought to be weirder and more interesting than it is. After all, a girl who survives a household where bodies are embalmed in the basement is the kind of plucky heroine that movies about kids need right now. Or movies about adults, for that matter."

Janet Maslin of The New York Times was critical of the screenplay for being made up of "loose ends bound together only by intimations of mortality and family crisis," summarizing: "It's not hard for the maudlin My Girl to make its audience weepy at the sight of America's favorite kid in an open coffin. But it is difficult for this film to mix the sugary unreality of a television show with such a clumsy and manipulative morbid streak." Variety noted: "Plenty of shrewd commercial calculation went into concocting the right sugar coating for this story of an 11-year-old girl's painful maturation, but [the] chemistry seems right."

== Music ==
The soundtrack of the film contains several 1960s and 1970s pop hits, in addition to the title song (by The Temptations), including "Wedding Bell Blues" (The 5th Dimension), "If You Don't Know Me by Now" (Harold Melvin & the Blue Notes), "Bad Moon Rising" (Creedence Clearwater Revival), "Good Lovin'" (The Rascals), and "Saturday in the Park" (Chicago). When Vada gets upset, she plugs her ears and sings "Do Wah Diddy Diddy", the Manfred Mann version of which is also included on the soundtrack album. In addition, Vada and Thomas J. play "The Name Game" and sing "Witch Doctor", while Vada has posters of the Broadway musical Hair, the Carpenters, and Donny Osmond on her bedroom wall.

=== Certifications ===
Region	Certification	Certified units/sales
Australia (ARIA)	Platinum	70,000^{^}
^{^} Shipments figures based on certification alone.

== See also ==
- 1970s nostalgia
