= Yough Senior High School =

Location
- 915 Lowber Road; Herminie, Pennsylvania 15637; United States
- Coordinates: 40.2606°N 79.7328°W

Information
- School type: public secondary
- School district: Yough School District
- Superintendent: Anthony DeMaro
- CEEB code: 391755
- Principal: Brian Sutherland
- Teaching staff: 46
- Grades: 9–12
- Gender: coed
- Enrollment: 696 (2016-17)
- Average class size: 15- 20
- Colors: green and orange
- Mascot: Cougar
- Team name: Cougars
- Yearbook: Reflections
- Website: https://yhs.youghsd.net/

Yough Senior High School is a high school located in the southeastern region of Westmoreland County, Pennsylvania, USA (Parents of Students/Staff/Educators). The school is operated by the Yough School District. Students attend from borough of West Newton and the townships of Sewickley and South Huntingdon. Yough High School has graduating class sizes from 180 to 200.
