= Ace Ventura (franchise) =

Media franchise created by Jack Bernstein

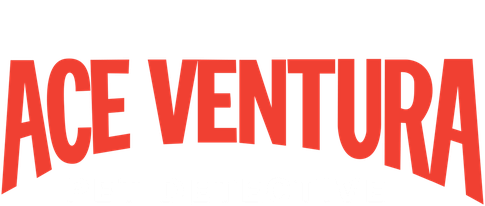
- Official franchise logo
- Created by: Jack Bernstein
- Original work: Ace Ventura: Pet Detective (1994)
- Owner: Morgan Creek Productions
- Years: 1994–present

Films and television
- Film(s): Ace Ventura: Pet Detective (1994); Ace Ventura: When Nature Calls (1995); Untitled Ace Ventura film (TBA)
- Animated series: Ace Ventura: Pet Detective (1995–2000)
- Television film(s): Ace Ventura Jr.: Pet Detective (2009)

The Ace Ventura franchise, originally created by Jack Bernstein, consists of American detective-comedies, with two theatrical films, one made-for-television film, and one animated television series. The overall story follows the criminal investigations of the titular and comedic pet detective.

While the first and second films were met with mixed reviews, they were successful at the box office and are credited with launching the career of Jim Carrey. The two films have earned the status of cult classics.

== Background ==
=== Ace Ventura ===
Bernstein later acknowledged that the concept for the character of Ace Ventura came from wanting to do a comedic version of Sherlock Holmes and watching the Stupid Pet Tricks segment on Late Night with David Letterman.

== Films ==
Film	U.S. release date	Director(s)	Screenwriter(s)	Story by	Producer(s)
Ace Ventura: Pet Detective	February 4, 1994	Tom Shadyac	Jack Bernstein, Tom Shadyac & Jim Carrey	Jack Bernstein	James G. Robinson
Ace Ventura: When Nature Calls	November 10, 1995	Steve Oedekerk	Steve Oedekerk	Steve Oedekerk	James G. Robinson
Ace Ventura Jr.: Pet Detective	March 1, 2009	David Mickey Evans	Jason Heimberg, Justin Heimberg, Jeffery Sank & David Mickey Evans	Jason Heimberg, Justin Heimberg & Jeffery Sank	James G. Robinson & David Robinson
Untitled Ace Ventura film	TBA	TBA	Pat Casey & Josh Miller	Pat Casey & Josh Miller	TBA

=== Ace Ventura: Pet Detective (1994) ===
Ace Ventura is hired to rescue Snowflake, the bottlenose dolphin mascot of the Miami Dolphins. Despite his best efforts to save Dan Marino, Ace is also kidnapped. When Ace finds out a murder is connected, he soon begins to suspect that disgraced football player Ray Finkle is behind it all. However, Ace can't find Finkle, until Ace discovers that Finkle has been masquerading as Lt. Lois Einhorn.

=== Ace Ventura: When Nature Calls (1995) ===
Ace is dispatched to Africa to investigate the disappearance of a sacred white bat battling his fear of bats along the way.

=== Ace Ventura Jr.: Pet Detective (2009) ===
Ace Ventura, Jr. follows in his father's footsteps in being a pet detective. Years ago his father has disappeared, after voyage through the Bermuda Triangle. Now a number of animals go missing, and his mother is placed in jail after suspicion of guilt is ordered. Ace works with a number of friends to uncover the true culprit, and rescue his mother from conviction.

=== Possible sequel ===
In December 2019, a third Ace Ventura film starring Jim Carrey was revealed to be in early development. By March 2021, the film was officially announced to be in development with Pat Casey and Josh Miller signed on as co-screenwriters. The project will be a joint-venture production within Morgan Creek Entertainment, Amazon MGM Studios, and Prime Video Original Films, with plans to be released simultaneously theatrically and via streaming as an Amazon Prime Video exclusive. In August of the same year, Carrey confirmed his involvement and stated that he was "more than ready for the next chapter". By April 2022 however, Carrey revealed that he was considering retiring from acting. The actor stated that "[he] might continue down the road, but [he's] taking a break from acting", while elaborating that if a script is presented to him that he feels like is needed to be created he may reconsider. Carrey later stated that while there are no official plans for the film, he joked that he would star in the film if Christopher Nolan was to direct. Since then, Jim Carrey has decided not to retire from acting following his great success from the Sonic The Hedgehog film series, for which he's made the most appearances in his film career, calling his short break more akin to "power-resting," and opening the door to possible future ventures.

== Television ==
Series	Season	Episodes	Originally released		Network	Showrunner
Series	Season	Episodes	First released	Last released	Network	Showrunner
Ace Ventura: Pet Detective	1	13	December 9, 1995	April 27, 1996	CBS	Duane Capizzi
Ace Ventura: Pet Detective	2	13	November 7, 1996	August 30, 1997	CBS	Duane Capizzi
Ace Ventura: Pet Detective	3	15	October 29, 1999	February 4, 2000	Nickelodeon	Duane Capizzi

=== Ace Ventura: Pet Detective (1995–2000) ===
An animated series, titled Ace Ventura: Pet Detective – The Animated Series, aired from December 1995 to February 2000. Created by Duane Capizzi for Warner Bros. Television, the first two seasons aired on CBS. In 1999, when reruns debuted on Nickelodeon, a third season was developed and aired. Many of the characters from the movie were retained, though voiced by a new cast. While the original movies had a strongly cartoon-style comedic aesthetic, the animated series is characterized by slapstick and children-friendly cartoon humor. Seth MacFarlane was among the writers over the course of the show's run, displaying similar humor to his later series.

The titular character, voiced by Canadian actor Michael Hall, continues his goofy antics as a private investigator for animals of all species. Despite running in a time slot after another popular Jim Carrey movie-based cartoon, The Mask: Animated Series, and debuting a crossover episode between the two series (with "The Aceman Cometh"), the series failed to garner enough views to be renewed. Ultimately, both The Mask and Ace Ventura were cancelled. A third season followed the cancellation, before once again being cancelled.

== Main cast and characters ==
- An ^{A} indicates an appearance through previously recorded material.
- A ^{U} indicates an actor or actress was uncredited for their role.
- A ^{V} indicates the actor or actress lent only his or her voice for his or her film character.
- A dark gray cell indicates the character was not in the film.

Character	Films			Animated series
Character	Ace Ventura: Pet Detective	Ace Ventura: When Nature Calls	Ace Ventura Jr.: Pet Detective	Ace Ventura: Pet Detective
Principal cast
Ace Ventura	Jim Carrey	Jim Carrey		Michael Hall^{V}
Spike	Binks^{U}	Binks^{U}		Richard Binsley^{V}
Melissa Robinson-Ventura	Courteney Cox		Ann Cusack	
Ray Finkle Lt. Lois Einhorn	Sean Young Uwe von Schamann^{A}^{Y}			
Fulton Greenwall		Ian McNeice		
Vincent Cadby		Simon Callow		
Prince Ouda		Maynard Eziashi		
The Grand Abbot		Arsenio "Sonny" Trinidad		
Ace Ventura Jr.			Josh Flitter	
Laura			Emma Lockhart	
Arnold "A-Plus" Plushinsky			Austin Rogers	
Quenton Pennington, Sr.			Brian Patrick Clarke	
Quenton Pennington, Jr.			Reed Alexander	
Supporting cast
Sgt. Aguado	John Capodice			Al Waxman^{V}
Emilio	Tone Loc			Bruce Tubbe^{V}
Woodstock	Raynor Scheine			D.G. Beatty^{V}
Mr. Shickadance	Mark Margolis			Vince Corazza^{V}
Dan Marino	Himself			
Vinnie	Frank Adonis			
Roc	Tiny Ron			
Roger Podacter	Troy Evans			
Ronald Camp	Udo Kier			
Dr. Handley	David Margulies			
Martha Mertz	Judy Clayton			
Burton Quinn		Bob Gunton		
Wachati Princess		Sophie Okonedo		
Tiny Warrior Wachootoo Prince		Tommy Davidson		
Hitu		Adewalé		
Wachati Chief		Damon Standifer		
Rex Ventura			Ralph Waite	
Dr. Sickinger			Cullen Douglas	
Russell Hollander			Art LaFleur	

== Additional crew and production details ==
Film	Crew/Detail					
Film	Composer	Cinematographer	Editor	Production companies	Distributing companies	Running time
Ace Ventura: Pet Detective	Ira Newborn	Julio Macat	Don Zimmerman	Morgan Creek Entertainment	Warner Bros. Pictures	86 minutes
Ace Ventura: When Nature Calls	Robert Folk	Donald E. Thorin	Malcolm Campbell	Morgan Creek Entertainment, O Entertainment	Warner Bros. Pictures	94 minutes
Ace Ventura Jr.: Pet Detective	Laura Karpman	Mark Irwin	Danny Saphire	Four Aces Productions, Morgan Creek Entertainment	Cartoon Network, Warner Home Video	93 minutes

== Reception ==
=== Box office performance ===
Film	Box office gross			Box office ranking		Home video sales	Budget	Worldwide Net income	Ref.
Film	North America	Other territories	Worldwide	All time North America	All time worldwide	Home video sales	Budget	Worldwide Net income	Ref.
Ace Ventura: Pet Detective	$72,217,396	$35,000,000	$107,217,396	#1,127	#2,213	information not available	$12,000,000	$95,217,396	
Ace Ventura: When Nature Calls	$108,360,063	$104,039,937	$212,400,000	#651	#907	information not available	$30,000,000	$182,400,000	
Ace Ventura Jr.: Pet Detective	—N/a	—N/a	—N/a	—N/a	—N/a	$117,421	$7,500,000	$109,000,000	

=== Critical and public response ===
Film	Rotten Tomatoes	Metacritic	CinemaScore
Ace Ventura: Pet Detective	48% (60 reviews)	37/100 (14 reviews)	A−
Ace Ventura: When Nature Calls	31% (26 reviews)	45/100 (17 reviews)	B+
Ace Ventura: Pet Detective	—N/a	—N/a	—N/a
Ace Ventura Jr.: Pet Detective	—N/a	—N/a	—N/a

== Music ==
=== Soundtracks ===
- Ace Ventura: Pet Detective (Original Motion Picture Soundtrack)
- Ace Ventura: When Nature Calls (Original Motion Picture Soundtrack)
- Ace Ventura Jr.: Pet Detective (Original Motion Picture Soundtrack)

== Video games ==
Various licensed video games for various arcade and home console systems were released:

Ace Ventura: Pet Detective – a handheld LCD video game released in 1995, to coincide with the release of Ace Ventura: When Nature Calls.

Ace Ventura: When Nature Calls – a handheld LCD video game released in 1995, to coincide with the titular film.

Ace Ventura: The CD-Rom Game – developed by 7th Level, the game was released on PC CD-ROM in 1996. Based on the animated series Ace Ventura: Pet Detective, the gameplay was an example of the point-and-click adventure genre. The game was met with mixed reception, including a 6.6 out of 10 from GameSpot, while Gamezilla gave it 58 out of 100.

Ace Ventura: Pet Detective - The Case of the Serial Shaver – developed by Brilliant Digital Entertainment, the game was released on PC CD-ROM in 2000. The gameplay involved a choose your own adventure mechanic. Jack Feldstein was the writer/developer of this interactive story.
