= Michael Daingerfield =

Canadian actor

- Occupations: Actor, acting coach
- Years active: 1995–present
- Website: michaeldaingerfield.com

Michael Daingerfield is a Canadian actor, acting coach and the founder of On the Mic Training, a voice acting school in Vancouver, British Columbia.

He is best known for his voice roles of Ace Ventura in Ace Ventura: Pet Detective, playing Gordon Godfrey on the CW's superhero drama Smallville, and his English dub of the anime as Gintoki Sakata in Gintama.

== Early life and education ==
Daingerfield attended Murray State University in Kentucky on a tennis scholarship. He graduated with a degree in business and administration.

== Career ==
Michael Daingerfield's first voice acting job was playing Ace Ventura on the animated series of the same name. According to voice director Dan Hennessey, Daingerfield did a few of Jim Carrey's ADR lines in the second Ace Ventura film (Ace Ventura: When Nature Calls), when Carrey was unavailable to do them himself.

In 2006, Daingerfield wrote, produced and starred in "Daingerfield," a short feature loosely based on his life.

In 2007, Daingerfield founded On the Mic Training, a Vancouver-based voice acting school where he and many other Vancouver voice actors train students in voice-over.

In 2017, he was cast as lead character Gintoki Sakata in the Ocean dub of Gintama.

== Personal life ==
In 2007, Daingerfield ranked third in Canada for Men's Singles over 35 tennis.

== Filmography ==
=== Anime ===
List of dubbing performances and production work in anime television series.
Year	Title	Role	Crew Role, Notes
2002–2003	Transformers: Armada	Wheeljack, Highwire	
2004–2005	Transformers: Energon	Inferno / Roadblock	
2005	Transformers: Cybertron	Quickmix	
2008	Black Lagoon: The Second Barrage	Hanada, Police Officer	
2008	Mobile Suit Gundam 00	Johann Trinity	
2009	Nana	Koichi Satou	
2012–2013	Inuyasha: The Final Act	Sesshōmaru	Viz dub, replacing David Kaye before David Kaye returned in Yashahime: Princess Half-Demon
2017	Gintama°	Gintoki Sakata	Ocean dub

List of dubbing performances in anime films.
Year	Title	Role	Crew Role, Notes
2021	Gintama: The Final	Gintoki Sakata	Sentai dub

=== Animation ===
List of voice performances in animation
Year	Title	Role	Notes
1995–2000	Ace Ventura: Pet Detective	Ace Ventura	Credited as Michael Hall; did some ADR lines for Jim Carrey
1997	The Mask: Animated Series	Ace Ventura	Credited as Michael Hall; did some ADR lines for Jim Carrey
1998	Bad Dog	Professor Peerless	
1999	Mythic Warriors	Actaeon	
2000	Rescue Heroes	Steve	
2002–2003	Yakkity Yak	Keo's Dad	
2005	Krypto the Superdog	Superman	Episode: "Krypto's Scrypto"
2005–2006	Firehouse Tales	Additional Voices	
2006	Class of the Titans	Dionysus	Episode: "Little Box of Horrors"
2006–2008	Pucca	Chang	
2007	Sushi Pack	Satel-Lightning, Aqua-bot Boy	
2007	George of the Jungle	Narrator	
2009	Shelldon	Luthor	
2009–2010	Kid vs. Kat	Mr. Gerber	
2009–2012	Iron Man: Armored Adventures	Milos Masaryk / Unicorn	
2011–2019	My Little Pony: Friendship Is Magic	Braeburn, Antique Chicken Stand Pony, Ancient Beast Dealer, Townspony 4, Announcer, Tour Pony, Palace Guard 1, additional voices	4 episodes (Braeburn); 6 episodes (total)
2011–2012	Rated A for Awesome	Pale Cyan Twitchy	
2013	Packages from Planet X	Mr. Dooley	
2013	Max Steel	Axel	
2013–2014	Lego Star Wars: The Yoda Chronicles	Han Solo, Wedge	
2013–2014	Superbook	Isaac	
2014–2015	Leapfrog Letter Factory Adventures DVD Series	Quigley	
2014–2016	Nerds and Monsters	Vink, Little Beast, Petey Porthole, Baby Monster	
2015	Lego Star Wars: Droid Tales	Han Solo, Bossk, Stormtrooper #1	
2016–2017	Nexo Knights	Lance cosplayer, Jokes Knightly, Gargoyle	
2017	Chuck's Choice	Coach Dwayne	
2017–2019	Marvel Super Hero Adventures	Captain America, Tinkerer	
2017–2020	Ninjago	Krux/Dr. Saunders, Tony The Bartender	
2018–2020	The Hollow	Benjamini	
2018	Nina's World	Radio DJ	
2018	Dinotrux	Goldtrux	
2018	Polly Pocket	Mr. Moneyweather	
2018	The Dragon Prince	Ellis's Father	
2019	My Little Pony: Rainbow Roadtrip	Mr. Hoofington	TV special
2019	Gigantosaurus	Patchy	
2019	Super Monsters	Ranger Ben	
2020	Marvel Battleworld: Treachery at Twilight	Captain Americat	
2020	Lego Marvel Avengers: Climate Conundrum	Steve Rogers / Captain America	

=== Film ===
List of voice performances in film
Year	Title	Role	Notes
2006	The Barbie Diaries	Mr. Bennett, Stage Manager	Direct-to-video
2014	Barbie and the Secret Door	King of Zinnia	Direct-to-video
2015	Barbie & Her Sisters in the Great Puppy Adventure	Joe, GPS Voice	Direct-to-video
2016	Sausage Party	Indian Chutney, Chunk Munchers Cereal, Light Bulb	
2020	Cats & Dogs 3: Paws Unite!	Duke	Direct-to-video

=== Live-action ===
List of acting performances in film and television
Year	Title	Role	Notes
1997	The Third Twin	Young Guard	Television film
1998	Highlander: The Raven	Parkinson	Episode: "Crime & Punishment"
1999	The City	Jail Guard	Episodes: "Shadows" and "Surviving"
1999	Earth: Final Conflict	Sentry, Team Leader	Episodes: "The Vanished" and "Volunteers"
1999	Mr. Rock & Roll: The Alan Freed Story	Bill Haley	Television film
2000	Real Kids, Real Adventures	Paramedic	Episode: "Language of Life"
2001	The Outer Limits	Delivery Man	Episode: "Family Values"
2001	Wolf Lake	Dale	Episode: "Tastes Like Chicken"
2002	Special Unit 2	Federal Marshall	Episode: "The Love"
2002	Glory Days	The Real Mr. Jerrett	Episode: "There Goes the Neighborhood"
2002	Stargate SG-1	Big Jaffa	Episode: "The Other Guys"
2002	John Doe	Officer	Episode: "Bloodlines"
2002	The Black Prayer	Bud Kirkland	Short film
2002	Wake-Up Call	Joe	Short film
2003	Dreamcatcher	Conklin	
2003–2011	Smallville	Gordon Godfrey, Darkseid, Security Guard	Recurring
2004	Tru Calling	Justin's Partner	Episode: "Murder in the Morgue"
2004	Kingdom Hospital	Policeman	Episode: "Butterflies"
2004	Touching Evil	Donnie	Episode: "Boston"
2004	Catwoman	Forensics Cop	
2004	Dead Like Me	Conrad	Episode: "Send in the Clown"
2004	Da Vinci's Inquest	Carton	Episode: "That's Why They Call It A Conspiracy"
2004–2008	The L Word	Security Guard, Talk Show Host	Episodes: "Lookin' At You Kid" and "L'Ennui"
2005	Cold Squad	Friend	Episode: "Mr. Bad Example"
2005	What's Up With the Kids	Brian	Short film
2005	Amber Fray: Witness for the Prosecution	Jim Carter	Television film
2005	The Long Weekend	Cop #3	
2005	Stephen King's Dead Zone	Dr. Jenson (Age 40)	Episode: "Babble On"
2005	Supernatural	Dustin Burwash	Episode: "Bugs"
2006	Merlin's Apprentice	Pig (voice)	
2006	Flight 93	FBI Agent	Television film
2006	Eight Days To Live	Ted	Television film
2006	The Time Tunnel	German Corporal #1	Television film
2006	Daingerfield	Himself	Short film
2006	Dark Storm	Scientist # 1	Television film
2006	Saved	DHS Agent #1	Episode: "Living Dead"
2006	The 4400	Dr. Ellsworth	Episode: "Terrible Swift Sword"
2006	Firestorm: Last Stand at Yellowstone	Maya's Dad	Television film
2006	Masters of Horror	Jim	Episode: "Sounds Like"
2006	To Have and to Hold	George	Television film
2007	The Messengers	Police Officer	
2007	Post Mortem	Police Officer	Television film
2008	Making Mr. Right	George	Television film
2008	Amber Alert: Terror on the Highway	Sergeant Barrone	Television film
2010	Tooth Fairy	Hockey Announcer	
2010–2011	Hellcats	Emcee, Announcer	Episodes: "Papa, Oh Papa" and "I Say a Little Prayer"
2012	Virtual Lies	Dr. John Turner	Television film
2012	The Package	Anthony	
2013	The Haunting in Connecticut 2: Ghosts of Georgia	Reporter # 1	
2013	Psych	Dorian Creech	Episode: "Office Space"
2013–2014	Arrow	Ned Foster	Recurring
2014	The Killing	Senior Instructor	Episode: "Dream Baby Dream"
2023	With Love and a Major Organ	Radio Presenter	

=== Video games ===
List of voice performances in video games
Year	Title	Role	Notes
1996	Ace Ventura: The CD-Rom Game	Ace Ventura	
1999	The Misadventures of Tron Bonne	Glyde	English dub
2011	Dynasty Warriors: Gundam 3	Treize Khushrenada	English dub
2013	Dead Rising 3	Phoenix	

== Awards ==
=== Leo Awards ===
Year	Nominated work	Category	Result
2006	Daingerfield	Best Male Performance in a Short Drama	Nominated
2006	Daingerfield	Best Screenwriting in a Short Drama	Nominated
2011	Smallville	Best Guest Performance by a Male in a Dramatic Series	Nominated
