= Ace Ventura: The CD-Rom Game =

1996 video game

- Developer: 7th Level
- Publisher: Bomico Entertainment Software
- Engine: TopGun
- Platform: Windows
- Release: August 1996
- Genre: Point-and-click adventure

Ace Ventura: The CD-Rom Game is a 1996 adventure game released for the PC by 7th Level. The game is based on the animated series Ace Ventura: Pet Detective, itself an adaptation of the Ace Ventura feature films. Michael Hall, who voiced Ace in the animated series, also voices Ace in The CD-Rom Game.

Although 7th Level and Morgan Creek announced they would create "multiple interactive products" based on the animated series, The CD-Rom Game was the only title released.

== Gameplay ==
Ace Ventura is a 2D point-and-click graphic adventure game with occasional action sequences. The player controls Ace, who investigates a mystery of related animal kidnappings. The player explores a variety of locations across the globe to interact with characters, solve puzzles, and advance the story.

== Development ==
After the success of Ace Ventura: Pet Detective, the sequel When Nature Calls, and the Ace Ventura animated series, the production company Morgan Creek began searching for a developer to bring the franchise to video games. 7th Level was chosen as a company with experience in comedy software, such as Monty Python's Complete Waste of Time, as well as games with extensive animation, such as Battle Beast.

Jeff Steefel led production and design of the game. The game was developed with 7th Level's proprietary TopGun engine. Development began in January 1996 for a planned July release. This planned 6-month schedule was "astonishingly short" in comparison to an industry standard of 18 months.

== Reception ==
Reception

Review scores
Publication	Score
GameSpot	6.6/10 (fair)
Computer Games Strategy Plus	2.5/5
GameZilla	58/100

Ace Ventura received mixed reviews. Criticism focused on the game's simplistic puzzles and repetitive, overbearing comedy. Reviewers also noted "misbegotten" action sequences and an inability to skip lengthy cutscenes. However, the game's colorful and expressive animations were positively noted, and some reviewers enjoyed the game's sense of humor.
