= Ace Ventura: Pet Detective (TV series) =

Animated series, 1995–1997, 1999–2000

- Genre: Comedy
- Based on: Ace Ventura by Jack Bernstein
- Developed by: Duane Capizzi
- Directed by: Dave Pemberton
- Voices of: Michael Hall; Richard Binsley; Vince Corazza; Pam Hyatt; Bruce Tubbe; Al Waxman
- Theme music composer: Jim Curiale; Tim Torrance
- Countries of origin: United States; Canada
- Original language: English
- No. of seasons: 3
- No. of episodes: 41

Production
- Executive producers: James G. Robinson; Gary Barber; Toper Taylor; Patrick Loubert; Michael Hirsh
- Producer: Eleanor Kearney
- Running time: 22–24 minutes
- Production companies: Morgan Creek Productions; Funbag Animation Studios; Nelvana Limited (seasons 1–2); Odyssey Entertainment (season 3)

Original release
- Network: CBS
- Release: December 13, 1995 – August 30, 1997
- Network: Nickelodeon
- Release: October 29, 1999 – February 4, 2000

Related
- Ace Ventura: Pet Detective; Ace Ventura: When Nature Calls; Ace Ventura Jr.: Pet Detective

Ace Ventura: Pet Detective, or simply Ace Ventura, is an animated television series based on the 1994 film. The series was produced by Morgan Creek Productions, Funbag Animation Studios, (Note: As stated in the ending credits.) Nelvana Limited, for the first two seasons and Odyssey Entertainment in association with Hong Ying for the third and final season. It aired for two seasons from December 13, 1995 to August 30, 1997 on CBS. A third season and reruns of previous episodes aired on Nickelodeon from October 29, 1999 to February 4, 2000.

Ace Ventura: Pet Detective is one of three animated series based on three 1994 Jim Carrey films premiering in the same year; the others are the 1995–1997 The Mask: Animated Series, and the 1995–1996 Dumb and Dumber series.

== Overview ==
The series takes place after the Ace Ventura movies. The titular character, voiced by Canadian actor Michael Daingerfield (credited as Michael Hall), is a goofy private investigator with a predilection for animals of all species.

The series ran on CBS for two seasons, with a third season airing on Nickelodeon from 1999 until 2000 when the channel acquired the show to broadcast reruns. Some of the characters from the movie were retained, though not voiced by their original actors. Seth MacFarlane was among the writers over the course of the show's run.

The show was filled with gross-out humor and irony (one episode centered around the Egyptian Mau, claiming it to be an extinct breed of cat, when, in fact, they are not). The series ran in a time slot after The Mask (another popular Jim Carrey-based cartoon), and both series ended with a two-part crossover episode featuring the other series' characters. Both series eventually ran for three seasons, two on CBS and the third elsewhere.

A computer game, Ace Ventura, was based on the show and (to a lesser extent) the movies.

== Voice cast ==
- Michael Hall as Ace Ventura
- Richard Binsley as Spike
- Vince Corazza as Mr. Schickadance
- Pam Hyatt as Atrocia Odora
- Bruce Tubbe as Emilio
- Al Waxman as Aguado
- Harvey Atkin as Phatteus Lardus
- Rob Paulsen as Stanley Ipkiss / The Mask
- Ron Pardo as Roy

== Episodes ==
=== Series overview ===
Season	Episodes	Originally released	
Season	Episodes	First released	Last released
1	13	December 9, 1995	April 27, 1996
2	13	September 7, 1996	August 30, 1997
3	15	October 29, 1999	February 4, 2000

=== Season 1 (1995–96) ===
No. overall	No. in season	Title	Written by	Original release date
1	1	"The Reindeer Hunter"	Duane Capizzi	December 9, 1995
Ace is called on by Santa to find his reindeer, on Christmas Eve! When Ace discovers who it is, he has to save them before Christmas.
2	2	"Bowling for Bear"	Robert Schechter, Alisa Marie-Schudt	January 20, 1996
When a Grizzly's life is put in danger, the only person willing to save its life is Ace. Ace has to uncover who is doing this and put a stop to it.
3	3	"Pet Food"	Ernie Jon	January 27, 1996
When something is endangering the lives of many animals in Miami, Ace is called upon to investigate and uncover what's going on. The only thing they have in common is that they are the last of their kind.
4	4	"The Parrot Who Knew Too Much"	Steve Roberts	February 3, 1996
Ace has to save a Parrot who knows too much from falling into the wrong hands.
5	5	"French Dip"	Alexx Van Dyne	February 10, 1996
Ace is convinced that something fishy is going on when a normally placid blue whale tries to assassinate a nature show host.
6	6	"Natural Born Koalas"	Robert Schechter, Alisa Marie-Schudt	February 17, 1996
When a friendly koala goes aggressive, its up to Ace to find out why.
7	7	"The Hounds of D'Urbervilles"	Steve Roberts	February 24, 1996
Ace meets the Hounds of an elite British family known as the D'Urbervilles as each hound is taken one by one. He must find out the location of the hounds before the traditional fox hunt.
8	8	"Remembrance of Trunks Past"	Tara Ison	March 2, 1996
When the city of Miami is over-run by large elephants, Ace is called in by the city to investigate.
9	9	"Night of the Gorilla"	Steve Roberts	March 9, 1996
When a cute kind-hearted gorilla is accused of committing an awful crime, it is up to Ace to clear the name of the gorilla before it is too late.
10	10	"Day of the Groundhog"	Ernie Jon	March 30, 1996
Ace Ventura must help save the life of a Groundhog on Groundhog Day.
11	11	"The Big Stink"	Dean Stefan	April 6, 1996
Ace follows his nose when a little boy's pet skunk gets skunk-napped.
12	12	"The Gator Gal"	Steve Roberts	April 20, 1996
Ace Ventura meets the Gator Gal.
13	13	"The Bull Market"	Robert Schechter, Alisa Marie-Schudt	April 27, 1996
Ace investigates the problems of some bulls.

=== Season 2 (1996–97) ===
No. overall	No. in season	Title	Written by	Original release date
14	1	"Panda-monium"	Steve Roberts	September 7, 1996
Ace runs into some problems when he is asked to save some Pandas.
15	2	"Snow Job"	Steve Roberts	September 14, 1996
When a tribe's huskies disappear, Ace journeys to Siberia to help find them. However, things go from bad to worse when Ace's search gets him caught in the middle of a Russian arms smuggler's plan to steal a doomsday weapon from a secret military installation run by Russian armed forces who believe the Cold War is still in effect.
16	3	"Salmon Rush Hour"	Robert Schechter, Alisa Marie-Schudt	October 5, 1996
Ace must find out what happened to the salmon.
17	4	"The Search for Spike"	Seth MacFarlane	October 19, 1996
When a smuggler monkey-naps Spike by mistake, Ace travels all over Miami to find his partner.
18	5	"The Milky Way"	Steve Roberts	November 2, 1996
When cows have been taken by what appears to be aliens, Ace discovers that Claw is up to no good again.
19	6	"The Golden Kitten"	Robert Schechter, Alisa Marie-Schudt	November 16, 1996
When Ace discovers the last of a breed of cats that have been said to be extinct for centuries, he discovers a legend of a gold statue... and a terrible curse.
20	7	"Thunderballrighty Then"	Steve Roberts	November 23, 1996
Ace must protect a dog from the most dangerous criminal mastermind in the world.
21	8	"Dragon Guy"	Steve Roberts	December 7, 1996
Ace tells a story about a man who finds and later saves a dragon from an evil sorcerer.
22	9	"Bad Hare Day"	Seth MacFarlane	December 14, 1996
In New York City, The Amazing Blackstein hires Ace Ventura to Locate Bernie, his rabbit, but a jealous rival of Blackstein and an old adversary of Ventura are involved.
23	10	"Robo West"	Steve Roberts	December 21, 1996
A parody of the movie Westworld where Ace tracks down horse smugglers.
24	11	"Howl of the Weremoose"	Steve Roberts	January 18, 1997
When Ace deals with a new case, it is discovered that there may be a weremoose involved.
25	12	"Bald Courage"	Ralph Soll	February 8, 1997
When all the bald eagles in America are stolen, Ace discovers a conspiracy that will change America forever if not stopped.
26	13	"Have Mask, Will Travel"	Duane Capizzi	August 30, 1997
Ace is called upon by NASA to travel to a space station where a hamster—one that knows the entire Elvis Presley catalogue—is missing. When Stanley Ipkiss arrives to retrieve his mask, which was stolen by Spike, he becomes the Mask and joins Ace on his mission. Note: This is the second part of a crossover with The Mask: Animated Series, following the events of The Mask episode "The Aceman Cometh".

=== Season 3 (1999–00) ===
No. overall	No. in season	Title	Written by	Original release date
27	1	"Witch's Brew"	Jan Strnad	October 29, 1999
Ace has to find a missing pet bat at a high school.
28	2	"Bird is the Word"	Seth MacFarlane	November 30, 1999
Ace has been called to find a missing falcon before midnight.
29	3	"Dino Mite"	Tom Mason, Dan Danko	December 1, 1999
In this Jurassic Park parody, Ace has been called to find some missing resurrected dinosaurs.
30	4	"Ace in Space"	Bill Matheny	December 2, 1999
In this Star Wars parody, Ace is hired by aliens from another planet.
31	5	"Get Piggy"	Scott M. Gimple	December 3, 1999
Ace has to find Gabe, a movie star pig who can talk.
32	6	"Ace Off"	Steve Marmel	December 6, 1999
When all clues point to Ace for a dog-napping, he must not only find the dog but also clear his name.
33	7	"Shell Shock"	Butch Hartman	December 7, 1999
Ace has been called to find a rock band's pet turtle.
34	8	"Beware the Fly"	Tom Mason, Dan Danko	December 8, 1999
A parody of The Fly. Ace swaps heads with Spike.
35	9	"Ace in Time"	Seth MacFarlane	December 9, 1999
Ace goes back in time to rescue a panther cub from a smuggler-turned-emperor.
36	10	"When Nature Shrieks"	Bill Matheny	December 10, 1999
Ace is hired to track down a mysterious creature known as the Wooly Howl. It's actually called Putt Detective and involves Ace saving a gopher at a golf course.
37	11	"Exor-Kitty"	Batton Lash	January 7, 2000
Ace is called in to exorcise a cat.
38	12	"Ace of the Jungle"	Tom Mason, Dan Danko	January 14, 2000
Ace gets stranded on a tropical island.
39	13	"Cyber Ace"	Bill Matheny	January 21, 2000
Ace gets trapped in cyber space.
40	14	"Circus Ace"	Bill Matheny	January 28, 2000
Ace has to solve a mystery in a circus.
41	15	"The Cat Who Paints"	Tom Mason, Dan Danko	February 4, 2000
Ace has to find a cat that can paint.

== Crossover ==
A two-part crossover between Ace Ventura: Pet Detective and The Mask, another animated series based on a Jim Carrey film, aired on August 30, 1997. The crossover begins with The Mask episode "The Aceman Cometh", and concludes with the Ace Ventura episode "Have Mask, Will Travel". At the time of the original airing, Ace Ventura: Pet Detective was running in the adjoining time slot immediately following The Mask in CBS's Saturday morning lineup. During the crossover, Stanley/Mask and Ace retain their respective animation styles while appearing within the other's show. The crossover also serves as the second-season finale of Ace Ventura and the series finale of The Mask.

In "The Aceman Cometh", Stanley Ipkiss's dog Milo has his brain switched with that of a scientist and is then dog-napped. Stanley in turn hires Ace to help get him back. At the end of the episode, Spike steals the mask, and Stanley follows them to Miami to retrieve it. In "Have Mask, Will Travel", Stanley catches up to Ace just as he is recruited to solve a case on a space station, leading Stanley to become the Mask and join the investigation.

== Home media ==
A three-episode DVD of the show was bundled with the two Ace Ventura movies. The back of the package has a mistake in the description of the pilot episode "The Reindeer Hunter", stating that Santa's main reindeer, Rudolph, has been abducted when in truth, Rudolph is not in the episode at all, rather it was the rest of his reindeer that had been abducted. This was also the only DVD release of this show. The show's rights are now with Revolution Studios (who acquired the Morgan Creek Entertainment library in 2014), with distribution handled by Sony Pictures Television.
