= Ace Ventura Jr.: Pet Detective =

2009 film by David Mickey Evans

- Official DVD cover
- Based on: Characters by Jack Bernstein
- Screenplay by: Jeffrey Sank; Jason Heimberg; Justin Heimberg; David Mickey Evans
- Story by: Jeffrey Sank; Jason Heimberg; Justin Heimberg
- Directed by: David Mickey Evans
- Starring: Josh Flitter; Emma Lockhart; Ann Cusack; Cullen Douglas; Art LaFleur; Austin Rogers; Reed Alexander; Ralph Waite
- Music by: Laura Karpman
- Country of origin: United States
- Original language: English

Production
- Producers: James G. Robinson; David Robinson
- Cinematography: Mark Irwin
- Editor: Danny Saphire
- Running time: 93 minutes
- Production companies: Warner Premiere (Note: Warner Bros. Pictures' logo appears in the film.); Morgan Creek Productions; Four Aces Productions

Original release
- Network: Cartoon Network
- Release: March 1, 2009

Related
- Ace Ventura: When Nature Calls (1995)

Ace Ventura Jr.: Pet Detective (also known as Ace Ventura 3: Pet Detective Jr.) is a 2009 American made-for-television adventure comedy film is a standalone sequel to Ace Ventura: Pet Detective and Ace Ventura: When Nature Calls, without involvement from either lead actor Jim Carrey or writer Steve Oedekerk. The third installment in the Ace Ventura franchise, it began production in Orlando, Florida on September 17, 2007, and was directed by David Mickey Evans and written by Jeff Sank, Jason Heimberg, and Justin Heimberg.

== Plot ==
Ace Ventura Jr. is the son of eccentric 'pet detective' Ace Ventura, who had disappeared when he was a baby, and is attempting to follow in his footsteps, much to the chagrin of his mother, Melissa, who repeatedly tries to dissuade him from doing so after saving a mouse. Currently, he is attempting to uncover who is behind a series of pet thefts occurring at his school, including a rare emerald green koi fish belonging to a girl named Laura, whom Ace Jr. has a crush on. Ace Jr. regularly relies on science nerd A-Plus (who has an advanced lab in his locker) to provide the forensics work for him and, much like his father, his work is openly mocked by the student body.

When Ting Tang, a baby panda that has recently arrived at the Miami Zoo, is stolen, Melissa, who was in charge of setting up a pen for it and its mother, is blamed for the theft and subsequently arrested. As both of her parents are out of town for a vacation on a cruise ship, Melissa reluctantly invites Ace Jr.'s paternal grandfather, Rex Ventura, to look after him, and he immediately begins properly training his grandson in the family business so he can clear his mother's name. At the trial, Ace Jr. successfully proves that the footprints found in Ting Tang's pen could not have been made by Melissa, but Russell Hollander, a park ranger seeking fame from the case, has the evidence dismissed and she's ultimately sentenced.

Despite Melissa finally accepting that her son is who he is and revealing what happened to his father (Ace had disappeared over the Bermuda Triangle while escorting several geese south and is presumed dead), a despondent Ace Jr. decides to abandon pet detection and be a normal kid like she wanted, but a pep talk from Rex restores his confidence. Resolving to find Ting Tang's real kidnapper, Ace Jr. (now sporting his father's style and mannerisms), A-Plus, and Laura discover that Ting Tang was actually the latest target in a string of thefts involving high-profile animals: Princess the lapdog, Freedom the hawk and Calypso the "Magic Horse". After being unable to prevent Tabby the tabby cat from being taken from an autograph session at Animal Actors on Location at Universal Orlando, the group confronts Dr. Michael Sickinger, whom they saw at the meet and greet Tabby was at and has a website called PandaFanatic. However, he is ultimately proven innocent as the website is full of pictures of disgusting and unattractive animals like the aye-aye, the proboscis monkey, the Chinese paddlefish, and the marabou stork.

Continuing to dig around, the group (now including Sickinger) discover that there has been unusual activity at the home of Quentin Pennington Sr., whose son Quentin Jr. is set to hold an extravagant birthday party there soon. Arriving as Laura's plus one, Ace Jr. finds evidence that Quentin Sr. has stolen the animals under the belief that he deserved them more than anyone else. When Hollander refuses to acknowledge the evidence, Ace Jr., with a distraction from A-Plus and Sickinger, uses a recording of Ting Tang's mother to locate the panda cub and the other animals, allowing the authorities to arrest Quentin Sr. and forcing Hollander to leave in disgrace. When Quentin Jr. strangely leaves the area, Ace Jr., after an offhanded comment from Laura, and the rest of the student body present discovered that he was responsible for the school pet thefts, having discovered his father's illicit activities and wanting to make him proud. When he attempts to feed Laura's koi fish to the school alligator called Mr. Chompers, Quentin Jr. is stopped by Ace Jr. and Rex's dog named Sparky (whom Ace Jr. had assumed was dead) and is arrested as well. Melissa is released from jail, Ting Tang is reunited with his mother, and Ace Jr. is rewarded for his heroics.

== Cast ==
- Josh Flitter as Ace Irwin Ventura Jr., the son of Ace Ventura
- Emma Lockhart as Laura Wilson
- Ann Cusack as Melissa Robinson Ventura, the wife of Ace Ventura and the mother of Ace Ventura Jr. She was previously played by Courteney Cox in the first film.
- Cullen Douglas as Dr. Michael Sickinger
- Art LaFleur as Russell Hollander
- Austin Rogers as Arnold Plushinsky/A-Plus
- Reed Alexander as Quentin Pennington Jr.
- Ralph Waite as Rex Ventura, the father of Ace Ventura and the paternal grandfather of Ace Ventura Jr.
- William Haze as Magician
- Jesse Kozel as Neighbor
- Brian Patrick Clarke as Quentin Pennington Sr.
- Aubrey Peeples as Daniella
- Ashley Milchman as Emo Kid #1
- Brooke Milchman as Emo Kid #2

== Reception ==
=== Critical response ===
The film was panned critically. Film Threat gave the film 1½ stars out of 5, stating "It's disappointing that this is the next, and most likely final step of the Ace Ventura franchise." Common Sense Media gave it 2 out of 5 stars, summing the film up as a "Funny, animal-loving kid lost in crude script." Movie Metropolis also gave a negative review, stating "What was pretty juvenile in the first place becomes literally juvenile in this straightforward kids' romp. If I were a kid, I might like it. But I'm not a kid, and I didn't."

== Possible sequel ==
Initially thought to be the final film in the Ace Ventura franchise due to its poor performance, it was rumored in February 2021 that a new sequel was being developed with Evan Peters being cast as the "son of Ace Ventura". By March 2021, it was officially announced that a direct sequel to the first two films is in development at Amazon Studios, with Pat Casey and Josh Miller, the writers of Sonic the Hedgehog, in which Jim Carrey also starred, serving as writers for the film.
