= Ann Cusack =

American actress

- Born: May 22, 1961 (age 65); New York City, U.S.
- Education: Berklee College of Music
- Occupation: Actress
- Years active: 1992–present
- Spouse: Jim Piddock (m. 2023)
- Father: Dick Cusack
- Relatives: Joan Cusack (sister); John Cusack (brother)

External image
- Cusack at an event for Gothika in 2003

Ann Cusack (/ˈkjuːsæk/ KEW-sak; born May 22, 1961) is an American actress. She had roles in Multiplicity (1996), A League of Their Own (1992), and The Informant! (2009). Additionally, she has made guest appearances in a number of television series, including Grey's Anatomy, Scandal, One Tree Hill, Charmed, Ghost Whisperer, The Unit, Boston Legal, Bones, Frasier, Ally McBeal, Star Trek: Enterprise, Criminal Minds, Private Practice, Fargo, Better Call Saul, The Boys, and The Good Doctor.

== Early life ==
Cusack was born in New York City and was raised in Evanston, Illinois. She has four siblings, including Joan and John. Her mother, Ann Paula "Nancy" (née Carolan), was a mathematics teacher and political activist. Her father, Dick Cusack, was an actor, producer, and writer. With her sister Joan and brother John, she trained at the Piven Theatre Workshop in Evanston, and graduated from the Berklee College of Music in Boston, Massachusetts, in 1987.

== Career ==
=== Acting ===
Cusack starred in her first film role in 1992, when she was cast in A League of Their Own, as Shirley Baker. She was in the 1996 comedy Multiplicity, which starred Michael Keaton and Andie MacDowell. Also in 1996, she replaced Anita Barone on The Jeff Foxworthy Show until the series ended. In 1998, Cusack starred in Maggie on Lifetime Television.

Cusack has made guest appearances in Grey's Anatomy, Scandal, One Tree Hill, Charmed, Ghost Whisperer, The Unit, Boston Legal, Bones, Frasier, Ally McBeal, Criminal Minds, Private Practice, and Castle among others. In 2002, she guest-starred in the episode of Star Trek: Enterprise entitled "Carbon Creek". She had a small role in Grosse Pointe Blank, which starred her siblings John and Joan; appeared in the movie Accepted, in which she plays Diane Gaines, mother to the lead character played by Justin Long; and appeared in the film What Planet Are You From?. She also co-starred in Ace Ventura Jr: Pet Detective as Melissa Robinson Ventura, the titular character's mother (replacing Courteney Cox from the original film).

She also appeared in the SciFi series Lost Room as Helen Ruber (two episodes, 2006). In 2015, she appeared in the first episode of Fargo's second season. In 2016, she played Donna Dent in the Clint Eastwood-directed Warner Bros. film Sully, about Chesley Sullenberger and the events of Flight 1549, starring Tom Hanks. She also made her first appearance as Rebecca Bois, Chuck's ex wife, in season two of Better Call Saul, later returning in season three.

== Filmography ==
=== Film ===
Year	Title	Role	Notes
1992	A League of Their Own	Shirley Baker	
1993	Malice	Waitress	
1994	Renaissance Man	Bill's Secretary	
1995	Tank Girl	Sub Girl	
1995	The Point of Betrayal		
1996	The Birdcage	TV Woman in Van	
1996	Multiplicity	Noreen	
1996	My Fellow Americans	White House Tour Guide	
1997	Grosse Pointe Blank	Amy	
1997	Cannes Man	Kitty Monaco	
1997	Peoria Babylon	Candy Dineen	
1997	Midnight in the Garden of Good and Evil	Delivery Woman	
1999	Stigmata	Dr. Reston	
2000	What Planet Are You From?	Liz	
2001	America's Sweethearts	Assistant to Lee Phillips	
2006	Accepted	Diane Gaines	
2006	The Sensation of Sight	Deanna	
2006	Arc	Angela Blake	
2007	Cake: A Wedding Story	Celeste	
2007	The Neighbor	Jenny	
2009	The Informant!	Robin Mann	
2009	The First Time	Beatrice	
2010	Crooked Lane	Ava	
2014	Nightcrawler	Linda	
2016	Sully	Donna Dent	
2017	Heart, Baby	Nurse Claire	

=== Television ===
Year	Title	Role	Notes
1992	Overexposed	Marcy Levin	TV film
1992	The Jackie Thomas Show	Stephanie	TV series
1993	Love & War	Katherine	Episodes: "Valentine's Day" & "Croton on Hudson"
1993	Victim of Love: The Shannon Mohr Story		Television film
1995	Murder, She Wrote	Margaret Barkley	Episode: "The Scent of Murder"
1996–1997	The Jeff Foxworthy Show	Karen Foxworthy	Main role
1998	From the Earth to the Moon	Jan Armstrong	TV miniseries
1998–1999	Maggie	Maggie Day	Lead role
1999	Ladies Man	Delilah	Episode: "Thanks for Nothing"
2000	The Huntress	Melissa Schiffer	Episode: "Kidnapped"
2001	Ally McBeal	Rebecca Moore	Episode: "The Obstacle Course"
2001	What About Joan?	Ann Gallagher	Episode: "Joan's Sister Visits"
2001	Black River	Mandy Pruell	TV film
2002	My Sister's Keeper	Grace	TV film
2002	Family Law	Nancy Emerson	Episode: "Alienation of Affection"
2002	Star Trek: Enterprise	Maggie	Episode: "Carbon Creek"
2003	Miracles	Karen Longview	Episode: "The Friendly Skies"
2003	Frasier	Antonia	Episode: "Daphne Does Dinner"
2003	The Brotherhood of Poland, New Hampshire	Julie Shaw	Main role
2004	One Tree Hill	Dr. Nora Thorpe	Episodes: "The Living Years" & "Hanging by a Moment"
2004, 2005	Charmed	Miss Donovan	Episodes: "Charmed Noir" & "Carpe Demon"
2005	Six Feet Under	Linda Hoviak	Episode: "Dancing for Me"
2006	Ghost Whisperer	Grace Dowling	Episode: "Melinda's First Ghost"
2006	Grey's Anatomy	Amy	Episode: "What Have I Done to Deserve This?"
2006	Fatal Contact: Bird Flu in America	Denise Connelly	Television film
2006	Bones	Brianna's Lawyer	Episode: "The Titan on the Track"
2006	Close to Home	Martha Harris	Episode: "There's Something About Martha"
2006	The Lost Room	Helen Ruber	TV miniseries
2007	Boston Legal	Dr. Donna Follette	Episode: "Angel of Death"
2007	Army Wives	Hannah White	Episode: "Dirty Laundry"
2008	Brothers & Sisters	Jamie	Episode: "Double Negative"
2008	Greek	Karen Cartwright	Episode: "47 Hours and 11 Minutes"
2008–2009	The Unit	Susan Gillium	Recurring role
2009	Ace Ventura Jr.: Pet Detective	Melissa Ventura	Television film
2009–2011	Private Practice	Susan Grant	Recurring role
2010	Criminal Minds	Sarah Hillridge	Episode: "Mosley Lane"
2010	Trauma		Episode: "Scope of Practice"
2010	In Plain Sight	Melissa Donaldson	Episode: "Whistle Stop"
2010	The Genesis Files	Jane	3 episodes
2011	Harry's Law	Lynette Zales	Episode: "The Fragile Beast"
2012	Body of Proof	Gail Whirley	Episode: "Identity"
2012	Hart of Dixie	Annie Hattenbarger	Episodes: "The Race & the Relationship" & "Disaster Drills & Departures"
2012	Scandal	Corinne Stark	Episode: "Hunting Season"
2013	Masters of Sex	Harriet	Episode: "Brave New World"
2014	Sullivan & Son	Ellen	Episode: "Everybody Loved Frank"
2015	Backstrom	Sandy Hale-Cooper	Episode: "Love is a Rose and You Better Not Pick It"
2015	Fargo	Judge Mundt	Episode: "Waiting for Dutch"
2015, 2016	Castle	Rita	Episodes: "XX" & "Dead Red"
2016	Grimm	Mrs. Baske	Episode: "Lycanthropia"
2016–2018	Better Call Saul	Rebecca Bois	5 episodes
2017	Tycoon	Catherine Blake	TV series
2017	Mr. Mercedes	Olivia Trelawney	3 episodes
2018	Castle Rock	Warden Theresa Porter	5 episodes
2019–2026	The Boys	Donna January	Recurring role
2020	Station 19	Joan	Episode: "I Know This Bar"
2021	The Good Doctor	Ilana Reeves	Episode: "Expired"
2024	Ripley	Emily Greenleaf	Episode: "A Hard Man to Find"

== Personal life ==
Cusack married actor Jim Piddock on April 1, 2023 in a private ceremony in their home in Los Angeles, California. Cusack is the stepmother to Piddock's daughter from his previous marriage.
