= Jack Feldstein =

- Born: Adelaide, South Australia
- Education: National Institute of Dramatic Art; Australian Film, Television and Radio School
- Occupations: Animator, screenwriter

Jack Feldstein is an Australian animator and screenwriter based in New York.

Feldstein uses a style called "neonizing": a combination of live-action video recording and public domain material, including cartoons that utilizes software to render the lines of an image to be like a neon sign.

== Early life and education ==
Feldstein was born in Adelaide, Australia to Mark and Victoria (née Freyer) Feldstein, French-speaking Ashkenazi Jews who were born in Egypt and emigrated to Adelaide, Australia.

Feldstein studied in Sydney, where he studied at the National Institute of Dramatic Art (NIDA) course in playwriting and graduated from the Australian Film, Television and Radio School (AFTRS) in scriptwriting in 1992. He also obtained a degree in pharmacy from the University of Sydney.

== Career ==
Feldstein was a scriptwriter before making neon films. In the 1990s, he worked for Australian television. He then went on to be Head Writer for Brilliant Digital Entertainment, where he was involved in creating animated multipath webisode series that included Xena-Warrior Princess, Superman, and Ace Ventura.

=== Neon animation ===
Feldstein describes neon animation (neonism) as a deconstructionist, post-modern animation filmmaking style that utilizes appropriation and pop art techniques. It is a stream-of-consciousness narrative with a cartoon aesthetic that takes modernist stream-of-consciousness filmmaking into a post-modern and humorous form.

Neon animation has also been described as re-animation and as metempsychotic (reincarnated) modernism. The rambling, seemingly make-it-up-as-you-go-along, stream of consciousness ironic monologue narratives have been likened to an Australian twist on Woody Allen and Spalding Gray.

=== Narratives ===
Recently, Feldstein completed a six-part series called "The Adventures of..." He has also released two narrative documentary neon animations: The Fantastical World of Scriptwriting and The Psychology of Scriptwriting.

As a participant and supporter of the Kino movement in Sydney, Australia, Feldstein used to screen his neon animations at their monthly events.

=== Current work ===
Currently, Feldstein is the Director of Outreach and Filmmaker Liaison for Chain Theatre on W36th St., and AMT Theater on W45th St. in Manhattan. Presently at AMT Theater, he is developing his play The Descent to Dali to be mounted in 2026.

In July 2021, he was the recipient of a City Artist Corps Grant from the City of New York for his Animated New Yorkers series, in which Feldstein interviews and then animates 10 New York artists.

In December 2021, The Queensland Museum of Modern Art's cinematheque included Feldstein's 2005 neon animation The Great Oz Love Yarn in their retrospective of Australian animators and animations from the 1970s onwards.

In 2022, Feldstein completed a neon animation adaptation of "Isaac B. Singer Shows and Tells" which currently streams on ChaiFlicks. Feldstein has also completed versions of HP Lovecraft's tales "Ex Oblivione" and "Memory". He is planning to create a third neon animation in his scriptwriting trilogy, which will be called "Confessions of a Scriptwriter". In collaboration with New York-based actor Shane Baker, he developed the neon animation " How to Break into Yiddish Vaudeville". "How to Break into Yiddish Vaudeville" had its world premiere in January 2015 in the Walter Reade Theater at Lincoln Center as part of the 2015 New York Jewish Film Festival. Feldstein also created a neon animation with Baker, who recited Peretz Markish's Yiddish poem Brokshtiker (Shards) for the 60-year commemoration of the Night of the Murdered Poets in August 2012. This premiered at the New York Jewish Film Festival 2013, Walter Reade theater at the Lincoln Center, on 10 January 2013.

In June 2015, Feldstein completed a neon animation called "Plain Talk", collaborating with Deborah Starr, a graduate of the Narrative Medicine department at Columbia University.

"You Might be the One" a song by Botanica, the New York-based band, is Feldstein's most recent music video neon animation.

He also completed neon animations to various New York spoken-word poets including one of Walt Whitman's poems "Manahatta" performed by poet, George Wallace, the writer in residence at the Walt Whitman Birthplace, Huntington, New York. The "Manahatta" neon animation screened at the Angelika Film Center in New York City for two weeks and its European premiere was at the Zebra Poetry Film Festival in Berlin in October 2012. As part of Curate NYC 2013, an open artworks competition that received over 1900 submissions from New York-based artists, "Manahatta" was selected by Jan Seidler Ramirez, Chief Curator & Director of Collections, National September 11 Memorial & Museum in Lower Manhattan. It was on display at the newly refurbished Queens Museum of Art as part of the Arts Commons. "Manahatta" screened at the New York Transit Museum in Brooklyn in April 2014 as part of their Platform Series. Jack was series coordinator for The Subway Poetry Film series featuring six films by New York filmmakers interpreting six poems on the subject of the New York City Subway. Feldstein's neon animation contribution is to the poem "Subway Services" by Philip Dacey. The Subway Film Series premiered at the Queens World Film Festival, New York on 4 March 2012, and amongst many other venues and colleges around New York City. The Subway Film Series screened at the Queens Museum of Art for their "A Frame Apart 2" program.

During 2011, Feldstein was the art/film editor for "Unlikely Stories" an online US literary publication for poetry, film, art and essays.

For New York Fashion Week 2011, Feldstein co-directed with top New York designer, Norma Kamali, the 3D Fashion Film presenting the Norma Kamali Spring Collection 2012. The film was premiered at Lincoln Center, 14 September 2011. Included in the 3D film is Feldstein's first foray in 3D neon animation. It was nominated for "Best Online Fashion Video" at the 2012 New York Fashion Awards 2.0. Jack continues to work with Kamali on 3D Fashion films and various other projects. For New York Fashion Week Fall/Winter 2012, Feldstein helped Kamali create two 3D fashion films launching her collections.

Love and Sex Between Prime Numbers, a feature film script by Feldstein is currently being developed by Spotted Turquoise Films.

As part of the Dream Up Festival August 2013 at the downtown Theater for the New City, Feldstein's monologue about a young woman on a bender, "The Bender" is part of the Grand Guignol Danse Macabre series of plays. In October 2013, "The Bender" was also performed around New York City including at the Bronx Museum of the Arts.

A production of Jack's play with songs by Melanie Safka, "Three Months with Pook," was mounted at Dixon Place in Lower Manhattan in July 2014. "Three Months with Pook" was again invited to be performed at Dixon Place in February 2015. "Three Months with Pook" was a winner in the TRU, (Theater Producers Organization based in New York) play competition in summer 2019. The play with songs, based on his neon animation of the same name, deals with issues of sexual fluidity and abuse in a humorous way.

Feldstein was a member of Workshop Theater Company at 312 West 36th Street in Manhattan and developed some of his scripts and musicals there.

In Fall 2018, Jack Feldstein began a residency at Sitting Shotgun Theatre in Williamsburg, Brooklyn where with Annemarie Hagenaars he developed his next project Carnival of Souls: Neon Animation plus Live Theatre which launched at Dixon Place in NYC on 12 October 2018. With this project, Feldstein combined his two loves, neon animation and live theater. In 2019, this work was selected to be mounted at the New York Fringe Festival in the Chain Theatre, midtown Manhattan.

In November 2019, Feldstein's play The Sparkling City of Omar Mazen was selected by the Blank Theatre Company in Los Angeles, for their Living Room Series.

"The Guru of Ozone Park," Feldstein's play about a New York couple facing the challenges that occur after the husband suffers a spinal cord injury that renders him unable to walk, was selected for Healing Voices at Kean University, Premiere Stages Theatre, New Jersey in February 2021.

Feldstein has written the book and lyrics for the world's first theremin musical "Falling in Love with Dellamort" working with Dorit Chrysler, founder of the NY Theremin Society and composer Paul Doust. "Falling in Love with Mr Dellamort" had its World Premiere on 6 December 2017 at The Slipper Room in NYC. "Falling in Love with Mr. Dellamort" the audio musical was released July 23, 2021. This radio adaptation was written by Feldstein. Broadway performers James Monroe Iglehart, Courtney Reed, Lena Hall, Jackie Hoffman, Telly Leung, Gavin Lee were cast. The soundtrack was released by Broadway Records. In August 2025, Falling in Love with Mr Dellamort was mounted at the Edinburgh Fringe Festival. The Scotsman newspaper called it an Edinburgh Fringe cult hit.

Feldstein has created an animated series called Animated New Yorkers. One of these animations, Animated New Yorkers: Joel, about a young religious Jewish man's first physical encounter with the opposite sex, screened January 28th at Lincoln Center, New York, during the New York Jewish Film Festival 2026.

A retrospective of The Animated films of Jack Feldstein was held on April 15, 2026 at the National Arts Club on Gramercy Park in Manhattan.

In October 2026, Jack Feldstein won the prize for best animation at the 3rd AMT International Film Festival in NYC for his Animated New Yorkers: Jennifer Jiles animation about an ex-Rockette.

== Reception and honors ==
Feldstein's short films have been shown at film festivals around the world. Some of these festivals and honors for his films and plays include:

- The Secret of the Birds, Feldstein's animation about the meaning of life according to a philosophical parrot, was selected for the 36th Girona (Spain), Lift Off (UK) and ONED Arts (China and France/Toulouse) Film Festivals in 2024.
- In Pursuit of Happiness, honorable mention in the Broadway On Demand Short Film Festival, August 2021
- The Women's Follow Your Dream Club, Best Ten Minute Plays of 2019" book published by Smith and Kraus.
- Excellence Award for Feldstein's one-act play THE CONFESSION OF PETER McDOWELL from Shakespeare in the Burg Theater Festival, Virginia in 2018.
- Neil Simon's Last Hit, finalist in the 2017 Aloha Performing Arts Company original play contest. It has also been chosen as a Stage Rights Ready-to-Publish Award Finalist 2019. And a finalist of the Pegasus Theater Circle of Laughter in Dallas, Texas in 2026.
- Excellence Award for Feldstein's one-act play THE PROCESS in June 2016 from Shakespeare in the Burg Theater Festival, Virginia.
- Providence Children's Film Festival 2015, Feldstein's neon animation "Monocular Man" won runner up in both the Audience Award and the Special Jury's Choice Award for best short film. "Monocular Man" also won the Jury Prize for Animation at the New England Online Film Festival which was presented at the ITVFest (Independent Television Festival) in Vermont 2015..
- In 2009, Feldstein's full-length play "The Sparkling City of Omar Mazen" received a "commended" by that year's BBC World Service International Playwriting Competition.
- Melbourne International Animation Film Festival, where in 2006 he received an Honorable Mention for "The Ecstasy of Gary Green."
- In 2007, "A Wondrous Film about Emma Brooks" was again a finalist for the Dendy Awards, Sydney Film Festival.
- The Bunker International Film Festival 2007 (Italy/The Netherlands) where " A Wondrous Film about Emma Brooks" won an audience favourite prize.
- Wollongong, Short-Sited Festival where in 2005 he received the Best Short Film prize (Australian National Short Film) for "The Great Oz Love Yarn." In October 2007, "The Great Oz Love Yarn" was awarded a prize in the under 12-minute films category, at the inaugural Hawkesbury Film Festival, New South Wales, Australia.
- Over The Fence Comedy Festival, where in 2005 his film "Rock Hard" won the Best Film prize. In 2007 "The Great Oz Love Yarn" won Best Director Prize in that festival.
- The Australian Effects & Animation Festival 2002, where his film "Three Months with Pook" was awarded a Certificate of Excellence.
- As a scriptwriter, in 2000, Feldstein won first prize of $5000 in the Queensland Speech and Drama Teachers' Jubilee National Playwriting Competition for his play "A House Like Any Other."

== Selected filmography ==
- The Ecstasy of Gary Green
- Computer Games
- The Loser Who Won
- Rock Hard
- A Wondrous Film about Emma Brooks
- The Great OZ Love Yarn
- The Adventures of James Joyce
