= Emma Lockhart =

American actress

- Occupations: Actress (former); Television reporter (current)
- Years active: 2003–2011 (acting); 2016–present (reporting)

Emma Lockhart is an American journalist and former child actor, best known for her roles as a young Rachel Dawes in Batman Begins, and Laura in Ace Ventura Jr.: Pet Detective.

She has since transitioned to broadcast journalism as an adult, and currently works in Phoenix, Arizona as a reporter for the "Arizona's Family" duopoly of KTVK/KPHO-TV (channels 3/5) owned by Meredith Corporation.

== Acting career ==
She had numerous small roles in television, movies, and the stage.

Lockhart also appeared in The Seeker, as Gwen Stanton.

She was the young Rachel Dawes in Batman Begins (2005).

She was the female lead in Ace Ventura Jr: Pet Detective, which was released in March 2009, direct to video.

== Reporting career ==
Lockhart then attended Arizona State University, majoring in communications as a student at the school's Walter Cronkite School of Journalism and Mass Communication, which produces newscasts for sister operation KAET (channel 8), where she reported, and also anchored the Monday evening edition of the school's Cronkite News broadcast. After graduation, she then worked for two years as a multimedia journalist and weather presenter for KERO-TV (channel 23) in Bakersfield, California, before she took her current position as a reporter with KTVK/KPHO.

== Filmography ==
=== Film ===
Year	Title	Role	Notes
2005	Batman Begins	Young Rachel Dawes	
2005	Looking for Comedy in the Muslim World	Laura	
2006	Canvas	Tiffeny	
2007	The Seeker: The Dark Is Rising	Gwen Stanton	
2009	Ace Ventura Jr: Pet Detective	Laura	Television film

=== Television ===
Year	Title	Role	Notes
2003	Eve's Dropping In	Renee	
2004	Malcolm in the Middle	Girl Scout	TV episode: "Reese Comes Home"
2005	Special Ed	Meghan	aka Saving Lives (Australia: Pay-TV title)
2011	True Jackson, VP	Callie	TV episode: "True Mall"
