= Cullen Douglas =

American actor (born 1967)

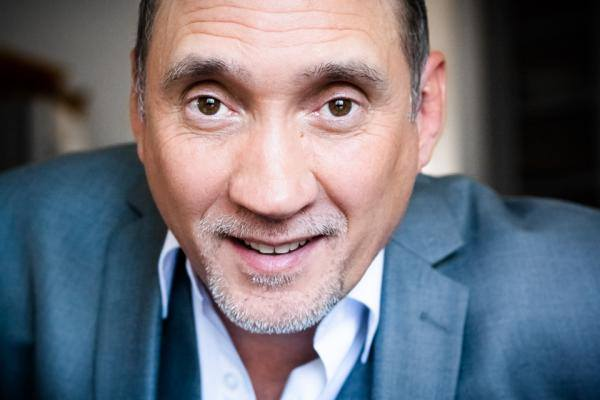
- Douglas in January 2015
- Born: California, U.S.
- Education: American Musical and Dramatic Academy (1988); Florida School of the Arts
- Occupations: Actor; playwright; screenwriter
- Years active: 1994–present
- Spouse: Rachel Douglas (m. 1994)
- Children: 2
- Website: www.cullendouglas.com

Cullen Douglas is an American actor, playwright, and screenwriter. His most notable television appearances have come from recurring roles on Pure Genius, Private Practice, Prison Break, Grey's Anatomy, Scandal, and Agents of S.H.I.E.L.D.. His film credits include The Dog Lover (2015), Ace Ventura, Jr.: Pet Detective (2009), Shuttle (2008), Sunshine State (2002) and Love Liza (2002). He had a long, successful stage career before becoming a screen actor.

== Early life ==
His parents are Dick and Diane Baumbach. His father was an investigative reporter. Douglas attended Cocoa Beach High School, the American Musical and Dramatic Academy (1986) and the Florida School of the Arts. He returned to FSOTA in 2010 to give their commencement address. He also completed an acting internship with New Stage Theatre in Jackson, Mississippi.

== Acting career ==
Douglas is best known for his television guest appearances on shows such as Prison Break, Private Practice, and Grey's Anatomy. His roles have included The Bird Man on ABC's Grey's Anatomy and Sapo on FOX's Prison Break. His other television credits include The Mentalist (2011), CSI: NY (2010), Psych (2010), True Blood (2009), Without a Trace (2008), Criminal Minds (2007), Bones (2006), CSI: Crime Scene Investigation (2006), Charmed (2005) and Six Feet Under (2005).

Douglas's film appearances include Ace Ventura, Jr.: Pet Detective (2009), Shuttle (2008), Sunshine State (2002) and Love Liza (2002).

Douglas has also performed in television commercials for products such as T-Mobile, Kellogg, and FedEx. He is represented by the firm Greene and Associates.

== Writing and stage career ==
Douglas previously worked as a writer for both Disney and Nickelodeon and was a contributing editor to Ability magazine. He was the first recipient of The Humanitas Organization's "New Voices" initiative, which paired Cullen alongside Shonda Rhimes. He also wrote and continues to perform across the country in the solo play Afraid to Look Down, which explores his journey in becoming a first-time father to son born with Down syndrome.

He wrote the screenplay for Building Bridges as well as co-writing the film Letters to God. For the stage Cullen wrote and stars in the acclaimed and award-winning solo play Afraid to Look Down, which explores the journey he took in becoming a first-time father to a son born with Down syndrome.

Douglas received the "Lillie Stoates", a regional theater award, for Best Supporting Actor in a Play, for his work in The Orlando Theatre Project's "The Lion in Winter".

== Filmography ==
=== Film ===
Year	Title	Role	Notes
2024	The Bunker	Dr. Finley Barlowe	
2019	The Black String	Man in Black	
2015	The Dog Lover	Vincent	
2015	The Adventures of Beatle	Patient	
2014	The Possession of Michael King	Mortician	
2009	Deadland	Nathaniel	
2009	Ace Ventura, Jr.: Pet Detective	Dr. Sickinger	TV movie
2008	Shuttle	Andy	
2006	After Midnight: Life Behind Bars	Larry Burns	TV movie
2003	Small Town Conspiracy	Hotel Clerk	
2002	Sunshine State	Jefferson Cash	
2002	Big Trouble	Fly by Air Captain Justin Hobart	
2002	Love Liza	Cashier at Pancake House	
2000	The Crew	Young Man	
1998	Making Waves	Mr. Perkins	
1995	The Limits of Thermal Traveling	Dennis Hayes	

=== Television ===
Year	Title	Role	Notes
2018	The Assassination of Gianni Versace: American Crime Story	FBI Agent Reynolds	Episode: "Alone"
2017	Twin Peaks	Disc Jockey	Episode: "Part 8"
2016	Pure Genius	Louis Keating	8 Episodes
2015	Castle	Noah Lewis	Episode: "Holander's Woods"
2014	Criminal Minds	Dr. Wilson	Episode: "The Itch"
2014	Major Crimes	Minister/Preacher	Episode: "Jane Does #38"
2014	Caper	The Landlord	2 Episodes
2013–2014	Agents of S.H.I.E.L.D.	Edison Po	3 Episodes
2013	Kickin' It	Farmer Jebediah Pratchett	Episode: "Witless Protection"
2012–2013	Scandal	Steve Doherty	3 Episodes
2007–2013	Grey's Anatomy	Dr. Bob Richardson/Mr. Arnold	2 Episodes
2012	Dark Wall	Dr. Diendes	Episode: "Home: A Ghost Story"
2011	The Mentalist	Vince Candide	Episode: "Pink Tops"
2010	CSI: NY	Gerald Gordon	Episode: "Uncertainty Rules"
2010	Psych	Dr. Tony Mallon	Episode: "Death is in the Air"
2010	The Forgotten	208	Episode: "Double Doe"
2009	True Blood	Mitch Merlotte	Episode: "Beyond Here Lies Nothin'"
2008	Private Practice	Hal Jarvis	Episode: "Tempting Faith"
2008	Without a Trace	Gerald Back	Episode: "Satellites"
2008	Shark	Peter Mirsky	Episode: "Bar Fight"
2008	The Riches	Ulysses Gillard	Episode: "Trust Never Sleeps"
2007	Prison Break	Sapo	Episode: "Orientacion"
2007	Criminal Minds	Dr. Wilson	Episode: "The Big Game"
2006	Passions	Shady Guy	Episode: "#1.1860"
2006	Deadwood	Committee man/Bank Customer	2 Episodes
2006	Bones	Harry Tepper M.E.	Episode: "The Man with the Bone"
2006	The Shield	Dr. Lesser	Episode: "Trophy"
2006	CSI: Crime Scene Investigation	Manager	Episode: "Killer"
2005	Charmed	Imp Master	Episode: "Rewitched"
2005	Strong Medicine	Lab Tech Tom Abrams	2 Episodes
2005	Wanted	Nelson	Episode: "Badlands"
2005	Six Feet Under	Mr. Clarington	Episode: "The Rainbow of Her Reasons"
2005	Alias	Jimmy	Episode: "The Road Home"
2004–2005	Scrubs	Patrick/Two O'clock Man	2 Episodes
2004	Las Vegas	Schmee	Episode: "Degas Away with It"
2004	ER	Marvin	Episode: "Try Carter"
2003	Boomtown	Arnold Rabjohn	Episode: "Home Invasion"
2003	Star Trek: Enterprise	Suliban Soldier	Episode: "Future Tense"
2001	Going to California	Tom Fish	Episode: "Hurricane Al: A Tale of Key Largo"
2001	Walker, Texas Ranger	Johnny	Episode: "Reel Rangers"
2000	Sheena	Lazier	Episode: "Sheena (Pilot)"
2000	Grapevine	Desk Clerk	Episode: "Thumper"
2000	The Steve Harvey Show	Arthur	Episode: "The Honeymooners"
1999	RollerJam	Hans	
1998	Mortal Kombat: Conquest	Bola Guy	Episode: "Undying Dream"
1997	Kenan & Kel	Nervous Robber	Episode: "Ditch Day Afternoon"
1996	Big Bag	Bernard the Crossing Guard	
1994	All That	Mr. Bulbus	Episode: "Trashin' Fashion"

== Personal life ==
Douglas met his wife Rachel in Jackson, Mississippi while performing in the musical Eden. They married in 1994 and have two sons, Gabriel and Cameron. Gabriel was born with Down syndrome and was diagnosed at age fifteen with Leukemia. They live in Los Angeles, California.
