= The Mask: Animated Series =

- Genre: Superhero; Comedy; Slapstick
- Based on: The Mask by: John Arcudi; Chris Warner; Doug Mahnke
- Developed by: Duane Capizzi
- Directed by: Russell Calabrese; Juli Murphy; Ginny McSwain (voice director)
- Starring: Rob Paulsen as the voice of Stanley Ipkiss; Tim Curry as the voice of Pretorius
- Voices of: Jim Cummings; Tress MacNeille; Kevin Michael Richardson; Neil Ross; Heidi Shannon; Ben Stein; Mark L. Taylor; Frank Welker
- Theme music composer: Keith Baxter; Christopher Neal Nelson
- Composer: Christopher Neal Nelson
- Country of origin: United States
- Original language: English
- No. of seasons: 3
- No. of episodes: 54

Production
- Executive producers: Joe Bacall; Tom Griffin; C.J. Kettler; Bob Friedman; Mike Richardson; Phil Roman
- Producer: Gary Hartle
- Production companies: Film Roman; Dark Horse Entertainment; Sunbow Entertainment; New Line Television; (Note: Animation outsourced to Cuckoos' Nest Studio, Daewon Media, Philippine Animation Studio, Plus One Animation, and Wang Film Productions.)

Original release
- Network: CBS; Syndication
- Release: August 12, 1995 – August 30, 1997

Related
- The Mask; Son of the Mask; Adventures of the Mask; Ace Ventura: Pet Detective

The Mask: Animated Series is an American superhero animated television series based on the Dark Horse comic book series and its film adaptation. The series aired for a total of three seasons and fifty-four episodes from August 12, 1995, to August 30, 1997. It spawned its own short-run comic book series, Adventures of The Mask. John Arcudi, former writer of the original comics, wrote two episodes of the series. The Mask was one of three animated series based on Jim Carrey films that premiered the same year. These included the 1995–2000 Ace Ventura: Pet Detective series, and the 1995–1996 Dumb and Dumber series.

== Synopsis ==
The Mask: Animated Series focuses on the adventures of insecure bank clerk Stanley Ipkiss, who is often belittled or humiliated by others, while thrust into situations he sometimes hates to be caught in. To cope with life, he frequently uses an ancient mask that transform the wearer into a superpowered being based on the wearer's personality and mindset. In Stanley's case, his alter ego, referred to as The Mask, is a mischief maker who loves to party, but will save the day when something he loves is threatened or if a villain gets on his bad side, and uses powers that operate per "cartoon" law — a result of Stanley's love for cartoons. Often Stanley tends to find his alter ego a handful to cope with, especially when forming relationships with women, and often tries to abstain from using the mask but finds it often is needed when the situation requires the intervention of the Mask. The pair are often helped by Stanley's two closest friends: his dog Milo, who sometimes wears the mask either intentionally or by accident; and reporter Peggy Brandt, who is aware of his secret, and often gets in trouble when investigating a possible criminal act being committed.

Most episodes consist of a plot in which the Mask needs to defeat a villain causing havoc, while in some episodes Stanley finds himself having to recover the mask either because he loses it or someone else wears it, becoming superpowered but with a personality that is unstable. While the series is an adaptation of the 1994 film, the writers changed events pertaining to Stanley's acquisition of the mask, including writing out certain characters from the film, and establishing that Peggy was not killed (as per the original edit of the film).

== Characters ==
=== Main characters ===
- Stanley Ipkiss/The Mask (voiced by Rob Paulsen) – A shy and insecure bank clerk who found himself in possession of the mask of Loki, which turns him into a wisecracking, fun-loving, mischievous green-faced entity with superpowers that allow him to cartoonishly alter reality at will. Stanley and The Mask each have a distinct personality, such as Stanley being shy and meek, while the Mask is loud and confident, and refer to the other as a separate person, and display a brotherly rivalry. Stanley is conflicted about the mask and on several occasions tries to dispose of it but is forced to use the mask to get out of trouble, eventually coming to rely on it to fight supernatural enemies. During the late 1990s, Rob Paulsen discussed his role and the payment he got on the American TV talk show Donny & Marie, remarking that he got "to be Jim Carrey for a whole lot less cake."
- Milo (vocal effects provided by Frank Welker) – Stanley's dog (a Jack Russell Terrier) and loyal sidekick. He is also a frequent wearer of the mask, and is shown to be quite intelligent, able to understand some of the human language.
- Lt. Mitch Kellaway (voiced by Neil Ross) – A grumpy and arrogant detective lieutenant of the Edge City Police Department who is overzealous in blaming The Mask for every big crime and disaster, and linking The Mask to other criminals and villains. For this attention, Kellaway is a frequent victim of atomic wedgies from The Mask.
- Detective Doyle (voiced by Jim Cummings) – Lieutenant Kellaway's dimwitted and lazy partner who is somewhat friendly to the Mask and thinks of him more of a hero than a villain.
- Peggy Brandt (voiced by Heidi Shannon) – A tabloid reporter who mends her friendship with Stanley by rescuing him several times after having sold him out to the mob. Her career ambitions often put her in compromising situations from which The Mask rescues her. She is resourceful in outwitting certain rogues, and shows a motherly affection for The Mask.
- Charlie Schumacher (voiced by Mark L. Taylor) – The manager of the bank where Stanley works. He is Stanley’s best friend. He usually looks out for himself, pursues women, and takes advantage of Stanley as his friend. Although he promises to help Stanley's career, he is unhappy when Stanley finds success.

=== Recurring characters ===
- Dr. Arthur Neuman (voiced by Ben Stein) – Stanley's therapist and the only character to be voiced by the same actor from the film. He believes that "The Mask" is the suppressed side of Stanley who wants to be outrageous and impulsive. In one episode he wears the mask and becomes a psychotic, delusional, cartoonish and polite supervillain who believes a disorder called Ipkissia Maskosis is the cause of people believing the Mask is real and teamed up with Pretorius to archive it.
- Mayor Mortimer Tilton (voiced by Kevin Michael Richardson) – The corrupt mayor of Edge City. Despite his selfishness, Tilton is a person of genuine gratitude and often thanks The Mask for saving the city and frees him from any legal trouble that he causes. This is opposite of the film version of Tilton, who is more straightforward and compassionate of ending corruption.
  - Smedley (voiced by Cam Clarke) – Tilton's nerdy assistant.
- Agnes Peenman (voiced by Tress MacNeille) – Stanley's cranky landlady who tends to be the victim of The Mask's shenanigans when he emerges.

=== Antagonists ===
- Septimus Pretorius (voiced by Tim Curry) – The primary antagonist of the series. He is a mad scientist who had his own head removed from his body and placed on spider-like robotic legs, which can attach to a larger android body. His plans revolve around either obtaining or controlling the mask, or increasingly insane and deadly scientific experiments. Pretorius is one of the few characters in the series aware of The Mask's true identity.
  - Walter – Pretorius's mute, indestructible goon. A Frankenstein-like hulk who can't be hurt by The Mask, Walter is the only character from the original Dark Horse comics to appear in the animated series but not in any of the live-action films.
  - Pretorius's Henchmen (various voices) – The henchmen of Pretorius are shown to wear black and purple outfits. They are often seen carrying out criminal errands to prepare for his criminal plots.
- Lonnie the Shark (voiced by Glenn Shadix) – A biker gang leader who has sharp teeth and a hairdo that resembles a shark's fin.
  - Pete (voiced by Charlie Adler) – Lonnie the Shark's lazy sidekick, who makes an excuse of "feeling pain" on any part of his body to ditch the gang's dirty work for his fat companions.
  - Biff, Muffy, and Brad – The three tough members of Lonnie the Shark's biker gang.
- Arthur "Art" Nouveau (voiced by Jim Cummings) – An art forger who threatened to blow up a dynamite factory until Ipkiss talked him down.
- The Terrible Two – Dak (voiced by Cam Clarke) and Eddie (voiced by Jeff Bennett) are two slow-witted, comic-book obsessed teenage boys who exposed themselves to radiation with the intention of becoming superheroes. Dak was transformed into "Putty Thing", a humanoid creature made of clay who can shapeshift and possesses superhuman strength. Eddie became "Fish Guy", a talking fish who has no powers and cannot swim or breathe underwater.
- Skillit (voiced by Jason Marsden in season one, Benny Grant in season two) – A mischievous imp who hails from the Shadowland, and can suck the shadows from people, which preserves his youth while aging his victims. He is over 4,000 years old and has known everyone who possessed the mask.
- Kablamus (voiced by Jim Cummings) – Joe Blow is a green-haired man who had a chemical accident while experimenting on an unbreakable balloon, and gained the power to blow himself up like a balloon and explode without dying.
- Willamina Bubask (voiced by Conchata Ferrell) – A female criminal whose known crimes were dognapping, grand theft auto, and assaulting a police precinct. While Stanley was competing in a chili cook-off, Milo stumbled upon her dog-napping activities, to have dogs taste-test each recipe for Cheap Chucky. She has an unrequited love for Walter, who she met in prison.
  - Cheap Chucky – A crime partner of Willamina Bubask, who was defeated by Milo and later arrested by the police.
- Don Julovit (voiced by Cam Clarke in a Spanish accent) – The greatest bandit from Lispan. He arrived in Edge City for a crime in which every villain dressed as Santa Claus.
- Dynamite Joe (voiced by Jeff Bennett) – An explosives expert who disguises himself as Santa Claus for a crime spree.
- Chet Bozzack (voiced by Dan Castellaneta) – Stanley's reformed high school bully whose dark urges are reawakened when he accidentally wears half of the broken mask.
- Dr. Amelia Chronos (voiced by Victoria Carroll) – A mad scientist who builds time-manipulation devices that cause chaos as she seeks world dominance.
- Colonel Beauregard Klaxon (voiced by Jim Cummings) – A southern businessman who dumps nuclear waste under the city stadium, resulting in a swamp monster abducting the city's sports team. The Mask defeated the swamp monster and gave a wedgie to Klaxon who was arrested by Lt. Kellaway.
  - Billy Bob – Klaxon's henchman.
- Cookie Baboom (voiced by Cree Summer) – An exotic dancer and Mayor Tilton's former lover. She threatens to kill herself and assassinate Tilton during the Mayor's Bavariaville Day announcement.
- Channel Surfer (voiced by Gary Owens) – A madman with a gliding surfboard who teleports through televisions and can manipulate electricity and television content.
- Gorgonzola the Cheese Witch (voiced by Cree Summer) – An ancient villainess who was freed when her amulet was uncovered from a Mesopotamian tomb. Her powers include the Cheese-Eye (an eye laser that turns anything into cheese) and the Shot-Cheddar (an extra-sharp cheddar cheese arrow fired from Gorgonzola's palm). Gorgonzola was the winner of a contest held by Disney Adventures to create a new villain for the series.
- Sly Eastenegger (voiced by Neil Ross) – An action star who tries to take revenge upon his critics by detonating a nuclear bomb during the filming of his movie. The Mask thwarted his revenge and Eastenegger was arrested by Lt. Kellaway.
  - Director (voiced by Carlos Alazraqui) – An unnamed film director who resembles Steven Spielberg and helps Sly in his plot.
- Phony Frenchman (voiced by Jess Harnell) – A patriotic French terrorist with a bad French accent.
- The Devil (voiced by Jonathan Harris) – First appearing as "Bub", he signs a contract to make Stanley a winner without using the mask, but then tries to take him and The Mask to Hell as payment. The Mask is able to save them by defeating the Devil in a dance competition.
- The Tempest (voiced by Bud Cort) – Alter ego of Fritz Drizzle, a former weatherman who was struck by lightning and gained weather-control abilities.
- The Hood (voiced by Jess Harnell) – A criminal wanted for loan sharking, smuggling, jewel heists, and other crimes. As Lawrence Lorenzo, he was hired to be the police chief, but kidnaps the mayor in an attempt to take over Edge City.
- The Stinger (voiced by Stuart Pankin) – Buzz Stingman is a beekeeper who was turned into a bee-human hybrid creature after being severely stung by genetically-altered bees. He had the ability to control the behavior of bees and hypnotized the entire city into building a giant beehive. He was eventually stopped by the Mask who removed his stinger and returned him to normal.
- Madame Suspiria (voiced by Candi Milo) – A carnival gypsy who believes her family's magic created the mask. She gives Stanley a love potion which is accidentally used on Mrs. Peenman and causes several men to fall in love with her. Suspiria siphons some of the mask's powers to gain revenge on Admiral Wombat, but The Mask tricks her into attacking him with magic which returns his powers and falls victim to her own love potion.
- Sir Andrew Bedwetter (voiced by Jeff Bennett) – A Broadway director who adapts Mad Monkey, and is upstaged by The Mask, then tries to finance his next production through bank robberies.
- Government Guy (voiced by Frank Welker in normal form, Kevin Michael Richardson in Mask form) – The tyrannical future ruler of Edge City. At some point after a thermonuclear crisis, he found the mask and used it to power the city, while banning fun. Stanley time-travels to the future and uses his greater understanding of the mask to defeat him.
- Celia N. Airtight – A former researcher at Wrapmaster and founder of Putterware, whose products turn leftovers into monsters.
  - Harold – Airtight's right-hand man.
- Tex Clobber – A hunter/bounty hunter who is hired by Pretorius alongside Baxter Simon to capture The Mask. He uses normal hunting weapons.
- Baxter Simon – A businessman/bounty hunter who is hired by Pretorius alongside Tex Clobber to capture The Mask. He uses high tech gadgets.
- Selina Swint (voiced by Susan Silo) – A smuggler who brought counterfeit money to Edge City, but accidentally switches bags with Stanley.
- Vicky Pratt/Davida Steelmine (voiced by Cree Summer) – A magician-turned-thief and a former schoolmate of Stanley, who had a crush on her.
- Cybermite (voiced by Jim Cummings) – A living computer virus who resembles a termite. It grows bigger by eating brain cells.
- The Dark Star Trio – A trio of villains who emerge from the first issue of Doyle's favorite comic book The Galactic Avenger. They mistake Kellaway for their fictional archenemy and try to kill him, before they are defeated by The Mask. Its members are:
  - War Machine (voiced by Jim Cummings) – A robot armed with deadly weapons.
  - Dragon Lady (voiced by Kath Soucie) – She can transform into a dragon, fly, and breathe fire.
  - Riptide (voiced by Frank Welker) – A punk-like villain with the ability to transform into water.

=== Other characters ===
- Francis Forthwright (voiced by Mary McDonald-Lewis) – One of Stanley's neighbors who sometimes wants Stanley to babysit her baby boy during random moments.
- Baby Forthwright (vocal effects provided by Frank Welker) – Francis Forthwright's baby, who wears the mask on three occasions.
- Bank President (voiced by Jim Cummings) – The unnamed boss of Stanley and Charlie whose face is off-screen. He has a son in the film whom is the actual manager of the Edge City bank.
- Ace Ventura (voiced by Michael Daingerfield) – A Miami-based private pet detective specializing in the retrieval of missing animals who helps Stanley find Milo.
- Evelyn (voiced by Kath Soucie) – A petite, shy woman who accidentally puts on the Mask and becomes a tall woman named Eve who is loud and confident and in love with Stanley.

== Episodes ==
=== Series overview ===
Season	Episodes	Originally released		
Season	Episodes	First released	Last released	Network
1	15	August 12, 1995	November 11, 1995	CBS
2	30	September 7, 1996	March 29, 1997	Syndication
3	9	July 5, 1997	August 30, 1997	CBS

=== Season 1 (1995) ===
No. overall	No. in season	Title	Written by	Original release date
1–2	1–2	"The Mask Is Always Greener on the Other Side (Parts 1 & 2)"	Duane Capizzi	August 12, 1995
After causing him nothing but trouble, Stanley Ipkiss gets rid of his mask by burying it in quick-drying cement, but must retrieve it to save Peggy and Milo from Pretorius. Pretorius tricks Stanley's friend and co-worker, Charlie, into building a "house of tomorrow". The Mask must stop him and save Peggy, Charlie and Milo.
3	3	"Baby's Wild Ride"	Dean Stefan	August 19, 1995
Baby-sitting turns difficult when the infant acquires the Mask and joins a biker gang, whose leader is posing as children's entertainer Barnaby the Dinosaur.
4	4	"The Terrible Twos"	Ernie Jon	August 26, 1995
Lt. Kellaway handcuffs himself to Stanley to prove that he is The Mask, and Stanley must go to elaborate lengths to get away when mutants Putty Thing and Fish Guy go on a rampage.
5	5	"Sister Mask"	Henry Gilroy	September 2, 1995
Pretorius creates a "sister mask" that turns The Mask into a living puppet, in order to use him to steal meteorite fragments with unusual properties.
6	6	"Shadow of a Skillit"	Ernie Jon	September 9, 1995
The vitality-stealing Skillit comes to Edge City to steal the shadows of Charlie, Peggy, and Milo, and only The Mask can stop him.
7	7	"Bride of Pretorius"	Steve Roberts	September 16, 1995
Stanley dates a shy, quiet co-worker named Evelyn, who becomes a loud, man-hungry woman when she stumbles upon the mask. Meanwhile, Pretorious looks for a female companion.
8	8	"Double Reverse"	Henry Gilroy	September 23, 1995
A reverse therapy treatment helps Stanley deprive the mask of its power by acting uninhibited in his normal life, but must get the mask working again when the villain Kablamus threatens the city.
9	9	"Shrink Rap"	Steve Roberts	September 30, 1995
Stanley gives the mask to Dr. Neuman, who puts it on and teams up with Pretorius, who wants to nuke the city in order to take a flash photograph of an alien race's planet.
10	10	"Mayor Mask"	Dean Stefan	October 7, 1995
Frustrated by the city's mismanagement, Stanley puts on the mask hoping to teach Mayor Tilton a lesson. Instead, The Mask announces his candidacy for Mayor of Edge City. Initially objecting, Stanley has to make sure his alter ego wins when he discovers that Pretorius has taken Tilton's place for a diabolical plan.
11	11	"Martian Mask"	Steve Roberts	October 14, 1995
Mistakenly believing The Mask is an alien seeking to take over the planet, FBI agents try to capture him. Meanwhile, Putty Thing and Fish Guy go on a road trip.
12	12	"How Much Is That Dog in the Tin Can?"	John Arcudi	October 21, 1995
Milo puts on The Mask to battle an insane dogcatcher named Willamina Bubask who is capturing dogs for a (somewhat) sinister purpose. Meanwhile, Walter stalks Stanley at Cheap Chucky's Chili Cook-Off.
13	13	"All Hallow's Eve"	Henry Gilroy	October 28, 1995
On Halloween night, Skillit escapes from reform school to get revenge on The Mask, and reanimates the corpses of three of Stanley's predecessors: Atilla the Hun, Billy the Kid and an evil wizard called Nilrem.
14	14	"Santa Mask"	Dean Stefan	November 4, 1995
The villains in Edge City (namely Kablamus, Walter, the Terrible Two, Don Julovit, and Dynamite Joe) disguise themselves as Santa Claus to commit crimes. The Mask must save Christmas by proving Santa's innocence even after a brief detour thwarting Pretorius' plans to capture Santa.
15	15	"Split Personality"	Alexx Van Dyne	November 11, 1995
The mask breaks in half during Walter's attempt to steal it, resulting in both Stanley and The Mask existing at the same time. When former bully Chet Bozzack (voiced by Dan Castellaneta) gets the other half, the two personalities must work together to piece the mask together.

=== Season 2 (1996–97) ===
No. overall	No. in season	Title	Written by	Original release date
16	1	"A Comedy of Eras"	Marty Isenberg and Robert N. Skir	September 7, 1996
The Mask battles a mad female scientist named Dr. Amelia Chronos who sends Stanley to the era of the Salem Witch Trials where Stanley's only hope is to somehow locate the mask where he will have originally found it.
17	2	"Goin' for the Green"	Brooks Wachtel	September 14, 1996
After being humiliated by The Mask during an unveiling of his latest statue, Mayor Tilton seeks to reset the news cycle by recruiting Colonel Klaxon to create the Edge City Games. However, Klaxon stores nuclear waste underneath the city stadium which results in the creation of a swamp monster.
18	3	"Flight as a Feather"	Julia Lewald	September 21, 1996
Hours before a Swedish karaoke contest at the Coco Bongo, The Mask loses his lucky fedora feather and races to recover it – while trying to avoid Kellaway and Doyle, Mayor Tilton's vengeful ex-girlfriend, a performance artist, Walter, and a mother bald eagle.
19	4	"The Good, the Bad and the Fish Guy"	Mark Seidenberg	September 28, 1996
When Fish Guy acquires the mask, Stanley must convince Putty Thing to work with him before the city is destroyed.
20	5	"Malled"	Thomas Hart	October 5, 1996
When Lonnie the Shark and his gang rob a bank at the new mega-mall, Milo must bring the Mask to Stanley who is caught in the crossfire.
21	6	"Channel Surfin"	Sib Ventress	October 12, 1996
The Mask shifts through various television channels after being trapped inside a TV by Channel Surfer, who plots to brainwash the town into watching his favorite cult TV show just off the air, Pointy Peaks.
22	7	"Mask au Gratin"	Steve Cuden	October 19, 1996
Stanley is hired to show Mrs. Peenman's archaeologist niece, Jennifer, around Edge City. Jennifer had unearthed an ancient amulet which curses her by the moonlight to turn into an evil cheese goddess named Gorgonzola, who turns anything and everything into cheese.
23	8	"Jurassic Mask"	John Ludin	October 26, 1996
A nuclear-powered laser regenerator invented by Dr. Horace T. Proctor brings three animatronic dinosaurs to life. It is up to The Mask to stop the three dinosaurs before they wreck Edge City.
24	9	"You Oughta Be in Pictures"	Brooks Wachtel	November 2, 1996
Sly Eastenegger, a famous action movie star, and his director choose Edge City to film his latest movie, and challenge The Mask over who will be the next action star. Meanwhile, Peggy discovers a stolen nuclear bomb that Eastenegger is plotting to use in the film.
25	10	"For All Mask-Kind"	Adam Gilad	November 9, 1996
Stanley is chosen to be the first average man to be sent into space with paranoid astronaut Gil Headstrong; The Mask comes along for the ride.
26	11	"Up the Creek"	Ralph Soll	November 16, 1996
The Mask steals The Eiffel Tower following his encounter with the Phony Frenchman and Mrs. Peenman uses the apartment as a tourist attraction. Charlie invites Stanley to a river-rafting trip where the two become unwilling grooms to hillbilly and elderly brides.
27	12	"Boogie with the Man"	Richard Stanley	November 23, 1996
Stanley wishes he was as lucky as The Mask, and meets The Devil (disguised as a man named Bub), who gives Stanley his lucky break in exchange for his soul.
28	13	"What Goes Around Comes Around"	Mel Gilden	November 30, 1996
Dr. Amelia Chronos returns and puts Stanley (and The Mask) in a time loop in which they are doomed to repeat the same half-hour.
29	14	"All Hail the Mask"	Stephen Levi	December 7, 1996
During a trip to a Pacific island, The Mask encounters a tribe who worship him as a god, and who plot to sacrifice him.
30	15	"Power of Suggestion"	Sib Ventress and Tracy Berna	December 14, 1996
Stanley is hypnotized during Edge City's Fluff Ball, but Kablamus interrupts before the hypnotist reverses the spell. Kablamus then uses Stanley (and The Mask) to get back at Mayor Tilton for not choosing him as the grand marshal of the Fluff Parade.
31	16	"Mr. Mask Goes to Washington"	Thomas Hart	December 21, 1996
After saving the US President from being crushed by falling debris, The Mask becomes a presidential bodyguard, though a staff member doesn't trust him.
32	17	"Rain of Terror"	John Benke, Rob Humphrey, Jim Peterson	December 28, 1996
Disrespected weatherman Fritz Drizzle becomes a supervillain named The Tempest, whose attacks upon the city interrupt The Mask's night out.
33	18	"The Mother of All Hoods"	Marty Isenberg and Robert N. Skir	January 4, 1997
The Mask humiliates Kellaway on a police reality TV show, leading him to prove himself by going on a stakeout where he uncovers a plot by Hood to have the mayor kidnapped.
34	19	"To Bee or Not to Bee"	Steve Cuden	January 11, 1997
Disgraced beekeeper Buzz Stingman becomes human–bee mutant The Stinger, whose appetite for honey prompts him to brainwash the populace into manufacturing honey for him.
35	20	"Love Potion No. 8 ½"	Steven Melching and David McDermott	January 18, 1997
Stanley buys a love potion from Madam Suspiria, but accidentally spills it on his landlady, Mrs. Peenman, resulting in himself, The Mask, and several others becoming attracted to her.
36	21	"Cool Hand Mask"	Richard Stanley	January 25, 1997
The Mask is framed for stealing from a charity and is sent to prison. Pretorius then initiates his plan to take over Edge City through its electrical devices.
37	22	"Broadway Malady"	Ralph Soll	February 1, 1997
Broadway director Sir Andrew Bedwetter creates a musical based on Mad Monkey which brings an end to the action movie franchise, enraging The Mask who crashes opening night. Bedwetter snaps and creates a new musical featuring The Mask's past enemies (Channel Surfer, the Terrible Two, Walter, Kablamus, and Phoney Frenchman) and an animatronic monkey as the all-star cast.
38	23	"Enquiring Masks Want to Know"	Mel Gilden	February 8, 1997
Stanley takes the place of Peggy's photographer who quits following The Mask's fight with the Terrible Two. Peggy then sees a career-boosting story when Skillit unleashes his cryptoid toys: his version of Bigfoot and the Loch Ness Monster.
39	24	"Future Mask"	Diane M. Fresco	February 15, 1997
The Mask travels through time to the 23rd century to find the robot who ripped his trousers, but soon becomes involved in a war over the mask between megalomaniacal future mayor Government Guy and a team of rebels.
40	25	"Sealed Fate"	Tracy Berna	February 22, 1997
Stanley has to sell Putterware food-storage products to pay The Mask's bills, but Peggy learns that the leftovers are coming to life.
41	26	"(The Angels Wanna Wear My) Green Mask"	Marty Isenberg and Robert N. Skir	February 28, 1997
The Mask and Lt. Kellaway are killed by The Phony Frenchman's bomb and a council of angels compare their lives to determine which will gain entrance to Heaven. When Kellaway proves that The Mask is Stanley, the angelic council reveals a horrible secret about themselves.
42	27	"Mutiny of the Bounty Hunters"	Steve Cuden	March 7, 1997
Stanley babysits for his neighbor again, and the baby pursues a pet bird. Meanwhile, Pretorious hires bounty hunters Tex Clobber and Baxter Simon to help him capture The Mask.
43	28	"Convention of Evil"	Dean Stefan	March 14, 1997
During a group therapy session with by Dr. Neuman, the criminals Pretorius, Gorgonzola, Lonnie the Shark, Pete, Bub, The Tempest, The Stinger, and others discuss the many times The Mask has thwarted their plans. (Clip show)
44	29	"The Green Marine"	Thomas Hart	March 21, 1997
The Mask is court martialed for his unorthodox actions while serving in the US Marines, involving Lonnie the Shark's theft of a battleship.
45	30	"Counterfeit Mask"	Alexx Van Dyne	March 28, 1997
Stanley is accused of counterfeiting money after mistakenly taking a smuggler's luggage at the airport. Meanwhile, Peggy gets her hands on The Mask and fulfills her dream of being glamorous, which includes ensnaring Lt Kellaway in marriage.

=== Season 3 (1997) ===
No. overall	No. in season	Title	Written by	Original release date
46	1	"Magic"	Steve Roberts	July 5, 1997
Stanley reunites with his high school crush, Davida Steelmine, who is now a magician and master thief.
47	2	"Little Big Mask"	Thomas Hart	July 12, 1997
The Mask creates an anti-aging cream, which makes him (and Stanley) younger by the minute.
48	3	"Fantashtick Voyage"	Bob Ardiel	July 19, 1997
A computer virus named Cybermite infects Milo, and The Mask goes inside Milo's body to stop it.
49	4	"They Came from Within"	Alexx Van Dyne	July 26, 1997
The Mask is sucked into a comic book world where the evil Dark Star Trio mistakes Lt. Kellaway for their archenemy Galactic Avenger.
50	5	"To Have and Have Snot"	Alexx Van Dyne	August 2, 1997
Pretorius uses Peggy's phlegm to create a giant mucus monster that infects the people of Edge City. Stanley learns that having a cold while wearing the mask has unpredictable and ultimately fatal side effects.
51	6	"Mystery Cruise"	Henry Gilroy	August 9, 1997
Stanley, Milo, Peggy, Charlie, Mrs. Peenman, Lt. Kellaway, and Doyle are tricked into boarding a cruise to celebrate The Mask's birthday. Pretorius uses the ship to test his latest weapon, planning to create a tsunami and destroy Edge City.
52	7	"The Goofalotatots"	John Arcudi	August 16, 1997
Stanley as The Mask meets his favorite cartoon characters The Goofalotatots: Stinko, Pinko, and Snot. What he doesn't know is that they're evil robot duplicates built by Pretorius in a plot to disable Edge City's officials.
53	8	"When Pigs Ruled the Earth"	J.D. Smith	August 23, 1997
The Mask and Peggy are sent to a future where pigs rule over mankind.
54	9	"The Aceman Cometh"	Duane Capizzi	August 30, 1997
Stanley's dog Milo has his brain switched with a scientist and is then kidnapped by Pretorious. Stanley hires Ace Ventura, a pet detective, to help find him. Ace's pet monkey, Spike, steals the mask, and Stanley follows them to Miami to retrieve it. Note: This episode is the first part of a crossover with Ace Ventura: Pet Detective, concluding in that series' episode "Have Mask Will Travel".

== Crossover ==
A two-part crossover between The Mask and Ace Ventura: Pet Detective – another animated series based on a Jim Carrey film – aired on August 30, 1997. The crossover begins with The Mask episode "The Aceman Cometh", and concludes with the Ace Ventura episode "Have Mask, Will Travel". At the time of the original airing, Ace Ventura: Pet Detective was running in the adjoining time slot immediately following The Mask in CBS' Saturday morning lineup. During the crossover, Stanley/The Mask and Ace retain their respective animation styles while appearing within the other's show. The crossover also serves as the series finale of The Mask and the second-season finale of Ace Ventura. In "Have Mask, Will Travel", Stanley catches up to Ace in Miami just as he is recruited to solve a case on a space station, leading Stanley to become The Mask and join the investigation.

== Syndication ==
New Line Television sold the syndication rights of the series to Bohbot Entertainment in 1996, who aired it as part of their newly-created weekday broadcast of Amazin' Adventures. The second season premiered this way, although the show continued to air on CBS (airing seasons one and three).

It later aired on the Fox Family Channel from 1999 to 2000 (with "Flight as a Feather" removed due to risqué content). The show has rerun sporadically on Cartoon Network and Boomerang channels in other countries, with some markets skipping over the season two episode "Flight as a Feather," again, due to risqué content. Starting in 2024, reruns aired on MeTV Toons, with "Flight as a Feather" airing uncut and uncensored.

== Home media ==
=== VHS ===
Eight VHS volumes of the series were gradually released by Turner Home Entertainment/New Line Home Video from 1995 to 1996, all of which are now out of print.

Title	Episodes featured
The Mask is Always Greener on the Other Side	Pilot: "The Mask is Always Greener on the Other Side" Parts 1 and 2 abridged into one episode
Baby's Wild Ride	"Baby's Wild Ride" and "The Terrible Twos"
S-s-somebody Stop Me!	"Sister Mask" and "Shadow of a Skillit"
Milo Mask	"How Much Is That Dog in the Tin Can?" and "Martian Mask"
Shrink Rap (Released in the UK only)	"Shrink Rap"
Mayor Mask (Released only in Australia and Russia)	"Mayor Mask" and "Double Reverse"
Split Personality (Released only in Australia and Russia)	"Shrink Rap" and "Split Personality"
Santa Mask (Released only in Europe, Brazil, and South Korea)	"Santa Mask" with 15 minutes of extra footage

=== DVD ===
Upon the initial DVD release of Son of the Mask, Wal-Mart stores sold an exclusive 2-pack of the movie with the two-part pilot episode of the animated series. On April 10, 2018, Warner Bros. released the first season on DVD. As of this writing, the second and third seasons have not been released on DVD or Blu-ray. Despite this, iTunes, Amazon Video, YouTube, and Google Play have every episode available (including the infamous "Flight as a Feather" episode, with no edits for content) for streaming or digital download (meanwhile, as of May 2026, Tubi no longer has The Mask: The Animated Series uploaded).

== Merchandise ==
Taco Bell distributed toys based on the cartoon for a short time in 1997. In South Africa, the Spur franchise used to give out Mask toys with kiddies' burgers.
