= Reed Alexander =

American journalist, author, and actor

- Born: December 23, 1994 (age 31); Boca Raton, Florida, U.S.
- Education: New York University (BA); Columbia University (MA)
- Occupations: Journalist; lecturer; author; actor
- Years active: 2002–present

Reed Alexander (born December 23, 1994) is an American actor, journalist, and author. He is currently a correspondent for Insider, formerly “Business Insider,” covering the business of entertainment and the global media industry. Among his most recognizable credentials from his time as an actor is his role as Nevel Papperman in Nickelodeon's iCarly. He reprised the role of Nevel on an episode of Sam & Cat as well as the Paramount+ revival of iCarly.

== Career ==
Alexander first received recognition for his food blog that began in 2009 which turned into a second career as a spokesman for healthy eating habits. He appeared in Will & Grace for which he was nominated for a Young Artist Award for Best Performance in a Television Series (Comedy) – Guest Starring Actor. He was also in 2009's direct-to-video telefilm Ace Ventura Jr.: Pet Detective.

Alexander attended the first inauguration of Barack Obama after "helping out [a] local grass roots campaigns for one of the political parties in the Presidential Election of 2008." Alexander has been a spokesperson for the American Heart Association and Clinton Foundation's anti-obesity program called Alliance for a Healthier Generation, has been involved in promoting Michelle Obama's Let's Move! initiative, and has been credited with being able to get healthy eating messages to young audiences. He has published a website on healthy eating geared toward young people and a book, KewlBites: 100 Nutritious, Delicious, and Family-Friendly Dishes (2013).

Alexander obtained his undergraduate degree in media studies and broadcast journalism from New York University. As of 2020, he had graduated with his master's of science in journalism at Columbia University. He is currently an entertainment reporter (and previously, a Wall Street reporter) at Insider Inc. Starting in 2022, Alexander started a new position as a Lecturer for Journalism Studies at the University of Miami.

== Filmography ==
Film and television roles
Year	Title	Role	Notes
2002	A Bored Happiness	Ray	Short film
2005	Pool Guys		TV movie
2005–2006	Will & Grace	Jordy Truman / Jordan Truman	2 episodes
2007	If I Had Known I Was a Genius	Gifted Kid #1	Film
2007	Magnus, Inc.	Percival	Short film
2007–2012	iCarly	Nevel Papperman	Recurring role, 8 episodes
2007	Out of Jimmy's Head	C. Kingsley Weatherhead	Episode: "Bully"
2009	Ace Ventura Jr.: Pet Detective	Pennington Jr.	TV movie
2011	Kickin' It	Truman	Episode: "Dummy Dancing"
2014	Sam & Cat	Nevel Papperman	Episode: "#SuperPsycho"
2021–2023	iCarly (2021 revival)	Nevel Papperman	2 episodes
