= Ace Ventura =

Fictional character

- Ace Ventura character
- Jim Carrey as Ace Ventura in Ace Ventura: Pet Detective (1994)
- First appearance: Ace Ventura: Pet Detective
- Created by: Jack Bernstein
- Portrayed by: Jim Carrey
- Voiced by: Michael Daingerfield (Ace Ventura: Pet Detective)

In-universe information
- Gender: Male
- Occupation: Pet detective; Adventurer; Hero
- Spouse: Melissa Robinson Ventura (wife)
- Children: Ace Ventura Jr. (son)
- Relatives: Rex Ventura (father)

Ace Irwin Ventura Sr. is a fictional character created by screenwriter Jack Bernstein. Ace was performed by Jim Carrey in the films Ace Ventura: Pet Detective, released in 1994, and Ace Ventura: When Nature Calls, released in 1995, and was voiced by Michael Daingerfield in the Ace Ventura: Pet Detective television series.

== Biography ==
Ace is a Miami-based private detective specializing in the retrieval of missing animals, the son of Rex Ventura and descendant of such as "Ernest Ventura Shackleton" and "Jacques Ventura Cousteau". It is not known whether the animated television series was contiguous with the feature films, but if it was it may take place before them because the only one of his pets to appear in the series is his capuchin monkey, Spike. His eccentricities make him a laughing stock to the Miami-Dade Police Department in the early part of the first film, but he eventually earned their respect after his rescue of quarterback Dan Marino and the dolphin, Snowflake, the mascot of the Miami Dolphins.

=== Ace Ventura: Pet Detective ===
During the first film, Ace lives in an apartment alongside many different animals dubbed his "jungle friends," all of whom hide from his landlord (to whom he owes money for rent), Mr. Shickadance (Mark Margolis) in his absence. He is tasked with not only finding a stolen dolphin, but also trying to prevent the kidnapping of Dan Marino from a psychopath ex-football player, Ray Finkle, bent on revenge for costing the Dolphins the game with the botched field goal against the San Francisco 49ers in Super Bowl XIX. He is certain that Finkle is the man responsible, but he can't find Finkle. Ace also learns of a missing hiker who coincidentally is named Lois Einhorn, who is a lieutenant of the Miami Police department and tries to figure out the connection she has with his suspect. Eventually, Ace not only discovers the connection that Finkle has with Einhorn, but also that they're the same person in disguise. As the real Lois Einhorn was still missing, Finkle had used the opportunity to steal her identity by having a sex-change and then joined the police force as part of his plan for revenge. Disgusted by the thought that when he had been previously kissed by Einhorn, he had actually been kissed by a man, Ace spends the night vomiting, rinsing his mouth out and washing himself. Following Einhorn to the hideout inside a wharf, he tries to test his theory on her, but finds a normal feminine body and actual hair. Before Ace was about to give up, Marino secretly alerts him to a bulge sticking between her legs. With concrete proof, Ace makes a short humiliating speech at Einhorn while revealing to the entire Miami PD about her true motive in killing Roger Podacter, when he discovered her true identity as Ray Finkle ("He found Captain Winky"). He proves it by forcibly turning Einhorn over to reveal the bulge sticking out of her silk panties. Marino, Snowflake and the rest of the cops, react in disgust when they learn that Finkle had kissed them the same way as Ace was kissed. Now exposed and humiliated, enraged Finkle makes his last attempt to kill Ace out of revenge, but he flips him over into the wharf. As he attempts to pull himself up, Ace steps over Finkle's hand and takes the ring which was indeed missing a stone to finalize his theory by proving that Lois Einhorn is the disgraced Ray Finkle. Ace begins a relationship with Miami Dolphins' press officer, Melissa Robinson, while Lois Einhorn a.k.a Ray Finkle is arrested. In an attempt to capture the white pigeon a rich man is offering a $25,000 reward for—-the Philadelphia Eagles mascot shoos it away. Ace and him fight and Ace pins him to the ground at the Super Bowl game.

=== Ace Ventura: When Nature Calls ===
During the second film, Ace attempts monasticism after a failed rescue attempt of a raccoon, only to be called out of retirement to investigate a missing bat named Shikaka, although he has a severe fear of bats. During meditation with the Abbot, he discovers Vincent Cadby who originally hired him to find the bat is the same kidnapper who wanted the war to happen so he can take control of the guano deposits there. His motive for hiring Ace was to have an alibi, that he tried to prevent the war. He thwarts Cadby's plans to have the two tribes go to war and returns the sacred bat. After the marriage between the Wachati chief's daughter and Tiny Warrior, Ace is eventually hunted down by both tribes, implying he had something to do with the princess no longer being a virgin.

== Family ==
By the events portrayed in Ace Ventura Jr.: Pet Detective, it is established that after resolving his case in Africa, Ace returned to Miami and started a family. He married Melissa and they had a son, Ace Jr., but Ace has disappeared somewhere in the Bermuda Triangle, and never appears in the film itself. However, Ace Jr. inherited his ability to discern trouble, which he must rely on when he must assist in finding his classmates' pets along with the missing animals and clear his mother's name when she is accused of the theft. Ace Jr. believes her innocence and seeks the help of his grandfather, Rex, to help him investigate the whole thing. They begin to suspect that one of his classmates was involved in the theft and with the help of A-Plus, Ace Jr. suspects that Pennington Jr. had been involved with Dr. Sickenger (who is insane). Sickenger is found to be innocent and he helps lead Ace Jr. along with Rex to the true culprit, Quinton Pennington Sr. After finding the animals in the Pennington family home, Pennington Sr. confesses to his crime, admitting that he stole the pets along with the famous animals because he was trying to keep his son happy. He eventually got fed up with his spoiled nature when he refused to be satisfied. Melissa is cleared of the theft charges and Pennington Sr. is arrested for his crimes. Ace Jr. is rewarded as a hero for his efforts.

== Personality ==
Ace Ventura is a potty and harebrained "pet detective" who forsook regular police work to concentrate on this latter pursuit. Like other fictional detectives, he is notable for extraordinary powers of observation and deduction: he also possesses the ability to "understand" animals, and on at least one occasion, he has managed to escape being shot by catching a bullet in his teeth and is shown to be a capable hand to hand fighter.

Ventura's eccentricities include his constant rudeness; despite this, he is a dedicated detective, driven by an insatiable adoration of animals and a desire to protect them from human mistreatment. In Ace Ventura Jr.: Pet Detective, it is implied that his abilities, personality and appearance are hereditary. Although Ace is an animal lover, Ace Ventura: When Nature Calls reveals that he has a deep-seated fear of bats.

In most appearances, Ace usually wears an unbuttoned Hawaiian shirt over a plain white A-shirt, with striped pants of various colors and black combat boots.

== Crossover with The Mask ==
In the episode, "The Aceman Cometh" of The Mask: Animated Series, when Milo, the pet dog of Stanley Ipkiss, was stolen by Dr. Pretorius, Ipkiss calls Ace for help. Both Ipkiss/the Mask and Ace Ventura were the animated versions of characters portrayed by Jim Carrey himself. The crossover continued in the Ace Ventura: Pet Detective episode "Have Mask, Will Travel", in which Ace accidentally wears the mask on his buttocks, which assumes a face akin to his own and gains the ability to speak, suggesting a joke featured in Ace Ventura: Pet Detective of speaking while presenting his rump to Emilio and moving it akin to a speaking mouth.

== Reception ==
Ace was ranked the 60th greatest movie character in a November 2008 list by Empire. Despite his popularity, he was also voted one of the most annoying film characters ever in a British online poll.
