= Ace Ventura: Pet Detective =

1994 film by Tom Shadyac

- Theatrical release poster
- Directed by: Tom Shadyac
- Screenplay by: Jack Bernstein; Tom Shadyac; Jim Carrey
- Story by: Jack Bernstein
- Produced by: James G. Robinson
- Starring: Jim Carrey; Sean Young; Courteney Cox; Tone Loc; Dan Marino
- Cinematography: Julio Macat
- Edited by: Don Zimmerman
- Music by: Ira Newborn
- Production company: Morgan Creek Productions
- Distributed by: Warner Bros.
- Release date: February 4, 1994
- Running time: 86 minutes
- Country: United States
- Language: English
- Budget: $15 million
- Box office: $107.2 million

Ace Ventura: Pet Detective is a 1994 American comedy film starring Jim Carrey as Ace Ventura, an animal detective who is tasked with finding the abducted dolphin mascot of the Miami Dolphins football team. The film is directed by Tom Shadyac, who wrote the screenplay with Jack Bernstein and Carrey. The film co-stars Courteney Cox, Tone Loc, Sean Young, and then–Miami Dolphins quarterback Dan Marino and features a cameo appearance from death metal band Cannibal Corpse.

Morgan Creek Productions produced the film on a budget of $15 million, and Warner Bros. released the film on February 4, 1994. It grossed $72.2 million in the United States and Canada and $35 million in other territories for a worldwide total of $107.2 million. It received mixed reviews from critics. Carrey's performance led to the film having a cult following among male adolescents. In addition to launching Carrey's film career, it started a franchise, spawning the sequel film Ace Ventura: When Nature Calls (1995), the animated television series Ace Ventura: Pet Detective (1995–2000), and later, standalone made-for-television sequel Ace Ventura Jr.: Pet Detective (2009).

== Plot ==
Ace Ventura, an eccentric private detective in Miami, specializes in rescuing animals and is frequently mocked by the Miami Police Department. After the Miami Dolphins' mascot, a bottlenose dolphin named Snowflake, is stolen from the team's stadium, publicist Melissa Robinson hires Ventura to recover the dolphin before the upcoming Super Bowl.

Ventura's investigation leads him to suspect billionaire Ronald Camp, a collector of exotic animals, after finding an amber stone in Snowflake's tank. At a party at Camp's mansion, Ventura searches the property and narrowly escapes a shark. He later notices Camp wearing a 1984 AFC Championship ring containing an amber stone similar to the one he found, but determines Camp's stone is intact and rules him out. Ventura instead suspects a member of the 1984 Dolphins team, but finds all of the players' championship rings undamaged.

When Roger Podacter, the Dolphins' head of operations, dies in a fall from his apartment balcony, police rule it a suicide, but Ventura determines he was murdered. Investigating further, Ventura and Robinson discover a former placekicker, Ray Finkle, who joined the team midseason and missed the game-winning field goal in the team's Super Bowl loss to the San Francisco 49ers. Finkle blamed quarterback Dan Marino for the mistake and was later committed to a psychiatric facility for threatening to kill him; he escaped and disappeared.

Believing Finkle may target Robinson as well as Marino, Ventura takes her to his apartment for protection. The following day, Ventura travels to Finkle's hometown in rural Collier County and confirms Finkle's history and his obsession with revenge against Marino. Before Ventura can return to Miami, Marino is kidnapped.

Ventura and Robinson break into the facility from which Finkle escaped and find a newspaper clipping referencing a missing hiker named Lois Einhorn. A police contact discovers a love letter from Podacter addressed to Einhorn, leading Ventura to conclude that Finkle assumed Einhorn's identity and infiltrated the police department.

On the day of the Super Bowl between the Dolphins and the Philadelphia Eagles, Ventura follows Einhorn to a boat storage facility where Marino and Snowflake are being held. Einhorn holds Ventura at gunpoint, intending to kill him and Marino and frame Ventura for the kidnapping. After a struggle, officers arrive and Einhorn orders them to shoot Ventura, but he strips off her skirt and turns her around, revealing her tucked male genitals, prompting a shocked reaction from Marino, Snowflake, and the officers present. Einhorn is arrested, and Marino and Snowflake are returned in time for the second half of the Super Bowl. Ventura is publicly recognized as a hero, and the film ends with him fighting the Eagles' mascot over a missing rare pigeon.

== Cast ==
- Jim Carrey as Ace Ventura, a private investigator who specializes in rescuing and recovering animals
- Sean Young as Lt. Lois Einhorn / Ray Finkle, a disgraced field goal kicker disguised as a woman, now a Miami detective seeking revenge against Dan Marino
- Courteney Cox as Melissa Robinson, the publicist for the Dolphins football team
- Tone Lōc as Emilio, a police detective connected to Ace
- Dan Marino as Himself
- Noble Willingham as Riddle, the owner of the Dolphins
- John Capodice as Sgt. Aguado, a Miami detective known to hassle Ace
- Raynor Scheine as Woodstock, a club owner connected to Ace who secretly runs an underground animal activist movement
- Frank Adonis as Vinnie
- Tiny Ron as Roc
- Troy Evans as Roger Podacter, head of operations for the Miami Dolphins
- Udo Kier as Ronald Camp, a wealthy tycoon known for collecting exotic animals
- David Margulies as Doctor
- Bill Zuckert as Mr. Finkle, Ray's father
- Judy Clayton as Martha Mertz
- Alice Drummond as Mrs. Finkle, Ray's mother
- Rebecca Ferratti as Sexy Woman
- Mark Margolis as Mr. Shickadance, Ace's landlord with a zero-tolerance stance for animals
- Randall "Tex" Cobb as Gruff Man
- Cannibal Corpse as themselves

== Production ==
The chairman and CEO of Morgan Creek Productions, James G. Robinson, in the early 1990s, sought to produce a comedy that would have wide appeal. Gag writer Tom Shadyac pitched a rewrite of the script to Robinson and was hired as director for what was his directorial debut. Filmmakers first approached Rick Moranis to play Ace Ventura, but Moranis declined the role. They then considered casting Judd Nelson or Alan Rickman, and they also considered changing Ace Ventura to be female and casting Whoopi Goldberg as the pet detective. David Alan Grier also turned down the offer to play Ace Ventura, and Thomas Haden Church tested for the role as well. Grier later said he thought the script was bad and faulted himself for not seeing the potential to do whatever he wanted with it like Carrey ultimately did. Ultimately Robinson noticed Jim Carrey's performance in the sketch comedy show In Living Color and cast him as Ace Ventura. Lauren Holly turned down the role of Melissa Robinson, which eventually went to Courteney Cox.

Carrey helped rewrite the script, and filmmakers allowed him to improvise on set. Carrey said of his approach, "I knew this movie was going to either be something that people really went for, or it was going to ruin me completely. From the beginning of my involvement, I said that the character had to be rock 'n' roll. He had to be the 007 of pet detectives. I wanted to be unstoppably ridiculous, and they let me go wild." He said he sought comedic moments that would be unappealing to some, "I wanted to keep the action unreal and over the top. When it came time to do my reaction to kissing a man, I wanted it to be the biggest, most obnoxious, homophobic reaction ever recorded. It's so ridiculous it can't be taken seriously—even though it guarantees that somebody's going to be offended."

The death metal band Cannibal Corpse performed their song "Hammer Smashed Face" in the film at the request of Jim Carrey, who personally selected the band for the film; the band originally had scheduling conflicts with a European tour, but the crew adjusted their filming schedule to accommodate the band to be able to participate in the film. Their appearance in the film significantly increased their visibility, attracting a broader audience beyond their typical fan base.

The filming took place in Miami, Florida in the second quarter of 1993. The film was produced on a budget of $15 million.

== Music ==
The film score was composed by Ira Newborn. The soundtrack, produced by Morgan Creek Records, included a variety of songs by other musicians.

No.	Title	Performed by	Length
1.	"Power of Suggestion"	Steve Stevens and Perry McCarty	4:38
2.	"All Ace's"	Ira Newborn	2:41
3.	"The Lion Sleeps Tonight"	Robert John	2:35
4.	"Psychoville - Ace Race"	Ira Newborn	4:38
5.	"Theme from Mission: Impossible"	Lalo Schifrin	0:54
6.	"Ace of Hearts"	Ira Newborn	4:04
7.	"Hammer Smashed Face"	Cannibal Corpse	4:05
8.	"Line Up"	Aerosmith	4:14
9.	"The Crying Game"	Boy George	3:21
10.	"Warehouse"	Ira Newborn	5:05
11.	"Finkle & Einhorn"	Ira Newborn	2:36
12.	"Ace in the Hole"	Ira Newborn	1:54
13.	"Ace Is in the House"	Tone Loc and Jim Carrey	4:34

== Release ==
Warner Bros. released Ace Ventura: Pet Detective in 1,750 theaters in the United States and Canada on February 4, 1994. The film grossed $12.1 million on its opening weekend, ranking first at the box office and outperforming other new releases My Father the Hero and I'll Do Anything. Opening-weekend audiences surveyed by CinemaScore gave the film a grade "A−" on a scale of A to F. For its second weekend, it grossed $9.7 million and ranked first at the box office again, outperforming newcomers The Getaway, Blank Check, and My Girl 2. Variety reported of Ace Ventura's second weekend in box office performance, "The goofball comedy defied dire predictions by trackers, slipping just 20% for a three-day average of $5,075 and $24.6 million in 10 days." The Los Angeles Times reported, "Audiences are responding enthusiastically to Carrey's frenzied antics... [The film] is especially a hit with the 10- to 20-year-old age group it was originally targeted for. Box-office grosses indicate that many fans are going back to see the film again." It grossed $72.2 million in the United States and Canada and $35 million in other territories for a worldwide total of $107.2 million. The film's US box office performance led Variety to label it a "sleeper hit". Its best performance overseas was in Italy. On home video, Ace Ventura sold 4.2 million home videos in its first three weeks, which Los Angeles Times called "just as powerful a draw" as its theatrical run.

Carrey also starred in The Mask and Dumb and Dumber later in the year. The three films had a total box office gross of $550 million, which ranked Carrey as the second highest-grossing box office star in 1994, behind Tom Hanks.

The Hollywood Reporter said before Ace Ventura, Jim Carrey was "seen mainly as TV talent" and that the film's success "firmly [established] him as a big-screen presence". The film's success also led Morgan Creek Productions to produce the 1995 sequel Ace Ventura: When Nature Calls with Carrey reprising his role. Author Victoria Flanagan wrote that Carrey's performance "generated cult success for the film among adolescent male viewers". The Hollywood Reporter wrote that it "gained a loyal cult following through frequent TV airings". NME wrote in retrospect that the film was a "cult 1990s comedy".

Ace Ventura: Pet Detective was released on VHS on June 14, 1994, on DVD on August 26, 1997, and Blu-ray on September 3, 2013, by Warner Home Video. Sony Pictures Home Entertainment released the film on Blu-ray in a 25th Anniversary Edition in April 2019. Shout! Studios released the film on 4K Ultra HD Blu-ray on July 29, 2025.

== Critical reception ==
The Los Angeles Times reported at the time, "Not many critics have been charmed by Ace Ventura's exploits, and several have charged that the film's humor is mean-spirited, needlessly raunchy and homophobic." A biography of Carrey wrote that "the fans loved him and the critics hated him". Ace Ventura: Pet Detective received "generally unfavorable" reviews from contemporary critics, according to review aggregator Metacritic, which assessed 14 reviews and categorized six as negative, five as positive, and three as mixed. It gave the film an overall score of 37 out of 100. The review aggregation website Rotten Tomatoes assessed a sample of 65 contemporary and retrospective reviews as positive or negative and said 48% of the critics gave positive reviews with an average rating of 4.9/10. In 2019, Rotten Tomatoes wrote of the consensus, "Jim Carrey's twitchy antics and gross-out humor are on full, bombastic display in Ace Ventura: Pet Detective, which is great news for fans of his particular brand of comedy but likely unsatisfying for anyone else."

Roger Ebert, reviewing for the Chicago Sun-Times, said, "I found the movie a long, unfunny slog through an impenetrable plot." Ebert described the lead role, "Carrey plays Ace as if he's being clocked on an Energy-O-Meter, and paid by the calories expended. He's a hyper goon who likes to screw his mouth into strange shapes while playing variations on the language." The New York Times film critic Stephen Holden said, "The comic actor Jim Carrey gives one of the most hyperactive performances ever brought to the screen... Only a child could love Mr. Carrey's character, but that may be the point. The movie has the metabolism, logic, and attention span of a peevish 6-year-old." He said of Ace Ventura's animals, "The few scenes of Ace communicating with his animals hint at an endearing wackiness that is abruptly undercut by the movie's ridiculous plot."

The Washington Post's film critics Rita Kempley and Desson Howe reviewed the film positively. Kempley said, "A riot from start to finish, Carrey's first feature comedy is as cheerfully bawdy as it is idiotically inventive." She added, "A spoof of detective movies, the story touches all the bases." Howe said that the film "is a mindless stretch of nonsense" and highlighted multiple "Carreyisms along the way". Howe concluded, "There are some unfortunate elements that were unnecessary—a big strain of homophobic jokes for one, profane and sexual situations that rule out the kiddie audience for another. But essentially, Ace is an unsophisticated opportunity to laugh at the mischief Carrey's body parts can get up to."

James Berardinelli said, "The comic momentum sputters long before the running time has elapsed." Berardinelli said of Carrey that he "uses his rubber features and goofy personae" that succeeds for a short time but after that, "Carrey's act gradually grows less humorous and more tiresome, and the laughter in the audience seems forced." The critic said the film has "its moments" of humor but considered there to be "a lot of dead screen time" in between.

While Michael MacCambridge of Austin American-Statesman named it as an honorable mention of his list of the best films of 1994, Rocky Mountain News's Rober Denerstein listed it as the second worst of the year.

== Accolades ==
Award	Ceremony	Result	Notes	Ref.
American Comedy Award for Funniest Lead Actor in a Motion Picture	1995 American Comedy Awards	Nominated		
Blockbuster Entertainment Award for Favorite Male Newcomer, On Video	1st Blockbuster Entertainment Awards	Won		
Blockbuster Entertainment Award for Favorite Actor - Comedy, On Video	1st Blockbuster Entertainment Awards	Won		
Chicago Film Critics Association Most Promising Actor Award	Chicago Film Critics Association Awards 1995	Nominated	Also nominated for The Mask	
Golden Raspberry Award for Worst New Star	15th Golden Raspberry Awards	Nominated	Also nominated for Dumb and Dumber and The Mask	
London Film Critics' Circle Newcomer of the Year Award	1995 London Film Critics' Circle Awards	Won	Also won for The Mask	
MTV Movie Award for Best Comedic Performance	1994 MTV Movie Awards	Nominated		
Nickelodeon Kids' Choice Award for Favorite Movie Actor	1995 Kids' Choice Awards	Won		

== Transgender portrayal ==
In the film, the male ex-football player Finkle disguises himself over an extended period of time as the female police lieutenant Einhorn. Based on Ace Ventura's reaction to, and outing of, Einhorn as Finkle, the film has been criticized for the way it portrays transgender people. New Vistas outlined the negative portrayal: "the transgender character was the villain of the film and her body/being attracted to her, made characters physically ill. Additionally, the film showed transphobic behaviours by the main character who ridiculed, humiliated, misgendered, and exposed the body of the trans female character without her consent."

Alexandra Gonzenbach Perkins wrote in Representing Queer and Transgender Identity that mainstream representation of transgender identity at the turn of the 21st century was limited, observing that "the representations that did exist tended to pathologize transgender people as mentally unstable". Perkins said Ace Ventura, along with The Crying Game (1992), depicted "transgender characters as murderous villains". In the book Reclaiming Genders, in a chapter focusing on transgender identity, Gordene O. Mackenzie references Ace Ventura as an example of turn-of-the-century films that "illustrate the transphobia implicit in many popular US films". Mackenzie describes the scene in which Ace Ventura retches in the bathroom, following the revelation that the woman he had kissed is trans, as "one of the most memorable and blatantly transphobic/homophobic scenes". In The New York Times in 2016, Farhad Manjoo also wrote about this scene, "There was little culturally suspect then about playing gender identity for laughs. Instead, as in many fictional depictions of transgender people in that era, the scene’s prevailing emotion is of nose-holding disgust."

Lucy J. Miller, in the book Distancing Representations in Transgender Film: Identification, Affect, and the Audience, analyzed Ace Ventura: Pet Detective's parody of The Crying Game. Miller noted that the film reproduces The Crying Game's infamous "reveal" sequence, in which a character reacts with disgust upon learning of a partner's transgender identity. In Ace Ventura, the scene is extended for comic effect, with Ventura brushing his teeth, pouring toothpaste down his throat, using a plunger on his lips, burning his clothes, and sobbing in the shower. The parody is repeated later when Ventura exposes Einhorn's body, leading to a collective gesture of disgust from the surrounding police officers. Miller argued that the length and intensity of Ventura's reaction implies that the disgust expressed in The Crying Game was inadequate, reinforcing the message that audiences should regard transgender bodies with revulsion.

== Future ==
In October 2017, Morgan Creek Entertainment announced plans to reboot several films from its library, including Ace Ventura: Pet Detective. Its president David Robinson said Morgan Creek's plan was not to simply remake the film but to do a follow-up in which Ace Ventura passes the mantle to a new character, such as a long-lost son or daughter. In 2018, according to Ace Ventura: When Nature Calls co-star Tommy Davidson, Carrey displayed a lack of interest in participating.

By March 2021, a sequel film was in development at Amazon Studios with the screenwriters of the 2020 film Sonic the Hedgehog, Pat Casey and Josh Miller, attached.
