= Morgan Creek Entertainment =

American film studio

Morgan Creek Entertainment, LLC
- Logo used since 2001
- Formerly: Morgan Creek Productions, Inc. (1987-2017)
- Type: Film production company
- Industry: Film & television
- Predecessor: International Productions Inc.
- Founded: 1987; 39 years ago
- Founder: James G. Robinson; Joe Roth
- Headquarters: Los Angeles, California, United States
- Key people: David C. Robinson; Brian Robinson
- Website: morgancreek.com

Morgan Creek Entertainment is an American film production company that has released box-office hits including Young Guns, Dead Ringers, Major League, True Romance, Ace Ventura: Pet Detective, The Crush, Robin Hood: Prince of Thieves, and The Last of the Mohicans. The studio was founded in 1987 by James G. Robinson and Joe Roth. Robinson led the company as chairman and CEO. His two sons, Brian Robinson and David C. Robinson, run the day-to-day operations. The company name comes from Roth's favorite film, The Miracle of Morgan's Creek. Their most recent film is The Exorcist: Believer, which was released on October 6, 2023.

Morgan Creek Productions generally releases films through larger studios while retaining the copyrights, and making autonomous decisions on home video and television rights. The company logo contains a stylized creek.

== History ==
In 1984, James G. Robinson, while working at Subaru, formed his first independent production company Independent Productions, Inc. The company produced The Stone Boy, Grunt! The Wrestling Movie, Girls Just Want to Have Fun, Where the River Runs Black, and Streets of Gold. The company was supplanted in 1987 by Morgan Creek Productions.

Morgan Creek Productions' initial slate of films from 1988 to 1990 were released by 20th Century Fox, except for Renegades and Coupe de Ville, which were released by Universal Pictures, Major League, which was released by Paramount Pictures, and some home video releases of its early titles going to Media Home Entertainment. In 1991, beginning with Robin Hood: Prince of Thieves, the company shifted distribution of new films, as well as previous catalog titles, to Warner Bros., where they remained until early 2005. Later that year, beginning with Two for the Money, newer films were released through Universal, though previous films were still handled in the United States by Warner Bros.

In 1996, Morgan Creek Productions tried to expand into animated feature-film production. Only one, The King and I, was produced, and it flopped.

On July 11, 1997, Gary Barber announced that he would leave Morgan Creek Productions; he subsequently went on to found Spyglass Entertainment. In 1998, Morgan Creek Productions had a distribution deal with Warner Home Video to release its products through the Morgan Creek Video and Morgan Creek DVD labels.

In 1998, Morgan Creek Productions and Tribune Entertainment teamed up to make a TV series based on The Exorcist, but the project never got off the ground.

On October 8, 1998, Morgan Creek Productions and Franchise Pictures entered into an agreement whereby Morgan Creek Productions would distribute Franchise's upcoming films domestically via Warner Bros. On July 2, 2001, Morgan Creek Productions sued Franchise Pictures for allegedly breaching an agreement, giving the company the right of first refusal on some films.

In October 2014, following the bankruptcy of Inverness Distribution, Morgan Creek Productions' international distribution rights and copyrights to their films were sold to Revolution Studios for $36.75 million. In September 2015, Morgan Creek began negotiating the sale of rights for the remaining territories, though the company intended to retain remake and television rights to the Ace Ventura, Major League, Young Guns, and The Exorcist franchises. On February 15, 2026, co-founder and CEO James G. Robinson died aged 90.

== Filmography ==
=== Films ===
Release date	Title	Notes	Distributor(s)
August 12, 1988	Young Guns	first Morgan Creek production distributed by 20th Century Fox; international and home media distribution by Vestron Pictures	
September 23, 1988	Dead Ringers	co-production with Telefilm Canada and Mantle Clinic II	
March 3, 1989	Skin Deep		
April 7, 1989	Major League	co-production with Mirage Productions; U.S. distribution by Paramount Pictures	
June 2, 1989	Renegades	co-production with Interscope Communications; distributed by Universal Pictures	
December 13, 1989	Enemies, A Love Story		
February 16, 1990	Nightbreed		
March 9, 1990	Coupe de Ville	second and last Morgan Creek production distributed by Universal Pictures until 2005	
August 1, 1990	Young Guns II		
August 17, 1990	The Exorcist III		20th Century Fox (Worldwide excluding the Netherlands, Belgium, Australia and New Zealand); CNR Film Releasing (Netherlands and Belgium)
September 28, 1990	Pacific Heights	last Morgan Creek production distributed by 20th Century Fox	
June 14, 1991	Robin Hood: Prince of Thieves	first Morgan Creek production distributed by Warner Bros.; the film's score would become the music for Morgan Creek's animated logo	
January 17, 1992	Freejack		
March 27, 1992	Ladybugs	international distribution only; distributed in North America by Paramount Pictures	
April 24, 1992	White Sands		
August 14, 1992	Stay Tuned		
September 25, 1992	The Last of the Mohicans	international distribution only; distributed in North America by 20th Century Fox	
April 2, 1993	The Crush		
September 10, 1993	True Romance	co-production with Davis Films	Warner Bros. (United States, Canada and United Kingdom); United International Pictures (Germany and Austria); Concorde Entertainment Group (Netherlands and Belgium); Roadshow Film Distributors (Australia and New Zeeland); Tripictures (Spain)
February 4, 1994	Ace Ventura: Pet Detective		Warner Bros. (Worldwide excluding France, Belgium theatrically, Australia, New Zealand, Italy, Scandinavia, Portugal and Japan); AMLF (France); Independent Films Distribution (Belgium); Roadshow Film Distributors (Australia and New Zeeland); Artisti Associati (Italy); Svensk Filmindustri (Scandinavia); Toho-Towa (Japan)
March 30, 1994	Major League II		
April 22, 1994	Chasers		
September 9, 1994	Trial by Jury		
October 14, 1994	Imaginary Crimes		
October 28, 1994	Silent Fall		
November 10, 1995	Ace Ventura: When Nature Calls		Warner Bros. (Worldwide excluding France, Belgium theatrically, Australia, New Zealand, Italy, Scandinavia, Portugal and Japan); AMLF (France); PolyGram Filmed Entertainment (Belgium); Roadshow Film Distributors (Australia and New Zeeland); Medusa Film (Italy); Svensk Filmindustri (Scandinavia); Toho-Towa (Japan)
January 12, 1996	Two If by Sea		
January 26, 1996	Big Bully		
March 22, 1996	Diabolique		
November 1, 1996	Bad Moon		
July 2, 1997	Wild America		
March 13, 1998	Incognito		
April 17, 1998	Major League: Back to the Minors		
August 21, 1998	Wrongfully Accused	co-production with Constantin Film	Warner Bros. (United States, Canada, United Kingdom, Ireland and Scandinavia); Constantin Film (Germany and Austria); Independent Films (Netherlands); Belga Films (Belgium); Intersonic (Czech Republic)
October 23, 1998	Soldier	co-production with Warner Bros. and Jerry Weintraub Productions	Warner Bros. (Worldwide); Highlight Film (Germany, Austria and Switzerland); Linder Films (Spain)
March 19, 1999	The King and I	co-production with Nest Family Entertainment, Rankin/Bass Productions and Rich Animation Studios	Warner Bros. (Worldwide); Roadshow Film Distributors (Australia and New Zeeland); Svensk Filmindustri (Scandinavia); Linder Films; Aurum Producciones (Spain); Fourm Film (Israel)
September 1, 1999	Chill Factor		Warner Bros. (North and Latin America, the U.K., Ireland, Spain, Eastern Europe and Asia excluding Japan)
February 18, 2000	The Whole Nine Yards	North American distribution only; produced by Franchise Pictures, Rational Packaging and Lansdown Films	Warner Bros. Pictures (United States and Canada)
May 12, 2000	Battlefield Earth	North American distribution only; produced by Franchise Pictures	Warner Bros. Pictures (United States and Canada)
July 19, 2000	The In Crowd		
August 25, 2000	The Art of War	North American distribution only; produced by Franchise Pictures and Amen-Ra Films	Warner Bros. Pictures (United States and Canada)
October 6, 2000	Get Carter	North American distribution only; produced by Franchise Pictures	Warner Bros. Pictures (United States and Canada)
January 19, 2001	The Pledge	North American distribution only; produced by Franchise Pictures	Warner Bros. Pictures (United States and Canada)
February 23, 2001	3000 Miles to Graceland	North American distribution only; produced by Franchise Pictures	Warner Bros. Pictures (United States and Canada)
May 18, 2001	Angel Eyes	North American distribution only; produced by Franchise Pictures	Warner Bros. Pictures (United States and Canada)
August 17, 2001	American Outlaws		
November 9, 2001	Heist	North American distribution only; produced by Franchise Pictures	Warner Bros. Pictures (United States and Canada)
June 21, 2002	Juwanna Mann		
August 1, 2003	I'll Be There		
August 20, 2004	Exorcist: The Beginning		
May 20, 2005	Dominion: Prequel to the Exorcist	last Morgan Creek production distributed by Warner Bros.	
October 7, 2005	Two for the Money	first Morgan Creek production distributed by Universal Pictures since Coupe de Ville	
October 13, 2006	Man of the Year		
December 22, 2006	The Good Shepherd	co-production with Universal Pictures, TriBeCa Productions and American Zoetrope	
May 11, 2007	Georgia Rule		
September 21, 2007	Sydney White		
March 3, 2009	Ace Ventura Jr.: Pet Detective	Direct-to-video	Warner Bros. Pictures
September 30, 2011	Dream House		Universal Pictures (United States and Italy); Warner Bros. Pictures (United Kingdom, France, Spain, Australia, New Zealand and Latin America)
October 14, 2011	The Thing	co-production with Universal Pictures and Strike Entertainment	
June 16, 2017	All Eyez on Me	distributed by Lionsgate under Summit Entertainment; co-production with Program Pictures and Codeblack Films	
October 6, 2023	The Exorcist: Believer	co-production with Universal Pictures and Blumhouse Productions; direct sequel to the 1973 film	

==== Upcoming/In development ====
Release date	Title	Director	Story by	Screenwriter(s)	Producer(s)	Notes
March 12, 2027	The Exorcist: Martyrs	Mike Flanagan			Jason Blum; James G. Robinson; David C. Robinson; Mike Flanagan	co-production with Universal Pictures, Blumhouse Productions and Atomic Monster; reboot of the franchise
TBA	Dream House	TBA	TBA	TBA	TBA	remake of the 2011 film

=== Television series ===
- Ace Ventura: Pet Detective (1995–2000) (with Warner Bros. Television)
- The Exorcist (2016–2017) (with 20th Century Fox Television)
- Dead Ringers (2023) (with Amazon Studios, Astral Projection and Annapurna Television)

==== In development ====
- The Good Shepherd (with Showtime)
- Nightbreed
