= Ace Ventura: When Nature Calls =

1995 American film directed by Steve Oedekerk

- Theatrical release poster
- Directed by: Steve Oedekerk
- Written by: Steve Oedekerk
- Based on: Ace Ventura: Pet Detective by Jack Bernstein
- Produced by: James G. Robinson
- Starring: Jim Carrey; Ian McNeice; Simon Callow; Maynard Eziashi; Bob Gunton
- Cinematography: Donald E. Thorin
- Edited by: Malcolm Campbell
- Music by: Robert Folk
- Production company: Morgan Creek Productions
- Distributed by: Warner Bros.
- Release dates: November 8, 1995 (Regency Village Theatre); November 10, 1995 (United States)
- Running time: 94 minutes
- Country: United States
- Language: English
- Budget: $30 million
- Box office: $212.4 million

Ace Ventura: When Nature Calls (also known as Ace Ventura 2: When Nature Calls) is a 1995 American detective comedy film and the sequel to Ace Ventura: Pet Detective (1994), and the second installment of the Ace Ventura franchise. Jim Carrey reprises his role as the title character Ace Ventura, a detective who specializes in the retrieval of tame and captive animals that have escaped, who has been summoned to a fictional country in East Africa called Nibia to locate a missing bat. Ian McNeice, Simon Callow, and Sophie Okonedo co-star. Tommy Davidson, who co-starred with Carrey on the show In Living Color, makes a cameo appearance in the film.

The film was written and directed by Carrey's close friend Steve Oedekerk, who had also collaborated in the production and as a character consultant for the first film.

The film was produced by Morgan Creek Productions and was released on November 10, 1995, by Warner Bros. While the film received slightly better reviews than its predecessor, it was met with greater financial success, earning a total of $212.4 million at the box office against a budget of $30 million.

== Plot ==
After failing to save a raccoon from falling to its death (a parody of the movie Cliffhanger), private investigator Ace Ventura becomes depressed and retreats to a monastery in Tibet. African explorer Fulton Greenwall arrives and tells Ace that a job awaits him in Africa. Eager to be rid of Ace's antics, the monastery's Abbott declares that Ace has achieved enlightenment and should leave with Greenwall. The monks celebrate his departure.

Greenwall asks Ace to recover Shikaka, a sacred white bat belonging to the peaceful Wachati tribe in the fictional East African country of Nibia. If the bat is not returned within days, the Wachati will go to war with their rivals, the more savage Wachootoo tribe; its return would allow the Wachati princess to marry the Wachootoo prince. Ace arrives in Nibia and meets consul Vincent Cadby. Although he suffers from fear of bats, Ace investigates Shikaka's disappearance, befriends the Wachati, and meets their Chief, Prince Ouda, and the Princess, who were taught English by missionaries. The Princess develops a crush on Ace and attempts to seduce him.

Investigating Shikaka's cage in secret, because the Wachati forbid outsiders from entering the altar, Ace finds a raven feather and suspects Burton Quinn, owner of the Quinnland Safari Club. Quinn reveals that someone has already beaten him to the bat. Outside the safari, an unseen hunter repeatedly shoots Ace with darts, causing him to lose consciousness. The Wachati revive him, and the Princess suspects the Wachootoo are responsible because they want to prevent the wedding. Ouda takes Ace to confront the Wachootoo.

The Wachootoo mistake Ace for the "White Devil" and force him to undergo several challenges to prove his intentions. Ace succeeds at each except the final "Circle of Death," where their strongest warrior defeats him. His antics nevertheless amuse the tribe, which releases Ace and Ouda while warning that war will begin at noon the following day. As Ace leaves, the Wachootoo shoot him with another dart for amusement. Ace realizes that the earlier dart was different from theirs and had been carved from an acala. Following this clue, he finds two poachers with Shikaka. They tranquilize him, tie him to a raft, and send him over a waterfall.

Ace survives and continues investigating the plot. Through spiritual projection, he consults the Abbott, who helps him deduce that Cadby stole Shikaka to provoke war between the tribes and seize control of the lucrative guano market. The poachers are revealed to be Cadby's henchmen.

Ace confronts Cadby, who confesses and explains that he hired Ace to provide an alibi. With the local law enforcement on Cadby's payroll, Ace is arrested, but he summons various animals to escape and attack Cadby's mansion. Greenwall prevents Cadby from shooting Ace, but Cadby escapes with Shikaka in a Rover. Ace pursues him in a monster truck, eventually overtaking him and destroying the Rover.

Meanwhile, the Wachati and Wachootoo prepare for battle. Ace stops them by shouting Shikaka's name, prompting both tribes to kneel as he runs past. Ouda then spots Cadby in the jungle and identifies him as the "White Devil," revealing that both tribes know he stole Shikaka. They pursue Cadby, who escapes but encounters a gorilla that mistakes him for a mate. The Wachati Princess marries the Wachootoo Prince, revealed to be the warrior who defeated Ace in the "Circle of Death." The Princess is discovered to no longer be a virgin, as a result of Ace's actions. Nevertheless, peace is achieved when the two tribes unite and pursue Ace.

== Cast ==
- Jim Carrey as Ace Ventura, a private investigator who specializes in rescuing and recovering animals
- Ian McNeice as Fulton Greenwall, a Safari guide who works for Cadby
- Simon Callow as Vincent Cadby, the Chief General of Nibia
- Maynard Eziashi as Prince Ouda, the naive prince of the Wachiti Tribe
- Bob Gunton as Burton Quinn, the owner of the Quinnland Safari Club
- Sophie Okonedo as the Wachati princess
- Tommy Davidson as Tiny Warrior / Wachootoo prince
- Adewalé as Hitu, Security Chief of Nibia
- Damon Standifer as the Wachati chief
- Arsenio 'Sonny' Trinidad as Ashram monk / Grand abbot
- Danny D. Daniels as Wachootoo shaman
- Andrew Steel as Mick Katie
- Bruce Spence as Gahjii
- Michael Reid McKay as Skinny husband / Monopoly guy
- Kristin Norton as Pompous woman

== Production ==
=== Filming ===
Filming began under Tom DeCerchio, who later directed Celtic Pride (1996). Because of the success of the first film, Morgan Creek Entertainment Group gave lead actor Jim Carrey the power to decide the director. In April 1995, Carrey had DeCerchio replaced with Steve Oedekerk, who had worked on the film's predecessor as a script consultant and wrote the screenplay for this film, but had no previous experience with directing feature films. Spike Jonze wanted to direct the film, but Carrey turned him down as he also had no experience but he mainly did not know him well enough. Carrey claims this to be one of his biggest regrets. However, Carrey reiterated he does not regret enlisting Oedekerk to direct as they were friends with creative similarities, which included improvising, changing scenes during filming, and had a vast understanding of the main character. Carrey was sometimes absent from the set which caused the production to go behind schedule. In June 1995, scenes were shot in South Carolina. The following month, filming took place outside Hondo, near San Antonio, Texas.

Part of the film was also shot in British Columbia, Canada. The film was shot in Super 35. Carrey was paid $10 million, a third of the entire budget, for his role due to Oedekerk's authority as director.

== Music ==
=== Soundtrack ===
Ace Ventura: When Nature Calls is a 1995 soundtrack on this film by composer Robert Folk.

1. "Africa (What Made You So Strong)" - 3:28 (Johnny Clegg and Savuka)
2. "Spirits in the Material World" – 4:41 (Sting and Pato Banton)
3. "Secret Agent Man" – 2:16 (Blues Traveler)
4. "Don't Change" – 3:41 (Goo Goo Dolls)
5. "Burnin' Rubber" – 3:18 (Mr. Mirainga)
6. "Boll Weevil" – 3:17 (The Presidents of the United States of America)
7. "Blur the Technicolor" – 4:09 (White Zombie)
8. "Watusi Rodeo" – 2:35 (The Reverend Horton Heat)
9. "Here Comes the Night" – 3:28 (Native)
10. "Jungle Groove" – 5:13 (Montell Jordan)
11. "Ife" – 4:23 (Angélique Kidjo)
12. "My Pet" – 2:47 (Matthew Sweet)
13. "It's Alright" – 4:54 (Blessid Union of Souls)
14. "Ace in Africa" – 4:40 (Robert Folk)

== Release ==
=== Theatrical ===
Ace Ventura: When Nature Calls originally premiered on November 8, 1995, at the Regency Village Theatre, and was released two days later on November 10, 1995.

=== Home media ===
Ace Ventura: When Nature Calls was released on VHS on March 12, 1996, on DVD on October 28, 1997, and Blu-ray by Warner Home Video on September 3, 2013, and on April 23, 2019, by Sony Pictures Home Entertainment.

== Reception ==
=== Box office ===
The film grossed $37,804,076 during its opening weekend, debuting at No. 1. In the U.S. and Canada, the film grossed $108.3 million, and in other territories, it grossed $104 million. The worldwide gross was $212.3 million. Against its $30 million budget, Ace Ventura: When Nature Calls was a major financial success, surpassing its predecessor.

=== Critical response ===
On Rotten Tomatoes, the film has an approval rating of 23% based on 30 reviews, with an average rating of 4.1/10. The site's critical consensus reads: "Nature Calls in this Ace Ventura sequel, and it's answered by the law of diminishing returns". On Metacritic, the film received a weighted average score of 45 out of 100, based on 17 critics, indicating "mixed or average" reviews. Audiences surveyed by CinemaScore gave the film a grade B+ on scale of A to F.

=== Accolades ===
1996 ASCAP Award

- Top Box Office Films – Robert Folk (Won)

1996 American Comedy Award

- Funniest Actor in a Motion Picture (Leading Role) – Jim Carrey (Nominated)

1996 Kid's Choice Awards

- Favorite Movie – (Won)
- Favorite Movie Actor – Jim Carrey (Won)

1996 MTV Movie Awards

- Best Male Performance – Jim Carrey (Won)
- Best Comedic Performance – Jim Carrey (Won)
- Best Kiss – Jim Carrey and Sophie Okonedo (Nominated)

1996 Razzie Awards

- Worst Remake or Sequel – James G. Robinson (Nominated)

1996 Stinkers Bad Movie Awards

- Worst Picture – James G. Robinson (Nominated)
- Worst Actor – Jim Carrey (Nominated)
- Most Painfully Unfunny Comedy – James G. Robinson (Won)
- Worst Sequel – James G. Robinson (Won)
- The Sequel Nobody Was Clamoring For – James G. Robinson (Nominated)

== Sequel ==
A standalone made-for-TV sequel, titled Ace Ventura Jr.: Pet Detective, was released in 2009 to poor reception.

In March 2021, there were reports that a direct sequel under the working title Ace Ventura 3 is in development at Amazon Studios. Pat Casey and Josh Miller, writers of the Sonic the Hedgehog films (which also star Jim Carrey), were attached as writers for the film. Although there are no official plans for the film, Carrey joked that he would star in the movie if Christopher Nolan were to direct the film.
