= List of awards and nominations received by Jim Carrey =

Jim Carrey awards and nominations
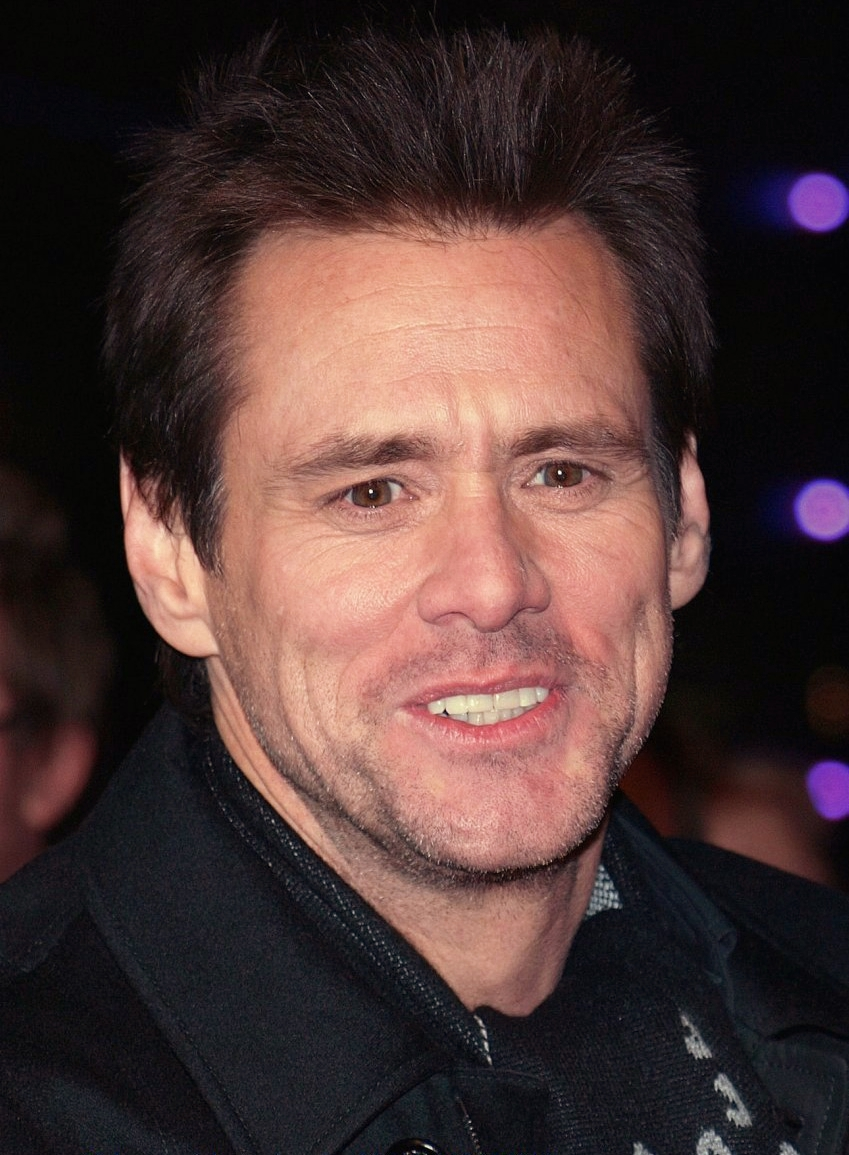
- Carrey in 2008
Awards and nominations
Award	Wins	Nominations
BAFTA Awards	0	1
Emmy Awards	0	1
Grammy Awards	0	1
Golden Globe Awards	2	7
Screen Actors Guild Awards	0	1

Totals (Note: Certain award groups do not simply award one winner. They acknowledge several different recipients, have runners-up, and have third place. Since this is a specific recognition and is different from losing an award, runner-up mentions are considered wins in this award tally. For simplification and to avoid errors, each award in this list has been presumed to have had a prior nomination.)
- Wins: 56
- Nominations: 102

Jim Carrey is a Canadian actor, comedian and producer. Over the course of career he has received various accolades including two Golden Globe Awards as well as nominations for a British Academy Film Award, an Emmy Award, a Grammy Award, and a Screen Actors Guild Award. In 2010, he was honored with the Ordre des Arts et des Lettres from the French Minister of Culture.

Carrey started his career in Canadian comedy films and the sketch comedy series In Living Color from 1990 to 1994. He gained stardom starring as Ace Ventura in the comedy films Ace Ventura: Pet Detective (1994) and Ace Ventura: When Nature Calls (1995), both earned him the Kids' Choice Award for Favorite Movie Actor. He continued his comedy stardom with The Mask (1994) and Liar Liar (1997) both of which earned him nominations for the Golden Globe Award for Best Actor in a Motion Picture – Musical or Comedy. He portrayed The Grinch in the live action Christmas fantasy film How the Grinch Stole Christmas (2000) earning another Golden Globe nomination. He also starred in the comedy films Dumb and Dumber (1994), Bruce Almighty (2003), Fun with Dick and Jane (2005), and Yes Man (2008). He has voiced roles in Horton Hears a Who! (2008) and A Christmas Carol (2009). He currently stars as Dr. Ivo "Eggman" Robotnik in the Sonic the Hedgehog franchise starting in 2020.

Carrey is also known for taking on mature roles starting first playing the title role in the psychological dramedy The Truman Show (1998) for which he won the Golden Globe Award for Best Actor in a Motion Picture – Drama. The following year he portrayed Andy Kauffman in the biographical comedy-drama Man on the Moon (1999) winning the Golden Globe Award for Best Actor in a Motion Picture – Musical or Comedy and being nominated for the Screen Actors Guild Award for Outstanding Actor in a Leading Role. He starred in the surrealist romance drama Eternal Sunshine of the Spotless Mind (2004) for which he was nominated for the BAFTA Award for Best Actor in a Leading Role and the Golden Globe Award for Best Actor in a Motion Picture – Musical or Comedy. He portrayed Steven Jay Russell in the black comedy I Love You Phillip Morris (2009).

On television, he starred in Showtime tragicomedy series Kidding (2018–2020) earning a nomination for the Golden Globe Award for Best Actor – Television Series Musical or Comedy. He also was featured in the Netflix documentary Jim & Andy: The Great Beyond (2017) which earned him a Primetime Emmy Award for Outstanding Documentary or Nonfiction Special nomination. He was nominated for the Grammy Award for Best Spoken Word Album for Children for narrating A Series of Unfortunate Events: The Bad Beginning (2006).

== Major associations ==
=== BAFTA Awards ===
Year	Category	Nominated work	Result	Ref.
British Academy Film Awards
2005	Best Actor in a Leading Role	Eternal Sunshine of the Spotless Mind	Nominated	

=== Critics' Choice Awards ===
Year	Category	Nominated work	Result	Ref.
Critics' Choice Super Awards
2021	Best Villain in a Movie	Sonic the Hedgehog	Won	
2021	Best Actor in a Superhero Movie	Sonic the Hedgehog	Nominated	

=== Emmy Awards ===
Year	Category	Nominated work	Result	Ref.
Primetime Emmy Awards
2018	Outstanding Documentary or Nonfiction Special	Jim & Andy: The Great Beyond	Nominated	

=== Golden Globe Awards ===
Year	Category	Nominated work	Result	Ref.
1995	Best Actor in a Motion Picture – Musical or Comedy	The Mask	Nominated	
1998	Best Actor in a Motion Picture – Musical or Comedy	Liar Liar	Nominated	
1999	Best Actor in a Motion Picture – Drama	The Truman Show	Won	
2000	Best Actor in a Motion Picture – Musical or Comedy	Man on the Moon	Won	
2001	Best Actor in a Motion Picture – Musical or Comedy	How the Grinch Stole Christmas	Nominated	
2005	Best Actor in a Motion Picture – Musical or Comedy	Eternal Sunshine of the Spotless Mind	Nominated	
2019	Best Actor in a Television Series – Musical or Comedy	Kidding	Nominated	

=== Grammy Awards ===
Year	Category	Nominated work	Result	Ref.
2006	Best Spoken Word Album for Children	A Series of Unfortunate Events: The Bad Beginning	Nominated	

=== Screen Actors Guild Awards ===
Year	Category	Nominated work	Result	Ref.
2000	Outstanding Actor in a Leading Role	Man on the Moon	Nominated	

== Critics awards ==
Organizations	Year	Category	Work	Result	Ref.
Awards Circuit Community Award	1998	Best Lead Actor	The Truman Show	Nominated	
Awards Circuit Community Award	1999	Best Lead Actor	Man on the Moon	Nominated	
Awards Circuit Community Award	2004	Best Lead Actor	Eternal Sunshine of the Spotless Mind	Nominated	
Awards Circuit Community Award	2004	Best Cast Ensemble	Eternal Sunshine of the Spotless Mind	Nominated	
Awards Circuit Community Award	2010	Best Lead Actor	I Love You Phillip Morris	Nominated	
Boston Society of Film Critics	1999	Best Lead Actor	Man on the Moon	Won	
Chicago Film Critics Association	1995	Most Promising Actor	The Mask / Ace Ventura: Pet Detective	Nominated	
Chicago Film Critics Association	1999	Best Actor	The Truman Show	Nominated	
Dallas–Fort Worth Film Critics Association	1999	Best Actor	The Truman Show	Won	
International Cinephile Society	2005	Best Lead Actor	Eternal Sunshine of the Spotless Mind	Won	
London Critics Circle Film	1995	Newcomer of the Year	The Mask / Ace Ventura: Pet Detective	Won	
London Critics Circle Film	2001	Actor of the Year	Man on the Moon / How the Grinch Stole Christmas	Nominated	
Online Film & Television Association	1999	Best Lead Actor	The Truman Show	Nominated	
Online Film & Television Association	1999	Best Drama Actor	The Truman Show	Nominated	
Online Film & Television Association	1999	Best Cinematic Moment (shared with Ed Harris & Natashca McElhone)	The Truman Show	Nominated	
Online Film & Television Association	2000	Best Lead Actor	Man on the Moon	Nominated	
Online Film & Television Association	2001	Best Music, Adaption Song	How the Grinch Stole Christmas	Nominated	
Online Film & Television Association	2005	Best Lead Actor	Eternal Sunshine of the Spotless Mind	Nominated	
Online Film Critics Society	2000	Best Actor	Man on the Moon	Nominated	
Online Film Critics Society	2005	Best Actor	Eternal Sunshine of the Spotless Mind	Nominated	
San Diego Film Critics Society	2004	Best Lead Actor	Eternal Sunshine of the Spotless Mind	Won	
Toronto Film Critics Association	1999	Best Performance, Male	Man on the Moon	Nominated	
Washington DC Area Film Critics Association	2004	Best Lead Actor	Eternal Sunshine of the Spotless Mind	Nominated	

== Miscellaneous awards ==
Organizations	Year	Category	Work	Result	Ref.
American Comedy Awards	1995	Funniest Lead Actor in a Motion Picture	Ace Ventura: Pet Detective	Nominated	
American Comedy Awards	1996	Funniest Lead Actor in a Motion Picture	Ace Ventura: When Nature Calls	Nominated	
American Comedy Awards	1999	Funniest Lead Actor in a Motion Picture	The Truman Show	Nominated	
American Comedy Awards	1999	Funniest Male Guest Appearance in a Television Series	The Larry Sanders Show	Nominated	
American Comedy Awards	2000	Funniest Lead Actor in a Motion Picture	Man on the Moon	Nominated	
Blockbuster Entertainment Awards	1995	Favorite Male Newcomer, On Video	Ace Ventura: Pet Detective	Won	
Blockbuster Entertainment Awards	1995	Favorite Actor - Comedy, On Video	Ace Ventura: Pet Detective	Won	
Blockbuster Entertainment Awards	1996	Favorite Actor – Comedy/Romance	Ace Ventura: When Nature Calls	Won	
Blockbuster Entertainment Awards	1998	Favorite Actor - Comedy	Liar Liar	Won	
Blockbuster Entertainment Awards	1999	Favorite Actor - Drama	The Truman Show	Nominated	
Blockbuster Entertainment Awards	2001	Favorite Actor - Comedy/Romance	Me, Myself & Irene	Nominated	
Blockbuster Entertainment Awards	2001	Favorite Actor - Comedy	How the Grinch Stole Christmas	Won	
Canadian Comedy Awards	2000	Film - Performance - Male	Man on the Moon	Nominated	
Canadian Comedy Awards	2001	Film - Pretty Funny Male Performance	How the Grinch Stole Christmas	Nominated	
CinEuphoria Awards	2011	Best Actor - International Competition	I Love You Phillip Morris	Won	
Empire awards	2001	Best Actor	How the Grinch Stole Christmas	Nominated	
Empire awards	2005	Best Actor	Eternal Sunshine of the Spotless Mind	Nominated	
Golden Raspberry Awards	1995	Worst New Star	The Mask /Ace Ventura: Pet Detective / Dumb and Dumber	Nominated	
Golden Raspberry Awards	2008	Worst Lead Actor	The Number 23	Nominated	
Golden Schmoes awards	2004	Best Actor of the Year	Eternal Sunshine of the Spotless Mind	Nominated	
Jupiter awards	2004	Best International Actor	Eternal Sunshine of the Spotless Mind	Nominated	
MTV Movie & TV Awards	1994	Best Comedic Performance	Ace Ventura: Pet Detective	Nominated	
MTV Movie & TV Awards	1995	Best Comedic Performance	The Mask	Nominated	
MTV Movie & TV Awards	1995	Best Dance Sequence (shared with Cameron Diaz)	The Mask	Nominated	
MTV Movie & TV Awards	1995	Best Comedic Performance	Dumb and Dumber	Won	
MTV Movie & TV Awards	1995	Best On-Screen Duo (shared with Jeff Daniels)	Dumb and Dumber	Nominated	
MTV Movie & TV Awards	1995	Best Kiss (shared with Lauren Holly)	Dumb and Dumber	Won	
MTV Movie & TV Awards	1996	Best Male Performance	Ace Ventura: When Nature Calls	Won	
MTV Movie & TV Awards	1996	Best Comedic Performance	Ace Ventura: When Nature Calls	Won	
MTV Movie & TV Awards	1996	Best Kiss (shared with Sophie Okonedo)	Ace Ventura: When Nature Calls	Nominated	
MTV Movie & TV Awards	1996	Best Villain	Batman Forever	Nominated	
MTV Movie & TV Awards	1997	Best Comedic Performance	The Cable Guy	Won	
MTV Movie & TV Awards	1997	Best Villain	The Cable Guy	Won	
MTV Movie & TV Awards	1997	Best Fight (shared with Matthew Broderick)	The Cable Guy	Nominated	
MTV Movie & TV Awards	1998	Best Comedic Performance	Liar Liar	Won	
MTV Movie & TV Awards	1999	Best Male Performance	The Truman Show	Won	
MTV Movie & TV Awards	2000	Best Male Performance	Man on the Moon	Nominated	
MTV Movie & TV Awards	2001	Best Comedic Performance	Me, Myself & Irene	Nominated	
MTV Movie & TV Awards	2001	Best Villain	How the Grinch Stole Christmas	Won	
MTV Movie & TV Awards	2004	Best Comedic Performance	Bruce Almighty	Nominated	
MTV Movie & TV Awards	2004	Best Kiss (shared with Jennifer Aniston)	Bruce Almighty	Nominated	
MTV Movie & TV Awards	2005	Best Villain	A Series of Unfortunate Events	Nominated	
MTV Movie & TV Awards	2006	MTV Generation Award	Jim Carrey	Won	
MTV Movie & TV Awards	2009	Best Comedic Performance	Yes Man	Won	
MTV Movie & TV Awards	2014	Best Fight	Anchorman 2: The Legend Continues	Nominated	
MTV Movie Awards, Mexico	2004	Most Divine Miracle in a Movie	Bruce Almighty	Won	
MTV Video Music Awards	1995	Best Video from a Film	"Jim Carrey: Cuban Pete" (from The Mask)	Nominated	
Nickelodeon Kids' Choice Awards	1995	Favorite Movie Actor	Ace Ventura: Pet Detective	Won	
Nickelodeon Kids' Choice Awards	1996	Favorite Movie Actor	Ace Ventura: When Nature Calls / Batman Forever	Won	
Nickelodeon Kids' Choice Awards	1997	Favorite Movie Actor	The Cable Guy	Won	
Nickelodeon Kids' Choice Awards	1998	Favorite Movie Actor	Liar Liar	Nominated	
Nickelodeon Kids' Choice Awards	1999	Favorite Movie Actor	The Truman Show	Nominated	
Nickelodeon Kids' Choice Awards	2001	Favorite Movie Actor	How the Grinch Stole Christmas	Won	
Nickelodeon Kids' Choice Awards	2004	Favorite Movie Actor	Bruce Almighty	Won	
Nickelodeon Kids' Choice Awards	2005	Favorite Movie Actor	A Series of Unfortunate Events	Nominated	
Nickelodeon Kids' Choice Awards	2006	Favorite Movie Actor	Fun with Dick and Jane	Nominated	
Nickelodeon Kids' Choice Awards	2009	Favorite Movie Actor	Yes Man	Nominated	
Nickelodeon Kids' Choice Awards	2009	Favorite Voice from an Animated Movie	Horton Hears a Who!	Nominated	
Nickelodeon Kids' Choice Awards	2010	Favorite Voice from an Animated Movie	A Christmas Carol	Won	
Nickelodeon Kids' Choice Awards	2012	Favorite Movie Actor	Mr. Popper's Penguins	Nominated	
Nickelodeon Kids' Choice Awards	2021	Favorite Movie Actor	Sonic the Hedgehog	Nominated	
Nickelodeon Kids' Choice Awards	2023	Favorite Movie Actor	Sonic the Hedgehog 2	Nominated	
Nickelodeon Kids' Choice Awards	2025	Favorite Movie Actor	Sonic the Hedgehog 3	Nominated	
Nickelodeon Kids' Choice Awards	2025	Favorite Villain	Sonic the Hedgehog 3	Won	
People's Choice Awards	1996	Favorite Actor in a Comedy Motion Picture	Ace Ventura: When Nature Calls	Won	
People's Choice Awards	2001	Favorite Motion Picture Star in a Comedy	How the Grinch Stole Christmas	Won	
People's Choice Awards	2005	Favorite Leading Man	Jim Carrey	Nominated	
People's Choice Awards	2005	Favorite Funny Male Star	Jim Carrey	Won	
People's Choice Awards	2005	Favorite On-Screen Chemistry (shared with Kate Winslet)	Eternal Sunshine of the Spotless Mind	Nominated	
People's Choice Awards	2009	Favorite Funny Male Star	Jim Carrey	Nominated	
People's Choice Awards	2010	Favorite Comedy Star	Jim Carrey	Won	
People's Choice Awards	2012	Favorite Television Guest Star	The Office	Nominated	
Russian National Movie Awards	2005	Best Foreign Actor of the Year	Eternal Sunshine of the Spotless Mind	Nominated	
Russian National Movie Awards	2014	Best Foreign Actor of the Decade	Jim Carrey	Nominated	
Satellite Awards	2000	Best Actor – Motion Picture (Comedy or Musical)	Man on the Moon	Nominated	
Satellite Awards	2005	Best Actor – Motion Picture (Comedy or Musical)	Eternal Sunshine of the Spotless Mind	Nominated	
Saturn Awards	1999	Best Lead Actor	The Truman Show	Nominated	
Saturn Awards	2001	Best Lead Actor	How the Grinch Stole Christmas	Nominated	
Saturn Awards	2005	Best Lead Actor	Eternal Sunshine of the Spotless Mind	Nominated	
ShoWest Convention Awards	1995	Comedy Star of the Year	Jim Carrey	Won	
ShoWest Convention Awards	2000	Male Star of the Year	Jim Carrey	Won	
The Stinkers Bad Movie Awards	1995	Worst Lead Actor	Ace Ventura: When Nature Calls	Nominated	
The Stinkers Bad Movie Awards	2005	Worst On-Screen Couple (shared with Tea Leoni)	Fun with Dick and Jane	Nominated	
Teen Choice Awards	2000	Choice Movie - Wipeout Scene of the Summer	Me, Myself & Irene	Won	
Teen Choice Awards	2001	Choice Movie - Hissy Fit	How the Grinch Stole Christmas	Won	
Teen Choice Awards	2003	Choice Movie Actor - Comedy	Bruce Almighty	Won	
Teen Choice Awards	2003	Choice Movie - Chemistry (shared with Morgan Freeman)	Bruce Almighty	Nominated	
Teen Choice Awards	2003	Choice - Comedian	Jim Carrey	Won	
Teen Choice Awards	2004	Choice - Comedian	Jim Carrey	Nominated	
Teen Choice Awards	2005	Choice Movie Actor - Action/Adventure-Thriller	A Series of Unfortunate Events	Nominated	
Teen Choice Awards	2005	Choice Movie - Liar	A Series of Unfortunate Events	Nominated	
Teen Choice Awards	2005	Choice Movie - Bad Guy	A Series of Unfortunate Events	Won	
Teen Choice Awards	2005	Choice - Comedian	Jim Carrey	Nominated	
Teen Choice Awards	2006	Choice Movie Actor - Comedy	Fun with Dick and Jane	Nominated	
Teen Choice Awards	2006	Choice - Comedian	Jim Carrey	Nominated	
Teen Choice Awards	2007	Choice Movie Actor - Horror/Thriller	The Number 23	Nominated	
Teen Choice Awards	2009	Choice Movie Actor - Comedy	Yes Man	Nominated	
Teen Choice Awards	2009	Choice Movie - Hissy Fit	Yes Man	Nominated	
Teen Choice Awards	2009	Choice Movie - Rockstar Moment	Yes Man	Nominated	
Teen Choice Awards	2015	Choice Movie Actor - Comedy	Dumb and Dumber To	Nominated	
Teen Choice Awards	2015	Choice Movie - Chemistry (shared with Jeff Daniels)	Dumb and Dumber To	Nominated	
TV Land Awards	2004	Big Star/Little Screen Favorite	In Living Color	Nominated	
TV Land Awards	2012	Groundbreaking Show	In Living Color	Won	
Village Voice Film Poll	2010	Best Lead Actor	I Love You Phillip Morris	Nominated	
The Webby Awards	2011	Best Individual Performance	Presidential Reunion	Won	

== Honorary awards ==
Organizations	Year	Award	Result	Ref.
Canada Walk of Fame	2004	Star on the Canadian Walk of Fame	Honored	
US Comedy Arts Festival	2005	AFI Star Award	Honored	
French Minister of Culture	2010	Ordre des Arts et des Lettres	Honored	
César Awards	2026	Honorary César	Honored	

== See also ==
- Jim Carrey
- Jim Carrey filmography
