= Jim Carrey filmography =

Actor filmography

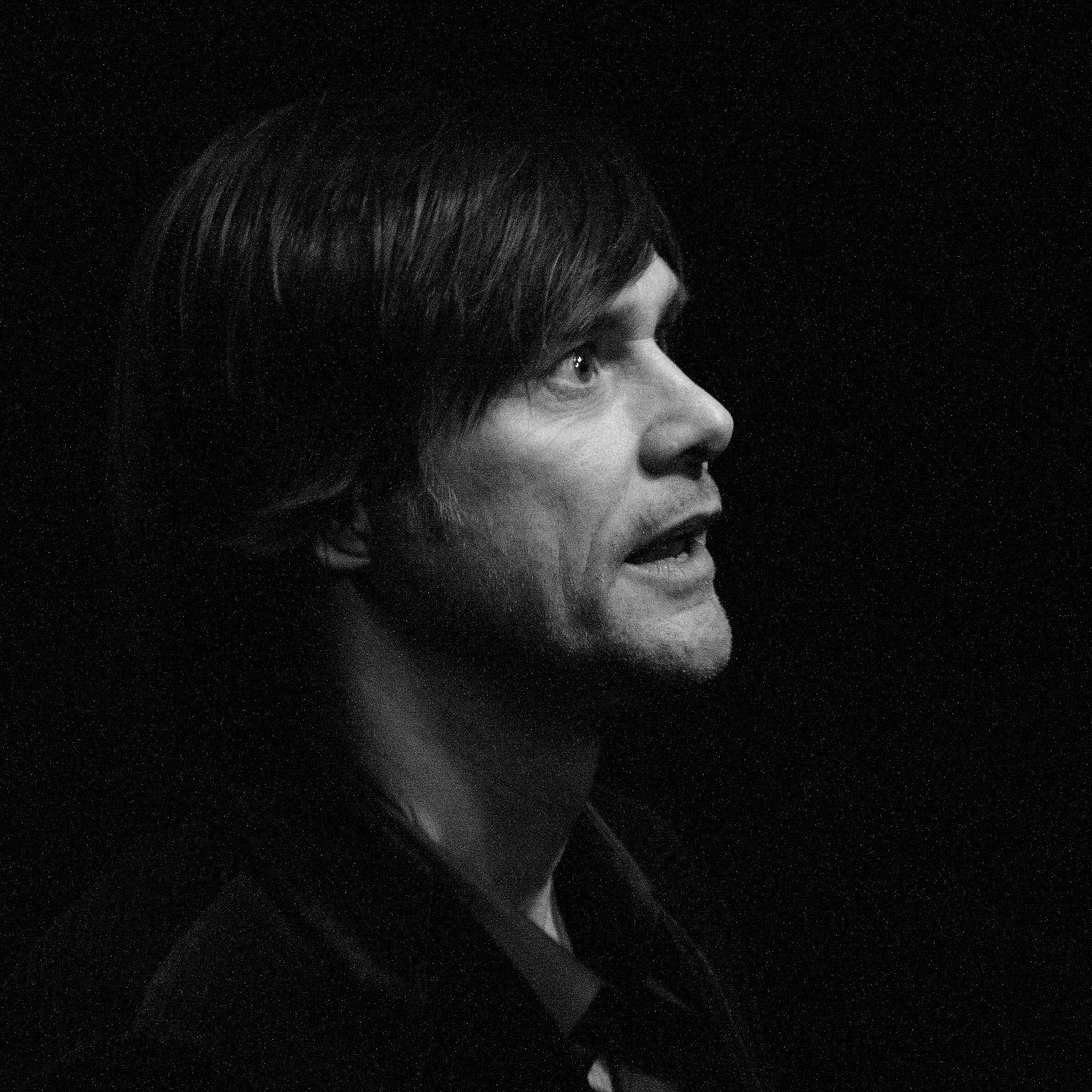
- Carrey in 2011
- Film: 44
- Television: 20
- Documentary: 19
- Music videos: 3
- Advertising: 1
- Others: 1 video game, 1 web

Jim Carrey is a Canadian-American actor and comedian who has appeared in various feature films, television films/series, along with one video game appearance. He is one of the top-50 highest-grossing actors of all time at the North American box office, with over $2.5 billion total gross and an average of $94.3 million per film. He has been involved with thirteen films that grossed over $250 million at the worldwide box office; the highest-grossing film being Sonic the Hedgehog 3. Carrey gained his first lead role on the short-lived television series The Duck Factory in 1984, playing a young cartoonist. His first starring role in film was the 1985 comedy horror Once Bitten, with Lauren Hutton as a vampire countess and Carrey playing her victim. He landed supporting roles in films, such as Peggy Sue Got Married (1986), The Dead Pool (1988) and Earth Girls Are Easy (also 1988). In 1990, Carrey received his commercial breakthrough on Fox's In Living Color (1990–1994), where he displayed his character work.

In 1994, Carrey's breakthrough came when he landed the leading role in Ace Ventura: Pet Detective, in which he played a goof-ball detective specialized in crimes involving animals. The film would go on to earn over $72 million at the box office. He went on to star in the sequel Ace Ventura: When Nature Calls in 1995. In 1994, he starred in two commercial successes: The Mask with Cameron Diaz, and Dumb and Dumber with Jeff Daniels. The films ended up grossing $120 million and $127 million, respectively, and established Carrey as a star. Other 1990s films he starred in included Batman Forever (1995), The Cable Guy (1996) and Liar Liar (1997).

In 1998, he gained critical acclaim in the satirical comedy-drama film The Truman Show, in which he played Truman Burbank, a man whose life was, unbeknownst to him, a top-rating reality television show. The film was highly praised and led many to believe he would be nominated for an Oscar, but instead he picked up his first Golden Globe Award for Best Actor in a Motion Picture Drama. In 2000, he returned to comedy reteaming with the Farrelly brothers for Me, Myself & Irene; it received mixed reviews but enjoyed box office success. That same year, Carrey also appeared in How the Grinch Stole Christmas.

Carrey starred opposite Jennifer Aniston and Morgan Freeman in Tom Shadyac's 2003 comedy Bruce Almighty, portraying a television newsman who unexpectedly receives God's omnipotent abilities. It remained his most financially successful film until Sonic the Hedgehog 3 in 2024. In 2004, he took a role in the critically lauded art-house film Eternal Sunshine of the Spotless Mind, written by Charlie Kaufman and directed by Michel Gondry. He received his fourth Golden Globe Award nomination, and was also nominated for his first BAFTA Award for Best Actor in a Leading Role. In the 2010s and 2020s, he played Sal Bertolinni / Colonel Stars and Stripes in the black comedy superhero film Kick-Ass 2 (2013), Lloyd Christmas in Dumb and Dumber To (2014), and the villainous scientist Dr. Ivo "Eggman" Robotnik in Sonic the Hedgehog (2020) and its three sequels in 2022, 2024 and 2027.

== Film ==
Key
†	Denotes films that have not yet been released

Year	Title	Role	Notes	Ref.
1983	The Sex and Violence Family Hour	Host, various roles	Direct-to-video; also wrote additional material	
1983	All in Good Taste	Ralph Parker	Silent and minor role	
1984	Finders Keepers	Lane Biddlecoff		
1985	Once Bitten	Mark Kendall		
1986	Peggy Sue Got Married	Walter Getz		
1988	The Dead Pool	Johnny Squares	Credited as James Carrey	
1988	Earth Girls Are Easy	Wiploc		
1989	Pink Cadillac	Lounge Entertainer		
1991	High Strung	Death	Uncredited	
1992	Itsy Bitsy Spider	The Exterminator	Voice; short film	
1994	Ace Ventura: Pet Detective	Ace Ventura	Also co-screenwriter	
1994	The Mask	Stanley Ipkiss / The Mask		
1994	Dumb and Dumber	Lloyd Christmas		
1995	Batman Forever	Edward Nygma / The Riddler		
1995	Ace Ventura: When Nature Calls	Ace Ventura		
1996	The Cable Guy	Cable Guy / Ernie "Chip" Douglas		
1997	Liar Liar	Fletcher Reede, Fire Marshall Bill	Brief uncredited cameo as Fire Marshall Bill from In Living Color	
1998	The Truman Show	Truman Burbank		
1998	Simon Birch	Adult Joe Wenteworth / Narrator		
1999	Man on the Moon	Andy Kaufman / Tony Clifton		
2000	Me, Myself & Irene	Charlie Baileygates / Hank Evans		
2000	How the Grinch Stole Christmas	The Grinch		
2001	The Majestic	Peter Appleton		
2003	Bruce Almighty	Bruce Nolan	Also producer	
2003	Pecan Pie	The Driver	Short film	
2004	Eternal Sunshine of the Spotless Mind	Joel Barish		
2004	A Series of Unfortunate Events	Count Olaf		
2005	Fun with Dick and Jane	Richard "Dick" Harper	Also producer	
2007	The Number 23	Walter Sparrow / Detective Fingerling		
2008	Horton Hears a Who!	Horton the Elephant	Voice	
2008	Yes Man	Carl Allen		
2009	I Love You Phillip Morris	Steven Jay Russell		
2009	A Christmas Carol	Ebenezer Scrooge, Ghosts of Christmas: Past, Present, Yet to Come	Voice and motion-capture	
2011	Mr. Popper's Penguins	Thomas "Tom" Popper Jr.		
2013	The Incredible Burt Wonderstone	Steve Gray		
2013	Kick-Ass 2	Sal Bertolinni / Colonel Stars and Stripes		
2013	Anchorman 2: The Legend Continues	Scott Riles	Uncredited cameo	
2014	Dumb and Dumber To	Lloyd Christmas		
2016	The Bad Batch	The Hermit		
2016	Dark Crimes	Tadek		
2020	Sonic the Hedgehog	Dr. Ivo "Eggman" Robotnik		
2022	Sonic the Hedgehog 2	Dr. Ivo "Eggman" Robotnik		
2024	Sonic the Hedgehog 3	Dr. Ivo "Eggman" Robotnik, Professor Gerald Robotnik	Also artistic consultant	
2027	Sonic the Hedgehog 4 †	Dr. Ivo "Eggman" Robotnik	Post-production	

== Television ==
Year	Title	Role	Notes	Ref.
1980	The All-Night Show	Additional voices		
1981	Rubberface	Tony Moroni	Television film	
1983	Copper Mountain	Bobby Todd	Television film	
1984	Buffalo Bill	Jerry Lewis Impersonator	Episode: "Jerry Lewis Week"	
1984	The Duck Factory	Skip Tarkenton	13 episodes	
1989	Mike Hammer: Murder Takes All	Brad Peters	Television film	
1990–1994	In Living Color	Fire Marshall Bill, various roles	125 episodes; credited as James Carrey	
1991	Jim Carrey: The Un-Natural Act	Himself	Stand-up special; also producer and writer	
1992	Doing Time on Maple Drive	Tim Carter	Television film	
1992	Sesame Street	Himself	Episode: "3023"	
1996, 2011, 2014	Saturday Night Live	Himself	Host; 3 episodes	
1998	The Larry Sanders Show	Himself	Episode: "Flip"	
2011	The Office	The FingerLakes Guy	Episode: "Search Committee"	
2011	Drunk History	Santa Claus	Episode: "Drunk History Christmas"	
2012	30 Rock	Dave Williams	Episode: "Leap Day"	
2015	Saturday Night Live 40th Anniversary Special	Himself / Matthew McConaughey	Television special	
2017–2018	I'm Dying Up Here	—N/a	Executive producer only	
2018–2020	Kidding	Jeff Piccirillo / Jeff Pickles	20 episodes; also executive producer	
2020	Saturday Night Live	Joe Biden	6 episodes	
2022	The Dawn FM Experience	Dawn FM Disc-jockey	Voice; television music special	

== Documentary ==
Year	Title	Role	Notes	Ref.
1994	Masters of Illusion: The Wizards of Special Effects	Himself		
1995	A Comedy Salute to Andy Kaufman	Himself		
1995	Jim Carrey Spotlight	Himself		
1998	Junket Whore	Himself		
1998	In My Life	Himself		
1999	Pesel Ha'Zahav	Himself		
1999	AFI's 100 Years...100 Stars: America's Greatest Screen Legends	Himself		
2000	Jim Carrey Uncensored	Himself		
2001	America: A Tribute to Heroes	Himself		
2001	The Concert for New York City	Himself		
2009	Under the Sea 3D	Narrator		
2011	Conan O'Brien Can't Stop	Narrator		
2011	The Love We Make	Narrator		
2015	Rubble Kings	—N/a	Producer only	
2017	Jim & Andy: The Great Beyond	Himself		
2017	Jim Carrey: I Needed Color	Himself		
2018	The Zen Diaries of Garry Shandling	Himself		
2020	The Comedy Store	Himself		
2025	Starring Dick Van Dyke	Himself		

== Music videos ==
Year	Artist	Song	Role	Notes	Ref.
1994	Tone Loc	"Ace Is in the House"	Ace Ventura		
2013	Jim Carrey	"Cold Dead Hand"	Charlton Heston, Lonesome Earl, Sam Elliott	Also songwriter	
2022	The Weeknd	"Out of Time"	Doctor	Cameo	

== Commercial ==
Year	Title	Role	Ref.
2022	Verizon	Cable Guy / Ernie "Chip" Douglas	

== Video game ==
Year	Title	Voice role	Ref.
2004	Lemony Snicket's A Series of Unfortunate Events	Count Olaf	

== Web ==
Year	Title	Role	Ref.
2010	Presidential Reunion	Ronald Reagan	

== Bibliography ==
- "Jim Carrey — Overview > Biography / Filmography > Awards". AllMovie. AllRovi.
- "Jim Carrey — Biography > Highest Rated Movies > Filmography". Rotten Tomatoes. Flixster.
- "Jim Carrey — Famous Works". Film Reference. Advameg.
