= List of 2003 box office number-one films in Canada =

This is a list of films which have placed number one at the weekend box office in Canada during 2003.

== Weekend gross list ==
†	This implies the highest-grossing movie of the year.

#	Weekend End Date	Film	Weekend Gross (millions)	Notes
1	January 6, 2003	The Lord of the Rings: The Two Towers	$3.84	
2	January 12, 2003	The Lord of the Rings: The Two Towers	$2.50	Just Married was #1 in America.
3	January 19, 2003	The Lord of the Rings: The Two Towers	$1.80	Kangaroo Jack was #1 in America.
4	January 26, 2003	The Lord of the Rings: The Two Towers	$1.08	Darkness Falls was #1 in America.
5	February 2, 2003	The Recruit	$1.43	
6	February 9, 2003	How to Lose a Guy in 10 Days	$2.86	
7	February 16, 2003	Daredevil	$3.17	
8	February 23, 2003	Daredevil	$1.33	
9	March 2, 2003	Cradle 2 the Grave	$1.28	
10	March 9, 2003	Tears of the Sun	$1.61	Bringing Down the House was #1 in America.
11	March 16, 2003	Agent Cody Banks	$1.52	Bringing Down the House was #1 in America.
12	March 23, 2003	Dreamcatcher	$1.29	Bringing Down the House was #1 in America.
13	March 30, 2003	Basic	$1.24	Head of State was #1 in America.
14	April 6, 2003	Phone Booth	$1.69	
15	April 13, 2003	Anger Management	$3.44	
16	April 20, 2003	Anger Management	$2.60	
17	April 27, 2003	Anger Management	$1.52	Identity was #1 in America.
18	May 4, 2003	X2: X-Men United	$7.82	
19	May 11, 2003	X2: X-Men United	$3.60	
20	May 18, 2003	The Matrix Reloaded	$8.83	The Matrix Reloaded had the highest weekend debut of 2003.
21	May 25, 2003	Bruce Almighty	$4.92	
22	June 1, 2003	Finding Nemo †	$3.72	
23	June 8, 2003	2 Fast 2 Furious	$3.53	
24	June 15, 2003	Finding Nemo †	$2.12	Finding Nemo reclaimed #1 in its third weekend of release.
25	June 22, 2003	Hulk	$4.01	
26	June 29, 2003	Charlie's Angels: Full Throttle	$3.59	
27	July 6, 2003	Terminator 3: Rise of the Machines	$3.61	
28	July 13, 2003	Pirates of the Caribbean: The Curse of the Black Pearl	$3.66	
29	July 20, 2003	Bad Boys II	$2.65	
30	July 27, 2003	Lara Croft Tomb Raider: The Cradle of Life	$2.29	Spy Kids 3-D: Game Over was #1 in America.
31	August 3, 2003	American Wedding	$3.11	
32	August 10, 2003	S.W.A.T.	$3.11	
33	August 17, 2003	S.W.A.T.	$1.48	Freddy vs. Jason was #1 in America.
34	August 24, 2003	S.W.A.T.	$1.17	Freddy vs. Jason was #1 in America.
35	August 31, 2003	S.W.A.T.	$1.16	Jeepers Creepers 2 was #1 in America.
36	September 7, 2003	Pirates of the Caribbean: The Curse of the Black Pearl	$0.68	Pirates of the Caribbean: The Curse of the Black Pearl reclaimed #1 in its ninth weekend of release. Dickie Roberts: Former Child Star was #1 in America.
37	September 14, 2003	Once Upon a Time in Mexico	$2.25	
38	September 21, 2003	Underworld	$2.10	
39	September 28, 2003	The Rundown	$1.65	
40	October 5, 2003	School of Rock	$1.50	
41	October 12, 2003	Kill Bill: Volume 1	$2.24	
42	October 19, 2003	The Texas Chainsaw Massacre	$1.62	
43	October 26, 2003	Scary Movie 3	$3.66	
44	November 2, 2003	Scary Movie 3	$1.65	
45	November 9, 2003	The Matrix Revolutions	$5.83	
46	November 16, 2003	Master and Commander: The Far Side of the World	$2.07	Elf was #1 in America.
47	November 23, 2003	The Cat in the Hat	$2.68	
48	November 30, 2003	The Cat in the Hat	$1.59	
49	December 7, 2003	The Last Samurai	$2.54	
50	December 14, 2003	The Last Samurai	$1.55	Something's Gotta Give was #1 in America.
51	December 21, 2003	The Lord of the Rings: The Return of the King	$8.41	
52	December 28, 2003	The Lord of the Rings: The Return of the King	$6.80	

== See also ==
- List of American films — American films by year
