= MTV Movie Awards Mexico 2004 =

The MTV Movie Awards Mexico 2004 was hosted by Ilana Sod.

== Winners and nominees ==
=== Favorite Movie ===
- Asesino en Serio
- Corazón de Melón
- Ladies' Night
- Nicotina
- Sin ton ni Sonia

=== Favorite Actress ===
- Ana de la Reguera as Ana - Ladies' Night
- Cecilia Suárez as Renée - Sin Ton Ni Sonia
- Ludwika Paleta as Fernanda - Corazón De Melón

=== Favorite Actor ===
- Diego Luna as Lolo - Nicotina
- José María Yazpik as Mauricio - Sin Ton Ni Sonia
- Luis Roberto Guzmán as Roco - Ladies' Night

=== Best Song from a Movie ===
- "Luz Azul (Fase Mix A)" — Aterciopelados (Nicotina)
- "Desde Que Llegaste" — Reyli (Ladies' Night)
- "Sonia" — Panteón Rococó (Sin ton ni Sonia)

=== Hottest Scene ===
- The Cyber Voyeurism of Diego Luna - Nicotina
- Mega Orgasm of Ivonne Montero - Asesino en Serio
- Table Dance of Ana Claudia Talancón and Ana de la Reguera - Ladies' Night

=== Best Diego Luna in a Movie ===
- As Button - Open Range
- As Gastón - Soldados de Salamina
- As Lolo - Nicotina

=== Worst Smoker ===
- Tomás (Daniel Martínez) - Corazón de Melón
- Lolo (Diego Luna) - Nicotina
- Orlando (Juan Manuel Bernal) - Sin ton ni Sonia

=== Best Cameo ===
- Darío T. Pié as Transvestite - Asesino en Serio
- Jesús Ochoa as Churchman - Ladies' Night
- José María Yazpik as Joaquín the Neighbor - Nicotina

=== Sexiest Hero ===
- Ben Affleck as Matt Murdock - Daredevil
- Keanu Reeves as Neo - The Matrix Reloaded
- Orlando Bloom as Will Turner - Pirates of the Caribbean: The Curse of the Black Pearl

=== Sexiest Villain ===
- Demi Moore as Madison Lee - Charlie's Angels: Full Throttle
- Kristanna Loken as TX - Terminator 3: Rise of the Machines
- Rebecca Romijn-Stamos as Mysthique - X2: X-Men United

=== Best Cinematography in a Video Scandal ===
- René Bejarano or "Don't Close Me the Briefcase"
- El niño verde or "Me Chamaquearon"
- Gustavo Ponce or "Viva Las Vegas"

=== Best Colin Farrell in a Movie ===
- as Bullseye - Daredevil
- as James - The Recruit
- as Jim - S.W.A.T.
- as Stu - Phonebooth
- as Extra - Verónica Guerin

=== Best Miracle in a Movie ===
- The ear of Maleo (Jesus heals the ear cut off by Peter) - The Passion of the Christ (James Caviezel)
- The wine at Caná (Jesus turns water into wine at a wedding) - The Last Temptation of Christ (Willem Dafoe)
- The bust of Grace (Bruce makes the breasts bigger of his wife) - Bruce Almighty (Jim Carrey)

=== Best Look ===
- Cameron Díaz as Natalie Cook - Charlie's Angels: Full Throttle
- Reese Witherspoon as Elle Wood - Legally Blonde 2
- Johnny Depp as Jack Sparrow - Pirates of the Caribbean: The Curse of the Black Pearl

=== Most Funniest "Gringo" in Japan ===
- Bill Murray as Bob Harris - Lost in Translation
- Tom Cruise as Nathan Algren - The Last Samurai
- Uma Thurman as Black Mamba - Kill Bill: Volume 1

== Legend Award ==
- Rosa Gloria Chagoyán
