= Chas Lawther =

Canadian actor

Charles "Chas" Lawther is a British-born Canadian actor, comedian and writer.

Lawther came to local prominence in Toronto when in the 1980s he created the character of Chuck The Security Guard for CFMT-TV's The All-Night Show, on the ostensible premise that as the station's night security he would be allowed to use the broadcast facilities to play classic television shows, short films and music videos between sign-off and 6 a.m. The show aired six nights a week, and featured Chuck and his late-night compatriots performing sketches, taking calls from the audience, overseeing various contests, and playing various TV shows and video clips four to five hours a night. Lawther was one of the writers of the show, as well as its star.

Later, Lawther and his comedy partner Suzette Couture formed the comedy duo Joined at the Hip, regularly playing comedy venues across Canada and at one point getting their own special on CBC. Lawther has written and hosted several comedy "stand-up mockumentaries" on CBC Radio.

He also wrote episodes for television shows including Bob and Margaret, The Raccoons and The All-Night Show and the direct to video film The Sex and Violence Family Hour. He also created a television movie documentary film called Is It Arf? in which he hosted and starred with his wife Gail Kerbel.

Many know him for his role hosting "The Showcase Revue" after the Showcase channel launched in Canada in the early 1990s.

Lawther is still a working actor, and was a recurring character as a seemingly gormless television executive on CBC's Made in Canada.

== Filmography ==
- 1966: Blowup – Waiter (uncredited)
- 1979: Matt and Jenny – Friar
- 1980–1981: The All-Night Show (CFMT-TV, TV series host) – Chuck the Security Guard
- 1982: Chuck's Choice Cuts (straight to video special produced for Admit One Video) – Chuck the Security Guard
- 1983: The Littlest Hobo – Drugue / Proust / Mr. Proust / Murphy
- 1985: Terminal Choice – Kingsley's Son-in-law
- 1986: Mafia Princess – Make-up Artist
- 1986: Police Academy 3: Back in Training – Mr. Delaney
- 1987: Ford: The Man and the Machine – Connors
- 1988: Friday the 13th: The Series – Phil / Bernie Bell
- 1989: Champagne Charlie (TV movie) – David McLeod
- 1989: George's Island – Blinky
- 1990: Dracula: The Series – Lane Zorro
- 1991: Street Legal – Ed Hollis
- 1992: The Shower – Wayne
- 1993: Shining Time Station – Ringmaster
- 1993: E.N.G. – Philpott
- 1994: The Ref – Santa Family #2
- 1994: Paint Cans – Wick Burns
- 1994: The Mighty Jungle – Brill
- 1995: Almost Golden: The Jessica Savitch Story (TV movie) – Arnie
- 1995: Iron Eagle IV – Col. Birkett
- 1995: Kung Fu: The Legend Continues
- 1996: F/X: The Series – Konich
- 1997: Lexx: The Dark Zone Stories (TV series regular) – Video Customs Officer
- 1997: Good Will Hunting – M.I.T. Professor
- 1998: Elimination Dance
- 1998: Made in Canada – Brian
- 1998: La Femme Nikita – Gufeld
- 1999: Power Play – Harrison Boulder
- 1999: Love Letters (TV movie) – Harry
- 2000: Urban Legends: Final Cut – Dean Patterson
- 2000: The Secret Adventures of Jules Verne – Dr. Cordoba
- 2002: Puppets Who Kill – Dr. Lester / Chester the Great
- 2003: Slings and Arrows – Mr. Stewart
- 2004: Zixx: Level One
- 2004: Wonderfalls – Pastor
- 2004: This is Wonderland
- 2007: Is It Art? (CBC Television) – Himself - Host
- 2007: Full of It – Mr. Von Der Ahe
- 2008: The Border – Bennett Barden
- 2009: Little Mosque on the Prairie – Rivertree's Father
- In development: Things That Intimidate Me (TVOntario)
