= Toronto Film Critics Association Awards 1999 =

Annual Canadian film awards ceremony

3rd TFCA Awards

16 December 1999

Best Film:
Magnolia

The 3rd Toronto Film Critics Association Awards, honoring the best in film for 1999, were held on 16 December 1999.

== Winners ==
- Best Actor:
  - Kevin Spacey – American Beauty

Runner-Up: Jim Carrey – Man on the Moon

- Best Actress:
  - Hilary Swank – Boys Don't Cry

Runner-Up: Cecilia Roth – All About My Mother

- Best Canadian Film:
  - Set Me Fre

Runner-Up: Felicia's Journey

- Best Director:
  - Paul Thomas Anderson – Magnolia

Runners-Up: Sam Mendes – American Beauty and Steven Soderbergh – The Limey

- Best Film:
  - Magnolia

Runner-Up: Being John Malkovich

- Best Screenplay (tie):
  - Being John Malkovich – Charlie Kaufman
  - Magnolia – Paul Thomas Anderson

Runner-Up: American Beauty – Alan Ball

- Clyde Gilmour Award:
  - Elwy Yost
