= Memoirs and Misinformation =

Novel by Jim Carrey and Dana Vachon

- Author: Jim Carrey; Dana Vachon
- Audio read by: Jeff Daniels
- Cover artist: Chip Kidd
- Language: English
- Genre: Memoir; satire
- Publisher: Alfred A. Knopf
- Publication date: July 20, 2020
- Pages: 272
- ISBN: 0525655972
- OCLC: 1160206599
- Dewey Decimal: FIC CAR
- LC Class: 2019954114

Memoirs and Misinformation is a 2020 novel by Canadian-American actor Jim Carrey and novelist Dana Vachon, starring a fictionalized version of Carrey and containing elements of autobiography. The book has received critical acclaim.

== Writing and release ==
Carrey and Vachon met at an art studio and started collaborating via Twitter a decade prior to the book's release and the origins of their collaboration went back eight years that eventually incorporated several disparate interests such as Arthurian legend and the nature of reality into a satirical memoir. Additionally, the book is an outgrowth of Carrey's interest in the artifice of celebrity and the nature of the self, which developed after his own rise to fame. The novel was announced in October 2019 and after being slated for a May 2020 release, the book was pushed back to July due to the COVID-19 pandemic.

The audio book version is narrated by Carrey's Dumb and Dumber co-star Jeff Daniels.

== Reception ==
=== Critical reception ===
Kirkus Reviews praised the book for its absurdist comedy.

=== Sales ===
The book was a New York Times Bestseller. Sales peaked at 87 on the USA Today Best-Selling Books.
