= The All-Night Show =

- Genre: Variety; Comedy; Humor; Talk
- Created by: Jeff Silverman
- Written by: Errol Bruce, Chas Lawther, Michael Lennick, Jeff Silverman
- Starring: Chas Lawther; Errol Bruce; Michael Lennick; Paul Goldberg; Suzette Couture; Maurice LaMarche; Jim Carrey
- Country of origin: Canada
- No. of seasons: 1
- No. of episodes: 300 (approx.)

Production
- Executive producer: Jeff Silverman
- Production locations: CFMT studios Toronto, Canada
- Running time: 4-5 hours

Original release
- Network: CFMT-TV
- Release: September 19, 1980 – August 29, 1981

The All-Night Show is a variety/comedy television series starring Chas Lawther as a friendly security guard who hosts his very own overnight show featuring a mixture of old television series, new sketches and interviews, musical guests, and off-beat clips. It was created and produced by Jeff Silverman and ran from September 19, 1980, to August 29, 1981 on CFMT-TV in Toronto. The show was written by Errol Bruce, Chas Lawther, Michael Lennick and Jeff Silverman.

During its run, The All Night Show ran Mondays through Saturdays, running from the end of other programming (typically 2 am, but 1 am on Saturdays) until 6 am. It featured early voice work by Maurice LaMarche and Jim Carrey, both at the very start of their careers.

== Premise ==
The premise was that Lawther's character, Chuck the Security Guard, was the overnight security guard for CFMT (which at that time was branding itself as "MTV", prior to the introduction of the American music channel MTV). With very little to do on the overnight shift, every night Chuck -- with the help of his friends Ryerson and P.B. Leonard (who was almost always addressed as "Leonard") -- would take over the facilities of CFMT. Ostensibly without the knowledge of the station owners, Chuck and company had found "a bunch of cool old tapes in the basement", and – each night after the station officially went off the air – would start broadcasting their favourite shows while fooling around with the equipment. In the series continuity, rather than fire Chuck, the station decided to let him continue by giving Chuck his own overnight show.

The All-Night Show generally showed reruns of classic series such as The Twilight Zone, The Outer Limits, The Prisoner, Car 54, Where Are You?, The Beverly Hillbillies, Dave Allen at Large, Sgt. Bilko, and many others. The show filled the space in between each episode with current and decades-old music videos (including old Scopitones), old movie shorts, clips sent in from viewers, viewer call-in segments, and comedic banter (and sometimes sketches) with Chuck and the crew. Guests would also sometimes drop by; some were recurring series characters like Fran The Night Nurse, but others were comedians and entertainers who might do a short stand-up set, sing, or otherwise perform.

Within the continuity of the show, the entire broadcast crew consisted of Chuck, Ryerson and Leonard. In reality, the show had a production and technical crew of over a dozen people. Many of those staffers can be seen in bit roles in sketches or bumpers.

== Cast ==
Chas Lawther played Chuck, a friendly, slightly awkward late-night security guard. Chuck addressed the audience directly, and introduced the night's programming from a TV studio control panel—actually placing the video tapes in the playback machine to be played on air. Chuck's show opening, a loud, upbeat "Hey, you!", became a catchphrase for both the character and the show. Occasionally, Chuck would venture beyond his base in the CFMT TV control room and explore the empty station at night while doing his rounds; memorably, he once broke into real-life station president Dan Iannuzzi's office and made himself at home in Iannuzzi's absence.

The other ever-present regular on the show was Chuck's often-heard but never-seen friend Ryerson Dupont (Errol Bruce), the Scottish-accented camera operator. As an in-joke, Ryerson was named after Toronto's Ryerson Polytechnical Institute, known for its Radio and Television Arts program. Heard far less frequently as an off-camera voice was audio technician P.B. Leonard, played by Michael Lennick. (Behind the scenes, Bruce and Lennick really did operate the camera and run the audio system, and were also the show's co-directors and co-writers.)

A continuing feature had the lips of Maurice LaMarche inserted into a photograph of a famous person, and having LaMarche imitate that person to deliver a show promo or announcement. When LaMarche left the show, a young up-and-coming comic named Jim Carrey was recruited to take his place as a voice actor. Both Carrey and LaMarche were at this point just beginning their careers.

Seen on-camera from time to time was Suzette Couture as Fran the Night Nurse, a cheerful friend who would drop by to visit Chuck after her late shift had ended. Another recurring character was Paul Goldberg as Paul del Stud, a fifties-styled 'greaser' who would incongruously read out household cleaning tips as show bumpers leading into or out of commercials.

== Content and recurring features ==
The show had a deliberately loose, semi-unstructured feel. Viewers would often call in and chat with Chuck and Ryerson—the day after the death of John Lennon, much of the show was devoted to viewers calling in and sharing their stories of their reaction to Lennon's death. Viewers were also encouraged to send in videos they had made, and some viewers would do this frequently, becoming semi-regular contributors to the show. There were periodic contests, with viewers being invited to correctly guess the origin of old movie clips, or to identify actors in the TV series being shown. One memorable contest featured producer Jeff Silverman (in character as a pirate) giving clues to the location of a buried treasure. Unfortunately, the show found themselves in trouble with the local police when a larger-than-expected crowd of people, spurred on by the clues, started digging up very large swathes of Toronto's isolated Cherry Beach to recover the hidden 'treasure', creating a safety hazard for beach visitors.

A recurring feature was "The Elevator To The Stars", in which various individual local performers would ride the CFMT freight elevator up to the studio level and—without leaving the elevator—be given a short period of time to sing, dance, or tell jokes on-air before the elevator doors closed and took them downstairs again.

The show would have musical guests, usually on Thursday nights, both as interview guests and as performers. Notable musicians who appeared on The All Night Show included James Cotton, Richie Havens, David Wilcox, Domenic Troiano, Bruce Cockburn, Burton Cummings, Mary Margaret O'Hara and King Biscuit Boy. Other guests would occasionally be interviewed; however, a supposed interview with Twilight Zone writer/director Montgomery Pittman (via telephone) was a hoax, as Pittman died in 1962. "Pittman", it was later revealed, was played by Wayne Robson.

== Demise ==
The show only lasted one year, ending when CFMT cut its budget for the time slot. In the final moments of the final episode, as the credits rolled, Ryerson was finally seen on camera.

About a year later, Chuck alongside Ryerson (who was again completely unseen) were the hosts of a videotape called Chuck's Choice Cuts, in which Chuck introduced a mix of short subjects, film clips and music videos in a style very similar to The All-Night Show.

Ten Thousand Shiftless Nights, a documentary about The All Night Show (which also served as a de facto reunion special) was aired on CFMT in 2007. The special was hosted by Lawther, and featured clips and reminiscences from Lawther, Bruce, Silverman, Lennick and others associated with the show.
