= Russian National Movie Awards =

Georges Award
- Awarded for: Excellence in cinematic achievements
- Country: Russia
- First award: 2005
- Website: national-movie-awards.ru

The Russian National Movie Award, also known as the "Georges", is an annual award presented to recognize excellence of professionals in the film industry, directors, actors, and writers. The award was established by LiveJournal bloggers Alexander Folin, Maxim Alexandrov and Olga Belik in 2005. Historically given during the first quarter of the new year, the awards honor achievements for cinematic accomplishments for the preceding year. Winners of the award are voted by the public.

The name of the award comes from French film director Georges Méliès. The various category winners are awarded a copy of a statuette. The awarding statuette was created by artist Natalia Petrova and represents a matryoshka, which is considered a direct symbol of Russia and folk art.

== Categories ==
The Georges Award consists of fifteen merit awards for films and television series from the previous year, as well as honorary awards for lifetime achievement.

National categories

- Best Feature Film – Action
- Best Feature Film – Comedy
- Best Feature Film – Drama
- Best Animated Feature Film
- Best Actor
- Best Actress
- Outstanding Comedy Series
- Outstanding Drama Series

International categories

- Best Foreign Film – Action
- Best Foreign Film – Comedy
- Best Foreign Film – Drama
- Best Actor – International
- Best Actress – International
- Outstanding Comedy Series – International
- Outstanding Drama Series – International
- Georges Special Prize
