= The Sex and Violence Family Hour =

1980 film by Harvey Frost

- Directed by: Harvey Frost
- Written by: Chris Bearde; Suzette Couture; Debbie Denomy; Kate Ford; Chas Lawther; James Shavick
- Produced by: Chris Bearde; James Shavick; Harvey Frost
- Starring: Teri Austin; George Buza
- Edited by: Dean Balser; James R. Corston
- Music by: Peter Jermyn; Drew King
- Release date: 1983
- Country: United States
- Language: English

The Sex and Violence Family Hour is a 1983 sex comedy film with a jumble of sexual skits such as "The Big Salami", "The Brady Bang" and "Leather And Chains".

== Cast ==
- Teri Austin as Various Personalities
- George Buza as Various Personalities
- Evan Carter as Various Personalities
- Suzette Couture as Various Personalities
- Debbie Denomy as The New Berlin Wave / Various Personalities
- Kate Ford as The New Berlin Wave / Various Personalities
- Laura Dickson as Various Personalities
- Kate Lynch as Various Personalities
- Linda Dowds as Additional Cast
- Susan Francis as Additional Cast
- Donna Henry as Additional Cast
- Toni Alessandrini as Body Flash Dancer
- Cheryl Baker as Body Flash Dancer
- Kim Morris as Body Flash Dancer
- Tamarah Park as Body Flash Dancer
- Jewel Shepard as Body Flash Dancer
