= S.W.A.T. (2003 film) =

2003 film directed by Clark Johnson

- Theatrical release poster
- Directed by: Clark Johnson
- Screenplay by: David Ayer; David McKenna
- Story by: Ron Mita; Jim McClain
- Based on: S.W.A.T. by Robert Hamner
- Produced by: Dan Halsted; Chris Lee; Neal H. Moritz
- Starring: Samuel L. Jackson; Colin Farrell; Michelle Rodriguez; LL Cool J; Josh Charles; Jeremy Renner; Brian Van Holt; Olivier Martinez
- Cinematography: Gabriel Beristain
- Edited by: Michael Tronick
- Music by: Elliot Goldenthal
- Production companies: Columbia Pictures; Original Film; Camelot Pictures; Chris Lee Productions
- Distributed by: Sony Pictures Releasing
- Release date: August 8, 2003
- Running time: 117 minutes
- Country: United States
- Language: English
- Budget: $70 million
- Box office: $207.7 million

S.W.A.T. is a 2003 American action crime thriller film based on the 1975–76 television series of the same name. The film was directed by Clark Johnson from a screenplay by David Ayer and David McKenna, based on a story by Ron Mita and Jim McClain. It stars Samuel L. Jackson, Colin Farrell, Michelle Rodriguez, LL Cool J, Josh Charles, Jeremy Renner, Brian Van Holt and Olivier Martinez with Reg E. Cathey and Larry Poindexter in supporting roles.

Like the TV series, the film revolves around a police Special Weapons and Tactics (SWAT) team operating in Los Angeles California. The plot follows Hondo (Jackson) and his SWAT team as they are tasked to escort an imprisoned drug kingpin/international fugitive to prison, but face heavy resistance after the kingpin offers a $100 million reward to anyone who can break him out of police custody.

Plans for a film adaptation of the 1975 TV series began in the 1990s, but never materialized until the early 2000s. Johnson was hired as director and Jackson, Farrell and LL Cool J were cast in 2002.

S.W.A.T. was released in the United States on August 8, 2003, by Sony Pictures Releasing. The film received mixed reviews from critics and grossed $207.7 million worldwide against a production budget of $70 million. The film was followed by two direct-to-video sequels, S.W.A.T.: Firefight and S.W.A.T.: Under Siege, were released in 2011 and 2017, respectively.

== Plot ==
Los Angeles Police Department SWAT officer Jim Street, his partner Brian Gamble, and their team infiltrate a bank taken hostage by robbers (in a scene loosely based on the North Hollywood shootout), where Gamble disobeys orders and engages the robbers, accidentally wounding a hostage in the process. He and Street manage to subdue the criminals but are taken off the SWAT team by Captain Fuller, the commanding officer of the LAPD Metropolitan Division, but were put in police inventory, courtesy of Velasquez. Gamble lashes out at the decision and quits. Fuller offers Street a chance to rejoin the team by implicating Gamble, but he refuses. Gamble, under the assumption that Street sold him out to stay on SWAT, ends their partnership.

Six months later, the chief of police calls on LAPD veteran, Sergeant Daniel "Hondo" Harrelson, to reorganize the SWAT team. Hondo takes an interest in Street, and recruits him along with fellow officers TJ McCabe, Michael Boxer, Deacon Kaye, and Chris Sanchez, despite Fuller's protests on Street and Sanchez. Fuller hands Hondo his team, but warns Hondo that he and Street would be discharged should they fail. At first, Street and Boxer butt heads since Street's ex-girlfriend, Lara, whom he just broke up with, was Boxer's sister. The team eventually bond as they train together and manage to pass their numerous tests; as they celebrate afterward, Street has a hostile run-in with Gamble. The team then succeeds in their first real mission: subduing a Polish hostage by using a wall-breaching battering ram designed by Street.

Meanwhile, French drug lord Alexander Montel arrives in Los Angeles and kills his uncle for embezzlement after assuming control of his family's criminal empire by killing his father. As he drives to the airport in his uncle's car, he is pulled over by police for a broken tail light, and detained due to discrepancies with his false I.D.; authorities determine that he is an international fugitive and is wanted by Interpol. Montel's associates, disguised as LAPD officers, attempt to break him out as he is being transferred to jail, killing two Sheriff's deputies. Hondo's team manages to arrive in time to kill the gunmen and recapture Montel. As reporters swarm the team, Montel announces to the cameras that he is willing to offer $100 million to whoever is able to break him out, which draws the attention of criminals and gangs across the city.

The LAPD prepare to transfer Montel into federal custody by air, but are unable to escape before Gamble shoots down the helicopter. The police send out a large convoy, which is ambushed by gang members whom discovered it to be a decoy for Hondo's team, who transport Montel in two SUVs. McCabe reveals himself to be in league with Gamble, who critically wounds Boxer and escapes with Montel and McCabe to the subway, where they hijack a subway car and flee through the sewers as the SWAT team gives chase. Fuller then sends all available units to Hawthorne Airport to prevent Montel from escaping by plane.

Hondo's team commandeers a limousine to reach the airport but discover that Gamble has a private plane that will land on the Sixth Street Bridge to fly the criminals out of the country. Preparing to take off, the plane is intercepted and derailed by the SWAT team; Gamble's men are killed, Sanchez is wounded while Kaye recaptures Montel, and Hondo confronts a wounded McCabe, who commits suicide. Street pursues Gamble to the railyard under the bridge, where they fight hand-to-hand until Gamble is knocked under a passing train and killed. Fuller and the rest of the LAPD arrive, and Hondo's team delivers Montel to federal prison. As the team drives back to Los Angeles, they receive a report of an armed robbery in progress to which Hondo readies his team with prompting from Street.

== Cast ==
- Samuel L. Jackson as Sgt. Dan "Hondo" Harrelson, an old school SWAT team leader
- Colin Farrell as Officer James "Jim" Street, a demoted SWAT officer and ex-Navy SEAL brought onto Hondo's team
- Michelle Rodriguez as Officer Christina "Chris" Sanchez, a rule-bending officer and single mother brought onto Hondo's team
- LL Cool J as Officer Deacon "Deke" Kaye, a beat cop brought onto Hondo's team
- Josh Charles as Officer T.J. McCabe, a cocky SWAT officer and marksman brought onto Hondo's team
- Jeremy Renner as Officer Brian Gamble, Street's former partner and former SWAT officer
- Brian Van Holt as Officer Michael Boxer, a hard-headed SWAT officer brought onto Hondo's team
- Olivier Martinez as Alex "Le Loup Rouge" Montel (his nickname means "The Red Wolf"), an internationally wanted French criminal and vicious killer
- Reg E. Cathey as Lieutenant Greg Velasquez, leader of LAPD SWAT
- Larry Poindexter as Captain Tom Fuller, the SWAT teams' supervisor
- Ashley Scott as Lara Boxer, Street's ex-girlfriend and Michael's sister
- Ken Davitian as Martin Gascoigne, Alex Montel's thieving uncle
- Page Kennedy as Travis, Gamble's criminal buddy
- Domenick Lombardozzi as GQ, Alex Montel's entourage
- Denis Arndt as Sgt. Howard
- Jeff Wincott as Ed Taylor
- Jenya Lano as Monique
- Octavia Spencer as Neighbor in Alley
- Bridget Powers as herself

Original series actors Steve Forrest and Rod Perry have cameo appearances; Forrest drives the team's van, while Perry appears as Kaye's father.

Reed Diamond has a cameo as Officer David Burress. Diamond and director Clark Johnson appeared together on Homicide: Life on the Street for three seasons (in two of which their characters were partners). Johnson himself has a cameo as "Deke's Handsome Partner," who gets hit with a pan while Deke chases a suspect.

== Production ==
=== Development ===
Development of a feature film adaptation of the 1975 television series S.W.A.T. began in 1997, when Sony Pictures announced plans to produce the project through TriStar Pictures. Arnold Schwarzenegger was attached to star, Marcus Nispel was hired to direct, and Oliver Stone was set to produce. Principal photography was scheduled to begin in October 1997, but the production stalled after Nispel departed only weeks before filming was due to commence. Stone, Renny Harlin, and Roger Spottiswoode were subsequently reported as potential replacements, although the project ultimately entered development limbo. Development was revived in 2000, when the film moved to Columbia Pictures with plans to retool it to a younger audience. Zack Snyder was announced to direct, while David Ayer was brought on to produce a new script. Following the box-office success of The Fast and the Furious (2001), Neal H. Moritz joined the project. Moritz, who had become associated with contemporary action franchises featuring younger ensemble casts, helped reshape S.W.A.T. into a large-scale studio action film. Snyder eventually departed over creative differences, later revealing that he envisioned the film as a gritty, R-rated action thriller. In a 2024 interview, Snyder described his version as "300 with machine guns," saying that the studio instead preferred "a PG-13 commercial action movie." Clark Johnson was subsequently hired to direct the final version of the film.

=== Casting ===
For the role of Jim Street, Mark Wahlberg was the first choice for the role, but he turned it down in favor of portraying the lead role in The Italian Job (which was also being filmed in Los Angeles). Afterwards, Paul Walker was originally cast and had even started training for the part, but had to drop out when filming on 2 Fast 2 Furious began. Colin Farrell eventually replaced him in July 2002. Farrell later recalled that he underwent extensive physical conditioning and firearms instruction before filming, describing the training as "one of the toughest things" he had done for a film.

LL Cool J was cast as Deacon "Deke" Kaye in September 2002 after Vin Diesel declined the offer due to his commitment to The Chronicles of Riddick. LL Cool J trained alongside members of the Los Angeles Police Department's SWAT unit to familiarize himself with tactical procedures and team operations. Samuel L. Jackson and Michelle Rodriguez were cast as veteran SWAT officers Daniel "Hondo" Harrelson and Chris Sanchez, respectively, while Olivier Martinez portrayed French drug kingpin Alex Montel. Jeremy Renner was cast as Brian Gamble after attracting attention for his acclaimed performance in Dahmer (2002). According to Renner, he accepted the antagonist role because he found Gamble's moral decline more interesting than portraying another conventional police officer. Farrell and Renner became friends during production.

Johnson later praised the ensemble cast, noting that he wanted performers who could convincingly function as a tactical unit while maintaining distinct personalities.

=== Filming ===
To prepare the cast, technical advisers from the Los Angeles Police Department conducted intensive tactical training that included room-clearing exercises, weapons handling, team movement, and rappelling techniques. Johnson encouraged the actors to perform as many of their own tactical movements as possible to create the appearance of an experienced SWAT unit.

Principal photography began in September 2002 and took place primarily on location throughout Los Angeles. Johnson chose to shoot extensively in practical locations to enhance the film's realism and reflect the urban environment in which the LAPD's Special Weapons and Tactics unit operates. Johnson explained that shooting on real Los Angeles streets helped ground the film's action, stating that the city itself became "another character" in the story.

The bank robbery in the film's opening was choreographed to closely resemble the North Hollywood shootout of 1997 and uses real dispatch audio from that incident. It was filmed at an abandoned building at the corner Workman St and N Broadway in Lincoln Heights. The unit's training scenes were filmed at the city's historic Ambassador Hotel; the building was demolished in 2006. The film's climax was shot on the former Sixth Street Viaduct, once one of Hollywood's most popular bridges for location filming.

=== Music ===
The film's score was composed by Elliot Goldenthal. The film also features several licensed songs not included on the official soundtrack album, including music by Linkin Park, The Rolling Stones, Jane's Addiction, El Gran Silencio, and Paulina Rubio.

== Release ==
S.W.A.T. saw a nationwide release in North America playing in 3,202 theaters, on the weekend of August 8, 2003.

The film was released in Japan in the weekend of September 27, 2003, and United Kingdom, in the weekend of December 4, 2003.

=== Home media ===
The film was released on a Special Edition DVD, in both Widescreen (2.39:1) and Full Screen (1.33:1) formats, on December 30, 2003. The DVD includes a commentary by director Clark Johnson, deleted scenes, a making-of documentary, featurettes on the film's action sequences and weapons, storyboards, and theatrical trailers. The film was released on Blu-ray Disc on September 19, 2006, featuring a 1080p high-definition transfer and carrying over many of the DVD's supplemental features.

== Reception ==
=== Box office ===
S.W.A.T. earned $13,584,444 from its opening day at the North American box office. The film grossed over $37,062,535 on its opening weekend in 3,202 theaters with an average of $11,574 per theatre, ranking at #1 ahead of fellow new release Freaky Friday ($22.2 million) and previous holdover American Wedding ($15.4 million). It achieved the fifth-highest August opening debut at the time behind Rush Hour 2, Signs, American Pie 2 and XXX, one of the largest openings ever for a film released in August, and the fourth biggest opening weekend for a Neal H. Moritz film behind 2 Fast 2 Furious, XXX, and The Fast and the Furious. S.W.A.T. also achieved the third-highest opening weekend for a film based on a television series at the time behind Mission: Impossible 2 and Mission: Impossible.

The film dropped 51.1% on its second weekend to #2 earning $18,122,486, finishing behind Freddy vs. Jason ($36.4 million). It held on to the second spot on its third weekend with an additional $10,581,327, and remained in the domestic top ten for eight consecutive weekends before leaving the chart in October. The biggest market in other territories were Japan, United Kingdom, Spain and Germany, where the film grossed $16.9 million, $9.7 million, $7.1 million, and $6.47 million respectively. S.W.A.T. ended its box office run on December 11, 2003, with a final gross of $116,934,650 in North America and $90,790,989 in other territories, resulting in a worldwide total of $207,725,639. With a budget of $70 million, it finished as the 22nd highest-grossing film worldwide of 2003, and the 18th highest-grossing film in the United States and Canada the same year. It is also the 32nd highest-grossing film based on a television series.

=== Critical response ===
The film received mixed reviews from critics. On Rotten Tomatoes, the film has an approval rating of 48%, based on 168 reviews, with an average rating of 5.4/10. The site's consensus reads, "A competent, but routine police thriller." On Metacritic, the film has a score of 45 out of 100, based on 35 critics, indicating "Mixed or average reviews". Audiences surveyed by CinemaScore gave the film a grade B+ on a scale of A to F.

Film critic Roger Ebert of the Chicago Sun-Times gave S.W.A.T. a favorable rating of three stars, as well as a thumbs up on At the Movies. He complimented the characters, dialogue, and the action sequences, which he found believable.

=== Accolades ===
List of awards and nominations
Award / Film Festival	Category	Recipient(s)	Result
BET Awards	Best Actor	Samuel L. Jackson	Nominated
Black Reel Awards	Best Film	S.W.A.T.	Nominated
California on Location Awards	Location Professional of the Year - Features	Mark Benton Johnson (Shared with Holes)	Won
Irish Film & Television Academy	Best Lead Actor – Film	Colin Farrell	Nominated
MTV Movie Awards Mexico	Best Colin Farrell in a Movie	S.W.A.T.	Won

== Franchise ==
=== Sequels ===
A direct-to-video film titled S.W.A.T.: Firefight came out in 2011. None of the main actors reprised their roles. A second direct-to-video movie titled S.W.A.T.: Under Siege came out in 2017.

=== Television series ===
In February 2017, CBS ordered a pilot based on the movie with Justin Lin, Shawn Ryan, and Moritz as producers. Stephanie Sigman, Shemar Moore, and Jay Harrington were reported to star in the series. Justin Lin was announced to be directing the pilot.

The series premiered on November 2, 2017 and ran for eight seasons until May 16, 2025.
