= Jim Carrey =

Canadian and American actor (born 1962)

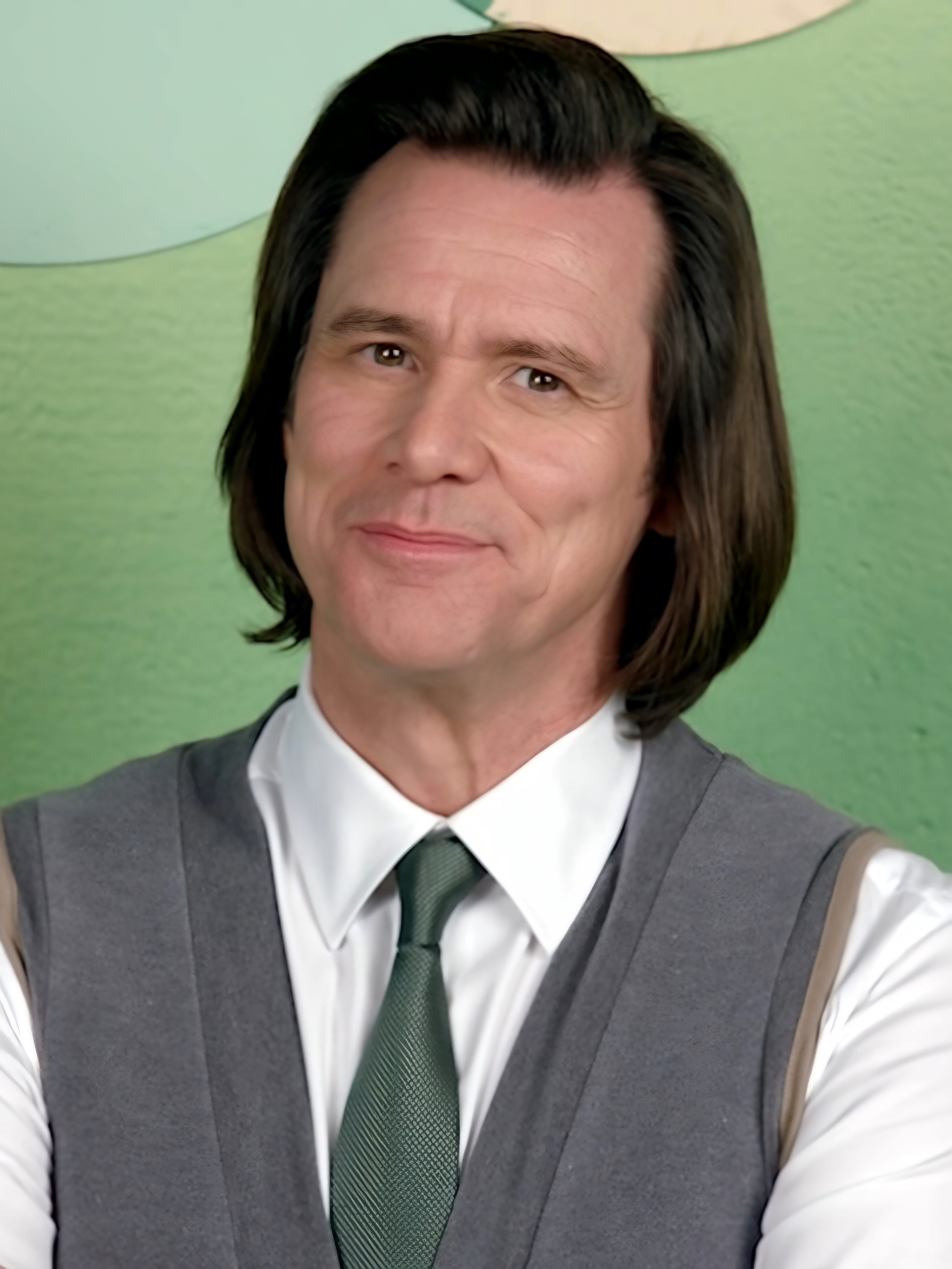
- Carrey in 2020
- Born: James Eugene Carrey; January 17, 1962 (age 64); Newmarket, Ontario, Canada
- Citizenship: Canada; United States
- Occupations: Actor; comedian; visual artist
- Years active: 1977–present
- Works: Full list
- Spouses: Melissa Womer (m. 1987; div. 1995); Lauren Holly (m. 1996; div. 1997); Min Ah (m. 2026)
- Partner: Jenny McCarthy (2005–2010)
- Children: 1
- Awards: Full list

James Eugene Carrey (/ˈkæri/; born January 17, 1962) is a Canadian and American actor, comedian, and visual artist. Known primarily for his energetic slapstick performances, he is regarded as one of the most prominent comedic actors of his generation.

After spending the 1980s honing his comedy act and playing supporting roles in films, Carrey gained recognition when he was cast in the Fox sketch comedy series In Living Color (1990–1994). He broke out as a film star after starring in a string of box office hits, such as Ace Ventura: Pet Detective, The Mask, Dumb and Dumber (all 1994), Ace Ventura: When Nature Calls, and Batman Forever (both 1995). The success of these five films led to Carrey being the first comic actor to receive an upfront $20 million salary for performing in films, beginning with The Cable Guy (1996).

Carrey continued to have success as a leading actor in comedies such as Liar Liar (1997), How the Grinch Stole Christmas (2000), Bruce Almighty (2003), Lemony Snicket's A Series of Unfortunate Events (2004), and Yes Man (2008). Since the 2010s, Carrey has appeared in fewer films, with notable works including his role as Lloyd Christmas in Dumb and Dumber To (2014) and Doctor Eggman in the Sonic the Hedgehog film series (2020–present).

Although largely typecast as a comedic actor, Carrey had success in dramatic roles. His critically acclaimed performances include the title role in The Truman Show (1998) and Andy Kaufman in Man on the Moon (1999), winning Golden Globe Awards for each film. He starred in the romantic drama film Eternal Sunshine of the Spotless Mind (2004), for which he was nominated for a BAFTA Award and another Golden Globe. Carrey also starred in the Showtime tragicomedy series Kidding (2018–2020), receiving his seventh Golden Globe nomination for his performance.

== Early life ==
Carrey was born in Newmarket, Ontario, Canada, to Kathleen (née Oram), a homemaker, and Percy Carrey, a musician and accountant. He was raised Catholic and had three older siblings. His mother was of Irish and Scottish descent, and his father was of French Canadian ancestry; the family's original surname was Carré. Carrey's sixth great-grandfather, Marc-François Carré, was a marchand-mercier from Côtes-d'Armor who emigrated to Quebec in 1740.

At age eight, he began making faces before a mirror and discovered a talent for doing impressions. At age ten, Carrey wrote a letter to Carol Burnett of the Carol Burnett Show pointing out that he was already a master of impressions and should be considered for a role on the show; he was overjoyed when he received a form letter reply. A fan of Monty Python, whose television show Monty Python's Flying Circus aired in the 1970s, in 2014 Carrey appeared on Monty Python's Best Bits (Mostly) and recalled the effect on him of Ernest Scribbler (played by Michael Palin) laughing himself to death in "The Funniest Joke in the World" sketch. Radio Times states, "You'll see why immediately: Palin's performance is uncannily Carreyesque."

Carrey spent his early years in the borough of Scarborough, Ontario, part of Metropolitan Toronto, where he attended Blessed Trinity Catholic Elementary School in North York. His family later moved to Burlington, Ontario, where they would spend eight years; Carrey attended Aldershot High School while there. Some time later, his family became homeless and lived together in a Volkswagen van while teenage Carrey and his brother spent months living in a tent in Charles Daley Park on the Lake Ontario shore in Lincoln, Ontario. The family struggled financially; however, their situation started improving once his father found employment in the accounting department at the Titan Wheels tire factory in Scarborough.

Furthermore, in return for living in the house across the street from the factory, the family—primarily Carrey and his older brother—would work as janitors and security guards at the tire factory, doing eight-hour shifts from 6 pm into the next morning. Moving back to Scarborough, teenage Carrey started attending Agincourt Collegiate Institute before dropping out of school on his sixteenth birthday. He began to perform comedy in downtown Toronto while continuing to work at the factory. In a 2007 Hamilton Spectator interview, Carrey said, "If my career in show business hadn't panned out I would probably be working today in Hamilton, Ontario, at the Dofasco steel mill." As a young man, he could see the steel mills across the Burlington Bay and often thought that was "where the great jobs were."

== Career ==
=== 1977–1982: Early impressionist work in Toronto ===
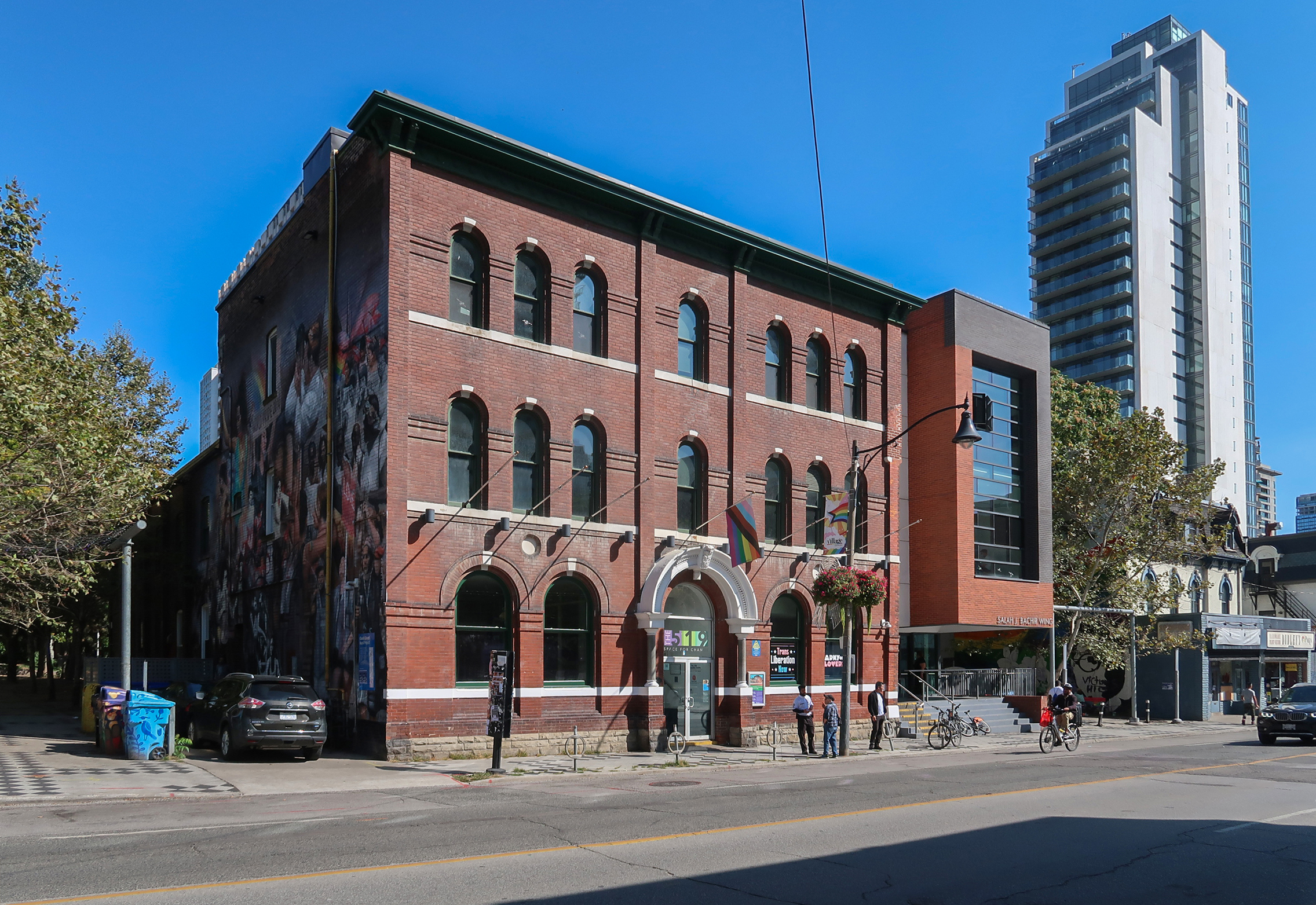
Carrey made his first performance at a Yuk Yuk's comedy club located at the basement of The 519 in 1977.

Carrey's first stand-up comedy experience took place in 1977 at the age of 15 with his father trying to help him put together a stage act, driving him to downtown Toronto to debut at the recently opened Yuk Yuk's comedy club operating one-night-a-week out of community center The 519's basement on Church Street. For the performance, Carrey had his attire—a polyester leisure suit—chosen by his mother who reasoned "that's how they dress on The Dean Martin Celebrity Roast". Pubescent Carrey's conventional impersonations bombed, proving ill-suited for a club with a raunchy comedic sensibility and giving him doubts about his potential as a professional entertainer. Decades later, recalling Carrey's stand-up debut, Yuk Yuk's owner Mark Breslin described it as "bad Rich Little". His family's financial struggles made it difficult for them to support Carrey's show business ambitions.

Eventually, the family's financial situation improved and they moved into a new home in Jackson's Point. With more domestic stability, Carrey returned to the stage in 1979 with a more polished act that led to his first paid gig: a 20-minute spot at the Hay Loft club on Highway 48 in Scarborough for a reported $20 compensation on a bill with the Mother of Pearl performer from The Pig and Whistle. He soon faced his fears and went back downtown to the site of his debacle from two years earlier—Yuk Yuk's that had in the meantime moved into a permanent location on Bay Street in the fashionable Yorkville district. In a short period of time, the seventeen-year-old went from open-mic nights at the club to regular paid shows, building his reputation in the process.

Parallel to his increasing local Toronto-area popularity as an impressionist stand-up comic, Carrey tried to break into sketch comedy, auditioning to be a cast member for the 1980–81 season of NBC's Saturday Night Live. Carrey ended up not being selected by the show's new executive producer Jean Doumanian who picked thirty-one-year-old Charles Rocket instead. Decades later, after establishing himself as a Hollywood film star, Carrey would host the show in May 1996, January 2011, and October 2014. After not getting Saturday Night Live, Carrey took a voice acting job performing Clutch Cargo-inspired bits on The All-Night Show, an overnight program airing locally on the CFMT-TV channel branded as Multilingual Television (MTV).

Continuing to perform his stand-up act of contortionist impressions in the city of Toronto and surrounding towns, in February 1981, nineteen-year-old Carrey was booked as the opening act for the rock band Goddo at The Roxy Theatre in Barrie for two shows on consecutive nights; the rock crowd booed him offstage and he refused to return for the second night. Two weeks later, however, a review of one of Carrey's spots at Yuk Yuk's—alongside a sizable photo of him doing a stage impression of Sammy Davis Jr.—appeared in the Toronto Star on the front page of its entertainment section with the writer Bruce Blackadar raving about "a genuine star coming to life". Save for a brief mention in the Barrie Examiner, it was the first time Carrey received significant mainstream corporate media coverage and the glowing praise in one of Canada's highest-circulation dailies created demand for his impressionist stand-up act throughout the country.

In April 1981, Carrey appeared in an episode of the televised stand-up show An Evening at the Improv. That summer, he landed one of the main roles in Introducing... Janet, a made-for-TV movie that premiered in September 1981 on the CBC drawing more than a million viewers for its first airing in Canada. Playing a struggling impressionist comic Tony Moroni, it was Carrey's first acting role. The CBC promotion the movie had received as well its subsequent high nationwide viewership further solidified the youngster's comedic status in the country; by the time the movie finished its CBC run of repeats several years later, its title for the home video release on VHS was changed to Rubberface in order to take advantage of the comic's by then established prominence for doing elaborate contortionist impressions. Making more comedy club appearances in the United States, Carrey was noticed by comedian Rodney Dangerfield who signed Carrey to open his tour performances. By December 1981, a well-known comic in Canada, Toronto Star reported about Carrey waiting for a United States work permit having received interest from Johnny Carson's Tonight Show, largely off his reputation from Canada.

In the early part of 1982, Carrey reportedly performed for The Tonight Show bookers Jim McCawley and Bud Robinson as part of the program's audition process for stand-up comic spots. However, rather than being booked on the show, Carrey got advised to further hone his act, so he went back home to the Toronto area where he had already built a significant following. Touring venues throughout North America as the opening act for Rodney Dangerfield, Carrey made a stop at home in Toronto on June 19, 1982, performing two sold-out shows at Massey Hall.

=== 1983–1993: Move to Hollywood ===
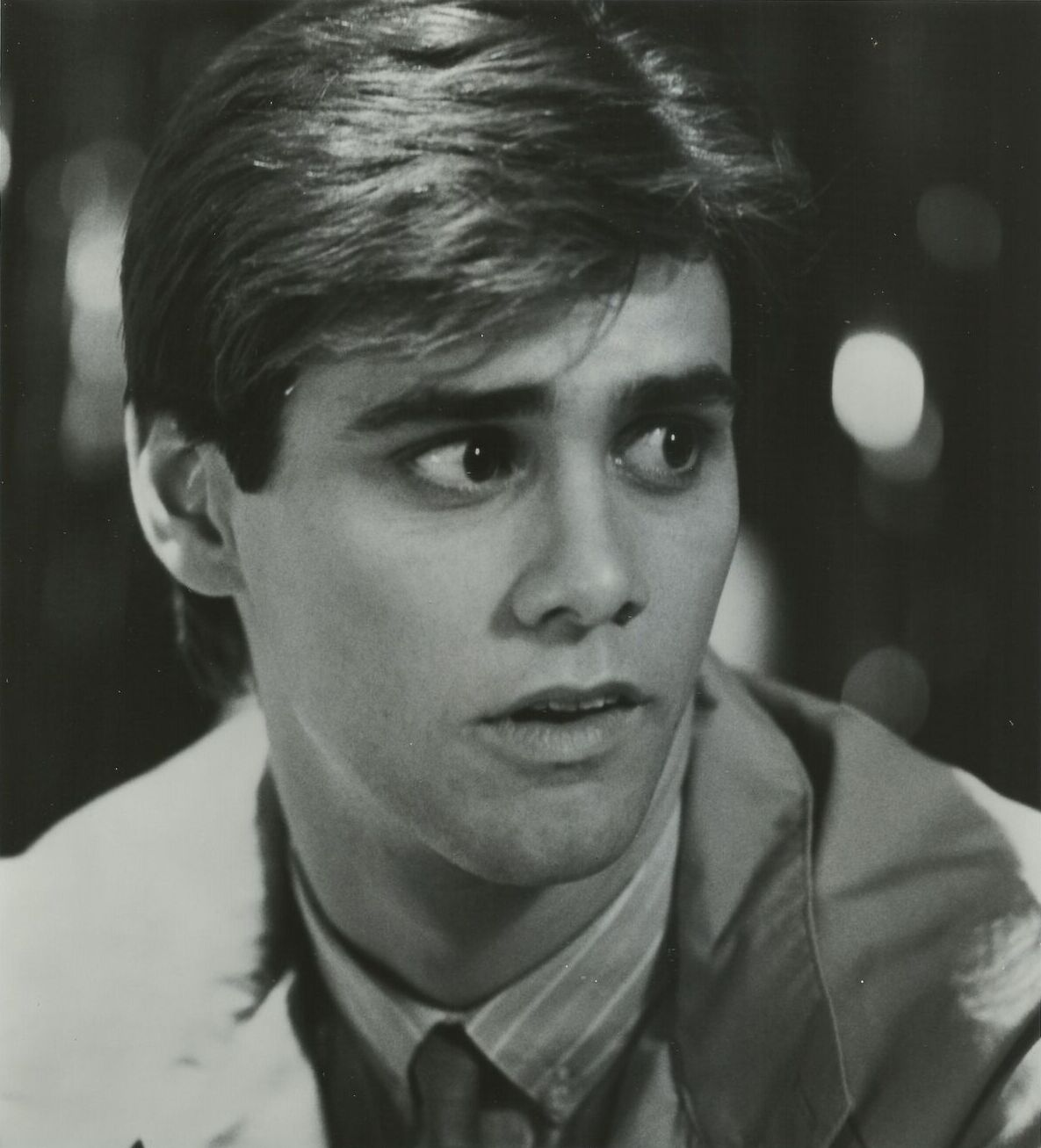
Carrey in 1985

In early 1983, Carrey decided to move to Hollywood where he began regularly performing at The Comedy Store. Getting on The Tonight Show became his immediate career goal, and, by spring 1983, he appeared to have achieved it after getting booked for a stand-up set on the highly-rated late night show. However, a lukewarm club set at The Improv got him unbooked. Though struggling to replicate his success in Los Angeles, Carrey continued being a big hit in his hometown Toronto where he returned during late April 1983 to perform at the short-lived B.B. Magoon's theatrical venue on Bloor Street on three consecutive nights. While in town, CTV's flagship newsmagazine program W5 did a feature on Carrey that aired nationally in Canada. Back in L.A., within months, he landed the main role on The Duck Factory, a sitcom being developed for NBC, and, in late November 1983, still got to debut his impressionist act on The Tonight Show Starring Johnny Carson via a promotional appearance for the sitcom about to start airing nationally in the United States on the same network. In the meantime, he was cast for a supporting role in the Warner Bros. comedy production Finders Keepers, shot in the Canadian province of Alberta during late summer 1983. For his Tonight Show appearance that aired on American Thanksgiving, 21-year-old Carrey went through his most popular impressions—Elvis Presley, Leonid Brezhnev, Jack Nicholson, Bruce Dern, Clint Eastwood, Charles Bronson, Michael Landon, James Dean, E.T. the Extra-Terrestrial, Charles Nelson Reilly, characters from My Three Sons, and Kermit the Frog and Miss Piggy—in rapid succession. After completing his set, though getting the OK gesture from Carson, the impressionist comic was notably not waved over by the host to join him on the couch—a usual indication that while sufficiently pleased, the powerful host was probably not ecstatic about the performance. The end of 1983 saw Carrey go back home to Toronto once more for a publicized New Year's Eve performance at the Royal York Hotel's Imperial Room.

Originally scheduled to start airing in January 1984, The Duck Factory sitcom debuted in April, airing Thursdays at 9:30pm between Cheers and Hill Street Blues. The same month, Carrey took a job hosting the 1984 U-Know Awards ceremony held in Toronto at the Royal York Hotel's Ballroom. By the time he made his debut appearance on NBC's Late Night with David Letterman in late July 1984, the network had already canceled The Duck Factory; Carrey went back to touring with his impressionist act, including often opening for Rodney Dangerfield.

After being noticed doing stand-up by producer Samuel Goldwyn Jr. and contacted to audition for a teen horror sex comedy being developed by The Samuel Goldwyn Company, Carrey landed a starring role in Once Bitten shot in early 1985. Carrey would continue getting film roles; throughout late summer and early fall 1985, he shot a supporting part in Francis Ford Coppola's Peggy Sue Got Married which went into a long post-production process. In parallel, he decided to try out for Saturday Night Live again, this time ahead of the show's 1985–86 season being prepared by returning executive producer Lorne Michaels who was looking to hire an all-new cast. Five years removed from his previous SNL audition, twenty-three-year-old Carrey was rejected again, reportedly never even getting the chance to audition his material—'post-nuclear Elvis' hybrid impression and impersonation of Henry Fonda from On Golden Pond—in front of executive producer Michaels due to the show's producers and senior writers Al Franken, Tom Davis, and Jim Downey deciding that Michaels would not like it. Unlike his previous SNL rejection, Carrey now had a bit of a film career to fall back on in addition to his impressionist stand-up act; Once Bitten was released in mid November 1985 and turned out to be a modest box-office hit despite drawing poor reviews.

Back on the comedy club circuit with impressions, in fall 1986, Carrey auditioned for SNL's upcoming season, his third attempt at getting on the ensemble sketch comedy show. Finally managing to perform for the show's executive producer Lorne Michaels at a Burbank studio, with returning cast members Dennis Miller, Jon Lovitz, and Nora Dunn also watching the audition, Carrey was rejected again. Among the group of hopefuls auditioning alongside Carrey on this occasion were Dana Carvey and Phil Hartman, both of whom were hired. Sensing that doing only impressions was turning into a career dead-end, Carrey set out to develop a new live comedy act. Much to the dismay of comedy club owners booking him, he began abandoning trademark celebrity impressions, opting instead to try adding observational and character humor to his comedic repertoire, a process that often involved forcing himself to improvise and scramble in front of dissatisfied live audiences that came to see him do impressions. From 1990 to 1994, Carrey was a regular cast member of the ensemble comedy television series In Living Color. The popularity of the series helped him to land his first few major film roles.

=== 1994–1999: Rise and critical acclaim ===
Carrey played the lead role in Ace Ventura: Pet Detective which was released in February 1994 and went on to gross $72 million in the United States and Canada. Following its success and before the release of his next film, The Mask, which was anticipated to be another hit, Morgan Creek Productions paid him $5 million to reprise his role as Ace Ventura and New Line Cinema offered him $7 million to make a sequel to The Mask and paid him $7 million to appear in Dumb and Dumber, a nearly tenfold increase on his salary for Ace Ventura. The Mask, released in July 1994, grossed $351 million worldwide, and Dumb and Dumber, released in December 1994, was another commercial success, grossing over $270 million worldwide. Carrey received his first Golden Globe Award nomination for Best Actor for his work in The Mask and was voted second on Quigley's Top Ten Money Making Stars Poll, behind Tom Hanks.

Carrey portrayed the Batman villain the Riddler in the Joel Schumacher-directed superhero film Batman Forever (1995). The film received mixed reviews, but was a box office success. He reprised his role as Ace Ventura in Ace Ventura: When Nature Calls which was also released in 1995. Like the original film, it was well received by the public, but poorly received by critics. It was a huge box-office success, earning $212 million worldwide in addition to breaking records, with a $40 million opening weekend. Carrey became the first comic actor to be paid an upfront salary of $20 million for his next film, The Cable Guy (1996). Directed by Ben Stiller, the film was a satirical black comedy, in which Carrey played a lonely, menacing cable television installer who infiltrates the life of one of his customers (played by Matthew Broderick). The role was a departure from the "hapless, hyper, overconfident" characters he had been known for. However, it did not fare well with most critics, many reacting to Carrey's change of tone from previous films. Carrey also starred in the music video of the film's closing song, "Leave Me Alone" by Jerry Cantrell. Despite the reviews, The Cable Guy grossed $102 million worldwide.

He soon bounced back with the critically acclaimed comedy Liar Liar (1997), playing Fletcher Reede, an unethical lawyer rendered unable to lie by his young son's birthday wish. Carrey was praised for his performance, earning a second Golden Globe Award nomination for Best Actor. Janet Maslin of The New York Times said: "Well into his tumultuous career, Mr. Carrey finally turns up in a straightforward comic vehicle, and the results are much wilder and funnier than this mundane material should have allowed."

The following year he decided to take a pay cut to play the seriocomic role of Truman Burbank in the satirical comedy-drama film The Truman Show (1998). The film was highly praised and brought Carrey further international acclaim, leading many to believe he would be nominated for an Academy Award. He won the Golden Globe Award for Best Actor in a Motion Picture Drama but did not receive an Academy Award nomination. The Truman Show was a commercial success, grossing $264 million worldwide against a budget of $60 million. A Film4 critic stated that the film "allows Carrey to edge away from broad comedy", adding that it was "a hilarious and breathtakingly conceived satire".

That same year, Carrey appeared as a fictionalized version of himself on the final episode of Garry Shandling's The Larry Sanders Show, in which he deliberately ripped into Shandling's character. In 1999, Carrey had the lead role in Man on the Moon. He portrayed comedian Andy Kaufman to critical acclaim and received his second Golden Globe in a row but again failed to be nominated for an Academy Award. In addition, he received his first Screen Actors Guild Award nomination for Best Actor.

=== 2000–2011: Established actor and diversification ===
In 2000, Carrey reteamed with the Farrelly brothers, who had previously directed him in Dumb and Dumber, for the black comedy film Me, Myself & Irene, a film that received mixed reviews but enjoyed box office success. Carrey played the role of state trooper Charlie Baileygates, who has multiple personalities and romances a woman portrayed by Renée Zellweger. That same year, Carrey starred in the second highest-grossing Christmas film of all time, How the Grinch Stole Christmas, playing the title character, for which he received both praise and criticism from critics alongside a Golden Globe nomination.

For his next feature film, Carrey starred opposite Jennifer Aniston and Morgan Freeman in Tom Shadyac's international hit comedy Bruce Almighty (2003). Carrey played a television newsman who unexpectedly receives God's omnipotent abilities when the deity decides to take a vacation. The film received mixed reviews upon release but still became a financial success, earning over $484 million worldwide, and going on to become the seventeenth highest-grossing live action comedy of all time.

In 2004, Carrey starred in Eternal Sunshine of the Spotless Mind. The film received critical acclaim upon release. Critics highly praised Carrey's portrayal of Joel Barish, in addition to the performance of his co-star Kate Winslet, who was nominated for an Oscar. According to CNN's reviewer Paul Clinton, Carrey's performance was the actor's "best, most mature and sharply focused performance ever." Carrey received another Golden Globe nomination and his first BAFTA Award nomination for Best Actor. Carrey's next appearance was in the 2004 black comedy fantasy film Lemony Snicket's A Series of Unfortunate Events, which was based on the children's novels of the same name. The film was positively received; Desson Thomson from The Washington Post said of Carrey's approach to the character of Count Olaf,

Olaf is a humorless villain in the book. He's not amusing like Carrey at all. To which I would counter: If you can't let Carrey be Carrey, put someone boring and less expensive in the role. In his various disguises he's rubbery, inventive and improvisationally inspired. I particularly liked his passing imitation of a dinosaur.

That same year, Carrey was inducted into the Canadian Walk of Fame. In 2005, Carrey starred in the remake of Fun with Dick and Jane with Téa Leoni, which grossed $200 million with a profit of $100 million. Carrey was initially cast to provide the voice of RJ for the DreamWorks Animation film Over the Hedge, but he ultimately quit the project because he was uncomfortable with not having full control over his character's physical and facial movements.

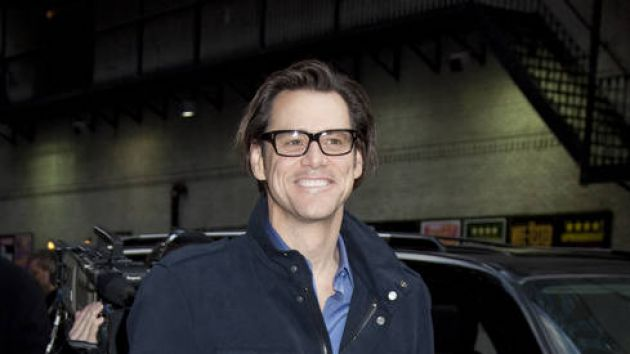
Carrey walking in to the Ed Sullivan Theater, venue for the Late Show with David Letterman, in 2010

Carrey reunited with Joel Schumacher, director of Batman Forever, for The Number 23 (2007), a psychological thriller co-starring Virginia Madsen and Danny Huston. In the film, Carrey plays a man who becomes obsessed with the number 23, after finding a book about a man with the same obsession. The film was panned by critics. The following year Carrey provided his voice for Dr. Seuss' Horton Hears a Who! (2008). Carrey voiced Horton the Elephant for the CGI-animated feature, which was a box office success, grossing over $290 million worldwide. Carrey returned to live-action comedy, starring opposite Zooey Deschanel and Bradley Cooper in Yes Man (also 2008). Carrey played a man who signs up for a self-help program that teaches him to say yes to everything. Despite reviews being mixed, Rene Rodriquez of The Miami Herald stated, "Yes Man is fine as far as Jim Carrey comedies go, but it's even better as a love story that just happens to make you laugh." The film earned $225 million at the box office worldwide.

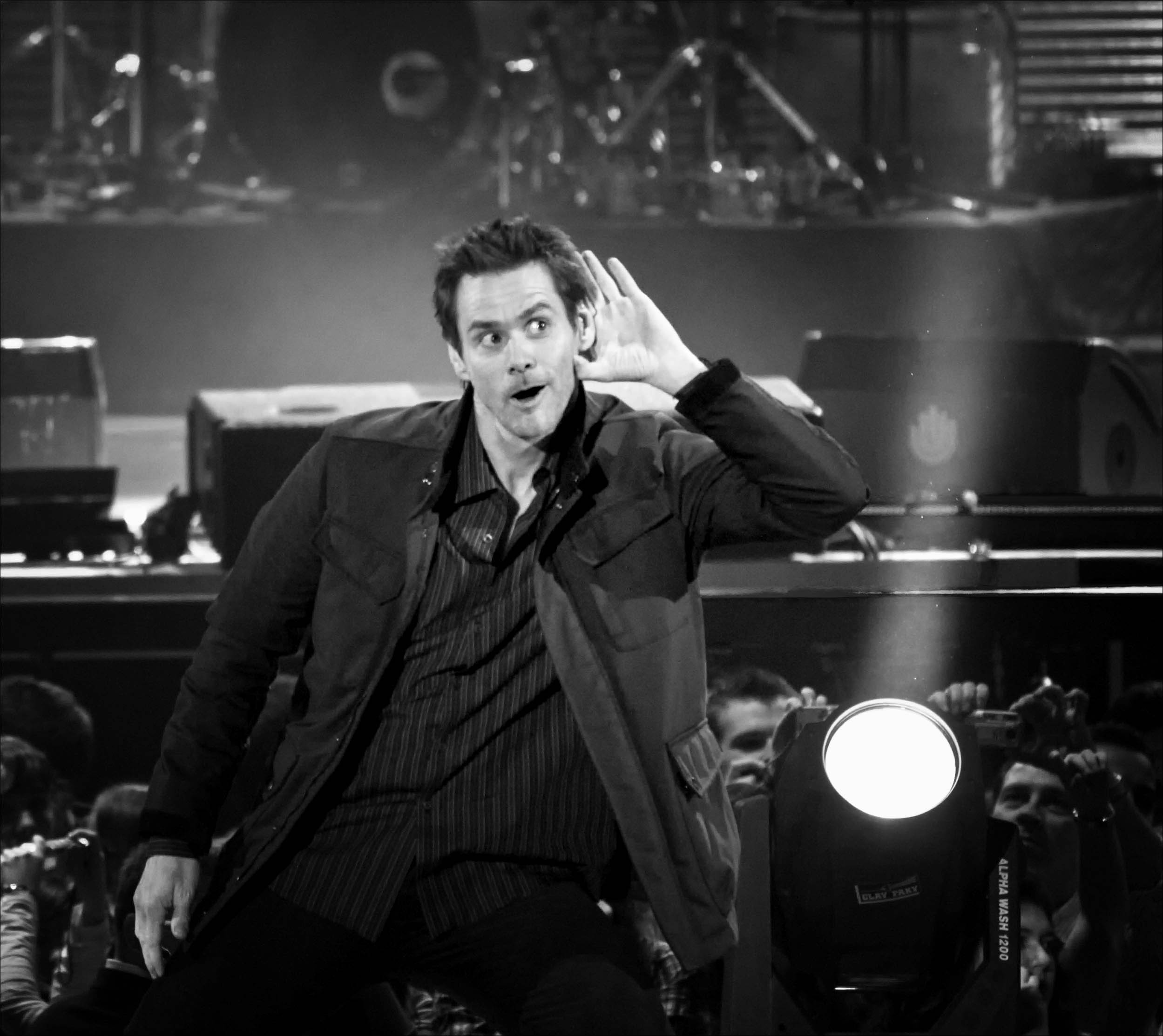
Carrey in Spain in 2008

Since 2009, Carrey's work has included a leading role in Glenn Ficarra and John Requa's I Love You Phillip Morris, premiering in January 2009 at the Sundance Film Festival before receiving a wide release in February 2010. Carrey portrayed Steven Jay Russell, a con artist, imposter, and multiple prison escapee who falls in love with his fellow inmate, Phillip Morris (played by Ewan McGregor). The film received largely positive reviews, with Damon Wise of The Times giving the film four stars out of five, stating, "I Love You Phillip Morris is an extraordinary film that serves as a reminder of just how good Carrey can be when he's not tied into a generic Hollywood crowd-pleaser. His comic timing remains as exquisite as ever." For the first time in his career, Carrey portrayed multiple characters in Disney's 3D animated take on the classic Charles Dickens tale, A Christmas Carol (2009), voicing Ebenezer Scrooge and the Ghosts of Christmas Past, Present, and Future. Directed by Robert Zemeckis, the film also starred Robin Wright Penn, Bob Hoskins, Colin Firth, Gary Oldman, and Cary Elwes. The film received decent reviews and was a financial success. Carrey landed the lead role in Mr. Popper's Penguins (2011), playing Tom Popper Jr., a realtor who becomes the caretaker of a family of penguins. The film received a mixed reception upon release.

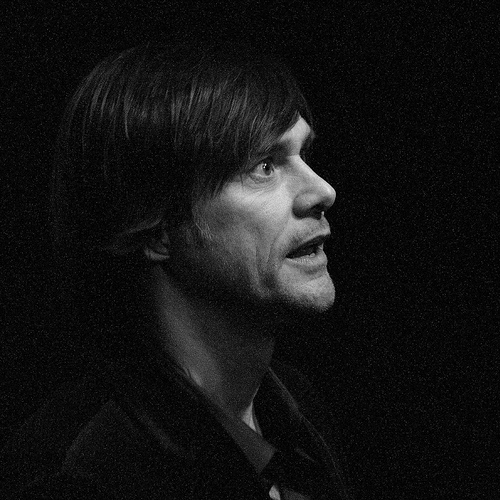
Carrey in 2011

=== 2012–2018: Change in pace ===
He starred alongside former co-star Steve Carell in the Don Scardino-directed comedy film The Incredible Burt Wonderstone (2013). Carrey played Steve Gray, a dangerous street magician who overshadows the formerly successful magician Burt Wonderstone (played by Carell). The film was released in March 2013 to mixed reviews and underperformed significantly at the box office, grossing just over $27 million on a $30 million budget. Around the same time, he appeared in Kick-Ass 2 (also 2013) as Colonel Stars and Stripes. He retracted support for the film two months prior to its release. He issued a statement via his Twitter account that, in light of the Sandy Hook Elementary School shooting, "Now in all good conscience I cannot support that level of violence."

Peter Farrelly said in April 2012 that Carrey and Jeff Daniels would return for a Dumb and Dumber sequel, Dumb and Dumber To, with the Farrelly brothers writing and directing and a planned September 2012 production start. In June, however, Carrey's representative said Carrey had left the project because the comedian felt New Line and Warner Bros. were unenthusiastic toward it. However, on October 1, 2012, Yahoo!'s The Yo Show carried the news item that the script was complete and that the original actors, Carrey and Daniels, would be reprising their roles. The plot involved one of the characters having sired a child and needing to find them to obtain a kidney. Dumb and Dumber To was released in November 2014.

In March 2013, Carrey announced that he had written a children's book titled How Roland Rolls, about a scared wave named Roland. He described it as "kind of a metaphysical children's story, which deals with a lot of heavy stuff in a really childish way." Carrey self-published the book, which was released in September 2013. On March 25, 2013, Carrey released a parody music video with Eels through Funny or Die, with Carrey replacing Mark Oliver Everett on vocals. The song and video, titled "Cold Dead Hand" and set as a musical act during the variety program Hee Haw, lampoons American gun culture, and specifically former NRA spokesperson Charlton Heston. Carrey delivered the commencement address at Maharishi University of Management in Fairfield, Iowa, in May 2014 and received an honorary doctorate for his achievements as a comedian, artist, author, and philanthropist. On August 29, 2014, Carrey was honored by Canada Post with a limited-edition postage stamp with his portrait on it. Carrey was a producer on Rubble Kings, a 2015 documentary film that depicts events preceding and following the Hoe Avenue peace meeting.

In June 2017, Showtime began airing the dramedy I'm Dying Up Here, for which Carrey served as the executive producer. The show, which chronicles a group of stand-up comics in 1970s Los Angeles, incorporates aspects of Carrey's own experience. In September of that year, that same network announced that he would star in a comedy series titled Kidding, which would reunite Carrey and director Michel Gondry. By the end of 2017, it was announced that Catherine Keener would star opposite Carrey in Kidding. The series lasted two seasons.

Carrey was also the subject of two documentaries in 2017. The first, a short subject entitled I Needed Color about his lifelong passion for art, was released online in the summer. Later that year another documentary, Jim & Andy: The Great Beyond—Featuring a Very Special, Contractually Obligated Mention of Tony Clifton, premiered at The Venice Film Festival and was later picked up by Netflix. The film chronicles the behind-the-scenes drama during the shooting of Man on the Moon, when he never broke character as Andy Kaufman. It incorporates footage that was shot for the film's electronic press kit but ultimately pulled by Universal as they felt that it was too damaging.

=== 2019–present: Return to mainstream ===
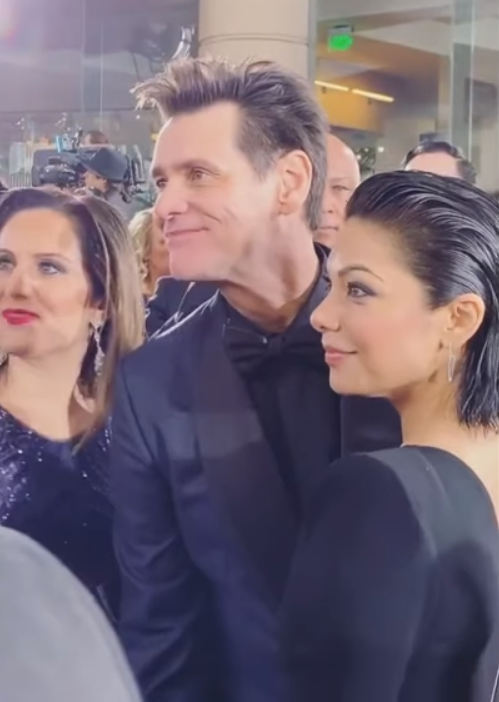
Carrey at the 2019 Golden Globes

In June 2018, Carrey was cast as Doctor Robotnik, the main antagonist of the Sonic the Hedgehog video game series, in a film adaptation of the franchise. The film was released in February 2020 to positive reviews. Carrey's portrayal of Ivo Robotnik was praised, with some considering it one of his best performances in years. Carrey returned for Sonic the Hedgehog 2, released in April 2022, which grossed $72 million at the US box office in its opening weekend to give Carrey the best opening of his career to date.

In 2020, Carrey and novelist Dana Vachon published Memoirs and Misinformation, a surrealist novel with elements of autobiography starring a fictionalized version of Carrey. In September, during the final stages of the 2020 U.S. presidential election, it was announced that Carrey would portray presidential nominee Joe Biden on the 46th season of Saturday Night Live, taking over the role from Jason Sudeikis, Woody Harrelson and John Mulaney. However, many felt Carrey's high-energy comedy style clashed with the real-life Biden's low-key persona, producing an imitation that lacked authenticity, and failed to impress viewers and critics. On December 19, 2020, Carrey announced that he would step down from playing Biden on Saturday Night Live, stating that he had a six-week deal. Cast member Alex Moffat succeeded Carrey in portraying Biden during the cold open of the episode hosted by Kristen Wiig on the same day. Carrey appeared as the narrator of the Weeknd's album Dawn FM, released on January 7, 2022. In February 2022, Carrey reprised his role as Ernie "Chip" Douglas, from the 1996 movie The Cable Guy, in a commercial for Verizon, which aired during the Super Bowl.

In April 2022, Carrey announced that he was considering retirement, saying: "I have enough. I've done enough. I am enough." He said he would return to acting if "angels bring some sort of script that's written in gold ink that says to me that it's going to be really important for people to see". In February 2024, it was announced that Carrey would reprise his role as Dr. Ivo Robotnik in Sonic the Hedgehog 3. A copy of the script for Sonic the Hedgehog 3 was delivered to Carrey written in 24-carat ink in reference to his previous comments. Carrey also plays Ivo Robotnik's grandfather, Gerald Robotnik. Carrey reportedly told an Associated Press reporter that he agreed to return to the Sonic universe because "I need the money, frankly." He later clarified in interviews in December 2024 that he planned to "power rest" rather than retire, while also stating that he was open to continuing his role in the Sonic film series. In March 2026, Carrey was announced to return as Dr. Ivo Robotnik in Sonic the Hedgehog 4 (2027). In August 2026, Carrey was announced to star in the upcoming live-action film The Jetsons, but his role is yet to be confirmed.

In February 2026, Carrey was awarded an Honorary César from the French Académie des Arts et Techniques du Cinéma. He appeared at the ceremony after a long absence from public life and looked and behaved significantly differently enough for some media to say that he was "nearly unrecognizable". His acceptance speech was delivered entirely in French, in which he recalled his family's French roots.

The Internet was divided after makeup artist and impersonator Alexis Stone had said that he had transformed into Carrey that day. Despite that, Carrey's representative stated that the actor had been at the ceremony and he had accepted his award. Gregory Caulier, the organiser of the César awards, commented on the controversy with "for me, it's a non-issue". He noted that Carrey had been working on his speech for months.

== Personal life ==
Carrey has depression and took Prozac to combat the symptoms for years. He later said that he no longer takes medications of any kind and abstains from coffee, alcohol, and drugs.

He received U.S. citizenship in October 2004 and remains a dual citizen of the United States and his native Canada.

Carrey owns various properties in Los Angeles and has lived in Brentwood since 1994. In November 2022, the Russian Ministry of Foreign Affairs banned 100 Canadians, including Carrey, from entering Russia as a reciprocity for the international sanctions which had been introduced due to the 2022 Russian invasion of Ukraine.

=== Relationships ===
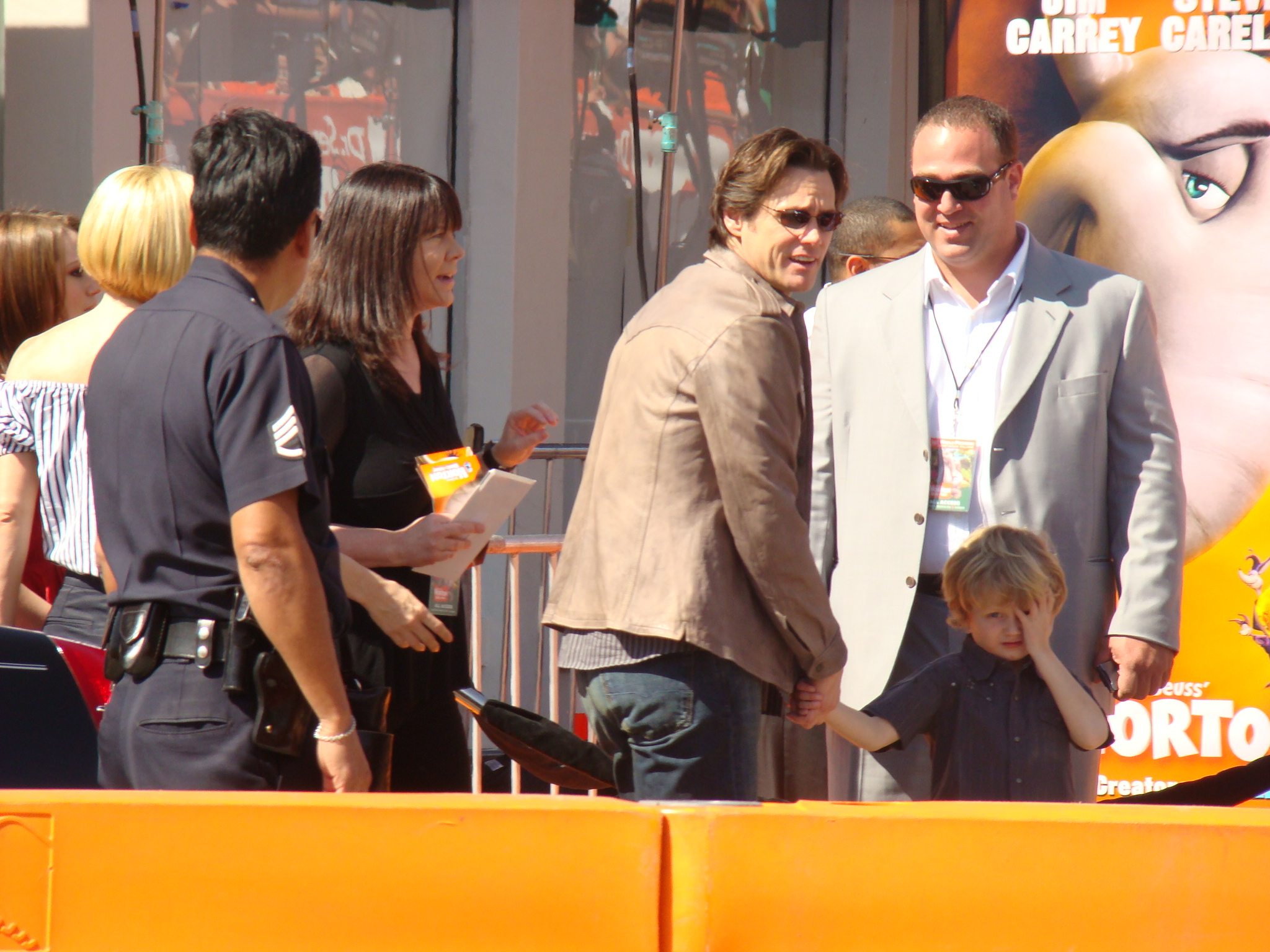
Carrey with his family at the Horton Hears a Who! premiere in 2008

Carrey dated singer Linda Ronstadt for eight months in 1983. On March 28, 1987, Carrey married former actress and Comedy Store waitress Melissa Womer. The couple had one daughter. Carrey and Womer divorced in 1995.

On September 23, 1996, Carrey married his Dumb and Dumber co-star Lauren Holly; this second marriage lasted less than a year. From 1999 to 2000, Carrey was engaged to his Me, Myself & Irene co-star Renée Zellweger. In 2002, he was in a relationship with January Jones. In 2005, Carrey met model and actress Jenny McCarthy, and he made public in June 2006 that they were in a romantic relationship. They ended it in April 2010, with McCarthy noting in October 2010 that they had remained good friends. In early 2011, Carrey was seen holding hands with America's Next Top Model contestant Anchal Joseph, leading to speculation that the two were dating.

In 2012, Carrey met Cathriona White, a makeup artist from County Tipperary, Ireland. They dated between 2012 and 2015. On September 28, 2015, White was found dead from a prescription drug overdose; the death was ruled a suicide by the Los Angeles County Medical Examiner. Carrey was a pallbearer at her funeral in Cappawhite, Ireland. In January 2019 when Carrey attended the Golden Globes 2019 Party, he was accompanied by his then-girlfriend Ginger Gonzaga. The couple split after less than a year of dating.

While accepting an Honorary César in February 2026, Carrey revealed that he was in a long-term relationship with a woman named Min Ah, whom he called his "sublime companion". Seven months later, the couple were married in a private ceremony.

=== Wrongful death lawsuits ===
Carrey's girlfriend Cathriona White married Mark Burton in 2013, in Las Vegas. She and Carrey had been dating on and off since 2012, and she was still married but dating Carrey when she died in 2015. On September 19, 2016, Burton filed a wrongful death lawsuit against Carrey, claiming that he had used his "immense wealth and celebrity status" to illegally obtain and distribute prescription drugs involved in White's death. Carrey released a statement the following day:

What a terrible shame. It would be easy for me to get in a back room with this man's lawyer and make this go away, but there are some moments in life when you have to stand up and defend your honor against the evil in this world. I will not tolerate this heartless attempt to exploit me or the woman I loved. Cat's troubles were born long before I met her and sadly her tragic end was beyond anyone's control. I really hope that some day soon people will stop trying to profit from this and let her rest in peace.

In October 2016, White's mother, Brigid Sweetman, also filed a wrongful death lawsuit against Carrey. Both lawsuits were dismissed on January 25, 2018, and attorneys for both sides confirmed there would be no further legal proceedings.

=== Vaccine skepticism and connection to autism ===
In 2009, Carrey wrote an article questioning the merits of vaccination and discussing its connection to autism for The Huffington Post. With former partner Jenny McCarthy, Carrey led a "Green Our Vaccines" march in Washington, D.C., to advocate for the removal of "toxic substances" from children's vaccines, out of a belief that children had received "too many vaccines, too soon, many of which are toxic". The rally was criticized by David Gorski, an American surgical oncologist on Science-Based Medicine blog, for being anti-vaccine and not "pro-safe vaccine", and by Steven Parker on the WebMD website for being "irresponsible".

In 2009, the couple appeared on Larry King Live to discuss autism. Carrey stated that he believes autism "is preventable and treatable," and that "it's still shocking to see how many people are ignoring this information." Carrey suggested rising autism rates was a warning about the medical industry, stating: "There's an autistic child on every block ... Autism is the canary in the coal mine. I believe that it's telling us that this vaccine program is imbalanced."

On July 1, 2015, after the signing of a new vaccination law, Carrey called California governor Jerry Brown a "corporate fascist" who was "poisoning" children by enacting the vaccination requirements. The law disallowed religious and philosophical reasons for exemption from vaccination. Carrey was criticized for being "ignorant when it comes to vaccines" by Arthur Caplan, head of the Division of Medical Ethics at New York University, and by Jeffrey Kluger, senior writer at Time, who described his anti-vaccination statements as "angry, dense and immune to reason".

=== Political and spiritual views ===
Carrey is an outspoken advocate of the "law of attraction". In an interview with Oprah Winfrey on February 17, 1997, he revealed that as a struggling actor he would use visualization techniques to get work. He also stated that he visualized a $10 million check given to him for "acting services rendered", placed the check in his pocket, and seven years later received a $10 million check for his role in Dumb and Dumber. Carrey practices Transcendental Meditation.

Carrey appeared alongside Eckhart Tolle at an event in 2009. He shared that through studying Tolle's teachings, he had a spiritual experience: "I was no longer a fragment of the universe. I was the universe." He also paid tribute to Tolle by impersonating him.

Carrey has also advocated for socialism and has urged the Democratic Party to embrace the movement, saying: "We have to say yes to socialism, to the word and everything. We have to stop apologizing".

In a 2004 interview with 60 Minutes, Carrey reportedly said, "I'm a Buddhist, I'm a Muslim, I'm a Christian." In June 2017, Carrey delivered a speech at a Homeboy Industries event, where he said, "I want to speak to the fact that I believe that this room is filled with God, and that you are heroes to me and I admire you." He also said, "You've made the decision to walk through the gate of forgiveness, of grace, just as Christ did on the cross."

=== Artwork ===
In 2011, he exhibited the painting Nothing to See Here in an art show in Palm Springs at the Heather James Fine Art Gallery. In 2017, Carrey released I Needed Color, a six-minute documentary that showed him working in his studio. Carrey has shared his own political cartoon drawings since August 2017, including controversial renderings of president Donald Trump, and then-White House press secretary Sarah Huckabee Sanders. In 2018, Carrey's artwork was displayed at the Outsider Art Fair, leading to discussion as to whether or not a Hollywood actor could qualify as an outsider artist. He sparked an international event on March 31, 2019, posting a drawing criticizing fascism by depicting Benito Mussolini's infamous death with Clara Petacci; this irked Mussolini's granddaughter Alessandra, who chided him on Twitter, calling him "a bastard" and his artworks "dirty paper". His drawing repertoire culminated in an exhibition titled IndigNation, which opened on October 23, 2018, at the Maccarone Gallery in Los Angeles and featured 108 pen-and-ink drawings from Carrey's Twitter feed from 2016 to 2018. In February 2021, Carrey announced he would discontinue political cartoons.

== Discography ==
=== Singles ===
- "Ace Is in the House" with Tone Loc (1994)
- "Cuban Pete" (1995) – AUS No. 88, UK No. 31
- "Somebody to Love" (1996) – AUS No. 62
- "Cold Dead Hand" (2013) (as Lonesome Earl and the Clutterbusters)

=== Other ===
- George Martin – "I Am the Walrus" (1998)
- The Weeknd – "Dawn FM", "Out of Time" and "Phantom Regret by Jim" (2022)

== Written works ==
=== Books ===
- Carrey, Jim (2013). How Roland Rolls. Illustrated by Rob Nason. Some Kind of Garden Media. ISBN 978-0-9893680-0-1.
- Carrey, Jim; Vachon, Dana (2020). Memoirs and Misinformation. Knopf. ISBN 9780525655978.

=== Forewords ===
- Carrey, Jim (2004). Foreword. It's Not Easy Bein' Me: A Lifetime of No Respect but Plenty of Sex and Drugs. By Dangerfield, Rodney. HarperCollins. ISBN 978-0-06-621107-7.
