= Bruce Almighty =

2003 film by Tom Shadyac

- Theatrical release poster
- Directed by: Tom Shadyac
- Screenplay by: Steve Koren; Mark O'Keefe; Steve Oedekerk
- Story by: Steve Koren; Mark O'Keefe
- Produced by: Tom Shadyac; Jim Carrey; James D. Brubaker; Michael Bostick; Steve Koren; Mark O'Keefe
- Starring: Jim Carrey; Morgan Freeman; Jennifer Aniston; Philip Baker Hall
- Cinematography: Dean Semler
- Edited by: Scott Hill
- Music by: John Debney
- Production companies: Universal Pictures; Spyglass Entertainment; Shady Acres Entertainment; The Pitbull Company
- Distributed by: Universal Pictures (United States and Canada); Spyglass International (select territories) (Note: United International Pictures theatrically released the film in Japan on behalf of Spyglass.); Buena Vista International (International)
- Release dates: May 14, 2003 (Hollywood); May 23, 2003 (United States)
- Running time: 101 minutes
- Country: United States
- Language: English
- Budget: $81 million
- Box office: $485 million

Bruce Almighty is a 2003 American supernatural comedy film starring Jim Carrey. The film follows Bruce Nolan, a down-on-his-luck television reporter who accuses God (played by Morgan Freeman) of not doing his job correctly and is offered the chance to try being God himself for one week. The film was directed by Tom Shadyac and written by Steve Koren, Mark O'Keefe and Steve Oedekerk. Jennifer Aniston, Steve Carell, Philip Baker Hall and Catherine Bell also star. The film is Shadyac and Carrey's third collaboration, after Ace Ventura: Pet Detective (1994) and Liar Liar (1997).

When released in American theaters on May 23, 2003 by Universal Pictures, Bruce Almighty received mixed reviews from critics but was a box-office success and grossed $86.4 million in its opening weekend, a Memorial Day record at the time. The film surprised the industry's pundits when it beat The Matrix Reloaded the following weekend. It went on to gross $485 million worldwide, becoming the fifth-highest-grossing film of 2003, and the highest grossing faith-based film at the time of its release before being surpassed by The Passion of the Christ (2004).

Evan Almighty – a spin-off sequel focusing on Steve Carell's character, with Shadyac and Oedekerk returning to direct and write, respectively, and Freeman also reprising his role – was released on June 22, 2007.

== Plot ==
Bruce Nolan is a television field reporter for Eyewitness News on WKBW-TV in Buffalo, New York, who wants to move on from his field reporting job and become an anchorman. He is sent on assignment in Niagara Falls where he learns that his rival, Evan Baxter, has been promoted to anchorman. An infuriated Bruce loses his temper and goes into a vulgar on-camera outburst resulting with his dismissal from his job. After being dismissed from his job, Bruce accuses God of not doing his job correctly. He receives a pager message, leading him to a warehouse where he meets God in human form. God gives Bruce his powers, to test him. He cannot tell others he has them, nor can he use the powers against others' free will. Bruce is initially jubilant using the powers for personal gain, such as regaining his previous job and impressing his girlfriend, Grace Connelly.

Bruce uses his powers to cause miraculous events which he subsequently reports on, such as discovering Jimmy Hoffa's body during a segment on police training and causing a meteorite to harmlessly land near a cook-off, earning him the nickname "Mr. Exclusive". He makes the Buffalo Sabres win the Stanley Cup and causes Evan to get fired by embarrassing himself on-air, so that Bruce is appointed as the new anchor. Bruce hears voices in his head and God explains that the voices are prayers that Bruce must deal with. Bruce creates an email system to receive the prayers and respond, but there are too many, so he sets the program to answer every prayer Yes automatically.

Bruce attends a party to celebrate his promotion. When Grace arrives, she finds Bruce being kissed by his co-anchor, Susan Ortega, who forced herself on him, and leaves. Bruce tries to use his powers to convince Grace to stay, but cannot influence her free will. He realizes that Buffalo has fallen into chaos due to his actions: some believe the Apocalypse is imminent due to the meteor strikes, while a large number of people, all having prayed to win the lottery and received a small amount like $17 in return, have started rioting everywhere. Bruce returns to God, who explains that he cannot solve all the problems and Bruce must figure out a way. Bruce then starts to help others without using his powers, including having Evan reinstated as anchorman. When Debbie, Grace's sister, visits Bruce's apartment to collect her belongings, she tells him that Grace frequently prays for him. He returns to his computer at home and views Grace's numerous prayers involving Bruce, wishing for his success and well-being. As Bruce reads them, another arrives, wishing not to be in love with him any more.

Bruce walks alone on a highway, asking God to take back his powers and leaving his fate in his hands. He is hit by a truck and regains consciousness in a white void, apparently dead. God appears and asks Bruce what he really wants; Bruce only wants to make sure Grace finds a man who will make her happy. God agrees, and Bruce awakes on the roadside, undergoing defibrillation. Grace visits him in the hospital and they apologize and reconcile. Following his full recovery, Bruce returns to his field reporting job, announcing his engagement to Grace, coming to terms of not getting the job he thought he worked hard to get, and deciding to take pleasure in the simple news stories in Buffalo. The film ends with a close-up on a homeless man who reveals himself to be God, and then claps off the film.

== Cast ==
- Jim Carrey as Bruce Nolan, the news reporter of Eyewitness News
- Morgan Freeman as God
- Jennifer Aniston as Grace Connelly, Bruce's girlfriend
- Philip Baker Hall as Jack Baylor, Bruce's boss at the Eyewitness News
- Catherine Bell as Susan Ortega, Bruce's co-anchor of Eyewitness News
- Lisa Ann Walter as Debbie Connelly, Grace's older sister
- Steve Carell (credited as Steven Carell) as Evan Baxter, Bruce's rival of Eyewitness News
- Nora Dunn as Ally Loman
- Eddie Jemison as Bobby
- Sally Kirkland as Anita Mann
- Mark Kiely as Fred Donohue, the sports reporter of Eyewitness News
- Paul Satterfield as Dallas Coleman, the weatherman of Eyewitness News
- Lou Felder as Pete Fineman, Eyewitness News veteran anchorman
- Micah Stephen Williams as boy on bike
- Tony Bennett as himself
- Carlos Sánchez as Juan Valdez
- John Murphy as himself
- Madeline Lovejoy as Zoe
- Noel Gugliemi as Hood
- Annie Wersching as woman at party

== Production ==
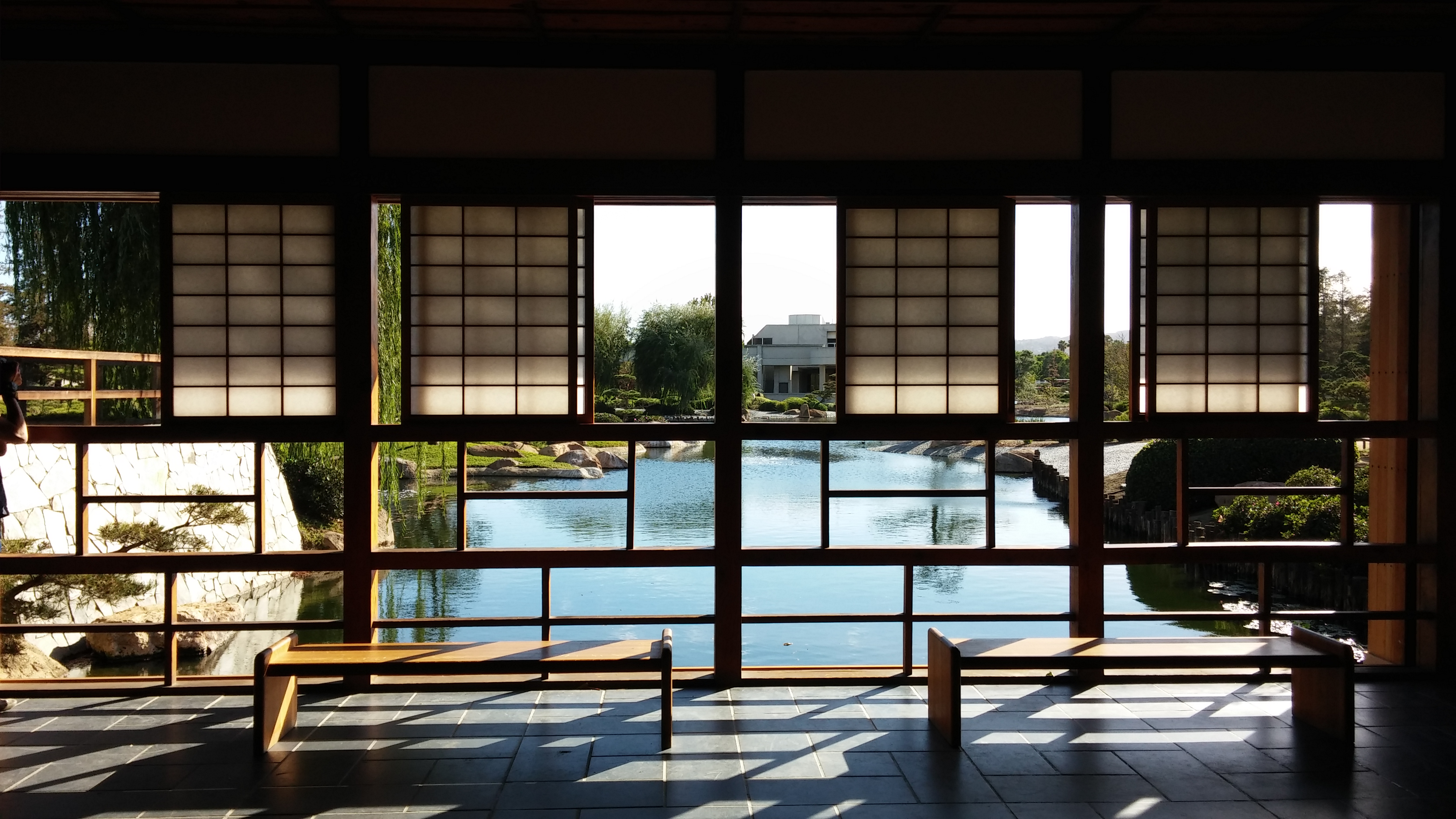
The Shoin building at the Japanese Garden in Los Angeles was used as the spa.

In June 2000, it was announced that Universal Pictures had paid over $1 million for a spec script titled Bruce Almighty with the intention of positioning the script as a directing vehicle for Tom Shadyac via his Universal-based production company Shady Acres. Jim Carrey signed on to star in March 2002 with Steve Oedekerk rewriting the script. Previously, Carrey had been slated to star in another comedy for Universal titled Dog Years to be directed by Gary Ross, but following that film's cancellation, Universal was eager to get Carrey onto another project.

Filming of Buffalo was done in the "New York Street" at Universal Studios Lot. The restaurant with Tony Bennett was filmed at Cicada, in the James Oviatt Building, in downtown Los Angeles. The spa scene with Jennifer Aniston was filmed in the Shoin building at The Japanese Garden in Los Angeles.

== Release ==
Bruce Almighty was released on May 23, 2003, by Universal Pictures. Universal handled distribution in the United States and Canada (although they were originally planned to distribute the film worldwide), while Spyglass Entertainment handled sales rights internationally. Buena Vista International acquired distribution rights in a majority of regions except in Scandinavia, Portugal, Japan and the CIS, where it was handled by distributors who already held deals with Spyglass in those respective territories. United International Pictures and Pony Canyon respectively handled theatrical and home video rights in Japan, while Svensk Filmindustri handled Scandinavian distribution through subsidiaries AB Svensk Filmindustri in Sweden, SF Film A/S in Denmark and FS Film Oy in Finland.

=== Home media ===
Bruce Almighty was released on DVD and VHS on November 25, 2003, by Universal Studios Home Video. The DVD version features separate widescreen and fullscreen versions, along with Dolby Digital and DTS audio tracks. It was later released on Blu-ray.

== Reception ==
=== Box office ===
Bruce Almighty earned $67.9 million during its opening weekend, which made it the highest for a Jim Carrey film, surpassing How the Grinch Stole Christmas. This record would be held until the opening of Sonic the Hedgehog 2 in 2022. At the time, it was one of the three Universal films of 2003 to make opening weekends of $50 million, joining 2 Fast 2 Furious and Hulk. In its first four days, the film generated a total of $86.4 million, becoming the second-highest Memorial Day weekend debut, behind The Lost World: Jurassic Park. It opened in the number one spot at the box office, beating The Matrix Reloaded. The film would be dethroned by Finding Nemo in its second weekend, declining by 45.1% and making $37.3 million.

The film was released in the United Kingdom on June 27, 2003, and topped the country's box office that weekend. There, it made a total of $8.3 million, beating Batman Forever to have the highest opening weekend for a Jim Carrey film in the country.

Bruce Almighty joined The Matrix Reloaded, Finding Nemo, X2 and Pirates of the Caribbean: The Curse of the Black Pearl to become the first five films to earn over $200 million at the box office in one summer season. By the end of its theatrical run, the film had made $242 million domestically and a total $484 million worldwide, making it Aniston and Carrey's highest-grossing film worldwide, as well as the fifth-highest-grossing film of 2003. It continued to be Carrey's highest-grossing film worldwide until March 2025 when Sonic the Hedgehog 3 surpassed it.

=== Critical response ===
On Rotten Tomatoes, the film has an approval rating of 48% based on 191 reviews, with an average rating of 5.7/10. The site's critical consensus reads, "Carrey is hilarious in the slapstick scenes, but Bruce Almighty gets bogged down in treacle." On Metacritic, it has a weighted average score of 46 out of 100, based on 35 critics, indicating "mixed or average" reviews. Audiences surveyed by CinemaScore gave the film an average grade of "A" on an A+ to F scale.

Roger Ebert of the Chicago Sun-Times gave the film three out of four stars, calling it: "A charmer, the kind of movie where Bruce learns that while he may not ever make a very good God, the experience may indeed make him a better television newsman." Ebert praised Aniston's performance: "Aniston, as a sweet kindergarten teacher and fiancée, shows again (after The Good Girl) that she really will have a movie career." Variety's Robert Koehler gave the film a mixed review: "There's remarkably little done with a premise snatched from high-concept heaven, adding yet another file to the growing cabinet of under-realized comedies." The Los Angeles Times gave it a negative review and called it "not so mighty".

Chuck Rudolph of Slant Magazine said, "In several ways, the movie is an apathetic revision of The Truman Show, with Carrey starring as both Truman and Christof." Laura Clifford of Reeling Reviews gave the film a "B−" and wrote, "After playing the ideal CIA chief in The Sum of All Fears and president in Deep Impact, Morgan Freeman can add God to the list of positions he seems tailor made for."

=== Controversies ===
The film was banned in Egypt, Saudi Arabia, Iran, Kuwait and Qatar because of its portrayal of God as an ordinary man and it being blasphemous to Islam. Bans in both Malaysia and Egypt were eventually lifted after the nations' censorship boards gave the film their highest rating (18-PL in the case of Malaysia).

As God contacts Bruce using an actual phone number rather than one in the standard fictional 555 telephone exchange, several people and groups sharing this number received hundreds of phone calls from people wanting to talk to God, including a church in North Carolina, US (where the minister was named Bruce), a Florida woman who threatened to sue Universal Pictures, a pastor in northern Wisconsin and a man running a sandwich shop in Manchester, England. The producers noted that the number (776–2323) was not in use in the area code (716, which was never specified on screen) in the film's story, but did not check anywhere else. For the home video and television versions of the film, the number was changed to the fictional 555–0123.

== Accolades ==
Association	Category	Nominee	Results
ASCAP Film and Television Music Awards	Top Box Office Films	John Debney	Won
ASCAP Film and Television Music Awards	Most Performed Song from a Motion Picture "I'm With You"	Graham Edwards; Avril Lavigne	Won
BET Comedy Awards	Outstanding Supporting Actor in a Box Office Movie	Morgan Freeman	Nominated
Black Reel Awards	Film: Best Supporting Actor	Morgan Freeman	Nominated
JoBlo.com Golden Schmoes Awards	Most Overrated Movie of the Year		Nominated
NAACP Image Awards	Outstanding Supporting Actor in a Motion Picture	Morgan Freeman	Won
MTV Movie & TV Awards	Best Comedic Performance	Jim Carrey	Nominated
MTV Movie & TV Awards	Best Kiss	Jim Carrey; Jennifer Aniston	Nominated
MTV Movie Awards Mexico	Most Divine Miracle in a Movie (for the chest of Grace)	Jim Carrey	Won
Nickelodeon Kids' Choice Awards	Favorite Movie		Nominated
Nickelodeon Kids' Choice Awards	Favorite Movie Actor	Jim Carrey	Won
People's Choice Awards	Favorite Comedy Motion Picture		Won
Teen Choice Awards	Choice Movie Actor – Comedy	Jim Carrey	Won
Teen Choice Awards	Choice Movie Actress – Comedy	Jennifer Aniston	Nominated
Teen Choice Awards	Choice Movie – Chemistry	Jim Carrey; Morgan Freeman	Nominated

== Soundtrack ==
Bruce Almighty: Original Motion Picture Soundtrack

Soundtrack album by John Debney, Various Artists
- Released: June 3, 2003
- Genre: Soundtrack
- Label: Varèse Sarabande

Professional ratings
Review scores
Source	Rating
AllMusic	3/5 stars

The soundtrack was released on June 3, 2003, by Varèse Sarabande. Tracks 8–13 are from the score composed by John Debney, performed by the Hollywood Studio Symphony (conducted by Pete Anthony) with Brad Dechter and Sandy De Crescent.

Track listing

1. "One of Us" – Joan Osborne
2. "God Shaped Hole" – Plumb
3. "You're a God" – Vertical Horizon
4. "The Power" – Snap!
5. "A Little Less Conversation" – Elvis vs. JXL
6. "The Rockafeller Skank" – Fatboy Slim
7. "God Gave Me Everything" – Mick Jagger featuring Lenny Kravitz
8. "If I Ruled the World" – Tony Bennett
9. "AB Positive"
10. "Walking on Water"
11. "Seventh at Seven"
12. "Bruce Meets God"
13. "Bruce's Prayer"
14. "Grace's Prayer"

== Related media ==
=== Unauthorized remakes ===
- Three Indian films inspired by this film were released in 2008 without giving credit to the original:
  - Krishnarjuna (Telugu)
  - Arai En 305-il Kadavul (Tamil)
  - God Tussi Great Ho (Hindi)

=== Sequel ===
A sequel and spin-off, titled Evan Almighty, was released on June 22, 2007, with Steve Carell reprising his role as Evan Baxter and Morgan Freeman returning to his role as God. Although Shadyac returned to direct the sequel, neither Carrey nor Aniston were involved with the film, and Carrey's character, Bruce, is never mentioned in the film. The film was a critical and commercial failure.

Before Evan Almighty materialized, screenwriters Steve Koren and Mark O'Keefe envisioned a sequel with the title Brucifer. The proposed sequel involved Aniston's character dying and Carrey's character, under the weight of his grief, takes on Satan's powers, which he uses to resurrect Aniston's character.
