= The Mask (franchise) =

Media franchise based on Dark Horse comic series

- Official franchise logo
- Created by: Michael Fallon; Mark Verheiden
- Original work: Dark Horse Presents #10 (September 1987)
- Owners: Dark Horse Comics; Films and TV series: Warner Bros. Entertainment
- Years: 1987–present

Films and television
- Film(s): The Mask (1994); Son of the Mask (2005)
- Animated series: The Mask: Animated Series

Games
- Video game(s): The Mask (1994)

The Mask is an American media franchise based on the comic book series of the same name published by Dark Horse Comics. The franchise revolves around a mysterious mask that grants its wearers cartoonish, god-like superpowers. Those who use the mask are ultimately faced with the consequences of the chaos and conflicts created by its influence.

The first film, The Mask, was released in 1994, followed by the stand-alone sequel Son of the Mask in 2005. An animated television series, The Mask: Animated Series, was also produced and ran for three seasons. While the first film was a major commercial and critical success, the sequel was critically panned and performed poorly at the box office.

== Background ==
In 1989, Mike Richardson and Todd Moyer, respectively the founder and Executive Vice President of Dark Horse Comics, first approached New Line Cinema about adapting the comic series The Mask into a film, after having seen other offers. The main character went through several transformations, and the project was stalled a couple of times.

With New Line Cinema initially intending for The Mask to start a new horror franchise, the company offered the job of directing the film to Charles Russell, known for directing such films. Russell found the violence of the comic to be off-putting, and wanted the film to be less grim and more fun than the source material, adapting the prologue of the 1991 The Mask series with serial killer Stan "Big Head" Ipkiss instead characterised as the heroic Stanley Ipkiss, with the main protagonist Mitch Kellaway then given a supporting role in-adaptation.

== Films ==
Film	U.S. release date	Director(s)	Screenwriter(s)	Story by	Producer(s)
The Mask	July 29, 1994	Chuck Russell	Mike Werb	Michael Fallon and Mark Verheiden	Bob Engelman
Son of the Mask	February 18, 2005	Lawrence Guterman	Lance Khazei	Lance Khazei	Erica Huggins and Scott Kroopf

=== The Mask (1994) ===
Unfortunate bank clerk Stanley Ipkiss (Jim Carrey) finds a magical mask that transforms him into a mischievous, good-hearted gangster with cartoon-like superpowers.

=== Son of the Mask (2005) ===
After Loki (Alan Cumming) is dispatched to Earth to retrieve the Mask, cartoonist Tim Avery (Jamie Kennedy) inadvertently uses it to conceive a child, who inherits its powers.

=== Possible third film ===
On the possibility of a direct sequel to the 1994 film with Carrey reprising the role of Stanley Ipkiss and Diaz as Tina Carlyle, Mike Richardson said in a 2014 interview: "We've been talking about reviving The Mask, both in film and in comics. We've had a couple of false starts". In December 2024, Carrey revealed that he was still interested in portraying the Mask in a sequel as long as the idea is good. In January 2025, Diaz also expressed interest in returning "if Jim's on board". In June 2026, Chuck Russell said, "A sequel to The Mask is always something I'm asked about. It'd be lovely to return, but for me with Jim in particular, it would be lovely to return, but we'll see. It's not ready yet, but that's a lovely idea." A month later, however, he would die at his home in the San Diego Area, at the age of 74, leaving the status of the sequel unknown.

=== Possible reboot ===
In 2026, Sébastien Vaniček expressed interest in directing a new adaptation that was darker and more violent, staying closer in tone to the original comics.

== Television ==
Series	Season	Episodes	First released	Last released	Showrunner(s)	Network(s)
The Mask: Animated Series	3	54	August 12, 1995	August 30, 1997	Duane Capizzi	CBS

=== The Mask: Animated Series (1995–1997) ===
Stanley Ipkiss (voiced by Rob Paulsen) continues to use the magical mask to fight crime and the supervillains as the mischievous, cartoonish, good-hearted superhero known as the "Mask", while having fun and partying at the same time. In this continuity, Stanley still has the mask. He either pretended to throw it away, or Milo retrieved it from the river. As well, in this series, Stanley can use the mask during both day and night, whereas in the film, it only worked at night.

== Cast and characters ==
Key
- A ^{V} indicates the actor or actress lent only his or her voice for his or her film character.

Character	Films		Animated series		
Character	The Mask	Son of the Mask	The Mask: Animated Series		
Character	The Mask	Son of the Mask	Season 1	Season 2	Season 3
Stanley Ipkiss The Mask	Jim Carrey		Rob Paulsen^{V}	Rob Paulsen^{V}	Rob Paulsen^{V}
Dr. Arthur Neuman	Ben Stein	Ben Stein	Ben Stein^{V}	Ben Stein^{V}	
Milo	Max		Frank Welker^{V}	Frank Welker^{V}	Frank Welker^{V}
Lt. Mitch Kellaway	Peter Riegert		Neil Ross^{V}	Neil Ross^{V}	Neil Ross^{V}
Detective Doyle	Jim Doughan		Jim Cummings^{V}	Jim Cummings^{V}	Jim Cummings^{V}
Charlie Schumaker	Richard Jeni		Mark L. Taylor^{V}	Mark L. Taylor^{V}	Mark L. Taylor^{V}
Peggy Brandt	Amy Yasbeck		Heidi Shannon^{V}	Heidi Shannon^{V}	Heidi Shannon^{V}
Mayor Mitchell "Mortimer" Tilton	Ivory Ocean		Kevin Michael Richardson^{V}	Kevin Michael Richardson^{V}	Kevin Michael Richardson^{V}
Agnes Peenman	Nancy Fish		Tress MacNeille^{V}	Tress MacNeille^{V}	Tress MacNeille^{V}
Tina Carlyle	Cameron Diaz				
Dorian Tyrell The Evil Mask	Peter Greene				
Niko	Orestes Matacena				
Loki God of Mischief	Mentioned	Alan Cumming			
Tim Avery The Mask		Jamie Kennedy			
Alvey Avery Son of the Mask		Ryan and Liam Falconer			
Alvey Avery Son of the Mask		Joyce Kurtz^{V}			
Alvey Avery Son of the Mask		Mona Marshall^{V}			
Alvey Avery Son of the Mask		Mary Matilyn Mouser^{V}			
Alvey Avery Son of the Mask		Neil Ross^{V}			
Otis		Bear			
Otis		Bill Farmer^{V}			
Otis		Richard Steven Horvitz^{V}			
Tonya Avery		Traylor Howard			
Odin		Bob Hoskins			
Daniel Moss		Steven Wright			
Jorge		Kal Penn			
Chad		Ryan Johnson			
Betty		Magda Szubanski			
Doctor Septimus Pretorius			Tim Curry	Tim Curry	Tim Curry

== Additional crew and production details ==
Film	Crew/Detail					
Film	Composer(s)	Cinematographer	Editor(s)	Production companies	Distributing company	Running time
The Mask	Randy Edelman	John R. Leonetti	Arthur Coburn	New Line Productions; AFI Catalog of Feature Films; Dark Horse Entertainment	New Line Cinema	101 minutes
Son of the Mask	Randy Edelman	Greg Gardiner	Malcolm Campbell, John Coniglio and Debra Neil Fisher	Radar Pictures; Dark Horse Entertainment	New Line Cinema (United States); Warner Bros. Pictures (Germany)	94 minutes

== Audio ==
An audio adaptation of I Pledge Allegiance to the Mask, produced by American audiobook company GraphicAudio, was released on 13 September 2021.

== Miscellaneous ==
A CD-Rom providing a motion comic adaptation of the first five issues of the original comic was released in 1994, entitled The Mask: The Origin.

== Video games ==
A side-scrolling action game based on the first film was released for the Super Nintendo Entertainment System in 1995. A game based on Son of the Mask was released for mobile phones in 2005.
