= Cedars Bowler Hat =

Outdoor sculpture in Dallas, Texas, U.S.

Bowler Hat
- Artist: Keith Turman
- Year: 2013
- Type: Outdoor sculpture
- Medium: Steel, wood, fiberglass, epoxy, foam
- Subject: Bowler hat
- Location: Dallas, Texas, United States; 32.773289°N 96.792944°W

Bowler Hat (sometimes called the Cedars Bowler Hat) is an outdoor sculpture by artist Keith Turman in the Cedars neighborhood of Dallas, Texas, United States. The oversized hat was commissioned for a Timothy Oulton furniture store but, following permission issues, was instead installed in 2013 as a freestanding roadside landmark along the 1500 block of Griffin Street.

== History ==
The piece was created by Turman for the Timothy Oulton store at Central Expressway and Knox Street as a three-dimensional version of the brand's bowler-hat logo. When the plan to mount it on the store did not receive approval, the sculpture was moved to the Cedars and raised on a steel column near the junction of Interstates 30 and 45. In local reporting ahead of installation, it was described as weighing about two tons and topping a roughly 30-foot column. A 2018 article in The Dallas Morning News noted the hat as a recognizable Cedars landmark, a short walk from a large umbrella sculpture installed the same year.

== Description ==
Accounts describe the hat as approximately 20 ft (6.1 m) wide; the hat element itself has been reported around 10 ft (3.0 m) tall, with the overall installation reaching about 30 ft (9.1 m) when mounted. It is constructed from steel, wood, fiberglass, epoxy, and foam.

== Location ==
The work stands on the west side of Griffin Street between Browder and South Ervay Streets on the south edge of downtown Dallas.

== See also ==
- Public art in Dallas
- The Traveling Man
- Eye (sculpture)
