= Jackie Ferrara =

American sculptor and draftswoman (1929–2025)

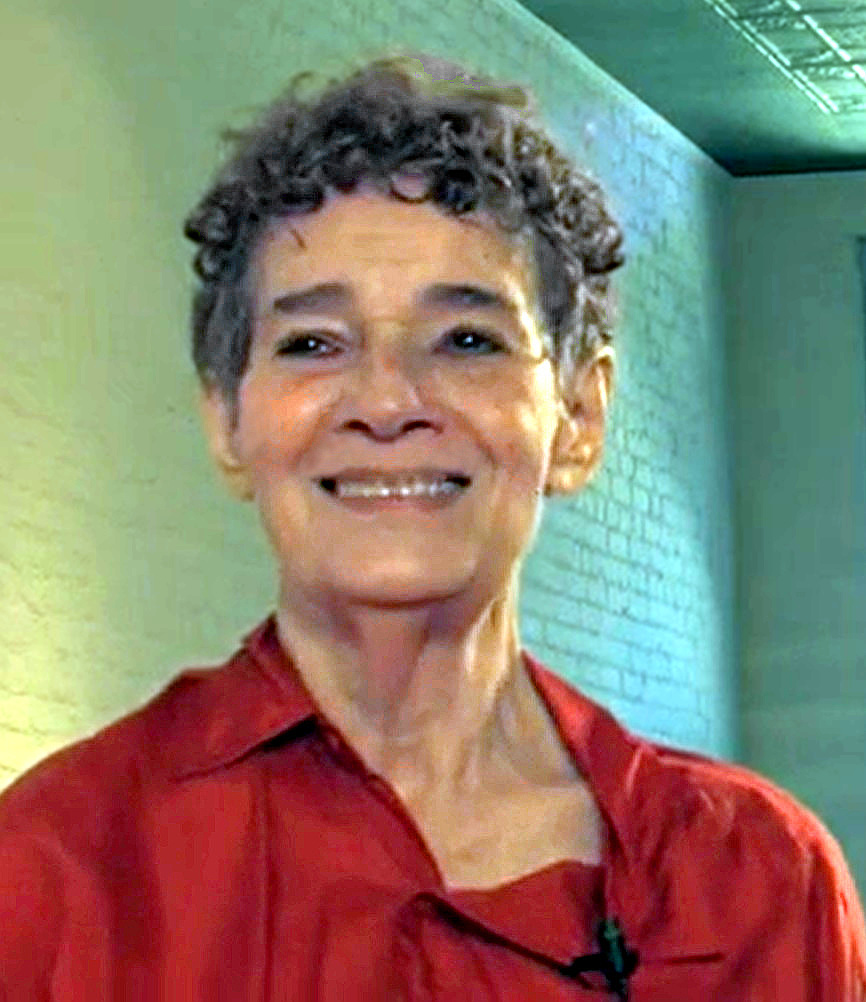
- Ferrara in 2012
- Born: Jacqueline Hirschhorn; November 17, 1929; Detroit, Michigan, U.S.
- Died: October 22, 2025 (aged 95); Basel, Switzerland
- Education: Michigan State University
- Known for: Sculpture
- Movement: Postminimalism
- Website: Official website

Jacqueline Ferrara (née Hirschhorn; November 17, 1929 – October 22, 2025) was an American sculptor and draftswoman best known for her pyramidal stacked structures. Her work is in the collections of the Museum of Modern Art, the Los Angeles County Museum of Art, the Louisiana Museum of Modern Art, The Phillips Collection, and the Rose Art Museum at Brandeis University, among others. On July 6, 1980, writing in The New York Times, the critic Peter Schjeldahl referred to her as "one of our most gifted and innovative sculptors."

== Early life and career ==
Ferrara was born in Detroit, Michigan, on November 17, 1929, to Herman Hirshhorn and Diana (Ufberg) Hirschhorn. She took art classes at the Detroit Institute of Arts, but said she didn't "have that drawing gift at all." She studied at Michigan State University for six months in 1950, but otherwise had little formal arts education. She moved to New York City in 1952 and became involved in the city's burgeoning art scene. She worked temporarily for the Henry Street Playhouse, and there became involved with theater and dance. During the 1960s, Ferrara was involved with performances and happenings at the Judson Memorial Church. She performed in two of Claes Oldenburg's happenings. In 1973, she worked on the scenic design for Tom Eyen's White Whore and the Bit Player, which was directed by Manuel Martín Jr. as a bilingual production (Spanish and English) at La MaMa Experimental Theatre Club. The production featured performances by Candy Darling (in the English-language version) and Magaly Alabau (in the Spanish-language version).

During this time she began sculpting, initially "having affinities with Minimalist sculpture" then developing her own style by the 1970s. Between the late 1950s and early 1970s, Ferrara's sculptures "included wax figures in groups, constructed boxes with macabre contents, and hanging pieces, such as tail-like objects of jute and canvas panels covered with cotton batting and hung in rows." Ferrara had solo exhibitions in New York in 1973 and 1974, and established her major sculptural direction:

A177 XF 1 3/4 – XS 5/8 – V, A 1 1/4 – V, A 1 (1977), M128 CRA Pyramid (1974), and A188 Pylon (1978) at The Phillips Collection in 2022

The show of 1973 presented mainly layered, simplified sculptures—cubic or resembling stairs, obelisks or pyramids. The scale ranged from 0.6 to nearly 2.7 metres in height; the modular units of the works were made of wood or cardboard and covered with cotton batting. In the subsequent show Ferrara used only bare wood (nailed or glued) and thereby achieved greater clarity over all, technical precision and a stronger sense of mathematical order with her unitary sequences. The works were "pyramids" of various types, with stepped walls, truncated tops and sometimes curved sides, as in B Pyramid (1974; Sol LeWitt Collection, on loan to Wadsworth Atheneum, Hartford, Connecticut). Although they evoke ancient pyramids, Ferrara conceived of her sculptures as abstractions and not as models of architectural structures.

Characteristics of Ferrara's work include wooden pyramid or ziggurat structures with accompanying horizontally stacked steps, "meticulous craftsmanship ... reference to generic types of non-Western building, such as those of Mesoamerica and Egypt, and to geometric form." She further experimented with cutting away sections and moved away from having four identical sides on her pyramids. Some of Ferrara's exhibitions included her graph paper drawings, "testifying to her methods of elaboration." One of her earliest mature works was 1974's "Hollow Core Pyramid".

Other well-known works of the period include "Curved Pyramid" and "Stacked Pyramid", both 1973. In the 1980s, Ferarra began working on a smaller scale, producing plywood works she called "wallyards" or "courtyards" that looked like models rather than finished sculptures. She added complexity to these works by combining multiple kinds of wood in a single work and experimenting with different stains:

Looking like models that could serve as the basis for large-scale outdoor works, these pieces have rectangular decks, flanked by one or more walls; they also sometimes include stairways and geometric motifs that mirror others on the opposing plane. After often choosing two shades of plywood for the wallyards, Ferrara in 1982 started using stains, which she limited to black, red and yellow and diluted so as to leave the grain of the wood visible. Colour allowed for more complicated patterning and geometry, as in Wall Set/Yellow (1983; Steven Goldberg collection, New York). Like many works by Ferrara from this and other periods, this sculpture derives some of its complexity from being composed of more than one type of wood (pine and poplar).

Another series of small works, which Ferrara referred to as "places", grew out of these works. Many look like small-scale models of temples, yet defy "specific historical dating ... seeming simultaneously ancient, modern and even futuristic in some cases".

From the 1980s forward, Ferrara's work shifted to commissions for outdoor settings. Her "public environments" in the 1980s and 1990s "deal primarily with surface—floor areas, walkways and platforms—and the arrangement of geometric patterns ... Ferrara favoured the use of tiles (granite, slate and terracotta, for example) to compose such elements as chequerwork, triangle and bands of various sizes that traverse space in sometimes unpredictable directions."

== Personal life and death ==
Ferrara married jazz musician Don Ferrara (remarriage) in 1955; they separated in 1957. Ferrara lived in Tuscany in 1959–1960. Ferrara died by physician-assisted suicide in Basel, Switzerland, on October 22, 2025, at the age of 95.

== Public works ==
Large-scale public works Ferrara created include "Castle Clinton: Tower and Bridge" (1979) and "Meeting Place" (1989), which featured a large "lobby" with concrete and steel flooring, a raised platform with steps, and concrete and steel seating. In 1988, she created the work "Belvedere" at the Minneapolis Sculpture Garden.

Her other public works include the 200 seat "Amphitheater" (1999) at LACMA, the sixty-foot high "Stepped Tower" (2000) at the University of Minnesota, and the 60-foot long red and black granite "Fountain" (2006) at University of Houston.

== Awards and grants ==
- Creative Artists Public Service grants, New York State Council on the Arts, 1971 and 1975
- National Endowment for the Arts grants: 1973, 1977, 1987
- Guggenheim Fellowship, 1975
- Design Excellence Award for Flushing Bay Promenade, Queens, New York City, Art Commission of the City of New York, 1988
- Institute Honor, American Institute of Architects, 1990
- Tucker Award for Design Excellence, 2001
