= Fletcher Benton =

American sculptor and painter (1931–2019)

- Born: Fletcher C. Benton; February 25, 1931; Jackson, Ohio, U.S.
- Died: June 26, 2019 (aged 88); San Francisco, California, U.S.
- Education: Miami University
- Known for: Sculpture, painting
- Spouse(s): Marjorie Ann Fisher, Roberta N. Lee

Fletcher C. Benton (February 25, 1931 – June 26, 2019) was an American sculptor and painter from San Francisco, California. Benton was widely known for his kinetic art as well as his large-scale steel abstract geometric sculptures.

== Life ==
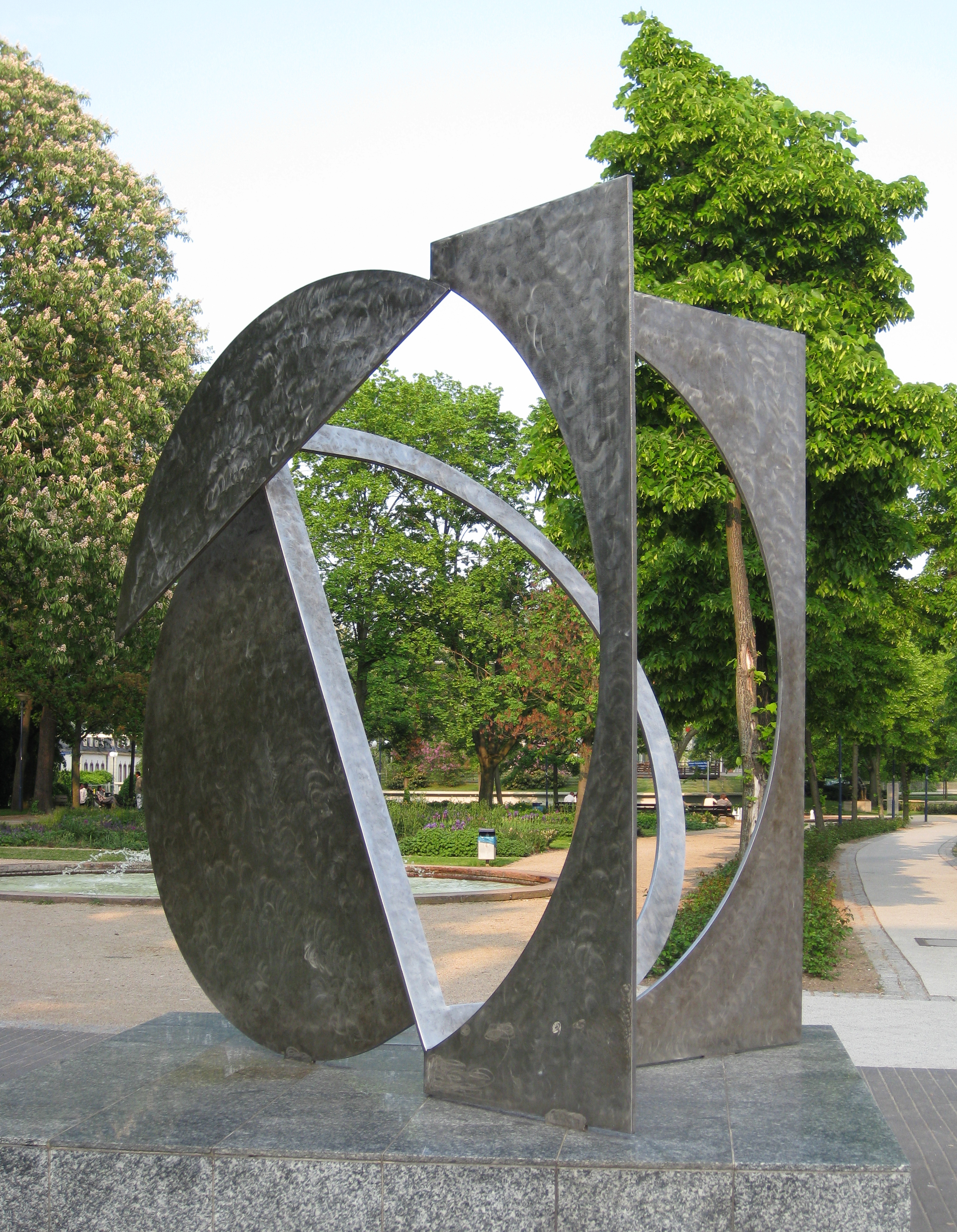
Folded Square D, Offenbach/Germany, 1981

Born in the coal, nugget and iron-producing district of southern Ohio, Benton was a successful sign painter as a youth. After serving in the United States Navy, he graduated from Miami University, Oxford, Ohio with a Bachelor of Fine Arts degree in 1956. Thereafter he moved to San Francisco, and began as an instructor at the California College of Arts and Crafts.He then went to Europe, traveling by his motorcycle through Scandinavia, Holland, Belgium and France; he spent some time in Paris and then in New York and later moved back to San Francisco.

Benton was a part of the Beatnik movement in San Francisco during the ‘50s and ‘60s working as a sign painter by day and an expressionist artist (painting) by night. In 1961, he had a solo exhibition at the California Palace Legion of Honor, showing his portraits of fellow artists like David Simpson and William Morehouse. Frustrated with the limitations of paint on canvas, Benton began to work with movement in geometric pattern pieces and boxes which he was familiar with from his work in commercial signs. This was at the beginning of the kinetic movement; Benton worked largely in isolation, unaware of other efforts of kinetic artists. His early works of this series were exhibited at Gump's Gallery in San Francisco.

In the late 1970s, he abandoned kinetic art, switching to more traditional media for sculpture: bronze and steel.[5] These works are designed to be viewed from all angles and have often been characterized as new constructivism; he worked in this style until his death in 2019. Some of his most popular series in this style are the Folded Square Alphabets and Numericals, Folded Circle, Donuts, and Steel Watercolors.

Benton has large-scale steel sculptures permanently installed world-wide including San Francisco's Louise M. Davies Symphony Hall, Grounds For Sculpture sculpture park in Hamilton, NJ, the city of Cologne, Germany, the city of Berlin, among others.

== Public collections ==
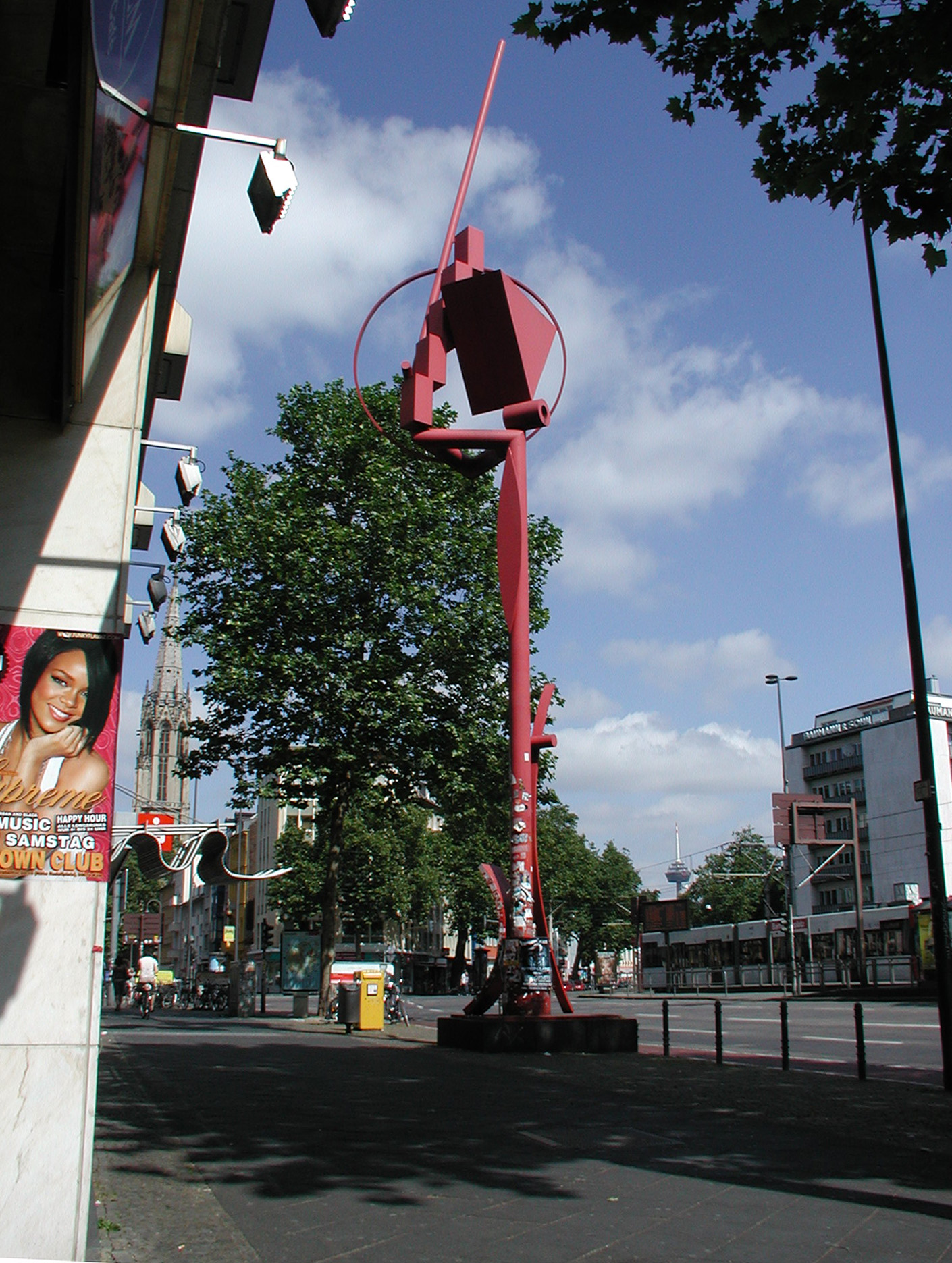
Steel-Watercolor-Triangle-Ring, Cologne/Germany, 1993

His work is included in the collections of the:

- Oakland Museum of California, Oakland, California
- Vanderbilt University, Nashville, Tennessee
- Metropolitan Museum of Art
- Brooklyn Museum
- Hirshhorn Museum and Sculpture Garden
- Whitney Museum of American Art
- Minneapolis Institute of Art
- Grounds For Sculpture
- San Francisco Museum of Modern Art
- Neuberger Museum of Art
- Stanford Museum of Art
- Albright-Knox Art Gallery
- Denver Art Museum
- The Victoria and Albert Museum
- Cedars-Sinai Medical Center, Los Angeles
- Laumeier Sculpture Park
- Klingspor Museum, Offenbach, Germany
- Rockefeller Collection
- Sheldon Museum of Art
- Boulevard Jacqmain corner in Brussels Belgium
- de Saisset Museum, Santa Clara University, Fletcher Benton, Going Around the Corner with X, 2008, painted steel, Gift of the artist with assistance from Paula Kirkeby, in honor of William Rewak, S.J., 2013.4.1.

== Works ==
- Tilted Donut Wedge with Two Balls, Besselpark, Berlin
- Donut No. 3, Laumeier Sculpture Park, St. Louis, Missouri (Replica of Titled Donut Wedge with Two Balls)

== Awards ==
In 2008, Fletcher Benton was a recipient of the International Sculpture Center's Lifetime Achievement in Contemporary Sculpture Award. In 1993 he was awarded an honorary doctorate by Miami University at the Miami University Art Museum. His sculpture Folded Circle Two Squares was the founding piece and one of the signature sculptures of the Miami University's 3 acre Sculpture Park which now features works by Mark di Suvero, Nancy Holt, and others. In 1995, he was awarded an honorary doctorate in humane letters by the University of Rio Grande, located in Gallia County, Ohio.

== Interviews ==
- KQED Spark segment on Fletcher Benton. Original air date: March 2008.
- Karlstrom, Paul. Smithsonian Archives of American Art. Oral history interview with Fletcher Benton, 1989 May 2–4.
- Sonoma Valley Museum of Art presents The Artist’s Studio on YouTube. Original airdate: October, 2010.
- Fletcher Benton, The Kinetic Years on YouTube.
