= Laumeier Sculpture Park =

Open-air museum and sculpture park in Sunset Hills, Missouri

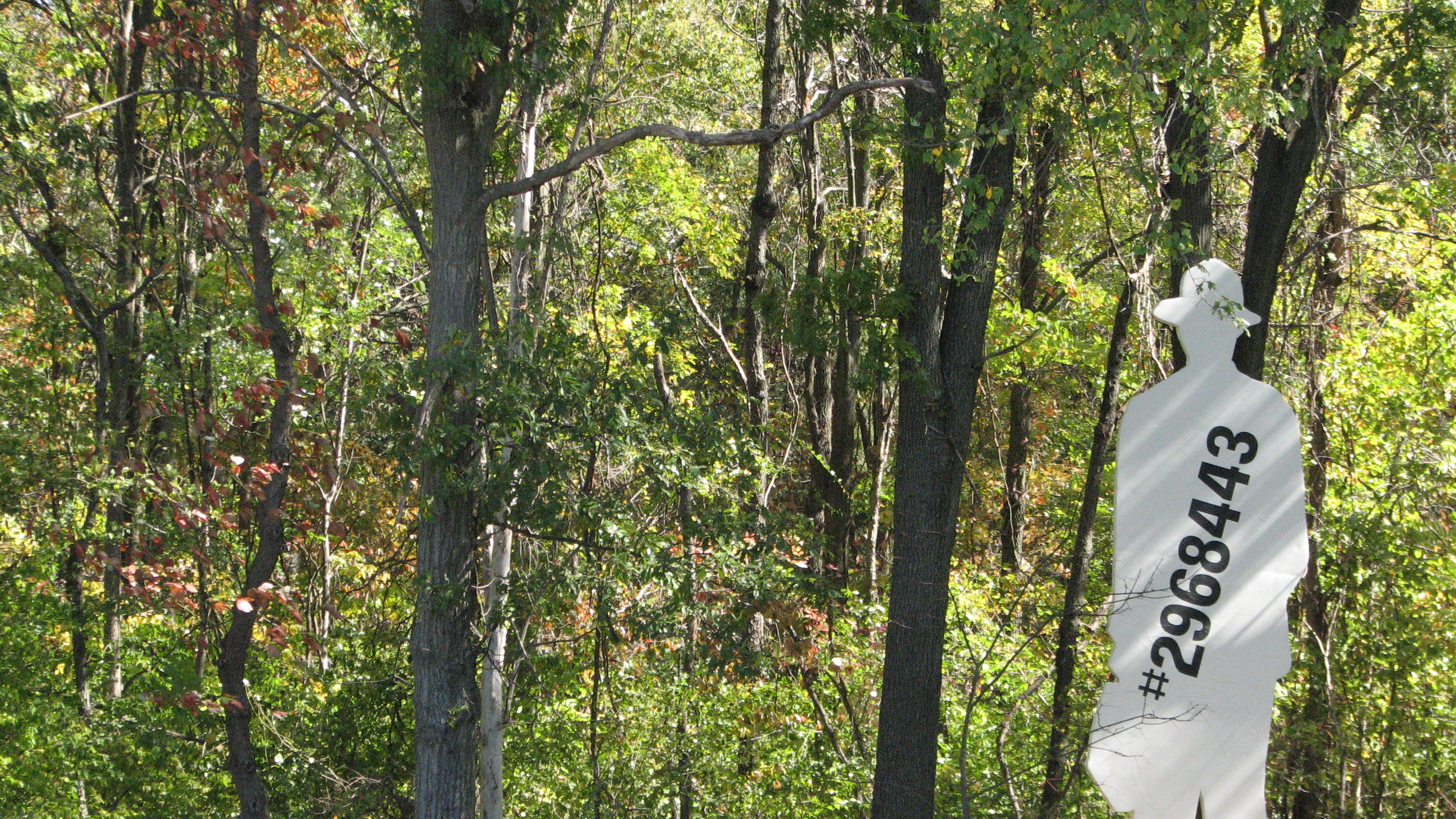
- Jonathan Borofsky's "Man with Briefcase at #2968443" (1986), in the park's eastern woodland
- Interactive map of Laumeier Sculpture Park
- Type: County Park
- Location: 12580 Rott Road, Sunset Hills, Missouri, United States
- Coordinates: 38.551°N 90.412°W
- Area: 105 acres (0.42 km^{2})
- Created: 1975
- Operator: St. Louis County Parks and Recreation Department
- Visitors: Approximately 300,000 per year
- Website: http://www.laumeiersculpturepark.org/

Laumeier Sculpture Park is a 105-acre open-air museum and sculpture park located in Sunset Hills, Missouri, near St. Louis. Laumeier is maintained in partnership with St. Louis County Parks and Recreation Department. It houses over 70 large-scale outdoor sculptures and features a 1.4-mile (2.3 km) walking trail, an indoor gallery, the Aronson Art Center, and educational programs. A 1917 Tudor stone mansion, the former residence of Henry and Matilda Laumeier, is now the Kranzberg Education Lab. Laumeier is accredited by the American Alliance of Museums. The park sees about 300,000 visitors each year and operates on a $1.5 million budget.

== History ==
=== Land ownership ===
The land upon which Laumeier Sculpture Park now stands came to the U.S. through Spanish and French land grants of the 1830s. James C. Sutton, farmer, blacksmith, and inventor of the Sutton Plow, purchased the 143-acre parcel from the U.S. Government in 1835. It was one of two large parcels of land Sutton purchased for farming in the mid-1800s that became part of St. Louis County in Missouri. Sutton’s contribution to St. Louis County lives on today. An image of his plow is seen at the center of the official seal of St. Louis County.

The first unit of the Sutton parcel that became Laumeier Sculpture Park was a tract of 47.67 acres on Rott Road owned by Joseph Griesedieck, the owner of Falstaff Brewing and president of Vahlaus Realty. In September 1916, Griesedieck sold the tract through Valhaus Realty Co. to Roland L. Kahle, a department manager of the Rigen Stove Company. Kahle's grandfather was George August Kahle, one of the founders of the American Stove Company. In 1901, the Rigen Stove Company merged with the Quick Meal Stove Company to form the American Stove Company. Now known as Magic Chef, the company endures today as a well-known maker of cooking stoves and components.

In April 1917, Kahle obtained a building permit for a stone house, adding a stone garage to the property in 1931 and a gatehouse in 1936. Although he listed himself as the owner, builder, and architect, the house was actually designed by Ernst C. Janssen, an architect with a practice of more than sixty years centering around the German-American families of St. Louis’ south side. The mainstay of his practice was brewery architecture, and his characteristic style for residential buildings has been called “Brewer’s Baronial.” Between 1894 and 1911, Janssen designed more than a dozen St. Louis houses, as well as the Grand Boulevard entrance pillars to the Compton Heights subdivision in the City of St. Louis, and the 12,000 square-foot Magic Chef Mansion, built in 1908 for American Stove Company co-founder Charles Stockstrom.

=== Henry and Matilda Laumeier ===
Kahle died in 1938. In 1940, his wife, the former Ada B. Riegel, sold the property to Henry Laumeier. Laumeier married Matilda Cramer in 1941 and recommenced construction to restore and modify the house, including glazing the large south porch and expanding the estate.

After Laumeier’s death in 1959, Wayne C. Kennedy, director of the St. Louis County Department of Parks and recreation, was searching the diminishing areas of rural land for acreages to add to the park system. Laumeier’s nieces urged him to talk with Matilda about her estate, and Kennedy met with her in 1963. Mrs. Laumeier was enthusiastic about park use, but not for playing fields. She favored uses that would maintain the general character of the landscape, possibly with such features as a formal garden, a conservatory building, and plantings compatible with the specimen trees she and her husband had placed in the broad lawns and meadows.

Upon her death in 1968, Matilda bequeathed the grounds and buildings, including the seven-room estate house, to the St. Louis County Department of Parks and Recreation in memory of her husband, Henry Laumeier. The will gave their land and country house to the county, and specified that would be used for passive purposes (e.g., no sport fields).

The park was 76 acres (0.31 km^{2}) at its opening in 1975, but did not attract many visitors until a year later, when St. Louis sculptor Ernest Trova donated about 40 pieces of his work to the park. It soon became a popular tourist attraction, and received an additional 20 acres (0.081 km^{2}) from the Friends of Laumeier. The additional land is mostly woods, and is reserved for site-specific sculptures, including an abandoned Depression-era concrete pool from the Orchard Valley estate that once occupied the land which was transformed into Pool Complex: Orchard Valley, 1983–85, a large sculptural installation by Mary Miss.

=== Non-Profit History and County Parks Partnership ===
The founding executive director of Laumeier Sculpture Park, a 501(c)3 non-profit organization, was Dr. Beej Nierengarten-Smith, whose tenure lasted 22 years from 1979 to 2001. During these early years, the park won 6 operating grants and 2 conservation grants from the Institute of Museum and Library Services, including a grant to create an informative video about the park and an architectural assessment of its buildings. The park also received 22 grants from the National Endowment for the Arts for exhibitions and sculpture commissions.

An endowment fund was created, valued at $2 million by 2000, and the park's operating fund increased from an initial $30,000 from St Louis County to over one million from combined resources. A variety of national and international sculptors were featured, including Terry Allen, Manuel Neri, Andy Goldsworthy, Judith Shea, and Joyce J. Scott. Fifty percent of featured artists were women.

Nierengarten-Smith also created the Contemporary Arts and Crafts Fair for education revenue, the Winter Solstice program Fire and Ice, the Sand Castle Festival, Safari Camp in the woods for children and parents, and numerous other festivals for diverse audiences, including children.

A volunteer program for the park and its special events was also created. During the first 22 years, attendance rose from several hundred to 500,000 people, and the park twice received museum accreditation from the American Alliance of Museums.

When Nierengarten-Smith retired in 2001, Glen Gentele became Executive Director. When Gentele accepted a position at another museum in 2009, Marilu Knode, the former head of research at Future Arts Research at Arizona State University took the position. Knode left Laumeier in 2016 and was succeeded by Stephanie Riven as Interim Director. Current Executive Director Lauren Ross was appointed in 2018.

Today, Laumeier is a nonprofit arts organization accredited by the American Alliance of Museums (AAM). Laumeier operates in partnership with St. Louis County Parks and Recreation department. Projects and programs are supported by the Laumeier Endowment Fund, the National Endowment for the Arts (NEA), the Regional Arts Commission (RAC), the University of Missouri-St. Louis (UMSL), Missouri Arts Council (MAC), and the Arts and Education Council of St. Louis.

=== Sculpting the Future ===
In 2015, Laumeier closed its first major capital campaign, Sculpting the Future, culminating in the renovation of Laumeier’s 1917 estate house into the Kranzberg Education Lab and the construction of the Aronson Fine Arts Center for exhibitions, programs and events. The project was designed in 2010 by Trivers, a St. Louis architectural firm, and completed in 2015.

The 1917 estate house now functions as an 'Educational Lab'.

Located beyond the foyer inside the Aronson is the Emerson Visitor Center and a gift shop. The majority of products sold in the shop are made by local artists, including those of the winners of the Gracie's Shop Featured Artists' Award. These are awarded annually by a panel of jurors during the Laumeier Annual Art Fair, hosted on Mother's Day weekend at the Park since 1987.

The Aronson also includes the 3,280-square-foot Whitaker Foundation Gallery for temporary exhibitions by regional, national, and internationally-known artists each year, as well as collection storage facilities and workspace for the Preparator and Assistant Preparator.

The Siteman Carriage House, located next to the 1917 estate house, is designated for curatorial activities, including the office of the curator, a collection-focused library, and planned archive offices.

== The Collection ==
Alexander Liberman's "The Way" (1980) is often cited as the park's signature sculpture.

Among the 105 acres of Laumeier Sculpture Park are 70+ large-scale outdoor sculptures, including works by notable artists such as Alexander Liberman, Mark di Suvero, Mary Miss, Dan Graham, Beverly Pepper, Jackie Ferrara, Vito Acconci, Donald Judd, and Niki de Saint Phalle, among many others in the Collection.

=== The Way ===
Alexander Liberman completed one of the park's best-known works, The Way, in 1980. Constructed from 18 salvaged steel oil tanks, the sculpture is 65 feet (20 m) tall, 102 feet (31 m) wide, and 100 feet (30 m) deep, and weighs 55 short tons (50 t). It is painted cadmium red.

The park website describes the sculpture as a modernist work, "meant to represent the awe-inspiring impact of classical Greek temples and mammoth Gothic-style cathedrals" and modeled on post and lintel architecture.

The Way, 1972-80 was composed on-site in a clearing later named "Way Field". The work was funded by the National Endowment for the Arts and a donation by Alvin J. Siteman. In September 2011, it was restored by two workers using a hydraulic lift and 50 US gallons (190 litres) of paint.

The St. Louis Post-Dispatch described it as "iconic", while another St. Louis newspaper, the Riverfront Times, described the sculpture as having become "a symbol of both the park and the city".

== Other works by notable artists ==
- "Face of the Earth #3" (Vito Acconci, 1988)
- "La Libellule" (Arman, 1996)
- "Eclipse" (Charles Arnoldi, 1990)
- "Donut No. 3" (Fletcher Benton, 2002)
- "Java" (Anthony Caro, 1976)
- "Knots" (Cosimo Cavallaro, 1996)
- "Sugabus" (Robert Chambers, 2004)
- "Bornibus" (Mark di Suvero, 1985–87)
- "Laumeier Project" (Jackie Ferrara, 1981)
- "Four Shades" (Ian Hamilton Finlay, 1994)
- "Crete" (Charles Ginnever, 1976–78)
- "Twins" (Joseph Havel, 2007)
- Ten plaques from "Living Series" (Jenny Holzer, 1980–82)
- "Untitled" (Donald Judd, 1984)
- "Intricate Wall" (Sol LeWitt, 2001–04)
- "Ball? Ball! Wall? Wall!" (Donald Lipski, 1994)
- "Not Without My Dog" (Tea Mäkipää, 2011)
- "Aurelia Roma" (Manuel Neri, 1994)
- "This area is under 23 hour video and audio surveillance" (Ahmet Ögüt, 2009)
- "Alpha" (Beverly Pepper, 1974)
- "Cromlech Glen" (Pepper, 1985–90)
- "House of the Minotaur" (Tony Rosenthal, 1980)
- "Leelinau" (Alison Saar, 1997)
- "Ricardo Cat" (Niki de Saint Phalle, 1999)
- "American Heartland Garden" (Judith Shea, 1992)
- "Public Goddess" (Shea, 1992)
- "St. Louis Bones" (Robert Stackhouse, 1987)
- "Flooded Chambers Maid" (Jessica Stockholder, 2009–10)
- "Eye" (Tony Tasset, 2007)
- "Falling Man" (Ernest Trova, 1969)
- "Gox No 3" (Trova, 1980)
- "Abstract Variation Lozanger No. 3" (Trova, 1980)
- "Untitled" (David von Schlegell, 1966)

== See also ==
- Missouri Botanical Garden
