= Public art in Dallas =

The city of Dallas, Texas has a public art collection of over 300 individual pieces of art. Dallas Love Field Airport has almost 20 pieces of art, and Dallas/Fort Worth International Airport has over 30 more. Well known sculptures on public display include Dallas Piece by Henry Moore, Floating Sculpture by Marta Pan and Eye by Tony Tasset. Dallas has at least one Confederate memorial on public display, the Confederate War Memorial, and a memorial to freed slaves, Freedman's Memorial by David Newton, installed in 1999. Dallas Area Rapid Transit has run the DART Station Art & Design Program since 1988, and as of 2007, had about 40 installations at transit stations and Cityplace, Dallas's subway station.
