= Tilted Donut Wedge with Two Balls =

Sculpture in Berlin, Germany

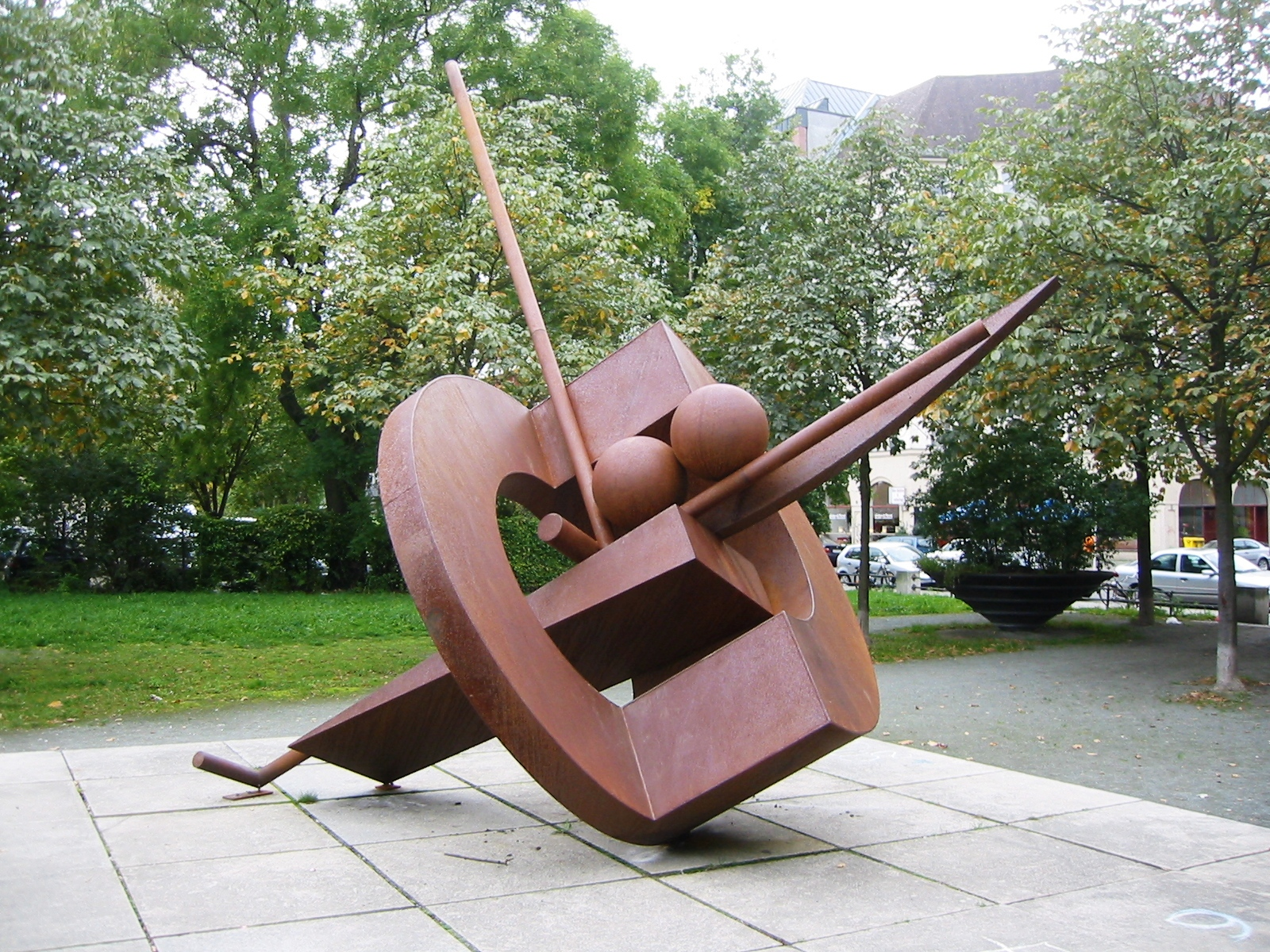
- Medium: Sculpture
- Location: Besselpark, Berlin, Germany
- 52°30′13″N 13°23′29″E

Tilted Donut Wedge with Two Balls is an outdoor sculpture by Fletcher Benton, installed at Besselpark in Berlin, Germany.
