= The Mask (1994 film) =

Film by Chuck Russell

- Theatrical release poster
- Directed by: Chuck Russell
- Screenplay by: Mike Werb
- Story by: Michael Fallon; Mark Verheiden
- Based on: The Mask by: John Arcudi; Doug Mahnke; Mike Richardson
- Produced by: Bob Engelman
- Starring: Jim Carrey; Peter Riegert; Peter Greene; Amy Yasbeck; Richard Jeni; Cameron Diaz
- Cinematography: John R. Leonetti
- Edited by: Arthur Coburn
- Music by: Randy Edelman
- Production companies: Dark Horse Entertainment; Katja Motion Picture Corporation
- Distributed by: New Line Cinema (Note: Credited as New Line Productions during the opening sequence.)
- Release date: July 29, 1994 (United States)
- Running time: 101 minutes
- Country: United States
- Language: English
- Budget: $18-23 million
- Box office: $351.8 million

The Mask is a 1994 American superhero comedy film loosely based on the 1991 comic book series by John Arcudi and Doug Mahnke. Directed by Chuck Russell and written by Mike Werb, the film stars Jim Carrey in the title role, along with Peter Riegert, Peter Greene, Amy Yasbeck, Richard Jeni, and Cameron Diaz. The plot follows Stanley Ipkiss (Carrey), a hapless and timid bank teller who discovers an enchanted mask that transforms him into a green-faced wisecracking trickster with the ability to cartoonishly alter himself and his surroundings at will. It is the first film in the Mask franchise.

Principal photography began in Los Angeles on August 30, 1993, and concluded in October. The film marked the acting debut of Diaz, who had been a model with no prior acting experience, while Carrey, who was starring on the sketch comedy series In Living Color and had just completed filming on Ace Ventura: Pet Detective (1994), was virtually unknown at the time. Their casting led to disputes with New Line Cinema executives, who expressed concern that the film would be unsuccessful without well-established actors, but the studio ultimately relented after Russell reassured them that Carrey and Diaz were the right choices.

The Mask was theatrically released in the United States on July 29, 1994, to positive reviews from critics. The film was a commercial success, grossing $351.8 million against a production budget of $18–23 million, and became the fourth-highest-grossing film of 1994. It also contributed to the resurgence of swing music in the 1990s.

Carrey received a nomination for the Golden Globe Award for Best Actor in a Motion Picture – Musical or Comedy at the 52nd Golden Globe Awards, while the film was nominated for the Academy Award for Best Visual Effects at the 67th Academy Awards. A standalone sequel, Son of the Mask, was released in 2005 without Carrey's involvement, and failed to live up to the critical and commercial success of its predecessor.

== Plot ==
In Edge City, insecure bank teller Stanley Ipkiss is frequently ridiculed by everyone except for his co-worker and best friend, Charlie Schumaker. Meanwhile, gangster Dorian Tyrell plots to overthrow his boss, Niko, who owns the Coco Bongo nightclub. One day, Tyrell sends his singer-girlfriend, Tina Carlyle, into the bank to record its layout for an upcoming robbery. Stanley is attracted to Tina and she seemingly reciprocates.

After being denied entrance to the Coco Bongo to watch Tina perform, Stanley's faulty loaner car breaks down during his drive home, leaving him stuck at a harbor's bridge. After noticing what he thinks is a humanoid figure in the river, he jumps into the water to save them. His attempt at heroism leads him to discover it is actually just a pile of garbage, he begins to sift through it, tossing it all around which leads to him uncovering and discovering the titular wooden mask. He is soon confronted by confused onlookers but he lies to them and says he had dropped the mask and went to retrieve it. He takes the mask home and tries it on, transforming him into a green-faced trickster titularly named "The Mask", who can cartoonishly alter himself and his surroundings at will. With newfound confidence, Stanley indulges in a comical rampage through the city, humiliating several of his tormentors, including his temperamental landlady and the mechanics who gave him the faulty car. Meanwhile, Niko learns of Tyrell's plans and warns him to leave Edge City in a week or face his wrath.

The following day, Stanley encounters Detective Lieutenant Mitch Kellaway and newspaper reporter Peggy Brandt, who are investigating the Mask's activity. To obtain the funds necessary to attend Tina's performance, Stanley dons the mask and raids the bank, inadvertently foiling Tyrell's robbery. At the Coco Bongo, Stanley dances exuberantly with Tina, whom he kisses. Tyrell soon confronts him for disrupting the theft and Stanley flees, leaving behind a scrap of cloth from his suit, which reverts into a piece of his pajamas. After arresting Tyrell and his henchman, Kellaway finds this evidence and suspects Stanley's involvement.

Later, Stanley consults psychiatrist Arthur Neuman, who recently published a book called The Masks We Wear; he deduces that the mask may be a creation of Loki and its powers are only active at night. Neuman believes it is mythology, but he concludes that the Mask's personality is based on Stanley's repressed desires. That night, Stanley meets Tina at a local park as the Mask until they are interrupted by Kellaway, who attempts to capture him. Stanley flees with Peggy after he distracts the police by performing a cover of the José Norman song "Cuban Pete"; Peggy then reluctantly betrays him to Tyrell for a fifty thousand dollar bounty. Tyrell dons the mask and becomes a bulky and malevolent being, and he and his henchmen force Stanley to reveal the location of the stolen money before turning him in to the police.

When Tina visits Stanley at the police station, he urges her to hastily leave the city, but not before she thanks Stanley for showing her kindness and tells him that the mask was unnecessary. She attempts to flee, but Tyrell kidnaps and prepares her for the charity ball at the Coco Bongo, hosted by Niko and attended by the city's elite, including the mayor. Upon arrival, the masked Tyrell murders Niko and prepares to destroy the club with a time bomb. Stanley's dog, Milo, helps his owner escape from his cell by retrieving the keys from the guard. Stanley sets out to stop Tyrell and takes Kellaway hostage to escape the police station.

After locking Kellaway in his car, Stanley enters the club and enlists Charlie's help, but he is quickly discovered and captured. Tina tricks Tyrell into removing the mask and kicks it away; Milo dons it and battles through the henchmen as Tyrell and Stanley fight each other. Stanley reclaims the mask and uses its powers to dispose of the bomb just before it detonates and defeat Tyrell by sending him down the drain of the club's ornamental fountain; the police arrive and arrest Tyrell's remaining henchmen. Kellaway tries to arrest Stanley again, but the mayor intervenes, implicating Tyrell as the Mask and praising Stanley, believing him to be a hero.

The following day Stanley, now exonerated and more secure, returns to the harbor bridge with Tina, Charlie and Milo. Tina discards the mask before she and Stanley kiss. Charlie tries to retrieve the mask, only for Milo to swim away with it.

== Cast ==
- Jim Carrey as Stanley Ipkiss / The Mask, a down-on-his-luck bank employee who is mistreated and taken advantage of by people. Carrey commented that he characterized Stanley after his own father: "a nice guy, just trying to get by". When wearing the Mask of Loki, the character becomes the titular green-faced trickster, who can cartoonishly alter himself and his surroundings at will.
- Peter Riegert as Lieutenant Mitch Kellaway, a slightly cynical police lieutenant bent on capturing the Mask.
- Peter Greene as Dorian Tyrell, a rogue mafia officer who desires to overthrow his superior Niko. When wearing the Mask, during which the character is portrayed by pro wrestler Jeep Swenson, he becomes a bulky and malevolent being that speaks in a demonically deep voice.
- Cameron Diaz as Tina Carlyle, Tyrell's glamorous and beautiful girlfriend, who becomes attracted to Stanley. The character is dissatisfied with Tyrell as a partner, but does not defy him until Stanley has courted her.
  - Susan Boyd provides the uncredited vocals for Tina's singing voice.
- Amy Yasbeck as Peggy Brandt, a reporter looking for a scoop to get her out of the advice column.
- Richard Jeni as Charles "Charlie" Schumaker, Stanley's best friend. Although usually amiable, the character is shown to be selfish or irrational at times.
- Orestes Matacena as Niko, a crime boss who is Tyrell's superior and the owner of the Coco Bongo.
- Reg E. Cathey (credited as Reginald E. Cathey) as Freeze, one of Tyrell's henchmen and a loyal friend of his.
- Ivory Ocean as Mitchell Tilton, the mayor of Edge City who exercises good governance and has a tough stance against crime and corruption in the city.
- Jim Doughan as Detective Doyle, Kellaway's amiable, but slightly inept partner.
- Ben Stein as Doctor Arthur Neuman, a psychiatrist who tells Stanley about the Mask's origins. He is also the author of the book The Masks We Wear, which deals with people portraying themselves differently on the outside to be accepted by others.
- Denis Forest as Sweet Eddy, one of Tyrell's henchmen.
- Nancy Fish as Agnes Peenman, Stanley's temperamental landlady.
- Joely Fisher as Maggie, a client who comes to buy concert tickets and blows Stanley off for her friend.
- Tim Bagley and Johnny Williams as Irv and Burt Ripley, the car mechanics who overcharge Stanley and gave him a faulty loaner car.
- Blake Clark as Murray, Peggy's supervisor at the city's local newspaper.
- Christopher Darga as a paramedic
- Kevin Grevioux, Richard Montes and Daniel James Peterson as some of Tyrell's lesser henchmen.
- Howard Kay and Scott McElroy as Niko's bodyguards.
- Jeremy Roberts as Bobby, one of Tyrell's henchmen. employed as the bouncer at the Coco Bongo and a friend of Charlie.
- Eamonn Roche as Mr. Dickey, Stanley and Charlie's supervisor at Edge City Bank.
- Nils Allen Stewart as Orlando, one of Tyrell's henchmen.
- Max as Milo, Stanley's Jack Russell Terrier. When wearing the Mask, the character becomes quite aggressive and mischievous but is still friendly and loyal to his owner.

== Production ==
=== Development ===
In 1989, Mike Richardson and Todd Moyer, respectively the founder and Executive Vice President of Dark Horse Comics, first approached New Line Cinema about adapting the comic The Mask into a film, after having seen offers from other studios. The main character went through several transformations in different script treatments, and the project was stalled a couple of times.

One unused Mask idea, according to Richardson, was to transform the story into one about a mask-maker who took faces off of corpses to put them on teens and turn them into zombies. Initially intended to become a new horror franchise, New Line Cinema offered the job of directing the film to Chuck Russell, who had previously worked on the A Nightmare on Elm Street franchise and the 1988 remake of The Blob. Russell found the excessive violence of the comic off-putting, and decided that it wouldn't work in a film; instead, he proposed a more comical, family-friendly tone.

=== Writing ===
Mike Werb says Chuck Russell tapped him after reading his script for a film adaptation of the Curious George books for Imagine. The two decided to turn The Mask into a wild romantic comedy. Mike Werb wrote his first draft of The Mask in less than six weeks, and less than two months later, it was green-lit.

According to Mark Verheiden, they had a first draft screenplay for a film version done back in 1990. Verheiden then wrote the second draft in early 1991, adding more humor, and that ended up being the only work he did on The Mask. Verheiden's revised draft included more instances of fourth wall breaking like "cameos" by critics Gene Siskel and Roger Ebert, and dark content such as excessive bloodshed and sexual assault. The characters Stanley, Kellaway, and Doyle carried into the final film; Stanley's girlfriend Kathleen (inspired by Kathy from the comics) evolved into Tina Carlyle while Scully and Vitelli became Dorian Tyrell and Niko, respectively. After that, the film entered development hell.

The dance sequence at Coco Bongo was inspired by the 1943 MGM animated short Red Hot Riding Hood.

=== Casting ===
In the early stages, various actors were suggested as possibilities for the lead role. Possible leads originally included Rick Moranis, Martin Short, and Robin Williams. New Line Cinema executive Mike DeLuca sent a tape of Jim Carrey performing a sketch from the comedy show In Living Color to Richardson, who noted Carrey's energy and highly expressive physicality. Director Chuck Russell had seen Carrey perform live at The Comedy Store and followed him on In Living Color and was keen to cast him in the film. Carrey was top of his list and the script had been rewritten for him, but Nicolas Cage and Matthew Broderick were also kept in consideration if he declined. Producer Bob Engelman recalled Carrey had the flu during the filming:

Jim did things that, obviously when he became a superstar, he never would do. I remember one night when he was sick as a dog and he was throwing up and he said, "I can't do this." I said, "Look, Jim, they won't let us shut down. If we don't get this, we don't get this." We dragged him out of the trailer and he was a trooper and got it in there delivered and was fantastic. But those are the sort of things that would not have happened when Jim became the superstar that he became.

Russell's first choice to play Tina had been Anna Nicole Smith; however, she backed out at the last minute, after deciding to appear in Naked Gun 33 1/3: The Final Insult instead. A costume director he had worked with recommended Cameron Diaz and they got her to audition for the part. The character was originally written as a good girl who is actually bad but after Diaz was cast the part was rewritten to make her genuinely a good person. Mike Richardson said to Forbes that Diaz proved to be the right choice. "If you watch the film again, you'll notice scenes where Jim and Cameron are together. If you watch her face, oftentimes, Jim was doing something, and she would break out laughing the minute the scene ended".

=== Visual effects ===
The Mask's visual effects were handled by Industrial Light & Magic (ILM) and Dream Quest Images. The sequences in the film which involved computer animation were supervised by ILM animation director Wes Takahashi. Although many VFX scenes had to be cut for budget, New Line invested more heavily on the special effects, as Jim Carrey was not yet an established star. Russell videotaped the rehearsals, then worked to design the effects out of Carrey's performance:

I insisted on working off Jim's face, on making the action organic to Jim's performance. No matter how good the effect is, if it's not coming out of character and story, it's not going to be effective ... The guys at ILM said they figured I saved about a million bucks once I got Jim, just on what he was able to do, versus what we intended to do originally.

Makeup effects artist Greg Cannom wanted to bring out Carrey's exaggerated facial expressions through makeup. Carrey's daily makeup sessions took four hours. The costume included fake teeth meant to be used outside of dialogue scenes, but Carrey learned to wear them while talking to play the character more convincingly.

=== Music ===
==== Soundtrack ====
The Mask: Music from the Motion Picture

Soundtrack album by Various artists
- Released: July 26, 1994
- Genres: Swing revival; R&B; new jack swing
- Label: Chaos/Columbia

Swing music and old-fashioned Latin music featured prominently in the film, and Royal Crown Revue made an on-screen cameo, which in turn influenced the swing revival later in the decade.

The Mask: Music From the Motion Picture was released on July 26, 1994, on Chaos Records through Sony Music Entertainment. It features music from: Xscape, Tony! Toni! Toné!, Vanessa Williams, Harry Connick Jr., Carrey himself and more. The songs "Cuban Pete" and "Hey Pachuco" were also used for the trailer of the 1997 Disney film Flubber.

Chart	Position
Billboard 200	80

No.	Title	Writer(s)	Artist(s)	Length
1.	"Cuban Pete (C & C Pop Radio Edit)"	José Norman	Jim Carrey	3:33
2.	"Who's That Man"	Jermaine Dupri, Manuel Seal, LaTocha Scott, Tamika Scott	Xscape	3:24
3.	"This Business Of Love"	Phil Roy, Howie Hersh. Nicholas Klein	Domino	3:27
4.	"Bounce Around"	Domingo "Sam" Samudio	Tony! Toni! Toné!	4:33
5.	"(I Could Only) Whisper Your Name"	Harry Connick Jr., Ramsay McLean	Harry Connick Jr.	3:20
6.	"You Would Be My Baby"	Keith Thomas, Philip Galdston	Vanessa Williams	3:54
7.	"Hi De Ho"	Cab Calloway, Clarence Gaskill, Irving Mills, Harry White, Louis Sharpe, Tony Moran	K7	4:35
8.	"Let The Good Times Roll"	Sam Theard, Fleecie Moore	Fishbone	3:28
9.	"Straight Up"	Brian Setzer, Dave Lambert, Otis Oscar Merritt	The Brian Setzer Orchestra	3:12
10.	"Hey Pachuco"	Royal Crown Revue, Eddie Nichols	Royal Crown Revue	3:06
11.	"Gee Baby, Ain't I Good to You"	Andy Razaf, Don Redman	Susan Boyd	2:47
12.	"Cuban Pete (Arkin Movie Mix)"	José Norman	Jim Carrey	2:10

==== Score ====
The record labels TriStar Music and Epic Soundtrax released an orchestral score soundtrack to The Mask after the original soundtrack's release. The score was composed and conducted by Randy Edelman, performed by the Irish Film Orchestra, and recorded at Windmill Lane Studios Ireland.

1. Opening – The Origin of the Mask
2. Tina
3. Carnival
4. Transformation
5. Tango in the Park
6. Lovebirds
7. Out of the Line of Fire
8. A Dark Night
9. The Man Behind the Mask
10. Dorian Gets a New Face
11. Looking for a Way Out
12. The Search
13. Forked Tongue
14. Milo to the Rescue
15. The Mask Is Back
16. Finale

== Release and reception ==
=== Box office ===
The film was a box-office success, grossing $120.1 million domestically and $351.8 million worldwide, becoming the second-highest grossing superhero movie at that time, behind Batman. In terms of global gross compared to budget, the film became the most profitable comic book movie of all time, and it remained so until 2019, when Joker surpassed it.

=== Home media ===
The film was released on VHS and Laserdisc on January 18, 1995, and on DVD on March 26, 1997. The VHS version included the Space Ghost Coast to Coast episode "The Mask", which features interviews with Jim Carrey and Chuck Russell. The DVD presented a non-anamorphic Widescreen transfer. It was eventually released as a special edition in 2005 with an anamorphic transfer. It was later released on Blu-ray Disc on December 9, 2008. It was the most rented title in the UK for the year 1995 with 3.8 million rentals. Arrow Video released a special edition 4K Blu-ray of the film on November 11th, 2025.

=== Critical response ===
On Rotten Tomatoes, the film has an approval rating of 82% based on reviews from 60 critics. The site's consensus states, "It misses perhaps as often as it hits, but Jim Carrey's manic bombast, Cameron Diaz's blowsy appeal, and the film's overall cartoony bombast keep The Mask afloat." Metacritic gave it a weighted average score of 59 out of 100 based on reviews from 12 critics. Audiences polled by CinemaScore gave the film an average grade of "B+" on an A+ to F scale.

On the television program At the Movies, Gene Siskel and Roger Ebert gave the film "two thumbs up". In his column, Ebert, who was underwhelmed by his performance in Ace Ventura, thought Carrey found "a perfect vehicle" in The Mask. He also praised the art design and called Diaz "a true discovery". Siskel, who had a similar dislike for Ace Ventura, praised Carrey's performance in The Mask by stating that he was "better used as an ingredient instead of as the plot". He also commended Diaz's performance, and he overall called the film "the latest example of technique overriding the written word in an American film".

The film received honorable mentions in the end-of-year lists of Betsy Pickle in the Knoxville News-Sentinel and Dan Craft in The Pantagraph.

=== Accolades ===
The film was nominated for Best Visual Effects at the 67th Academy Awards, but lost to Forrest Gump. The film was also nominated for Best Fantasy Film, Best Costumes and Best Make-up at the Saturn Awards. Carrey was nominated for a Golden Globe, but also a Razzie Award (for "Worst New Star").

== Derivative works ==
=== Sequels ===
After the success of the original, a sequel film was planned, with the gaming magazine Nintendo Power offering readers a chance, via sweepstakes, to win a cameo role in the film. Carrey eventually bailed on the project, forcing Nintendo Power to give the winner of the contest the equivalent cash value of the cameo role instead. A sequel, Son of the Mask, featuring neither Carrey nor Diaz, instead featuring Jamie Kennedy and Alan Cumming, was eventually released in 2005. It was a critical and commercial failure upon release, and the franchise was put on hiatus indefinitely.

On the possibility of a sequel to the 1994 film with Carrey reprising the role of Stanley Ipkiss and Diaz as Tina Carlyle, Mike Richardson said in a 2014 interview: "We've been talking about reviving The Mask, both in film and in comics. We've had a couple of false starts". In December 2024, Carrey revealed that he was still interested in portraying the Mask in a sequel depending on the idea used. In January 2025, Diaz also expressed interest in returning "if Jim's on board". In June 2026, a month before his death, Russell said, "A sequel to The Mask is always something I'm asked about. It'd be lovely to return, but for me with Jim in particular, it would be lovely to return, but we'll see. It's not ready yet, but that's a lovely idea."

=== Animated series ===
An animated television series, titled The Mask: Animated Series, made over 54 episodes from 1995 to 1997, with Rob Paulsen as Stanley Ipkiss and his alter ego, the Mask, and Neil Ross as Kellaway. Ben Stein reprised his role as Dr. Neuman. Though based on the film and making some minor references to its events, it is set in an alternate continuity where Ipkiss keeps the mask, Tina Carlyle is absent, and the mask works during daytime. Its final episode was a crossover with another Jim Carrey character, Ace Ventura. This would later continue in an episode of the Ace Ventura: Pet Detective cartoon series.

=== Video game ===
A video game based on the movie, also titled The Mask, was released for the Super Nintendo Entertainment System by Black Pearl Software in 1995. It was well received by critics as a faithful adaptation.

== See also ==
- List of American films of 1994
- List of television series and films based on Dark Horse Comics publications
- List of live-action films based on cartoons and comics
