= Orestes Matacena =

Cuban-American actor, writer, producer, and director

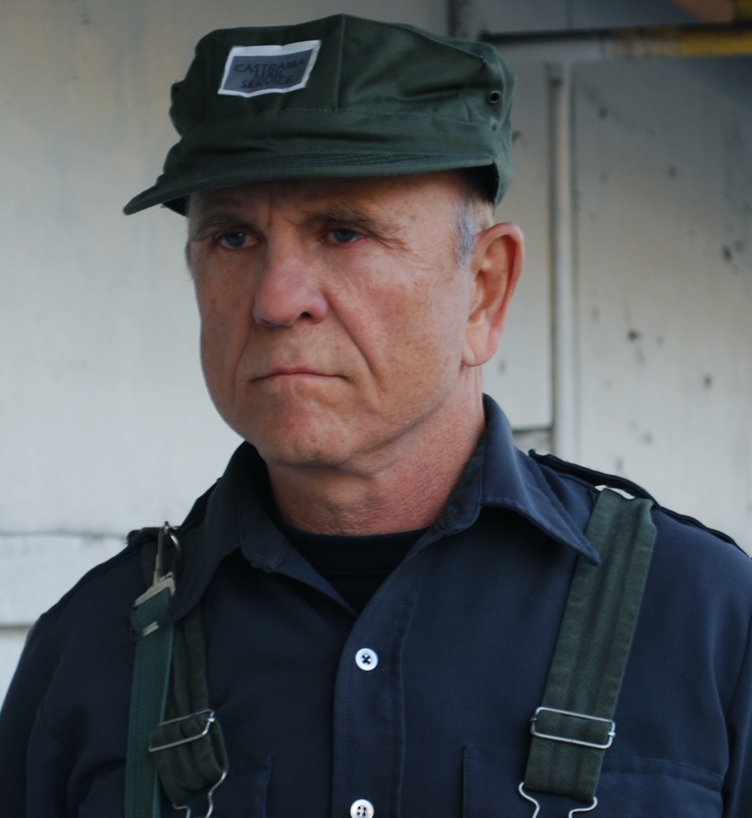
- Matacena on set of the film Viva Castrama in 2009
- Born: Orestes Matacena; August 29, 1941 (age 85); Havana, Cuba
- Occupations: Actor, director, producer, writer
- Years active: 1973–present

Orestes Matacena (born August 29, 1941) is a Cuban–American actor, director, producer and writer. His most notable appearance is Niko from The Mask.

In 1973, Matacena appeared as Olimpio in the Duo Theatre production Francesco: The Life and Times of the Cencis at La MaMa Experimental Theatre Club in the East Village of Manhattan. The production was written and directed by Manuel Martin Jr., with music by Enrique Ubieta. Magaly Alabau, who co-founded Duo Theatre with Martin, also appeared in the production. He also appeared in Azúcar Amarga.

He was awarded best actor at the 24FPS International Short Film Festival in 2013. Also in 2013, he received the Ozz Electric Award for best actor at the Vaughan Film Festival in Toronto for the film Caged Dreams.
