= Judy Ledgerwood =

American abstract painter

- Born: 1959 (age 66–67); Brazil, Indiana, United States
- Education: School of the Art Institute of Chicago, Art Academy of Cincinnati
- Known for: Painting, Installation art, Education
- Spouse: Tony Tasset
- Awards: National Endowment for the Arts, Louis Comfort Tiffany Foundation (1997), Illinois Arts Council

Judy Ledgerwood, Grandma's Flower Garden, acrylic mica, acrylic gouache and oil on canvas, 84" x 120", 2006.

Judy Ledgerwood (born 1959) is an American abstract painter and educator, who has been based in Chicago. Her work confronts fundamental, historical and contemporary issues in abstract painting within a largely high-modernist vocabulary that she often complicates and subverts. Ledgerwood stages traditionally feminine-coded elements—cosmetic and décor-related colors, references to ornamental and craft traditions—on a scale associated with so-called "heroic" abstraction; critics suggest her work enacts an upending or "domestication" of modernist male authority that opens the tradition to allusions to female sexuality, design, glamour and pop culture. Critic John Yau writes, "In Ledgerwood’s paintings the viewer encounters elements of humor, instances of surprise, celebrations of female sexuality, forms of vulgar tactility, and intense and unpredictable combinations of color. There is nothing formulaic about her approach."

Ledgerwood has exhibited widely at galleries throughout the United States and in Europe and at institutions including the Art Institute of Chicago, Museum of Contemporary Art Chicago, Smart Museum of Art, and Renaissance Society. Her work belongs to the public art collections of the Metropolitan Museum of Art, Museum of Contemporary Art, Los Angeles, Art Institute of Chicago, and Museum of Contemporary Art Chicago, among others; a monograph, Judy Ledgerwood, was published in 2009 by Hatje Cantz. Ledgerwood lives and works in the Chicago area with her husband, artist Tony Tasset, and teaches at Northwestern University.

== Life and career ==
Ledgerwood was born in 1959 in the small farming community of Brazil, Indiana and identified as an artist from an early age. Her Midwest upbringing informed the sense of space and light in her early landscape-related work and her later use of craft and decorative forms relates to being from, in her words, a "family of quilters." Ledgerwood attended the Art Academy of Cincinnati (BFA, 1982), where she met her future husband, artist Tony Tasset. After graduating, she enrolled at the School of the Art Institute of Chicago (SAIC), attracted by that city's balance of affordability, available large studio spaces, and connection to the larger art world. At SAIC, she studied under artists Christina Ramberg and Phil Hanson, among others, earning an MFA in 1984.

Ledgerwood was part of a conceptually oriented group of Chicago artists that embraced theory and a global, rather than regional, view of the art world, distinguishing them from the earlier Chicago Imagists. She began exhibiting professionally in group shows at galleries such as Randolph Street and Feature in 1987–8; solo efforts at Scott Hanson Gallery (New York, 1989) and Robbin Lockett Gallery (Chicago, 1989–92) soon followed. In 1993, she began her teaching career at SAIC; she joined the Department of Art, Theory and Practice at Northwestern University in 1995, and was tenured in 2002. She has served as the department's Director of Graduate Studies and is the Alice Welsh Skilling Professor of Art. Ledgerwood has continued to exhibit widely, at galleries including Häusler Contemporary (Munich/Zurich, 2005–19), Tracy Williams Ltd. (New York, 2005–16), 1301PE (Los Angeles, 2002–19), Rhona Hoffman (Chicago, 2000–18), Feigen, Inc. (Chicago/New York, 1993–2000), and Barbara Davis (Houston, 2013–9).

== Work and reception ==
Judy Ledgerwood, Composition in Pink, Brown and Violet, oil and wax on canvas, 90" x 144", 1992

Ledgerwood emerged in the 1980s during a postmodern crisis of faith in painting's relevance, viability, patriarchal conceits, and commodification by the art market—issues her work addresses through a range of formal and feminist-critical strategies. Her early work investigated gender issues encoded in 19th-century landscape painting and mid-20th-century Abstract Expressionism through formal choices informed by being female. Her later work has shifted toward less referential, more direct abstraction focused on structure, light, color, decorative motifs, and physical presence and experience; it directly or indirectly references antecedents including Op Art, Matisse, Warhol, and the Pattern and Decoration movement. Critics identify as central to her work: transgressive use of color as a vehicle for content and critique; imposing scale; attention to spatial relationships between picture plane and edge and surrounding physical space; freely painted, shifting motifs of patterned basic shapes; an emphasis on performative and material aspects of painting; a phenomenological embrace of tenuousness and optical effects regarding the viewing experience.

=== Landscape-related abstraction (1988–1993) ===
Critic Kathryn Hixson described Ledgerwood's early paintings as cunningly painted "commodity object[s] of seemingly inspired, moody, atmospheric space" appropriated from the sublime traditions of Romanticism (J. M. W. Turner, Albert Pinkham Ryder) and color-field painting (Mark Rothko, Barnett Newman), rather than inspired by nature. Largely monochromatic and monumental, they featured nearly uniform oil and encaustic surfaces that hovered between enveloping abstraction and irregular fields barely suggesting landscape (e.g., Composition in Pink, Brown and Violet or Summer Fog, 1992), with occasional insertions of small, flat rectangles that blurred distinctions further. While traditional reviewers were sometimes less attuned to Ledgerwood's conceptual intent, others identified in her articulation of differences a subversion of conventional equations of sublime with masculine, and beauty with feminine. Maureen Sherlock suggested that Ledgerwood's canvasses restaged domestic, "demure and private gestures" in powerful, public form through their highly charged synthetic colors (pinks, roses, reds), which evoked female domains (cosmetics, the body, interior design), and intimate markmaking (dabs, finger-painting), which deflated the mythic power and profundity of Abstract-Expressionist gesture. David Pagel described the work as orchestrating a "double-sided viewing" that "surreptitiously traced the power of American abstraction back to nature" and played havoc with simplistic oppositions such as abstract/representational, pure paint/illusionism, culture/nature.

Judy Ledgerwood, "Sunny Days" exhibition, 1301PE (Los Angeles), Installation view, 2002

=== Circular-motif abstraction (1993–2002) ===
In the early 1990s, Ledgerwood transitioned toward patterned abstraction with directly drawn, sharper-edged circular forms that suggested shimmering light (e.g., Blackness Light, 1992; Rainlight, 1993) and increasingly delved into the experience of perception. This work employed monochromatic or limited palettes and dissolving grid arrangements of dots, circles or loops, creating complex, flat plays of oscillating color, tone, surface finish and figure-ground based on light conditions, viewer position and retinal effects; critics suggest that this indeterminacy introduces elements of extended time, discovery, and "unknowability" into the viewing experience. Ledgerwood explored this motif in various color palettes, combining blacks with pinks, purples, magentas and ultramarine (e.g., Tranquilizer, 1997; Basement Love, 1999) in a series exploring sexuality, and yellows on silver and white in another, Op-Art-like series. One of the latter works (the 17' x 35' Groovin' on Lemon, 1995) comprised half of a temporary, site-specific installation commissioned for the new MCA Chicago building, which Ledgerwood described as "a meditation on light and rhythm." The adjacent, same-sized companion, Groovin' on Violet, fully emerged only after a viewer's eyes adjusted, replicating the afterimage formed from viewing the other work.

In 1999, Ledgerwood presented "Cold Days", a body of work specifically created to interact with the changing winter light that would flood its January exhibition at Chicago's Renaissance Society. The show's centerpiece was a wall of five, 8' x 9' works painted in subtly modulating lilacs, pastel blues, greens, browns and metallic silvers that functioned as an environment. Bearing titles drawn from Miles Davis's Kind of Blue album, the paintings opened to a wide range of allusions, from pop culture, fashion and design to the glamour and effervescence of champagne bubbles to climate (brittle temperatures, the sheen of ice, winter light, whiteouts) and states of contemplation. Critics compared the work's myriad shifts between obscurity and clarity to those of the Rothko Chapel and Light and Space installations of Robert Irwin. Craig Adcock wrote that the paintings resided "between being and nonbeing, just between the abyss inside and the boundless horizon outside. The operative category is the sublime, shorn of its macho, Kantian implications." In 2002, Ledgerwood created a comparable body of work for exhibition in Los Angeles, titled "Sunny Days" (1301PE, 2002).

Judy Ledgerwood, Chromatic Patterns for the Graham Foundation, site-specific Installation at Graham Foundation Madlener House, Chicago, 2014

=== Patterned abstraction and wall paintings (2002– ) ===
Ledgerwood's later work shifted toward repeated vernacular motifs (chevron and diamond, quatrefoil, and floral patterns) and a more confrontational approach embracing discordant color, an integration of painting and drawing, and greater co-optation of architectural space, including that between painting and viewer. Michelle Grabner suggested this new work laid "bare Ledgerwood's distrust of elegance and finesse" with its contemporary, doodle-like drawing, loose Pop and quilt-like patterns, Matissean flatness, and funky interior-design palettes. New York Times critic Ken Johnson described later works in this vein as "paradoxical fusions of actuality and virtuality" painted with "the carefree abandon of an improvising jazz musician." He and others noted Ledgerwood's use of irregular white-bordered edges suggesting drooping, bowed tapestries or quilts pinned to walls (e.g., Grandma's Flower Garden, 2006, above)—a reference to traditionally feminine arts—which combined with her overt decorative forms and de-stabilized grids to upend high-modernist conceits of seriousness.

Other critics, such as John Yau and Roberta Smith, have focused on an anarchic element in the work, which foregrounds imperfection and irregularity, process and messiness, humor and female sexuality, and challenges notions of the sublime and beautiful. Ledgerwood has written that a 2003 health scare prompted a reconsideration and shift in direction in her work, initially signaled—in title and form—in her show, "Ugly Beauty" (2004). Writers suggest that show's off-kilter diamond-patterned grids, unbalanced color interactions, and perspectival shifts posited a modernism reoriented toward fragility and an ungainly, lifelike mortality.

Judy Ledgerwood, Mid-Day, oil on canvas, 60" x 60", 2010

Ledgerwood has frequently extended this work into architectural space, as she did in the public commission Jour et Nuite (Paris Metro RATP Station, 2007) and two solo shows—"Hard Jam" (Tracy Williams Ltd., New York, 2007) and "Chromatic Patterns" (Hausler Contemporary, Zürich, 2008)—that featured monumental paintings and site-specific wall painting installations. In the exhibitions, she created progressions of accumulating motifs and bands of color, with single works building to painted environments that assimilated interior architectural elements and replicated being inside a painting. Ledgerwood created variations on Chromatic Patterns in immense, site-specific installations at the Smart Museum of Art (2013–5), Graham Foundation for Advanced Studies in the Fine Arts (2014) and Art Institute of Chicago (2018).

In 2010s, Ledgerwood has also increasingly introduced three-dimensional elements into her practice. These include a body of smaller, simplified paintings featuring more thickly painted, iconic cruciform arrangements of circles and schematized floral shapes (e.g., Post Punk Female Abstraction, 2010), passages of thick, viscous paint squeezed straight out of the tube, relief-like polyurethane "blob paintings," and large, painted ceramic vases.

== Collections and recognition ==
Ledgerwood's work belongs to the public art collections of the Metropolitan Museum of Art, Museum of Contemporary Art, Los Angeles, Art Institute of Chicago, Museum of Contemporary Art Chicago, Kunstmuseum St. Gallen (Switzerland), Hammer Museum, Chicago Public Library, Mary and Leigh Block Museum of Art, Milwaukee Art Museum, and Smart Museum of Art, among others. Ledgerwood is a recipient of awards from the Richard H. Driehaus Foundation (2007), Artadia (2004), and Louis Comfort Tiffany Foundation (1997), the National Endowment for the Arts, and the Illinois Arts Council.
