= The Mask (comics) =

Comic book series

- Textless cover of The Mask Strikes Back #1 (February 1995). Art by Doug Mahnke and Keith Williams.

Publication information
- Publisher: Dark Horse Comics
- First appearance: As Masque: Dark Horse Presents #10 (September 1987); As Big Head: Mayhem #1 (May 1989)
- Created by: Masque: Mike Richardson; Mark Badger; Big Head: John Arcudi; Chris Warner; Doug Mahnke

In-story information
- Alter ego: Various
- Notable aliases: Masque; Big Head; Loki
- Abilities: Reality warping; Cartoon physics

The Mask

Collected editions
- The Mask: ISBN 18-78-57450-7
- The Mask Returns: ISBN 15-69-71021-X
- The Mask Strikes Back: ISBN 15-69-71168-2
- The Mask Omnibus 1: ISBN 15-06-71253-3
- The Mask Omnibus 2: ISBN 15-06-71252-5
- Adventures of the Mask: ISBN 15-93-07938-9
- Itty Bitty Mask: ISBN 16-16-55683-8
- Dark Horse Comics/DC Comics: The Mask: ISBN 16-30-08944-3
- I Pledge Allegiance to the Mask!: ISBN 15-06-71479-X

The Mask is an American comedy horror comic book series created by Mike Richardson, developed by Doug Mahnke and John Arcudi, and published by Dark Horse Comics. Its artists include Mark Badger, Chris Warner and Keith Williams. The series tells the story of a supernatural mask that grants its wearers nearly limitless power, often at the cost of their sanity.

The original trilogy of The Mask, The Mask Returns, and The Mask Strikes Back was published as a limited series, from 1991 to 1995, and has since expanded into various spin-offs and other media, including Itty Bitty Mask and the 2019 main series revival I Pledge Allegiance to the Mask!. The series is known for its dark tone and graphic violence.

== Premise ==
The stories of The Mask revolve around a magical mask which bestows on its wearer reality-bending powers and an altered appearance, characterized by a large set of teeth and a green head. The mask affects the wearer's personality by removing all social and moral inhibitions, causing the wearer to become insane. The character was inspired by a combination of villains from DC Comics, Marvel Comics, and horror movies such as the Joker, the Green Goblin, Freddy Krueger, Dr. Jekyll and Mr. Hyde, and Steve Ditko's the Creeper. In the original comics, Stanley Ipkiss appears to be a harmless nobody, but deep down, he harbors intense repressed anger and violence. He also holds grudges against many people over trivial matters, fantasizing about cruel scenarios where he takes revenge on them. However, once he starts wearing the Mask, he transforms into a sadistic, violent, and bloodthirsty being known as Big Head. Other characters who wore the Mask became, regardless of their intentions in donning it, cruel antiheroes or murderous, vengeful villains with ultra-violent tendencies.

In contrast, in the 1994 film and the animated series, the Mask had much less predictable effects on its wearer. In the film, the main character Stanley Ipkiss is depicted as polite, meek and nebbish, but becomes a brash, confident, thieving, charismatic, dashing and still polite supervillain who later on becomes a superhero while wearing the mask, whereas Dorian Tyrell, the main villain, retains the same basic personality while wearing the mask, only more violent. The same is true in the 2005 sequel Son of the Mask.

The title of the comic book originally referred to the mask itself and not the character it unleashed. In early stories, the character was referred to as Big Head; it was not until the films and television series that the character became known as The Mask.

== Characters ==
- The Mask/Big Head – The titular mask is a semi-living entity possessing anyone wearing it and becoming Big Head. As such, it is both the protagonist and antagonist of the series depending on the motivations of its wearer.
- Walter – Big Head's arch-enemy - a mute, brutish man who worked for the Mob.
- Mitch Kellaway – One of the Mask's archenemies and a police officer who was one of the wearers of the mask.
- Stanley Ipkiss – The first person to encounter the Mask.
- Kathy Matthews – Also known as Katherine/Kathleen. Stanley's ex-girlfriend and a friend of Mitch, as well as one of the wearers of the mask.
- Nunzio – A long-suffering cab driver for the mob who ends up becoming one of the wearers of the Mask who used its powers to seize control of all crime in the city for a time.
- Lionel Ray – A police detective and friend of Mitch who encounters the Mask.
- Abner Mead – A political candidate who seeks to use the Mask to become the President of the United States.
- Ray Turtle – A young homeless man who used the Mask to kill his abusive former foster parents.
- Mask Hunters – A group of Neo-Nazis trying to use the Mask for their plans.

== Publication history ==
The base concept of The Mask was created by Mike Richardson on 5 February 1982. It first saw life as a single sketch he drew in 1985 for APA-5, an amateur press publication created by writer Mark Verheiden. After starting Dark Horse Comics, Richardson pitched his concept to Marvel Comics comic book writer/artist Mark Badger. The outcome was the Masque strip that ran in the early issues of Dark Horse Presents. Badger's strips became increasingly political, and Richardson ended the strip to bring the character back to his original concept.

Artist Chris Warner was hired to revamp the character based on Richardson's original APA-5 drawing and created the definitive look for the character. This new look was launched in 1989 in the pages of Dark Horse's Mayhem anthology. Aspiring writer John Arcudi and artist Doug Mahnke were hired to create the new adventures, which became the first popular use of the character, "a combination of Tex Avery and The Terminator". The Mask stories from Mayhem #1–4 were later collected as the 1991 issue The Mask #0 and also in a trade paperback collection.

Mayhem was canceled after four issues, but, in 1991, Arcudi and Mahnke continued with The Mask four issue limited series, which introduced one of the Mask's antagonists, a mute brutish hulk named Walter. This run was among Dark Horse's best sellers; following it, the company continued a succession of miniseries around the Mask, with various antagonists and protagonists wearing the mask. These series concluded in 2000 with the DC Comics crossover Joker/Mask, in which the magical Mask finds its way into the hands of Batman's arch-enemy The Joker. The first major storylines and the Joker/Mask crossover have all been collected in trade-paperback format and in a limited-edition hardcover box set. It was later revived as two spin-off series: Itty Bitty Mask and I Pledge Allegiance To The Mask!.

== Original limited series ==
=== The Mask ===
The Mask

Publication information
- Schedule: Monthly
- Format: Limited series
- Publication date: July – December 1991
- No. of issues: 5

Creative team
- Written by: John Arcudi
- Artist: Doug Mahnke
- Letterer(s): Pat Brosseau; David Jackson
- Colorist(s): Doug Mahnke; Matt Webb
- Editor: Mike Richardson

In an antiques shop, a weak, neurotic man named Stanley Ipkiss shops for a gift to give to his girlfriend, Kathy Matthews. At the store he purchases an old jade mask which begins to speak to him. When Stanley wears it, he is transformed into a wacky super-powered being with an abnormally large, bald, green-skinned head and a mouthful of large teeth. After exploring his new abilities, Ipkiss goes on a rampage, taking revenge on those with whom he has a grudge, and earns the nickname Big Head.

After taking the mask off, Stan begins to realize what has been happening. His acts as Big Head begin to take an emotional toll on him. He becomes verbally abusive toward Kathy. She kicks him out, but keeps the mask since it was a gift from Stanley.

Later, Stan breaks into Kathy's apartment to steal it back just as the police arrive in response to an earlier housebreaking call. Deciding his only way out is as Big Head, Stan puts the mask back on and kills multiple cops during his escape in addition to causing a great deal of property damage. He returns home as Big Head and removes the mask, preparing to leave the city; only to be shot in the back and killed by Kathy now wearing the mask, who figured out the identity of Big Head and donned the mask while Stan's back was turned after he took it off.

Kathy takes the mask to Lieutenant Kellaway for safe-keeping. Kellaway, who had been struggling with both the recent Big Head murders, and organized crime lords on the loose in his city, disregards Kathy's warnings, believing she is stressed and not thinking clearly, and tries on the mask. Becoming Big Head, Kellaway sets out to take down the crime lords who have plagued his police career.

City dwellers, not knowing of the magical mask, assumes Big Head is still the same killer whose targets are now high-profile crime lords. Despite Kellaway's good intentions, the mask causes his methods to become increasingly more violent. Big Head encounters Walter, a behemoth-sized mob muscle-man who never speaks, who has undertaken a vendetta against Big Head for killing his employers. Walter never shows pain and is the only one who can injure Big Head to any real degree.

While fighting off Walter's attacks, Lieutenant Kellaway, as Big Head, becomes the target of a police manhunt. Big Head fights off the police and tracks down the remaining mobsters. When Kellaway's partner attempts to stop Big Head, the mask-altered policeman nearly kills his friend and colleague. Kellaway, realizing what he has been doing, flees. He removes the mask, buries it in his basement in cement, and vows never to let it be worn again.

The first half of the story following Stan as Big Head was originally published in the four-issue anthology series Mayhem, between May–September 1989, and was then collected as issue #0 and the first part of the trade paperback.

=== The Mask Returns ===
The Mask Returns

Publication information
- Schedule: Bimonthly
- Format: Limited series
- Publication date: October 1992 – March 1993
- No. of issues: 4

Creative team
- Written by: John Arcudi
- Artist: Doug Mahnke
- Letterer: Pat Brosseau
- Colorist: Chris Chalenor
- Editor: Mike Richardson

The crime lords send men to Lieutenant Kellaway's home and attempt to kill him. Kellaway makes his way to the basement in an attempt to retrieve the mask. But he is wounded before he can put it on and ends up in a coma. After the shooting, the men escape, taking the mask with them. One of them puts it on the wimpy driver, Nunzio, as a joke, but he becomes Big Head. Big Head kills the thugs and all of the crime lords, thus becoming the city's preeminent crime boss. Kathy, realizing the return of Big Head means Kellaway failed to hide the mask well enough, knows that it is up to her to stop him. She dresses as a hooker, and Big Head falls head over heels for her. She tricks him into taking off the mask, pulls out a gun, and as Nunzio dives for the mask she shoots and kills him. Kathy uses the mask to escape and decides to go after the real crime boss (from whom Big Head had stolen the office while he was in Miami), Don Mozzo. When Don comes back from Miami, he knows Big Head is after him and he goes to get help from the one man who can help him, Walter. After Kathy destroys the remaining mobsters, she comes across and gets into a fight with the only man left, Walter. However, Kathy decides to throw caution to the wind and surrenders after deciding neither one of them are going to die and soon some random bystander will just come across the Mask anyway and tosses it to Walter, but he seems to have no interest in it. Kellaway, recovered from the hospital, drives his car into Walter, sending him and the Mask into the docks.

=== The Mask Strikes Back ===
The Mask Strikes Back

Publication information
- Schedule: Monthly
- Format: Limited series
- Publication date: February – June 1995
- No. of issues: 5

Creative team
- Written by: John Arcudi
- Artist: Doug Mahnke
- Inker: Keith Williams
- Letterer: Lois Buhalis
- Colorist: Gregory Wright
- Editor(s): Michael Eury; Greg Vest

Four friends, named Rick (a disgruntled anarchist), Ben (a failed musician), Hugo (a recovering drug addict) and Archie (a teenage savant), feel that their lives are at a dead end, until Rick, fascinated by the Big Head murders, finds the magical mask by the city pier and brings it home. Realizing this was the source of their hero's power, each of the four take turns trying it on. They attempt to use its power to fix their lives but end up making things worse for themselves. By the end, Walter, having recovered since being plowed into by Kellaway, finds the mask in his hands and is unable to use it and, in frustration, throws it off into the distance with tremendous force.

This was the last series in the original Mask storyline by Arcudi and Mahnke. It was also the first to be made after the success of the film, and, as such, the violence of the earlier stories was toned down and the comic aspects were more prominent than before.

=== The Mask: The Hunt for Green October ===
The Mask: The Hunt for Green October

Publication information
- Schedule: Monthly
- Format: Limited series
- Publication date: July – October 1995
- No. of issues: 4

Creative team
- Written by: Evan Dorkin
- Artist: Peter Gross
- Letterer: Pat Brosseau
- Colorist: Matt Webb
- Editor: Greg Vest

The Mask continues to find its way into the hands of unwitting wearers. One of these is Ray Tuttle, a loser film-buff with a grudge against an entrepreneur who escaped responsibility after a faulty theme park ride the latter owned caused the death of his wife, leaving his daughter, Emily, mute. Tuttle discovers the mask's power, but Lieutenant Kellaway and a group of terrorists aware of the mask's secrets are looking to take it from him. The title parodies the novel The Hunt for Red October.

=== The Mask: Southern Discomfort ===
The Mask: Southern Discomfort

Publication information
- Schedule: Monthly
- Format: Limited series
- Publication date: April – July 1996
- No. of issues: 4

Creative team
- Written by: Rich Hedden
- Artist: Goran Delic
- Letterer: Pat Brosseau
- Colorist(s): James Sinclair; Pamela Rambo
- Editor: Greg Vest

In New Orleans, the mask ends up in the hands of Eric Martin who tries to find his sister, who has been kidnapped by voodoo gangsters, while Lieutenant Kellaway looks for the mask so that he can destroy it.

=== The Mask: Toys in the Attic ===
The Mask: Toys in the Attic

Publication information
- Schedule: Monthly
- Format: Limited series
- Publication date: August – November 1998
- No. of issues: 4

Creative team
- Written by: Bob Fingerman
- Artist: Sibin
- Inker: Bernard Kolle
- Letterer: Annie Parkhouse
- Colorist: Pamela Rambo
- Editor: Scott Allie

Toy designer named Aldo Krasker gets his hands on the mask which leads him to subconsciously embark on a murder spree against high school colleagues who had ridiculed his acting skills. Lieutenant Kellaway joins the investigation so he can find the mask. Doug Mahnke returned to illustrate the covers for this series.

=== The Mask: I Pledge Allegiance to the Mask! ===
The Mask: I Pledge Allegiance to the Mask!

Publication information
- Schedule: Monthly
- Format: Limited series
- Publication date: October 2019 – January 2020
- No. of issues: 4

Creative team
- Written by: Christopher Cantwell
- Artist: Patric Reynolds
- Letterer: Nate Piekos
- Colorist: Lee Loughridge
- Editor: Daniel Chabon

Acknowledging how the main series was dormant for twenty years, the mask had been buried in concrete for two decades, during which Kellaway retired in California and Kathy became mayor of Edge City. Struggling politician Abner Mead finds it, and as Big Head uses his uninhibited and at times violent outbursts to make himself endearing to the populace and run for President of the United States.

== Specials, spin-offs, and crossovers ==
=== The Mask: Official Movie Adaptation ===
The Mask: Official Movie Adaptation

Publication information
- Schedule: Monthly
- Format: Limited series
- Genre: Superhero
- Publication date: July – August 1994
- No. of issues: 2

Creative team
- Written by: Mike Richarson
- Artist: Kilian Plunkett
- Inker: Bruce Patterson
- Letterer: Sean Konot
- Colorist: Chris Chalenor
- Editor: Bob Schreck

The Mask: Official Movie Adaptation is a two-issue comic book adaptation of the 1994 film starring Jim Carrey. In addition to retelling its story, the comic book version also contains deleted scenes most often seen as extra features in video releases of the movie, such as the death of the supporting character Peggy Brandt, and completely unseen moments, such as Stanley Ipkiss' watch being stolen by the same group of thugs that he pays back with the balloon animal routine. Some dialogue is also changed.

=== The Mask: World Tour ===
The Mask: World Tour

Publication information
- Schedule: Monthly
- Format: Limited series
- Publication date: December 1995 – March 1996
- No. of issues: 4

Creative team
- Written by: Robert Loren Fleming
- Artist: Gary Erskine
- Letterer: Annie Parkhouse
- Colorist: Bernie Mireault
- Editor: Greg Vest

A new wearer of the magical mask finds his way traveling through Dark Horse Comics' universe.

=== Adventures of the Mask ===
Adventures of the Mask

Publication information
- Schedule: Monthly
- Format: Ongoing series
- Publication date: January – December 1996
- No. of issues: 12

Creative team
- Written by: Michael Eury
- Artist(s): Neil Vokes; Dev Madan; Marc Campos
- Inker(s): Jay Geldhof; Ande Parks; Barbara Kaalberg
- Letterer: Clem Robins
- Colorist(s): Matt Webb; Perry McNamee
- Editor(s): Greg Vest; Scott Allie

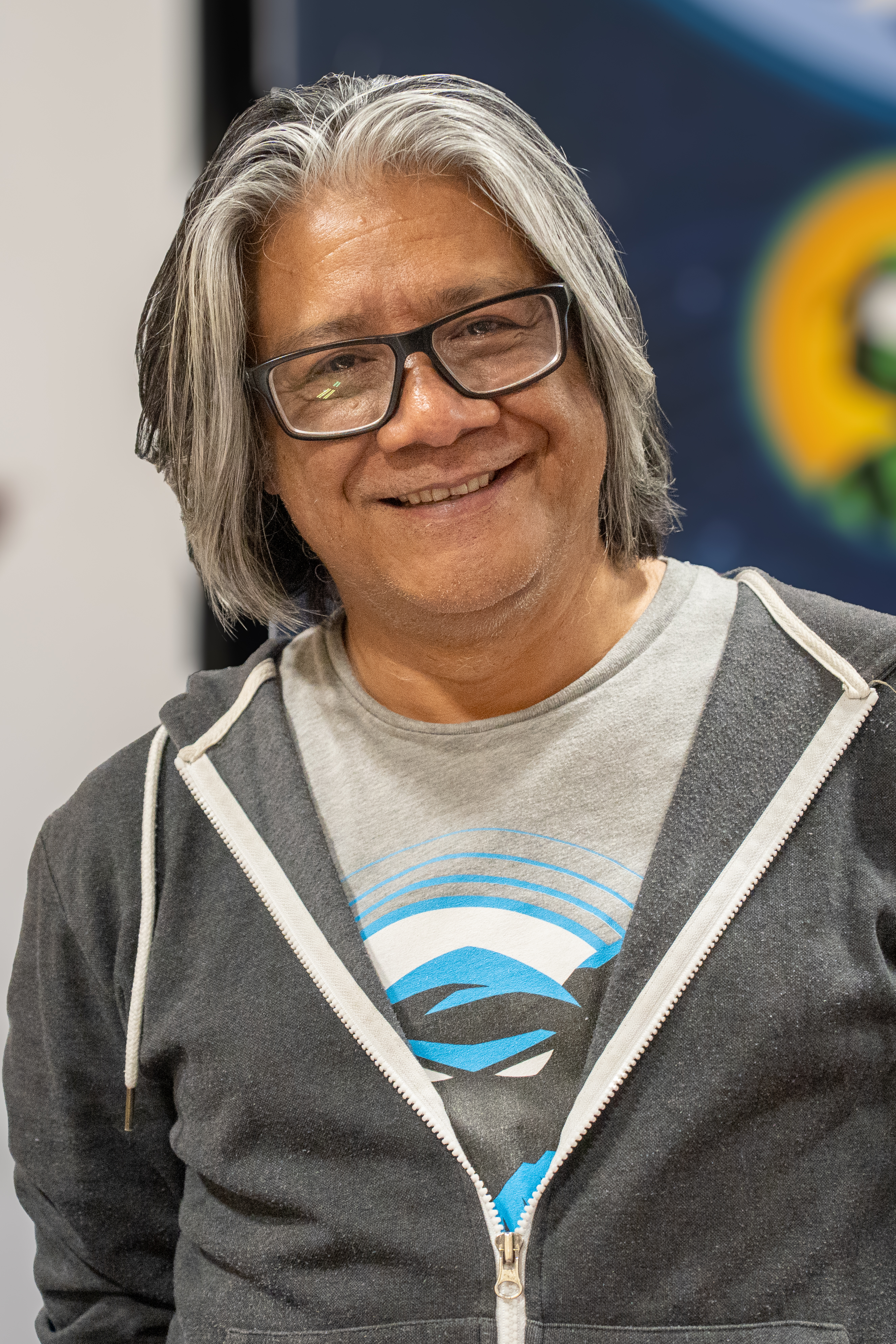
Dev Madan at Comic Con Oakland 2026

Following the success of The Mask film, which led to the release of The Mask: Animated Series, Dark Horse published this spinoff comic series, which followed the continuity of the television cartoon. Like the show, this title combined elements of both the original adult comics and the movie. Elements from the film included The Mask as he was portrayed in the film: goofy, good-hearted and heroic with his trademark yellow suit and hat. From the early comics were Walter, still Pretorius' Henchman, and a Lieutenant Kellaway more like his original counterpart than as he was depicted in film.

=== Walter: Campaign of Terror ===
Walter: Campaign of Terror

Publication information
- Schedule: Monthly
- Format: Limited series
- Publication date: February – May 1996
- No. of issues: 4

Creative team
- Written by: John Arcudi
- Artist: Doug Mahnke
- Inker: Keith Williams
- Letterer: Joe Rosen
- Colorist: Marcus David
- Editor: Greg Vest

Big Head's arch-enemy, Walter, the indestructible mafia hitman, runs for mayor of Edge City.

=== "Night of the Return of the Living Ipkiss... Kinda" ===
"Night of the Return of the Living Ipkiss... Kinda"

Creative team
- Written by: John Arcudi
- Artist: Doug Mahnke
- Letterer: Clem Robins
- Colorist: Chris Chalenor
- Editor: Randy Stradley

After Kathy visits Ipkiss' grave, he returns from the dead as a zombie Big Head, with a thirst for revenge. Walking around the city, he finds and kills Kellaway, Walter, Don Mozzo, Lionel, many police officers, and a biker. When he finally finds Kathy, she yells at him, telling him that he does not have the mask anymore and he could not have come back to life as Big Head. After that, he becomes a pile of dust and all the individuals he murdered are brought back to life.

=== Grifter and the Mask ===
Grifter and the Mask

Publication information
- Publisher: Dark Horse Comics; WildStorm
- Schedule: Monthly
- Format: Limited series
- Publication date: September – October 1996
- No. of issues: 2

Creative team
- Written by: Steven Seagle
- Artist: Luciano Lima
- Inker: Joe Pimentel
- Letterer: Clem Robins
- Colorist: Cary Porter
- Editor(s): Dave Chipps; Greg Vest

Grifter, of the WildC.A.T.s., is sent to Las Vegas to break up a weapons smuggling ring at a gun show. Trouble ensues when one of the tourists ends up with the mask, and Big Head causes a riot at the gun show by pulling a knife. Grifter initially mistakes the Mask for a target, but when the tourist's girlfriend is threatened, Grifter and the Mask team up to stop the smuggling ring.

=== Lobo/Mask ===
Lobo/Mask

Publication information
- Publisher: Dark Horse Comics; DC Comics
- Schedule: Monthly
- Format: Limited series
- Publication date: February – March 1997
- No. of issues: 2

Creative team
- Written by: John Arcudi; Alan Grant
- Artist: Doug Mahnke
- Inker: Keith Williams
- Letterer: Ken Lopez
- Colorist: Francesco Ponzi
- Editor: Dan Raspler

The alien bounty hunter Lobo is hired to find the "Ultimate Bastich", a being who has decimated numerous planets. Lobo's hunt leads him to Earth, where a petty thief has become Big Head. In a battle that decimates Manhattan, Big Head finally offers to "help" Lobo find the "previous wearer." The duo head through space causing mass destruction. At a space truck stop, Lobo eventually wins the mask for himself, puts it on, and causes even more damage. A black hole sends him back in time by a month and it turns out that he is, in fact, the Ultimate Bastich. Waking up on Earth and realizing this, Lobo tosses the mask back to the same spot where the thief found it. Lobo breaks the time loop when he meets his past self and turns his past self in for the reward money.

=== The Mask: Virtual Surreality ===
The Mask: Virtual Surreality

Publication information
- Format: One-shot
- Publication date: July 1997

Creative team
- Written by: Michael Eury; Sergio Aragonés; Mark Evanier; Aaron Lopresti; Mike Mignola; Dave Taylor; Dave Cooper
- Artist(s): Ivan Reis; Edde Wagner; Sergio Aragonés; Aaron Lopresti; Mike Mignola; Dave Taylor; Dave Cooper
- Letterer(s): Clem Robins; Stan Sakai; Ken Bruzenak; Pat Brosseau
- Colorist(s): Dave Nestelle; Chris Chalenor; James Sinclair; Pamela Rambo
- Editor: Scott Allie

The Mask: Virtual Surreality is a collection of stories by different authors. Stanley Ipkiss watches his favorite TV show The Dukes of Hazzard when a commercial broadcast of Dr. Buzz Hedgaymes offers a new gadget for home entertainment: the Virtual Surreality. Dr. Hedgaymes offers The Mask a chance to test his new machine. Stanley takes up the offer, puts on the mask to bring his alter-ego out, and The Mask spins to Dr. Hedgaymes' lab within moments. The Mask arrives just as Hedgaymes begins to explain the machine to him, while testing it on him, and various events, including barbarians, superheroes and weird cartoons to demons, suddenly play with The Mask in Stanley Ipkiss's childhood, then ends up meeting Stanley's mother while he ends up being turned into a boy which Stanley's mother is like Stanley being kind, polite, nice and motherly to him, but then starts to get aggressive to him when she tells him to take his face off but he refuses so she tries to take his face off, which is when he realises something's not right considering that Stanley's mother is never like that and Stanley never told his mother about him. So The Mask discovers that Pretorius was Hedgaymes all along. Pretorius challenges The Mask to play rock–paper–scissors. Pretorius foresees the outcome, decides not to play fair and, using giant scissors, tries to cut The Mask's head off. The Mask counters with a giant hand made out of stone. The Mask then shows he is a fan of the show that Stanley was watching early, since he opts to go for another round of The Dukes of Hazzard before sending Pretorius to the police.

=== The Mask/Marshal Law ===
The Mask/Marshal Law

Publication information
- Schedule: Monthly
- Format: Limited series
- Publication date: February – March 1998
- No. of issues: 2

Creative team
- Written by: Pat Mills
- Artist: Kevin O'Neill
- Letterer: Ellie DeVille
- Colorist: Dave Stewart
- Editor: Scott Allie

The Mask is applied to a superhuman serial killer as part of a secret government experiment which inevitably goes disastrously wrong. Marshal Law is called in to take down a nemesis who is not only immune to his usual ultra-violence, but can warp reality according to his psychotic whims.

=== "Angry Young Mask" ===
"Angry Young Mask"

Creative team
- Written by: Rick Geary
- Artist: Rick Geary
- Inker: Rick Geary
- Letterer: Rick Geary
- Editor: Randy Stradley

"Angry Young Mask" is a short comic book story focusing on an 11-year-old boy named Ned, who has a problem with his unfair parents. One day he finds the mask and wears it, causing a lot of mischief in the process. Later, Ned removes the Mask and throws it in his backyard, but when morning comes, Ned finds his two-year-old brother Josh wearing the mask.

=== "No Mask Is an Island" ===
"No Mask Is an Island"

Creative team
- Written by: Henry Gilroy
- Artist: Lucas Marangon
- Inker: Randy Emberlin
- Letterer: Steve Dutro
- Editor: Randy Stradley

On hill roads at night, a professor of anthropology tells a young museum collector the history about the mask and its victims. A depressed airplane pilot, smoking in a cargo area, finds the mask and goes insane. He flies and crashes an aircraft into a mountain killing the rest of his crew, He survives and, after removing the mask, becomes a resident of a mental institution. Later at the crash site, a little girl living on a nearby farm, finds the mask and races home to show her abusive drunken father. That night the girl wears the mask and murders her father, She then calls the police to report a green-faced lunatic. Afterwards the girl is sent to a foster home with kindly foster parents, She goes to a church for confession and the priest takes the mask for safe keeping. A short time later he dons the mask and becomes a sex-crazed maniac with the nuns. After the church's unsuccessful attempt at exorcism, the priest sadly removes the mask and claims that the mask forced him to do unspeakable things. The church hires a professor to trace the mask's origins and he discovers it is a thousand years old, made using African techniques, but decorated with Scandinavian motifs. After analyzing the mask, the professor can not give the church an explanation for it so they decide to destroy it. But the professor finds a museum which is willing to donate a small fortune to acquire the mask. The young museum collector does not really believe the professor's story and puts the mask back in a box as they head for the city - presumably Gotham City.

=== Joker/Mask ===
Joker/Mask

Publication information
- Publisher: Dark Horse Comics; DC Comics
- Schedule: Monthly
- Format: Limited series
- Publication date: May – August 2000
- No. of issues: 4

Creative team
- Written by: Henry Gilroy; Ronnie del Carmen
- Artist: Ramon F. Bachs
- Inker: Howard M. Shum
- Letterer: Steve Dutro
- Colorist: Dave McCaig
- Editor: Dave Land

The Joker inadvertently gets his hands on the magical mask after it is found in a Gotham City museum. With its power, the Joker begins to feel it is time to rejuvenate his career as a criminal, taking over Gotham TV and broadcasting his own shows. Meanwhile, his sidekick Harley Quinn is unable to cope with the change and gets jealous when she is temporarily replaced by two women called the Jokettes. She immediately seeks help from Poison Ivy who not only kills the Jokettes but secretly tries to obtain the Mask but to no avail. Lieutenant Kellaway finds his way to Gotham and helps Batman and Commissioner Gordon to defeat the newly super-powered Joker, Batman determining that the Mask is not having its usual psychological effect on the wearer as the Joker always expressed his 'innermost desires', with the mask merely making him unstoppable. Batman is able to trick the Joker into removing the Mask by claiming that the villain is no longer funny, and is relying on tired schtick and the power of the Mask instead of using his own style, prompting the Joker's original head to emerge from his shoulder and actually converse with his Mask-head before he takes it off. The Joker, Harley, and Ivy are arrested and although he is furious by his defeat, he manages to reconcile his relationship with Harley. Lieutenant Kellaway asks Batman to give him the Mask, to which he agrees, and the Mask is last seen as Kellaway digs up Stanley Ipkiss's grave and buries the Mask there with his corpse.

=== Itty Bitty Mask ===
Itty Bitty Mask

Publication information
- Schedule: Monthly
- Format: Limited series
- Publication date: November 2014 – February 2015
- No. of issues: 4

Creative team
- Written by: Art Baltazar; Franco
- Artist: Art Baltazar
- Editor: Brendan Wright

When mild-mannered zookeeper Herman Shazbert buys his wife a strange mask, his whole family wants to try it on. The comics of the short-lived line Itty Bitty took a more silly and kid-friendly approach, similar to DC Comics' Tiny Titans, also illustrated by Art Baltazar. Dark Horse Comics also released Itty Bitty Hellboy, Itty Bitty Comics: Grimmiss Island, and Itty Bitty Hellboy: The Search for the Were-Jaguar.

== The Mask omnibus collections ==
Dark Horse Comics has published two omnibus editions featuring The Mask stories in chronological order. However, this collection didn't reprint bonus materials previously released in the individual trade paperbacks for the individual series, such as deleted pages, author forwards, and retrospectives.

The Mask Omnibus Volume 1

Collects The Mask #0–4, The Mask Returns #1–4 and The Mask Strikes Back #1–5. Published August 13, 2008. Second Edition published March 27, 2019.

The Mask Omnibus Volume 2

Collects The Mask: The Hunt for Green October #1–4, The Mask: World Tour #1–4, The Mask: Southern Discomfort #1–4, "Night of the Return of the Living Ipkiss... Kinda" and The Mask: Toys in the Attic #1–4. Published March 11, 2009. Second Edition published September 11, 2019.

Adventures of the Mask Omnibus

Collects The Mask: Official Movie Adaptation #1–2, Adventures of the Mask #1–12, The Mask: Virtual Surreality, "Angry Young Mask" and "No Mask Is an Island". Published July 15, 2009.

== Adaptations ==
=== The Mask (1994) ===
Jim Carrey as the Mask for the 1994 film

A film version of The Mask was released in the United States on July 29, 1994, starring Jim Carrey in the title role. Directed by Chuck Russell, the film co-starred Peter Greene as Dorian Tyrell, Peter Riegert as Lt. Mitch Kellaway, Orestes Matacena as Niko, Richard Jeni as Charlie Schumacher, Amy Yasbeck as Peggy Brandt, and Cameron Diaz, in her screen debut, as Tina Carlyle. Ben Stein has a cameo role as Dr. Arthur Neuman.

While there were early efforts to take the film in the direction of horror (some at New Line Cinema saw it as a replacement for their fading A Nightmare on Elm Street franchise), it was never completely intended as a "dark horror" picture. New Line had problems coming up with a script that could show violence that was comical, but had more success with a story that was primarily a comedy and had violence. Mike Richardson and Chuck Russell always pushed in the direction of the second option, which was eventually adopted. Executive producer Michael De Luca's suggestion of Jim Carrey for the lead, together with the "Cuban Pete" production number in the screenplay, set the final tone for the film.

The plot of the film was loosely based on the first half of the Arcudi/Mahnke comic book miniseries.

The film also inspired a spin-off video game adaptation, released for the Super NES in 1995.

=== The Mask: Animated Series (1995–1997) ===
The film version of the character subsequently appeared in an animated TV series entitled The Mask: Animated Series (with Rob Paulsen as Stanley Ipkiss/The Mask). John Arcudi wrote season one's "How Much is That Dog in the Tin Can" and season three's "The Goofalotatots" (a parody of Warner Bros. Animation's Animaniacs, which Paulsen starred in). The series took many elements from the source film but made numerous changes. Tina was absent, and reporter Peggy Brandt had become the main female character, but not a love interest. Also, unlike in the film, Ipkiss appeared to be able to use the mask in daytime as well as at night, while gaining the mischievous and heroic personality of The Mask along with having superpowers. The series also had a crossover with Ace Ventura: Pet Detective, another animated series based on a Jim Carrey film.

Four VHS volumes of the series were released (an extra two in Australia), all of which are now out of print. Upon the initial DVD release of Son of the Mask, Wal-Mart stores sold an exclusive two-pack of the film with the pilot episode of the animated series ("The Mask Is Always Greener on the Other Side" Parts 1 and 2).

=== Son of the Mask (2005) ===
Son of the Mask is the stand-alone sequel to the 1994 film, directed by Lawrence Guterman. The film had an $84 million budget and a $17 million domestic box office gross, along with a $40 million foreign box office gross.

Director Chuck Russell, who helmed the original film, expressed his interest in a sequel in his 1996 LaserDisc commentary. He was hoping Carrey would return, along with Amy Yasbeck. Russell had decided to cut the scenes when Peggy dies and leave the character open for the sequel, which became this film. The concept was completely changed when Carrey decided not to return. Though it does exist in the same universe as the 1994 film, the plot instead focuses on another man (played by Jamie Kennedy) who finds the mask and unintentionally conceives a child while wearing it. The result is a son who possesses the powers of the mask without needing to wear it. At the same time, Loki (played by Alan Cumming), the Norse God and original creator of the mask, searches the human world attempting to find it.

Ben Stein reprises his role of Dr. Arthur Neuman from the first film. He is involved in the film to reestablish the relationship between the mask and its creator Loki. He is the only actor to appear in both films as well as the animated series.

=== Space Jam: A New Legacy (2021) ===
The Stanley Ipkiss version of the Mask appears in Space Jam: A New Legacy. He is among the Warner Bros. Serververse inhabitants that watch the basketball match between the Tune Squad and the Goon Squad. The Mask can be seen with two versions of the Penguin from the Batman franchise, one from the 1966 Batman Television series and one from the 1992 film Batman Returns.
