= Tony Tasset =

American artist

- Born: 1960; Cincinnati, Ohio

Tony Tasset is an American artist. His works consists mainly of video, bronze, wax, sculpture, photography, film, and taxidermy. He has had exhibitions in Dallas, Chicago, Milwaukee, New York, Los Angeles, Germany, Canada, Portugal, Italy, Ecuador, and London.

Tasset was born in Cincinnati, Ohio. He received his BFA from The Art Academy of Cincinnati, and his MFA from The School of the Art Institute of Chicago (1985). In 1986, 13 pieces of his art were purchased by two New York art dealers at the Chicago Art Expo. Tasset received an Award in Visual Arts along with $15,000 cash in 1989. He was also awarded the John Simon Guggenheim Fellowship in 2006 and The Louis Comfort Tiffany Award. He is an Emeritus Professor of Art at the University of Illinois Chicago and is married to the painter Judy Ledgerwood.

== Solo exhibitions ==
- 2007 Laumeier Sculpture Park, St. Louis, MO
- 2003 University Galleries at Illinois State University, Normal, IL
- 2002 Feigen Contemporary, New York City, NY
- 2001 Christopher Grimes Gallery, Santa Monica, CA and Donald Young Gallery, Chicago, Illinois
- 2000 Feigen Contemporary, New York City, NY
- 1998 Institute of Visual Arts, Milwaukee, WI
- 1997 Feigen Contemporary, New York City, NY
- 1993 Rhona Hoffman Gallery, Chicago, IL
- 1992 Galeri Pedro Oliveira, Porto
- 1991 Rhona Hoffman Gallery, Chicago, IL
- 1989 Rhona Hoffman Gallery, Chicago, IL

== Selected exhibitions and group shows ==
- 2009 Lora Reynolds Gallery, Austin TX
- 2008 Kavi Gupta Gallery, Chicago, IL; Muse’e d’ art contemporain de Montreal, Montreal QC; Museum of Contemporary Art-Chicago, IL; Blum & Poe, Los Angeles, CA
- 2007 Kavi Gupta Gallery, Chicago, IL; Rhona Hoffman Gallery, Chicago, IL
- 2006 KW Institute for Contemporary Art, Berlin; Ubu Gallery, New York City, NY; P.S.I. Contemporary Art Center, Long Island;
- Istanbul Museum of Modern Art, Istanbul
- 2005 The Renaissance Society at The University of Chicago, Chicago, IL - Eye
- 2004 Berliner Kunstsalon, Berlin
- 2003 Neue Galerie Graz am Landesmuseum Joanneum, Graz
- 2002 Museum of Contemporary Art-Chicago, Chicago, IL
- 2000 Feigen Contemporary, New York City, NY; Centre d’art Contemporain, Fribourg; Center for Curatorial Studies Annadale-on Hudson, NY; The Contemporary Arts Center, Cincinnati, OH
- 1999 Luckman Gallery, Los Angeles, CA; Centre d’ Art Neuchatel, Neuchatel, Switzerland; Neues Museum Weserburg, Bremen, Germany; Camerawork, London England; New Langton Arts, San Francisco, CA
- 1998 Galeria Pedro Oliveira, Porta; University of Wisconsin, Milwaukee, WI
- 1997 Walter Phillips Gallery, Banff Alberta, Canada; Kolnischer Kunstverein Cologne, Germany; Feigen Contemporary, New York City, NY; Christopher Grimes Gallery, Santa Monica, CA
- 1996 Christopher Grimes Gallery, Santa Monica, CA; Manfred Baumgartner Gallery, Washington, DC; Plug-In Gallery, Winnipeg, Manitoba, Canada; Museum of Contemporary Art-Chicago, Chicago, IL; The Renaissance Society at The University of Chicago, Chicago, IL; Ubu Gallery, New York City, NY
- 1995-1994 Exit Art, New York, NY; Christopher Grimes Gallery, Santa Monica, CA; Museum of Contemporary Art-Chicago, Chicago, IL; Feature Inc., New York City, NY
- 1993 Rhona Hoffman Gallery, Chicago, IL; Contemporary Arts Center, Cincinnati, OH
- 1992 Galleria Pedro Oliveira Porta, Portugal; Shedhalle, Zurich, Switzerland
- 1988 Daniel Weinberg Gallery, Los Angeles, CA
- 1987 Karsten Schubert, Ltd. London, England
- 1985 Rhona Hoffman Gallery, Chicago, IL

== Awards and honors ==
- The John Simon Guggenheim Fellowship Award
- The Louis Comfort Tiffany Foundation Award
- The Visual Artists Award, the Southeastern Center for Contemporary Art in Winston-Salem, N.C.
