= The Mask (video game) =

1995 video game

- Developer: Black Pearl Software
- Publishers: NA/EU: Black Pearl Software; JP: Virgin Interactive Entertainment
- Director: Steve Burke
- Producer: Steve Ryno
- Designers: Matthew Harmon; Todd Tomlinson; Dan Burke
- Programmer: Matthew C. Harmon
- Composer: Phil Crescenzo
- Platform: Super NES
- Release: NA: October 1995; EU: October 26, 1995; JP: December 27, 1996
- Genre: 2D action platformer
- Mode: Single-player

The Mask is a 1995 side-scrolling action video game developed and published by THQ subsidiary Black Pearl Software for the Super Nintendo Entertainment System which is based on the film of the same name. The film, in turn, was loosely based on the Dark Horse comic book series of the same name.

The game received moderately positive reviews from critics, who were particularly pleased with its faithful recreation of the humor and visual style of the film, while criticizing the level design and difficulty.

== Story ==
Mob boss Dorian Tyrell and his gang of rogues are secretly planning to take over Edge City, a small and prosperous city where the nightlife revolves around the wealthy patrons who attend the nightclub that Dorian owns and operates for the benefit of himself and his henchmen. Stanley Ipkiss, a mild mannered bank clerk who is unlucky and bullied transforms into the namesake character after discovering a green Loki mask. The Mask and Stanley must stop Dorian and his plan, and save Tina Carlyle- the woman that they both love.

== Gameplay ==
The Mask uses his huge "living" horn to defeat one of the enemies in the game.

The player has to navigate through Ipkiss' apartment, a high-rent district, outside and inside the bank, the local park, inside the local prison (complete with enemies wearing stereotypical striped prison uniforms), and finally through a ritzy nightclub to fight his evil nemesis, Dorian (who is also wearing the mask). All the major bosses in the game resemble characters from the film like Mrs. Peenman, the angry landlady, along with careless repairmen Irv and Burt Ripley, who repaired Ipkiss' vehicle.

If the player runs out of health, then he returns to being Ipkiss, wearing his pajamas. Many of The Mask's moves featured in the game were based on scenes in the movie, such as the mallet (in which he uses to smash the alarm clock from the first movie), the tornado, the massive guns he pulls from his pocket during the final confrontation during the first movie, and the huge "living" horn. It also features other moves, such as a sneaking move which makes The Mask invisible (his enemies do not see him), a dash move (as well as a "superdash" move where he runs at supersonic speed), and his primary attack which is a basic punch move with cartoon boxing gloves. Many of those special moves (the mallet, guns, horn, etc.) use The Mask's "Morph" power, which are replenished by power-ups. If his morph meter runs out it slowly replenishes to a smaller amount than that he started out with, much like the ammo replenishes for the main gun in Earthworm Jim.

The ending of the video game involves dancing with a 16-bit representation of Cameron Diaz accompanied by big band music. Cameron Diaz's breakthrough role was as Tina Carlyle (Dorian Tyrell's girlfriend) in the actual film.

== Development ==
Though the game is ostensibly based on the movie, the graphics were based on the cartoony style of the comic book rather than the movie. The game took longer to develop than anticipated, not being released until over a year after the movie's theatrical release.

The beta version of The Mask played more like a beat 'em up rather than a side-scrolling action game. Damage in the beta version came in a series of expressions, similar to the various faces used in the 1993 first-person shooter Doom. Different backgrounds were placed in the incomplete version that were scrapped in the retail version. Violent-looking attacks like a projectile-firing gun and a karate-style low kick were deleted from the final version.

A version of the game was also in development for the Sega Genesis but was canceled. According to a spokesperson, due to the Super NES version taking longer than expected, the Genesis version would not have been completed until two years after the film appeared in theaters, too late to significantly benefit from the license, and was cancelled because of this.

In one speedrun of the game, designer Matt Harmon said that a carnival-themed level was scrapped from the game.

== Reception ==
Reception

Review scores
Publication	Score
Electronic Gaming Monthly	7.5/10, 6.5/10, 6.5/10, 6.5/10
EP Daily	8.5/10
Famitsu	6/10, 5/10, 6/10, 4/10
Game Informer	5/10
Game Players	82%
GamesMaster	70/100
Hyper	78%
Next Generation	3/5
Official Nintendo Magazine	85/100
Super Play	70%
Total!	(UK) 82/100 (DE) 3+
Nintendo Magazine System	79/100
VideoGames	6/10

The Mask received generally favorable reviews from critics. Nintendo Power highlighted the character animations borrowed from the film and soundscapes, but considered the game's simplistic enemy AI and confusing maze areas to be negative points. Electronic Gaming Monthly's four editors commended the game's faithfulness to the humor and style of the source material, the variety of abilities, and the graphics, but criticized the levels for being too large. GamePro's Captain Squideo applauded the game for its heavy use of characters and visual gags from the film, as well as the Mask's many abilities, but said the enemy graphics and backgrounds were "closer to '93 standards than '95 potential". Next Generation expressed enthusiasm for the game's cartoony animations and secret ways to use backgrounds to move around the level, noting that "while the level mazes are, at times, too convoluted for their own good, they're certainly inventive".

Four reviewers in the Japanese magazine Famitsu said the game was typical of Western action games, saying it was suited for fans of those games. One reviewers said that its stages were long and drawn out with little to make it feel fresh.
