= Besselpark =

Park in Berlin, Germany

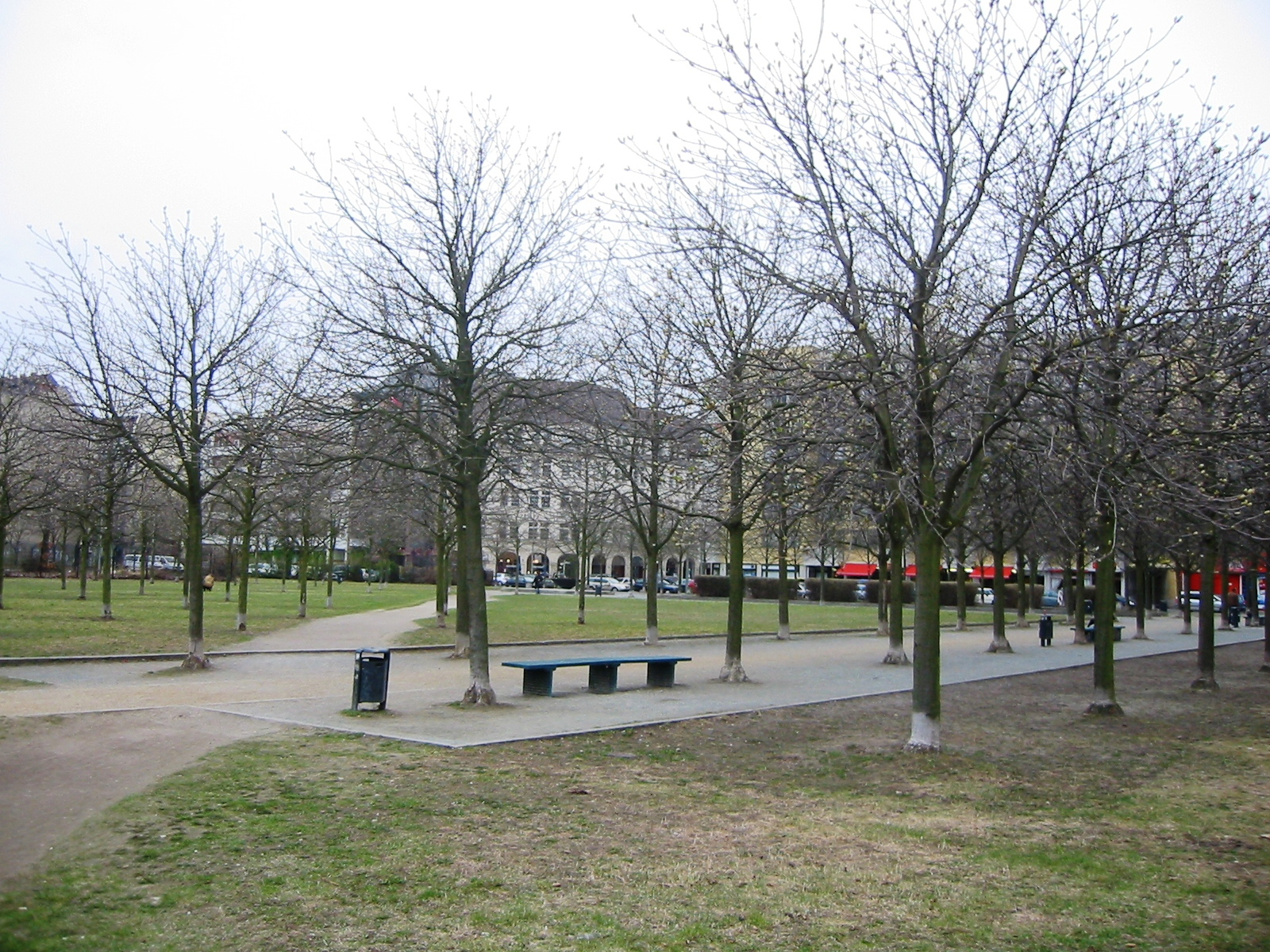
- The park in 2011
- Interactive map of Besselpark
- Type: Park
- Location: Kreuzberg
- Nearest city: Berlin, Germany
- Coordinates: 52.5038°N 13.3918°E

Besselpark is a park in Kreuzberg, Berlin, Germany, named after astronomer and mathematician Friedrich Bessel. The sculpture Tilted Donut Wedge with Two Balls is installed in the park.
