= Magaly Alabau =

Cuban-American poet, theater director, and actor

Magali Alabau (born 1945) is a Cuban-American poet, theater director, and actor. Born in Cienfuegos, Cuba, she has lived in New York since 1966. She co-founded the Spanish-English ensemble Teatro Dúo/Duo Theatre with Manuel Martín Jr. and the lesbian theater Medusa's Revenge with Ana María Simo. She began writing poetry after retiring from theater, and published eight books between 1986 and 2015.

== Biography ==
=== Early life in Cuba ===
Alabau was born in 1945 in Cienfuegos, Cuba.

Following the Cuban Revolution, she received a government scholarship to study theater at the Escuela Nacional de Arte de Cubanacán (National Art School) in Havana. After three and a half years, she was expelled along with a group of students on suspicion of homosexuality. They decided to form the theater group Teatro Joven and staged Abelardo Estorino's one-act play Los Mangos de Caín. It premiered in the auditorium of the University of Architecture (Havana) on August 15, 1965. Shortly before the planned third performance of the piece, the Executive Bureau of the Young Communist League shut the show down. Under the increasing homophobia and cultural intolerance, Alabau left Cuba for the United States.

=== Theater in New York ===
Alabau left Cuba through the help of her friend Inverna Lockpez and her mother, who claimed Alabau as a foster daughter. She received an exit permit in 1966 and traveled to Miami through the Freedom Flights. They settled in New York City, where she continued her theater training and worked as an actor and director. She also studied religion and philosophy at Hunter College. She acted in productions at INTAR, Greenwich Mews Theater, and La MaMa Experimental Theatre Club. She also directed theater.

In 1969, she partnered with Manuel Martín, Jr. to co-found the bilingual theater project Teatro Dúo/Duo Theatre, one of the first Spanish-American theater companies in New York. In January and February 1973, when Teatro Dúo/Duo Theatre mounted a bilingual production of Tom Eyen's The White Whore and the Bit Player (in Spanish: La Estrella y la Monja), Alabau played the role of La Estrella. In the English-language version of the same production, that role was played by Candy Darling. When the company staged Martin's Francesco: The Life And Times Of The Cencis later that year at La MaMa, Alabau played the role of Beatrice Cenci. In 1974, she appeared in Ahmed Yacoubi's The Night Before Thinking, directed by Ozzie Rodriguez. In 1981, Alabau appeared in La MaMa's production of Jose Triano's The Night of the Assassins, directed by Endre Hules.

In 1976, wanting to create a lesbian community space, she co-founded the lesbian theater Medusa's Revenge with Ana María Simo. Medusa's Revenge was the first lesbian theater in New York City.

=== Poetry ===
In the mid-1980s, Alabau retired from theater and devoted herself to poetry. In 1986, she debuted with the poetry anthology Electra y Clitemnestra. In the book, she reinterprets the Greek myths of Clytemnestra and Electra, transforming the context from heterosexual to lesbian. Central themes in her poetry include intimacy, eroticism, and lesbian love. Her collection Volver (2012) deals with her exile and her relationship to her homeland of Cuba.

After living for 28 years in Manhattan, she moved to Woodstock in upstate New York in 1996. She retired from the literary world and devoted herself to the rescue of abandoned pets. In 2009, she began writing poems again.

=== Feminist Work ===
Magaly Alabau's works were analyzed with regard to their affiliation to the concepts of feminist and lesbian literary criticism because of her focus on such aspects as gender, sexuality, and exile. According to Elena M. Martínez, the author reshapes and rewrites classical myths as a means to subvert patriarchal tradition and develop a new concept of what agency in female identity might look like. By creating such characters as Electra and Clytemnestra, Martínez claims that Alabau introduces a new perspective on female identity by depicting them not as agents of social life but of their own personal interests and passions. Thus, she destroys the existing traditional framework of female passivity and reshapes myths accordingly. At the same time, such an innovative approach allows her to introduce lesbian desire into the poem because of substituting heteronormative structures with relationships between two women.

Besides, when analyzing lesbian literature, Martínez emphasizes the connection between lesbian identity and exiles as an example of marginalization and displacement. Thus, as noted by Isabel Alvarez Borland in her review of Martínez's book, lesbian identity becomes one of the forms of exile for the poet, which includes repression, invisibility, creation of alternative spaces of community.

Thus, when looking at Alabau's works from the perspective of scholars' analysis, it can be stated that her poetry is an integral part of feminist literary discussion in Latin America. The author questions heteronormative assumptions about women's identity and develops her own narrative in which the lives and problems of lesbian women become the center. Scholarship on Alabau’s post-2009 work remains limited, and existing criticism has primarily focused on her earlier poetry collections.

== Selected works (poetry) ==
- Electra y Clitemnestra. Poema. New York: Maitén Books, 1986. OCLC 253975578
- La extremaunción diaria. Madrid: Gedichtband, Rondas, 1986.
- Ras. New York: Medusa, 1987. OCLC 17246591
- Hermana. Madrid: Betania, 1989. ISBN 84-86662-96-6.
- Hemos llegado a Ilión. Madrid: Betania, 1991. ISBN 84-86662-91-5.
- Liebe. Coral Gables: La Torre de Papel, 1993. OCLC 29666248
- Dos mujeres. Madrid: Betania, 2011. ISBN 8480173025
- Volver. Madrid: Betania, 2012. ISBN 8480173130
- Aqui Litoral, no. 215/216 (1997): 205–6.

Amor fatal, Madrid: Betania, 2016 Ir y Venir: Bokeh Mordazas: Bokeh 2017

== Awards and recognition ==
- First prize in Lyra's Magazine poetry contest, 1988
- Cintas Fellowship, 1990
- Latin American Institute Writers Poetry prize for best Spanish-language poetry book for Hermana, 1992
