= Manuel Martín Jr. =

American dramatist

- Born: December 16, 1934; Artemisa, Cuba
- Died: September 28, 2000 (aged 65); New York City
- Education: Escuela Profesional de Comercio, Artemisa, Cuba; Hunter College, New York
- Occupations: Theater director, playwright
- Awards: Cintas Fellowship for Literature (1985); New York Foundation Award for Playwriting (1986, 1987, 1991); Fulbright Fellowship for Playwriting (1987)

Manuel Martín Jr. (December 16, 1934 - September 28, 2000) was a Cuban theatre director.

== Biography ==
Manuel Martín Jr. was born December 16, 1934, in Artemisa, Cuba. He attended La Inmaculada Concepción Grammar School and the Escuela Pública No. 1 in Artemisa, and completed three years at the Escuela Profesional de Comercio. He left Cuba for the United States on October 27, 1956, and graduated from Hunter College in Manhattan with a bachelor's degree in theater and film.

Martín founded Teatro Duo/Duo Theatre with Magaly Alabau in New York City in 1969. The theater was dedicated to producing works in both English and Spanish. In January 1973, Teatro Duo performed in a bilingual production, directed by Martín, of Tom Eyen's White Whore and the Bit Player / La Estella y La Monja at La MaMa Experimental Theatre Club. The Spanish version featured Alabau as La Estrella and Graciela Mas as La Monja, and the English version featured Candy Darling as the whore and Hortensia Colorado as the nun. Martín directed the same production in February 1973 at the Theatre at St. Clement's.

In June 1973, Martín directed Teatro Duo in his play Francesco: The Life and Times of the Cencis. The work-in-progress production featured music by Cuban composer Enrique Ubieta and performances by Martín, Alabau, Hortensia Colorado, and Graciela Mas, among others.

In addition to his directing, Martín is best known as the playwright of Rita and Bessie, Swallows, and Union City Thanksgiving, the latter of which was published in a Cuban theatre anthology by the Department of Cultural Affairs, Madrid, Spain, in 1992. His plays have been produced at the Latino Festival, New York Shakespeare Festival, INTAR, and La MaMa.

He received a Cintas Fellowship for literature in 1985; the New York Foundation for the Arts award for playwriting in 1986, 1987, and 1991; and a Fulbright Fellowship for playwriting in 1987. He was a member of the INTAR Playwrights in Residence Laboratory in New York.

In 1992, he was translator and adapter for the Colgate-Palmolive program "Dr. Goodmouth", through the UniWorld Group. His children's play with music, The Legend of the Golden Coffee Bean, was included in ¡Aplauso!, an anthology of Hispanic children's theater (Arte Público Press, 1995). Martín instructed drama workshops in New York and in Puerto Rico, and presented at conferences in New York, Miami, and Paris.

He lived in New York City until his death on September 28, 2000.
