= Eye (sculpture) =

Sculptures of a large eye

- Eye in Dallas in 2014

- Artist: Tony Tasset
- Completion date: 2007
- Medium: Fiberglass, resin, steel, oil paint
- Movement: Pop art
- Subject: A human eye
- Location: St. Louis, Missouri
- 38.54972°N 90.41511°W
- Owner: Laumeier Sculpture Park

Second sculpture in Dallas 32°46′53″N 96°47′54″W Eye (DFW)

Eye is the title of two sculptures by American artist Tony Tasset. They are large eyes with blue irises and made of fiberglass, resin, and steel detailed with oil paint. The first was made in 2007 with a diameter of 12 feet (3.7 m) and is located in Laumeier Sculpture Park in St. Louis, Missouri. The second was made in 2010 at a diameter of 30 feet (9.1 m) and currently resides in Dallas, Texas on grounds owned by The Joule Hotel.

== History ==
The sculptures were created by Tony Tasset and are a replica of his own eye. He says that there is no deep meaning behind the eye and that he wanted to create something that would be recognizable to many people. The first instance of the piece became a permanent fixture of Laumeier Sculpture Park following a solo exhibition of Tasset's work at Laumeier in 2007. The later, much larger version was commissioned by the Chicago Loop Alliance and displayed in Chicago's Jay Pritzker Pavilion in 2010, and appeared at Laumeier Sculpture Park in 2011. In 2013 it was moved to Dallas after it was bought by The Joule Hotel for its art collection, taking about a week and a half to construct. Since then, it has been used as a centerpiece for private events and is the site of the Dallas Art Fair's ending party, The Eye Ball. Its weight is 18,000 pounds (8,200 kg).
