= 4th Annual Blockbuster Entertainment Awards =

- Sponsored by: Blockbuster LLC
- Date: March 10, 1998
- Location: Pantages Theatre
- Country: USA

Highlights
- Most awards: Nicolas Cage
- Film: Winners hold in bold
- Music: Winners hold in bold
- Video Games: Wasn't taking part bold

Television/radio coverage
- Network: UPN
- Viewership: 11 million
- Produced by: Cort Casady; Angela Fairhurst; Michael Levitt
- Directed by: Bruce Gowers

The 4th Blockbuster Entertainment Awards were held on March 10, 1998 at the Pantages Theater in Los Angeles. Below is a complete list of nominees and winners. Winners are highlighted in bold.

== Film ==
=== Favorite Actor – Action/Adventure ===
- **Nicolas Cage**, Face/Off & Con Air
- Harrison Ford, Air Force One
- John Travolta, Face/Off

=== Favorite Actress – Action/Adventure ===
- **Linda Hamilton**, Dante's Peak
- Nicole Kidman, The Peacemaker
- Jennifer Lopez, Anaconda

=== Favorite Actor – Comedy ===
- **Jim Carrey**, Liar Liar
- Kevin Kline, In & Out
- Mike Myers, Austin Powers

=== Favorite Actress – Comedy ===
- **Julia Roberts**, My Best Friend's Wedding
- Joan Cusack, In & Out
- Elizabeth Hurley, Austin Powers

=== Favorite Actor – Drama ===
- **Leonardo DiCaprio**, Titanic
- Matt Damon, John Grisham's The Rainmaker
- Matthew McConaughey, Contact

=== Favorite Actress – Drama ===
- **Kate Winslet**, Titanic
- Jodie Foster, Contact
- Madonna, Evita

=== Favorite Actor – Horror ===
- **David Arquette**, Scream 2
- Freddie Prinze Jr., I Know What You Did Last Summer
- Tom Sizemore, The Relic

=== Favorite Actress – Horror ===
- **Neve Campbell**, Scream 2
- Courteney Cox, Scream 2
- Jennifer Love Hewitt, I Know What You Did Last Summer

=== Favorite Actor – Science Fiction ===
- **Will Smith**, Men in Black
- Jeff Goldblum, The Lost World: Jurassic Park
- Tommy Lee Jones, Men in Black

=== Favorite Actress – Science Fiction ===
- **Uma Thurman**, Batman & Robin
- Julianne Moore, The Lost World: Jurassic Park
- Sigourney Weaver, Alien Resurrection

=== Favorite Actor – Suspense ===
- **Mel Gibson**, Conspiracy Theory
- Morgan Freeman, Kiss the Girls
- Bruce Willis, The Jackal

=== Favorite Actress – Suspense ===
- **Julia Roberts**, Conspiracy Theory
- Ashley Judd, Kiss the Girls
- Elisabeth Shue, The Saint

=== Favorite Actor – Newcomer ===
- **Howard Stern**, Private Parts
- Casper Van Dien, Starship Troopers
- Michael Jai White, Spawn

=== Favorite Actress – Newcomer ===
- **Jennifer Love Hewitt**, I Know What You Did Last Summer
- Milla Jovovich, The Fifth Element
- Denise Richards, Starship Troopers

=== Family Animated Favorite ===
- **Anastasia**
- Cats Don't Dance
- Hercules

=== Family Favorite ===
- **Tim Allen**, Jungle 2 Jungle
- Brendan Fraser, George of the Jungle
- Robin Williams, Flubber

=== Favorite Supporting Actor – Action/Adventure ===
- **John Cusack**, Con Air
- Alessandro Nivola, Face/Off
- Gary Oldman, Air Force One

=== Favorite Supporting Actress – Action/Adventure ===
- **Glenn Close**, Air Force One
- Joan Allen, Face/Off
- Rachel Ticotin, Con Air

=== Favorite Supporting Actor – Comedy ===
- **Rupert Everett**, My Best Friend's Wedding
- Justin Cooper, Liar Liar
- Tom Selleck, In & Out

=== Favorite Supporting Actress – Comedy ===
- **Cameron Diaz**, My Best Friend's Wedding
- Debbie Reynolds, In & Out
- Jennifer Tilly, Liar Liar

=== Favorite Supporting Actor – Drama ===
- **Billy Zane**, Titanic
- Danny DeVito, John Grisham's The Rainmaker
- Tom Skerritt, Contact

=== Favorite Supporting Actress – Drama ===
- **Kathy Bates**, Titanic
- Claire Danes, John Grisham's The Rainmaker
- Charlize Theron, The Devil's Advocate

=== Favorite Supporting Actor – Horror ===
- **Jamie Kennedy**, Scream 2
- John Leguizamo, Spawn
- Ryan Phillippe, I Know What You Did Last Summer

=== Favorite Supporting Actress – Horror ===
- **Sarah Michelle Gellar**, I Know What You Did Last Summer
- Jada Pinkett, Scream 2
- Theresa Randle, Spawn

=== Favorite Supporting Actor – Science Fiction ===
- **Chris O'Donnell**, Batman & Robin
- Vincent D'Onofrio, Men in Black
- Arnold Schwarzenegger, Batman & Robin

=== Favorite Supporting Actress – Science Fiction ===
- **Winona Ryder**, Alien Resurrection
- Linda Fiorentino, Men in Black
- Alicia Silverstone, Batman & Robin

=== Favorite Supporting Actor – Suspense ===
- **Patrick Stewart**, Conspiracy Theory
- Cary Elwes, Kiss the Girls
- Sidney Poitier, The Jackal

=== Favorite Supporting Actress – Suspense ===
- **Kathleen Quinlan**, Breakdown
- Judy Davis, Absolute Power
- Diane Venora, The Jackal

=== Filmmaker Award ===
- **Robert Duvall**

=== World Artist Award ===
- **Arnold Schwarzenegger**

== Music ==
=== Favorite CD ===
- **Jewel**, Pieces of You
- Spice Girls, Spice
- The Wallflowers, Bringing Down the Horse

=== Favorite Duo/Group – Country ===
- **Brooks & Dunn**, Greatest Hits Collection
- Alabama, Dancin' on the Boulevard
- Sawyer Brown, Six Days on the Road

=== Favorite Female – Country ===
- **LeAnn Rimes**, Unchained Melody: The Early Years
- Shania Twain, Come On Over
- Trisha Yearwood, (Songbook) A Collection of Hits

=== Favorite Male – Country ===
- **Garth Brooks**, Sevens
- Tim McGraw, Everywhere
- George Strait, Carrying Your Love With Me

=== Favorite Female – R&B ===
- **Janet Jackson**, The Velvet Rope
- Erykah Badu, Baduizm
- Mary J. Blige, Share My World

=== Favorite Group – R&B ===
- **Boyz II Men**, Evolution
- En Vogue, EV3
- God's Property, God's Property from Kirk Franklin's Nu Nation

=== Favorite Male – Rap ===
- **Puff Daddy**, No Way Out
- Master P, Ghetto D
- Notorious B.I.G., Life After Death

=== Favorite Group – Rap ===
- **Bone Thugs-N-Harmony**, The Art of War
- Lost Boyz, Love, Peace & Nappiness
- Wu-Tang Clan, Wu-Tang Forever

=== Favorite Group – Classic Rock ===
- **Aerosmith**, Nine Lives
- Fleetwood Mac, The Dance
- Rolling Stones, Bridges to Babylon

=== Favorite Group – Modern Rock ===
- **Sugar Ray**, Floored
- Live, Secret Samadhi
- Prodigy, The Fat of the Land

=== Favorite Soundtrack ===
- **Men in Black**
- Evita
- The Preacher's Wife

=== Favorite Group – Pop ===
- **Spice Girls**, Spice/Spiceworld
- Hanson, Middle of Nowhere
- U2, Pop

=== Favorite Female – Pop ===
- **Mariah Carey**, Butterfly
- Celine Dion, Let's Talk About Love
- Sarah McLachlan, Surfacing

=== Favorite Group – New Artist ===
- **Matchbox 20**, Yourself or Someone Like You
- Hanson, Middle of Nowhere
- Spice Girls, Spice

=== Favorite Male – New Artist ===
- **Puff Daddy**, No Way Out
- Bob Carlisle, Butterfly Kisses
- Mase, Harlem World

=== Favorite Female – New Artist ===
- **Meredith Brooks**, Blurring the Edges
- Erykah Badu, Baduizm
- Missy "Misdemeanor" Elliott, Supa Dupa Fly
