= Michael Pritchard (comedian) =

American comedian (born 1949–1950)

- Occupations: Stand-up comedian; youth counselor

Michael Pritchard (born 1949 or 1950) is an American stand-up comedian, youth counselor, and advocate of social emotional learning (SEL). He speaks to schools, parent groups, and corporations on the topics of communication skills, diversity, bullying, and conflict resolution. A presentation that he made at Benicia (California) Middle School was featured in the 2011 Roko Belic documentary film Happy.

== Early life ==
Pritchard grew up in Missouri and was the youngest of four brothers. His father was a pump salesman, and his mother a teacher. While in Missouri, he received a degree in social science.

== Career ==
Pritchard was a U.S. Army medic during the Vietnam War. In the 1970s, he worked as a youth counselor and was named the 1980 California Probation Officer of the Year by the California Probation, Parole, and Correctional Association. After winning first place at the 1980 San Francisco International Comedy Competition, he briefly worked in show business, appearing in an episode of Taxi and working as a voice actor in some Star Wars films, Disneyland's Captain EO, and Sesame Street. In 1983, he began making presentations in school assemblies. In April 2000, the first anniversary of the Columbine shootings, his television series Saving Our Schools from Hate and Violence (SOS) was aired on KQED-TV and distributed to other PBS stations. His television series LifeSteps, filmed in 1992, appeared on PBS stations in the early 1990s, which divided into several subseries, You Can Choose aimed at elementary-school students, Big Changes, Big Choices aimed at middle-school students, and The Power of Choice, aimed at high-school students.

== Recent projects ==
Pritchard works with Special Affects, an organization that uses documentary films to tell the stories of people with special needs and has created an introductory video for the organization's web site. On April 2, 2013, Pritchard attended the Light It Up Blue event in Novato, California, commemorating Autism Awareness Month, and posed for a photo with children who were there.

On November 6, 2013, Pritchard was scheduled to appear, as "Chairman of the 'Joint Chiefs of Laffs'", at a San Jose (California) fund-raising event for Walking Point Foundation, an organization that mentors veterans of the Iraq and Afghanistan wars, who have post traumatic stress disorder and traumatic brain injuries, in expression through writing and the visual and performing arts. The Walking Point Foundation web site lists Prichard as one of its mentors.

== Personal life ==
Pritchard, who (as of May 2003) lives in San Rafael, California, is married to Mary Jo Pritchard. The couple has three children. He is a practicing Catholic.

== Bibliography ==
=== Books ===
- Listen to What Your Kids Aren't Telling You (with Dan Spencer) ISBN 978-1411622463

=== Videos ===
- Stepping on Up (4-DVD series)
- LifeSteps (12-DVD series, 2003)
- Saving Our Schools from Hate and Violence (set of 2 videos, 2000)
- You Can Choose! (10 Part Series for Elementary Schools,1992)
- Coping With Pressures (VHS tape, 1988)
