= I Am (2010 American documentary film) =

- Directed by: Tom Shadyac
- Written by: Tom Shadyac
- Produced by: Jennifer Abbott; Dagan Handy
- Narrated by: Tom Shadyac
- Cinematography: Roko Belic
- Edited by: Jennifer Abbott
- Production companies: Homemande Canvas Productions; Shady Acres
- Distributed by: Flying Eye Productions (North America); Universal Pictures (International)
- Release date: October 2010
- Running time: 76 minutes
- Country: United States
- Language: English

I Am is a 2010 American documentary film written, directed, and narrated by Tom Shadyac. The film asks the question: "What is wrong with the world, and what can we do about it?", and explores Shadyac's personal journey after a bicycling accident in 2007 which led him to the answers "the nature of humanity", "the world's ever-growing addiction to materialism", and "human connections". Shot with Shadyac and a team of four, the film contrasts sharply with the director's most notable comedic works, such as Ace Ventura: Pet Detective (1994), Liar Liar (1997), and Bruce Almighty (2003), all of which starred Jim Carrey.

== Background ==
Tom Shadyac suffered post-concussion syndrome after a bicycle accident in Virginia in 2007, experiencing months of acute headaches and hyper-sensitivity to light and noise. He slept in a closet due to chronic tinnitus that lasted more than six months. It was this constant ringing that the doctors could not treat that led him to suicidal thoughts. The injury followed the cumulative effects of previous mild head injuries Shadyac had suffered surfing, mountain biking and playing basketball.

In 2011, a New York Times article stated that "the symptoms of a concussion [didn't] go away. Something as simple as a trip to the grocery store was painful for Shadyac, whose brain was unable to filter various stimuli. Shadyac subsequently gave away his excess fortune, opening a homeless shelter in Charlottesville, Virginia and making a key donation to Telluride, Colorado's effort to set aside a natural area at the town's entrance. He reoriented and simplified his life, sold his 17,000-square-foot (1,600 m^{2}) Los Angeles mansion and moved into a trailer park – albeit the exclusive Paradise Cove park in Malibu. As medical treatments failed to help, he isolated himself completely, sleeping in his closet and walling the windows of his mobile home with black-out curtains. Later, as his symptoms finally began to subside, the director wanted to share his inner quest in the way he knew best: through film." Shadyac linked the experience to Dante's Seventh Circle of Hell.

== Film context ==
In the film, Shadyac conducts interviews with scientists, religious leaders, environmentalists and philosophers including Desmond Tutu, Noam Chomsky, Lynne McTaggart, Elisabet Sahtouris, David Suzuki, Howard Zinn, and Thom Hartmann. The film asks two central questions: What’s Wrong With the World? and What Can We Do About it?. It is about "human connectedness, happiness, and the human spirit", and explores themes including Darwinism, Western mores, loneliness, the economy, and the drive to war. The documentary includes animated scenes explaining scientific concepts, as well as clips from the films Wall Street and It's a Wonderful Life.

Proceeds from the documentary went to the Foundation for I Am, which supports various charities.

== Reception ==
On Rotten Tomatoes, the film has an approval rating of 36% based on 47 reviews, with an average rating of 5.16/10. The website's critical consensus reads, "I Am is undeniably well-meaning - and unfortunately proof that a filmmaker's best intentions aren't enough to guarantee a worthwhile viewing experience." On Metacritic the film has a score of 38 out of 100, based on 18 critics, indicating "generally unfavorable" reviews.

The Los Angeles Times said the film was "a collection of sound bites that validate the filmmaker's point of view. What lifts the film above its dubious boilerplate assemblage of talking heads and archival images is Shadyac himself. With his gentle, self-mocking humor, he comes across as an exceptionally mellow, earnest and likable guy." Film critic Roger Ebert gave the film a mixed review, awarding the film two stars out of four and stating that "the film is often absurd and never less than giddy with uplift, but that's not to say it's bad. I watched with an incredulous delight, and at the end, I liked Tom Shadyac quite a lot...he offers us this hopeful if somewhat undigested cut of his findings, in a film as watchable as a really good TV commercial, and just as deep."

== See also ==
- Materialism (economic)
- Materialism (physical)
