= John Debney =

American film composer (born 1956)

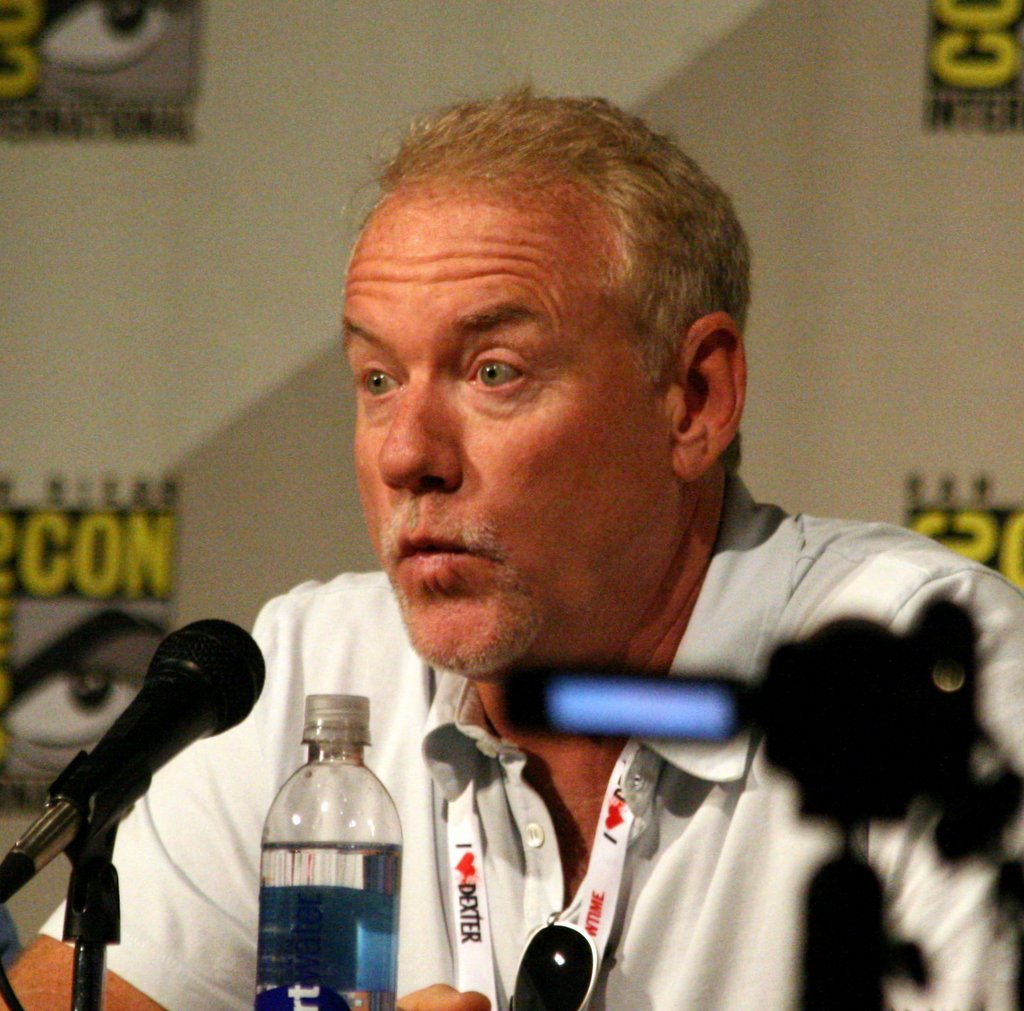
- Debney at the 2013 San Diego Comic-Con

Background information
- Born: John Cardon Debney; August 18, 1956 (age 70); Glendale, California, U.S.
- Genres: Film scores; soundtracks
- Occupations: Composer; conductor
- Instruments: Piano; guitar
- Years active: 1974–present
- Website: johndebney.com

John Cardon Debney (born August 18, 1956) is an American composer and conductor of film, television, and video game scores. His work encompasses a variety of mediums and genres like comedy, horror, science fiction, thriller, fantasy, and action-adventure. He is a long-time collaborator of Disney and has written music for their films, television series, and theme parks. He has frequently collaborated with film directors Brian Robbins, Jon Favreau, Garry Marshall, Tom Shadyac, Peter Hyams, Mark Dindal, and Brad Anderson.

Debney has been the recipient of three Primetime Emmy Awards and was nominated for an Academy Award for his score for Mel Gibson's The Passion of the Christ (2004).

== Career ==
After ending his career with Disney, John Debney worked for Mike Post. Debney furthered his hands-on training working with Hanna-Barbera composer Hoyt Curtin. Then Debney scored television projects including Disneyland, Star Trek: The Next Generation, Star Trek: Deep Space Nine, SeaQuest DSV, A Pup Named Scooby-Doo, The Cape, The Lazarus Man, Piggsburg Pigs!, The Further Adventures of SuperTed, Doctor Who, Cagney & Lacey, Tiny Toon Adventures, The Young Riders, The New Yogi Bear Show, Police Academy: The Animated Series, Fame, Captain Power and the Soldiers of the Future, Dragon's Lair, Freshman Dorm, Pop Quiz, and Dink, the Little Dinosaur, for which he won an Emmy for Best Main Title.

In the early 1990s, Debney began to score indie films and Disneyland attractions. In 1991, Debney composed the music for Phantom Manor and It's a Small World (also used at Disneyland from 1993 to 2002) in Disneyland Paris and SpectroMagic at Magic Kingdom. In 1993, he scored his first studio feature, the Disney comedy Hocus Pocus starring Bette Midler. In 1994, Debney wrote Friends Forever with Greg Scelsa from Greg & Steve's album We All Live Together, Vol. 5.

Debney has since composed scores for Cats & Dogs, The Passion of the Christ, Bruce Almighty, I Know What You Did Last Summer, Elf, Sin City, Chicken Little, Liar Liar, Spy Kids, The Scorpion King, The Princess Diaries, Predators, and other films.

He has also composed scores for Lair and The Sims Medieval, both video games. In 2010, he composed the theme music for the Nickelodeon television series Supah Ninjas. He composed some of Disney Parks's Nighttime Spectaculars including World Of Color Celebrate! in Disney California Adventure, The Magic, The Memories And You!, Celebrate the Magic in Walt Disney World Magic Kingdom, and Celebrate! Tokyo Disneyland in Tokyo Disneyland in addition to an arrangement of "When You Wish Upon a Star" as a fanfare (the music played when the Walt Disney Pictures logo was shown) from 1985 to 2006.

== Filmography ==
=== Film ===
==== 1980s ====
| Year | Title | Director(s) | Studio(s) | Notes |
|---|---|---|---|---|
| 1987 | The Wild Pair | Beau Bridges | Trans World Entertainment | Composed with Michel Colombier |
| 1988 | The Further Adventures of Tennessee Buck | David Keith | Trans World Entertainment | —N/a |
| 1988 | Seven Hours to Judgment | Beau Bridges | Trans World Entertainment | —N/a |
| 1988 | Not Since Casanova | Brett Thompson | The Brett Thompson Company; West Productions | —N/a |
| 1989 | Trenchcoat in Paradise | Martha Coolidge | Finnegan/Pinchuk Productions; MGM Television | —N/a |

==== 1990s ====
| Year | Title | Director(s) | Studio(s) | Notes |
|---|---|---|---|---|
| 1990 | Jetsons: The Movie | William Hanna; Joseph Barbera | Universal Pictures; Hanna-Barbera Productions | Debney's first score for an animated film |
| 1993 | Hocus Pocus | Kenny Ortega | Walt Disney Pictures | —N/a |
| 1994 | Gunmen | Deran Sarafian | Dimension Films (North America); Columbia TriStar Film Distributors International (International); LIVE Entertainment; Davis Entertainment; Gray Gunmen Productions | —N/a |
| 1994 | White Fang 2: Myth of the White Wolf | Ken Olin | Walt Disney Pictures | —N/a |
| 1994 | Little Giants | Duwayne Dunham | Warner Bros. Pictures; Amblin Entertainment | —N/a |
| 1995 | Chameleon | Michael Pavone | Rysher Entertainment | Direct-to-video |
| 1995 | Houseguest | Randall Miller | Hollywood Pictures; Caravan Pictures | —N/a |
| 1995 | Runaway Brain | Chris Bailey | Walt Disney Pictures; Walt Disney Feature Animation | Short film |
| 1995 | Cutthroat Island | Renny Harlin | MGM/UA Distribution Co. Carolco Pictures; Cutthroat Productions | —N/a |
| 1995 | Sudden Death | Peter Hyams | Universal Pictures; Shattered Productions | —N/a |
| 1996 | Getting Away with Murder | Harvey Miller | Savoy Pictures | —N/a |
| 1996 | Carpool | Arthur Hiller | Warner Bros. Pictures; Regency Enterprises | —N/a |
| 1997 | The Relic | Peter Hyams | Paramount Pictures; Cloud Nine Entertainment; PolyGram Filmed Entertainment; Marubeni; Toho-Towa; Tele München Group; BBC Film; Pacific Western Productions | —N/a |
| 1997 | Liar Liar | Tom Shadyac | Universal Pictures; Imagine Entertainment | Themes by James Newton Howard |
| 1997 | I Know What You Did Last Summer | Jim Gillespie | Columbia Pictures; Mandalay Entertainment | —N/a |
| 1998 | Paulie | John Roberts | DreamWorks Pictures; Mutual Film Company | Nominated- IFMCA Award for Best Original Score for a Comedy Film |
| 1998 | I'll Be Home for Christmas | Arlene Sanford | Walt Disney Pictures; Mandeville Films | —N/a |
| 1999 | My Favorite Martian | Donald Petrie | Walt Disney Pictures | —N/a |
| 1999 | Lost & Found | Jeff Pollack | Warner Bros. Pictures; Alcon Entertainment | —N/a |
| 1999 | Inspector Gadget | David Kellogg | Walt Disney Pictures; Caravan Pictures; DIC Entertainment; Avnet/Kerner Productions; Roger Birnbaum Productions | —N/a |
| 1999 | Dick | Andrew Fleming | Columbia Pictures; Phoenix Pictures | —N/a |
| 1999 | Komodo | Michael Lantieri | Scanbox Entertainment | —N/a |
| 1999 | The Adventures of Elmo in Grouchland | Gary Halvorson | Columbia Pictures; Jim Henson Pictures; Children's Television Workshop | —N/a |
| 1999 | End of Days | Peter Hyams | Universal Pictures (North America); Buena Vista International (International); Beacon Pictures | —N/a |

==== 2000s ====
| Year | Title | Director(s) | Studio(s) | Notes |
|---|---|---|---|---|
| 2000 | Michael Jordan to the Max | James D. Stern; Don Kempf | Giant Screen Films | Documentary film |
| 2000 | Relative Values | Eric Styles | Alliance Atlantis Communications; Starz Encore Entertainment | —N/a |
| 2000 | The Replacements | Howard Deutch | Warner Bros. Pictures; Bel Air Entertainment | —N/a |
| 2000 | The Emperor's New Groove | Mark Dindal | Walt Disney Pictures; Walt Disney Feature Animation | Nominated- Annie Award for Music in a Feature Production |
| 2001 | See Spot Run | John Whitesell | Warner Bros. Pictures; Village Roadshow Pictures; NPV Entertainment; Robert Simonds Productions | —N/a |
| 2001 | Heartbreakers | David Mirkin | Metro-Goldwyn-Mayer; Davis Entertainment; Winchester Films | Themes by Danny Elfman |
| 2001 | Spy Kids | Robert Rodriguez | Dimension Films; Troublemaker Studios | Composed with Danny Elfman, Heitor Pereira, Robert Rodriguez, Los Lobos, Gavin Greenaway, and Harry Gregson-Williams |
| 2001 | Cats & Dogs | Lawrence Guterman | Warner Bros. Pictures; Cat Fight Pictures; Village Roadshow Pictures; NPV Entertainment; Mad Chance; Zide/Perry Productions | —N/a |
| 2001 | The Princess Diaries | Garry Marshall | Walt Disney Pictures; BrownHouse Productions | —N/a |
| 2001 | Jimmy Neutron: Boy Genius | John A. Davis | Paramount Pictures; Nickelodeon Movies; O Entertainment; DNA Productions | —N/a |
| 2002 | Snow Dogs | Brian Levant | Walt Disney Pictures; The Kerner Entertainment Company | —N/a |
| 2002 | Dragonfly | Tom Shadyac | Universal Pictures (North America); Spyglass Entertainment(International; through Buena Vista International) | —N/a |
| 2002 | The Scorpion King | Chuck Russell | Universal Pictures; WWE Entertainment; Alphaville Films; Misher Films | —N/a |
| 2002 | Spy Kids 2: The Island of Lost Dreams | Robert Rodriguez | Dimension Films; Troublemaker Studios | Composed with Robert Rodriguez |
| 2002 | Swimfan | John Polson | 20th Century Fox; GreeneStreet Films; Cobalt Media Group; Furthur Films | Composed with Louis Febre |
| 2002 | The Tuxedo | Kevin Donovan | DreamWorks Pictures; Blue Train Productions; Parkes/MacDonald Productions | Composed with Christophe Beck |
| 2002 | The Hot Chick | Tom Brady | Touchstone Pictures; Happy Madison Productions | —N/a |
| 2003 | Most | Bobby Garabedian | —N/a | Short film |
| 2003 | Malibu's Most Wanted | John Whitesell | Warner Bros. Pictures; Karz Entertainment | Composed with John Van Tongeren |
| 2003 | Bruce Almighty | Tom Shadyac | Universal Pictures (United States); Buena Vista International (international); Spyglass Entertainment; Shady Acres Entertainment; Pit Bull Productions | —N/a |
| 2003 | Elf | Jon Favreau | New Line Cinema; Guy Walks Into a Bar Productions | —N/a |
| 2003 | Looney Tunes: Back in Action | Joe Dante | Warner Bros. Pictures; Warner Bros. Feature Animation; Baltimore Spring Creek Productions; Goldmann Pictures | Additional music (score for final reel of the film); Main score composed by Jerry Goldsmith |
| 2004 | Welcome to Mooseport | Donald Petrie | 20th Century Fox; Intermedia Films | —N/a |
| 2004 | The Passion of the Christ | Mel Gibson | Icon Productions; Newmarket Films | Nominated-Academy Award for Best Original Score; Nominated-IFMCA Award for Best Original Score for a Drama Film |
| 2004 | The Whole Ten Yards | Howard Deutch | Warner Bros. Pictures; Franchise Pictures; Cheyenne Enterprises; MHF Zweite Academy Film | —N/a |
| 2004 | Raising Helen | Garry Marshall | Touchstone Pictures; Beacon Pictures; Hyde Park Entertainment; Mandeville Films | —N/a |
| 2004 | Spider-Man 2 | Sam Raimi | Columbia Pictures; Marvel Enterprises; Laura Ziskin Productions | Additional music Score composed by Danny Elfman |
| 2004 | The Princess Diaries 2: Royal Engagement | Garry Marshall | Walt Disney Pictures; ShondaLand; Martin Chase Productions | —N/a |
| 2004 | Christmas with the Kranks | Joe Roth | Columbia Pictures; Revolution Studios; 1492 Pictures | —N/a |
| 2005 | The Pacifier | Adam Shankman | Walt Disney Pictures; Spyglass Entertainment | —N/a |
| 2005 | Sin City | Robert Rodriguez | Miramax Films; Dimension Films; Troublemaker Studios | Composed with Robert Rodriguez & Graeme Revell |
| 2005 | The Adventures of Sharkboy and Lavagirl in 3-D | Robert Rodriguez | Miramax Films; Dimension Films; Columbia Pictures; Troublemaker Studios | Composed with Robert Rodriguez & Graeme Revell |
| 2005 | Duma | Carroll Ballard | Warner Bros. Pictures; Gaylord Films; John Wells Productions | Composed with George Acogny |
| 2005 | Deuce Bigalow: European Gigolo | Mike Bigelow | Columbia Pictures; Happy Madison Productions; Out of the Blue... Entertainment | Theme music only Score composed by James L. Venable |
| 2005 | Dreamer | John Gatins | DreamWorks Pictures; Tollin/Robbins Productions; Hyde Park Entertainment | —N/a |
| 2005 | Venom | Jim Gillespie | Miramax Films; Dimension Films; Outerbanks Entertainment; Collision Entertainment | Theme music only Score composed by James L. Venable |
| 2005 | Chicken Little | Mark Dindal | Walt Disney Pictures; Walt Disney Feature Animation | —N/a |
| 2005 | Zathura: A Space Adventure | Jon Favreau | Columbia Pictures; Radar Pictures; Teitler Film; Michael De Luca Productions | —N/a |
| 2005 | Cheaper by the Dozen 2 | Adam Shankman | 20th Century Fox; 21 Laps Entertainment | —N/a |
| 2006 | Keeping Up with the Steins | Scott Marshall | Miramax Films | —N/a |
| 2006 | The Ant Bully | John A. Davis | Warner Bros. Pictures; Legendary Pictures; Playtone; DNA Productions | Nominated- Annie Award for Music in a Feature Production; Nominated-IFMCA Award for Best Original Score for an Animated Film |
| 2006 | Barnyard | Steve Oedekerk | Paramount Pictures; Nickelodeon Movies; O Entertainment | —N/a |
| 2006 | Idlewild | Bryan Barber | Universal Pictures; Atlas Entertainment; Forensic Films; HBO Films; Mosaic Media Group | —N/a |
| 2006 | Everyone's Hero | Colin Brady; Dan St. Pierre; Christopher Reeve | 20th Century Fox; IDT Entertainment | —N/a |
| 2007 | Spider-Man 3 | Sam Raimi | Columbia Pictures; Marvel Entertainment; Laura Ziskin Productions | Additional music Score composed by Christopher Young |
| 2007 | Georgia Rule | Garry Marshall | Universal Pictures; Morgan Creek Productions | —N/a |
| 2007 | Evan Almighty | Tom Shadyac | Universal Pictures; Spyglass Entertainment; Relativity Media; Shady Acres Entertainment; Original Film | Nominated- IFMCA Award for Best Original Score for a Comedy Film |
| 2007 | Big Stan | Rob Schneider | Sony Pictures Home Entertainment; Crystal Sky Pictures; Silver Nitrate; From Out of Nowhere Productions | Theme music only Score composed by John Hunter |
| 2008 | Meet Dave | Brian Robbins | 20th Century Fox; Dune Entertainment; Regency Enterprises; Guy Walks Into a Bar Productions; Friendly Films | —N/a |
| 2008 | The Mummy: Tomb of the Dragon Emperor | Rob Cohen | Universal Pictures; Relativity Media; The Sommers Company; Alphaville Films | Additional music Score composed by Randy Edelman |
| 2008 | Swing Vote | Joshua Michael Stern | Touchstone Pictures; Treehouse Films; 1821 Pictures; Radar Pictures | —N/a |
| 2008 | The Stoning of Soraya M. | Cyrus Nowrasteh | Roadside Attractions; Mpower Pictures | —N/a |
| 2008 | My Best Friend's Girl | Howard Deutch | Lionsgate Films; Terra Firma Films; Management 360; Superfinger Entertainment | —N/a |
| 2009 | Hotel for Dogs | Thor Freudenthal | Paramount Pictures; DreamWorks Pictures; Nickelodeon Movies; Cold Spring Pictures; The Donners' Company; The Montecito Picture Company | —N/a |
| 2009 | Hannah Montana: The Movie | Peter Chelsom | Walt Disney Pictures; It's a Laugh Productions; Millar/Gough Ink | —N/a |
| 2009 | Aliens in the Attic | John Schultz | 20th Century Fox; Regency Enterprises; Josephson Entertainment; Dune Entertainment | —N/a |
| 2009 | Old Dogs | Walt Becker | Walt Disney Pictures; Tapestry Films | —N/a |

==== 2010s ====
| Year | Title | Director(s) | Studio(s) | Notes |
|---|---|---|---|---|
| 2010 | Valentine's Day | Garry Marshall | Warner Bros. Pictures; New Line Cinema; Wayne Rice Films; Karz Entertainment | —N/a |
| 2010 | Snowmen | Robert Kirbyson | Arc Entertainment; Heritage Films; Mpower Pictures | —N/a |
| 2010 | Iron Man 2 | Jon Favreau | Paramount Pictures; Marvel Studios | —N/a |
| 2010 | Predators | Nimród Antal | 20th Century Fox; Troublemaker Studios; Davis Entertainment; Dune Entertainment; Ingenious Media | Themes by Alan Silvestri |
| 2010 | Yogi Bear | Eric Brevig | Warner Bros. Pictures; De Line Pictures; Sunswept Entertainment | Replaced Andrew Lockington |
| 2011 | No Strings Attached | Ivan Reitman | Paramount Pictures; DreamWorks Pictures; Spyglass Entertainment; Cold Spring Pictures; The Montecito Picture Company; Katalyst Films; Handsomecharlie Films | —N/a |
| 2011 | The Change-Up | David Dobkin | Universal Pictures; Original Film; Relativity Media; Big Kid Pictures | Composed with Theodore Shapiro |
| 2011 | Dream House | Jim Sheridan | Universal Pictures (North America); Warner Bros. Pictures (International); Morgan Creek Productions | —N/a |
| 2011 | The Double | Michael Brandt | Image Entertainment; Hyde Park Entertainment; Imagenation Abu Dhabi | —N/a |
| 2011 | New Year's Eve | Garry Marshall | Warner Bros. Pictures; New Line Cinema; Wayne Rice Films; Karz Entertainment | —N/a |
| 2012 | A Thousand Words | Brian Robbins | Paramount Pictures; DreamWorks Pictures; Saturn Films; Varsity Pictures; Work After Midnight Films | —N/a |
| 2012 | The Three Stooges | Farrelly brothers | 20th Century Fox; C3 Entertainment; Charles B. Wessler Entertainment; Dune Entertainment; Conundrum Entertainment | —N/a |
| 2012 | Alex Cross | Rob Cohen | Lionsgate Films; QED International; Block/Hanson; Emmett/Furla Films; Envision Entertainment Corporation; IAC Productions; James Patterson Entertainment; Summit Entertainment | —N/a |
| 2013 | The Call | Brad Anderson | TriStar Pictures; Stage 6 Films; Troika Pictures; WWE Studios; Amasia Entertainment; Apotheosis Media Group | —N/a |
| 2013 | Jobs | Joshua Michael Stern | Open Road Films; Five Star Feature Films; IF Entertainment; Venture Forth; Silver Reel; Endgame Entertainment | —N/a |
| 2014 | Draft Day | Ivan Reitman | Lionsgate Films; Summit Entertainment; OddLot Entertainment; The Montecito Picture Company | —N/a |
| 2014 | Walk of Shame | Steven Brill | Focus World; Sidney Kimmel Entertainment; Brownstone Productions; Lakeshore Entertainment | —N/a |
| 2014 | The Road Within | Gren Wells | Well Go USA Entertainment | Theme music only Score composed by The Newton Brothers & Josh Debney |
| 2014 | The Cobbler | Tom McCarthy | Image Entertainment; Golden Spike; Next Wednesday; Voltage Pictures | —N/a |
| 2014 | Stonehearst Asylum | Brad Anderson | Millennium Films; Icon Productions; Sobini Films | —N/a |
| 2015 | The SpongeBob Movie: Sponge Out of Water | Paul Tibbitt | Paramount Pictures; Paramount Animation; Nickelodeon Movies; United Plankton Pictures | —N/a |
| 2015 | Careful What You Wish For | Elizabeth Allen Rosenbaum | Starz Digital; Troika Pictures; Hyde Park Entertainment; Amasia Entertainment; Roberi Media; Image Nation; Merced Media Partners; Myriad Pictures; Ashok Amritraj Productions | Theme music only Score composed by The Newton Brothers & Josh Debney |
| 2015 | Broken Horses | Vidhu Vinod Chopra | Reliance Entertainment; Vinod Chopra Films | —N/a |
| 2016 | The Young Messiah | Cyrus Nowrasteh | Focus Features; 1492 Pictures; CJ Entertainment; Hyde Park International; Ocean Blue Entertainment | —N/a |
| 2016 | The Jungle Book | Jon Favreau | Walt Disney Pictures; Fairview Entertainment | Hollywood Music in Media Award for Best Original Score in a Sci-Fi/Fantasy/Horror Film; Nominated- Satellite Award for Best Original Score; Nominated- IFMCA Award for Best Original Score for Action/Adventure Film |
| 2016 | Mother's Day | Garry Marshall | Open Road Films; Capacity Pictures; Gulfstream Pictures; PalmStar Media | —N/a |
| 2016 | Ice Age: Collision Course | Mike Thurmeier | 20th Century Fox; 20th Century Fox Animation; Blue Sky Studios | Replaced John Powell |
| 2016 | League of Gods | Koan Hui; Vernie Yeung | China Star Entertainment Group; Bona Film Group | —N/a |
| 2017 | Home Again | Hallie Meyers-Shyer | Open Road Films; Black Bicycle Entertainment; Waverly Films | —N/a |
| 2017 | The Greatest Showman | Michael Gracey | 20th Century Fox; Laurence Mark Productions; Chernin Entertainment | Composed with Joseph Trapanese; Nominated-Saturn Award for Best Music |
| 2018 | Beirut | Brad Anderson | Bleecker Street; Radar Pictures; ShivHans Pictures | —N/a |
| 2018 | Brian Banks | Tom Shadyac | Bleecker Street; ShivHans Pictures; Gidden Media | —N/a |
| 2019 | Isn't It Romantic | Todd Strauss-Schulson | Warner Bros. Pictures (United States, Canada and Argentina); Netflix (International); New Line Cinema; Bron Creative; Camp Sugar; Little Engine; Broken Road Productions | —N/a |
| 2019 | The Beach Bum | Harmony Korine | Neon; Iconoclast; Anonymous Content; Le Grisbi Productions; SPK Pictures; Vice Films; Riverstone Pictures; Rocket Science | —N/a |
| 2019 | Dora and the Lost City of Gold | James Bobin | Paramount Pictures; Paramount Players; Nickelodeon Movies; Walden Media; MRC; Burr! Productions | Composed with Germaine Franco |
| 2019 | Sextuplets | Michael Tiddes | Netflix; Ugly Baby Productions; Wayans Alvarez Productions | —N/a |
| 2019 | Lake of Death | Nini Bull Robsahm | Gussi Films (Mexico); SF Studios (Norway); Canopy Film | —N/a |

==== 2020s ====
| Year | Title | Director(s) | Studio(s) | Notes |
|---|---|---|---|---|
| 2020 | Come Away | Brenda Chapman | Signature Entertainment (United Kingdom); Relativity Media (United States); Endurance Media; Fred Films; Yoruba Saxon Productions | —N/a |
| 2020 | I Still Believe | Erwin Brothers | Lionsgate; Kingdom Story Company; Kevin Downes Productions; Erwin Brothers Entertainment | —N/a |
| 2020 | Asteroid Hunters | W.D. Hogan | Imax Filmed Entertainment (Worldwide); Shaw Organisation (Singapore); Day's End Pictures | Documentary film |
| 2020 | Jingle Jangle: A Christmas Journey | David E. Talbert | Netflix; Golden Girl; Brillstein Entertainment Partners; Burr Productions; Get Lifted Film Company; 260 Degrees Entertainment | Nominated-Black Reel Award for Outstanding Original Score |
| 2021 | Clifford the Big Red Dog | Walt Becker | Paramount Pictures (Worldwide); Entertainment One (Canada and United Kingdom); New Republic Pictures; The Kerner Company; Scholastic Entertainment | —N/a |
| 2021 | Home Sweet Home Alone | Dan Mazer | Disney+ 20th Century Studios; Hutch Parker Entertainment | Original Home Alone themes by John Williams |
| 2021 | American Underdog | Erwin Brothers | Lionsgate Films; Kingdom Story Company; Erwin Brothers Entertainment; City on a Hill Productions | —N/a |
| 2022 | Marry Me | Kat Coiro | Universal Pictures; Nuyorican Productions; Perfect World Pictures; Kung Fu Monkey Productions | —N/a |
| 2022 | Luck | Peggy Holmes | Apple TV+ Apple Studios; Skydance Animation | Nominated-Best Original Score in an Animated Film |
| 2022 | Hocus Pocus 2 | Anne Fletcher | Disney+ Walt Disney Pictures; David Kirschner Productions; Weimaraner Republic Pictures | —N/a |
| 2023 | 80 for Brady | Kyle Marvin | Paramount Pictures; 199 Productions; Fifth Season; Watch This Ready | —N/a |
| 2023 | Spy Kids: Armageddon | Robert Rodriguez | Netflix; Skydance Media; Spyglass Media Group; Double R Productions | Composed with Rebel Rodriguez and Robert Rodriguez |
| 2023 | Under the Boardwalk | David Soren | Paramount Pictures; Paramount Animation; Big Kid Pictures | Composed with Jonathan Sadoff |
| 2024 | The Garfield Movie | Mark Dindal | Columbia Pictures; Alcon Entertainment; DNEG Animation; One Cool Group Limited; Wayfarer Studios; Stage 6 Films; Andrews McMeel Entertainment | —N/a |
| 2024 | Horizon: An American Saga – Chapter 1 | Kevin Costner | Warner Bros. Pictures; New Line Cinema; Territory Pictures | —N/a |
| 2024 | Space Cadet | Liz W. Garcia | Amazon MGM Studios; Stampede Ventures | —N/a |
| 2024 | Horizon: An American Saga – Chapter 2 | Kevin Costner | Warner Bros. Pictures; New Line Cinema; Territory Pictures | —N/a |
| 2025 | In Your Dreams | Alex Woo | Netflix; Netflix Animation Studios; Sony Pictures Imageworks; Kuku Studios | —N/a |
| 2025 | The SpongeBob Movie: Search for SquarePants | Derek Drymon | Paramount Pictures; Paramount Animation; Nickelodeon Movies | —N/a |
| 2026 | You, Me & Tuscany | Kat Coiro | Universal Pictures; Will Packer Productions | —N/a |
| 2026 | The Man with the Bag | Adam Shankman | Amazon MGM Studios; Metro-Goldwyn-Mayer; Grey Matter Productions | |
| 2026 | Zero A. D.: The Birth of Christ | Alejandro Monteverde | Angel Studios; Kasbah Films; 2521 Entertainment; Metanoia Films | |

=== Television ===
| Years | Title | Notes |
|---|---|---|
| 1982 | Walt Disney's Wonderful World of Color | 2 episodes |
| 1984 | Dragon's Lair | 13 episodes |
| 1984–1985 | Disney Family Album | 5 episodes |
| 1985–1987 | Fame | 30 episodes |
| 1986 | The Twilight Zone | Episode: "The Storyteller/Nightsong" |
| 1986 | Cagney & Lacey | Episode: "The Marathon" |
| 1987 | Sport Goofy in Soccermania | Special |
| 1987 | CBS Summer Playhouse | Episode: "Changing Patterns" |
| 1987 | ABC Afterschool Special | Episode: "The Day My Kid Went Punk" |
| 1988–1991 | A Pup Named Scooby-Doo | 27 episodes |
| 1988 | Police Academy | 14 episodes |
| 1989 | The Further Adventures of SuperTed | 13 episodes |
| 1989 | Trenchcoat in Paradise | Television film |
| 1989 | Nightmare Classics | Episode: "The Eyes of the Panther" |
| 1989–1990 | Dink, the Little Dinosaur | 5 episodes |
| 1989–1992 | The Young Riders | 6 episodes Primetime Emmy Award for Outstanding Music Composition for a Series; Nominated- Primetime Emmy Award for Outstanding Original Main Title Theme Music |
| 1990 | The Yum Yums: The Day Things Went Sour | Television film |
| 1990 | The Face of Fear | Television film |
| 1990 | Tiny Toon Adventures | 2 episodes: "Gang Busters" and "Hollywood Plucky" |
| 1990 | Piggsburg Pigs! | Episode: "Mummies From Outer Space" |
| 1991 | A Seduction in Travis County | Television film |
| 1991 | Vidiots | Television film |
| 1991 | Into the Badlands | Television film |
| 1992 | Do Not Bring That Python in the House | Television film |
| 1992 | Still Not Quite Human | Television film |
| 1992 | Sunstroke | Television film |
| 1992 | The Plucky Duck Show | Episode: "Hollywood Plucky" |
| 1993 | I Yabba-Dabba Do! | Television film |
| 1993 | Jonny's Golden Quest | Television film |
| 1993 | Class of '61 | Television film |
| 1993 | Star Trek: Deep Space Nine | 2 episodes: The Nagus, Progress |
| 1993 | Jack's Place | 3 episodes |
| 1993 | Praying Mantis | Television film |
| 1993 | For Love and Glory | Television film |
| 1993 | The Halloween Tree | Television film |
| 1993 | The Town Santa Forgot | Television film |
| 1993 | Hollyrock-a-Bye Baby | Television film |
| 1993–1994 | SeaQuest DSV | 19 episodes Primetime Emmy Award for Outstanding Original Main Title Theme Music |
| 1994 | Star Trek: The Next Generation | Episode: "The Pegasus" |
| 1995 | In Pursuit of Honor | Television film |
| 1995 | Kansas | Television film |
| 1996 | Doctor Who | Television film |
| 1996 | The Cape | Episode: "Pilot" Primetime Emmy Award for Outstanding Music Composition for a Series; Nominated- Primetime Emmy Award for Outstanding Original Main Title Theme Music |
| 1997 | Justice League of America | Television film |
| 2000 | Running Mates | Television film |
| 2000 | G-Saviour | Television film |
| 2012 | Hatfields & McCoys | Miniseries; Composed with Tony Morales Nominated- Primetime Emmy Award for Outstanding Music Composition for a Limited Series or Special |
| 2013 | Bonnie & Clyde | Miniseries |
| 2014 | The After | Television film |
| 2014 | Houdini | Miniseries |
| 2014–2015 | Forever | 22 episodes |
| 2015 | Point of Honor | Television film |
| 2015 | American Odyssey | 13 episodes |
| 2015 | Texas Rising | Miniseries; Composed with Bruce Broughton Nominated- Primetime Emmy Award for Outstanding Original Main Title Theme Music; Nominated- Hollywood Music in Media Award for Best Main Title Music in a TV Series; Nominated- IFMCA Award for Best Original Score for Television |
| 2016 | Game of Silence | 4 episodes |
| 2017 | Flint | Television film |
| 2017–2019 | Santa Clarita Diet | 10 episodes |
| 2017–2022 | The Orville | 19 episodes IFMCA Award for Best Original Score for Television |
| 2017–2024 | Young Sheldon | 3 episodes Composed with Jeff Cardoni |
| 2021–2022 | The Mighty Ducks: Game Changers | 20 episodes |
| 2026 | The Gray House | Miniseries; Composed with Bruce Broughton |
| 2027 | Oswald | Miniseries; 3 episodes |

=== Video games ===
| Year | Title | Notes |
|---|---|---|
| 2007 | Lair | —N/a |
| 2011 | The Sims Medieval | —N/a |
| 2018 | Madden NFL 19 | —N/a |

== Awards and nominations ==
| Year | Award | Result |
|---|---|---|
| 2023 | Emmy Award – Outstanding Music Composition for a Limited or Anthology Series, Movie or Special (Original Dramatic Score): Hocus Pocus 2 (2023) | Nominated |
| 2015 | Emmy Award – Outstanding Original Main Title Theme Music: Texas Rising (with Bruce Broughton) (2015) | Nominated |
| 2012 | Emmy Award – Outstanding Music Composition for a Miniseries, Movie, or Special (Original Dramatic Score): Hatfields & McCoys: Part 1 (with Tony Morales) (2012) | Nominated |
| 2008 | Interactive Achievement Award - Outstanding Achievement in Original Music Composition: Lair (with Kevin Kaska) (2007) | Nominated |
| 2005 | Academy Award – Best Original Score: The Passion of the Christ (2004) | Nominated |
| 1997 | Emmy Award – Outstanding Original Main Title Theme Music: The Cape (1996) | Nominated |
| 1997 | Emmy Award – Outstanding Music Composition for a Series (Dramatic Underscore): The Cape: Pilot (with Louis Febre) (1996) | Won |
| 1994 | Emmy Award – Outstanding Original Main Title Theme Music: SeaQuest DSV (1993) | Won |
| 1991 | Emmy Award – Outstanding Music Composition for a Series (Dramatic Underscore): The Young Riders: Kansas (1989) | Won |
| 1990 | Emmy Award – Outstanding Original Main Title Theme Music: The Young Riders (1989) | Nominated |
