= Shady Acres Entertainment =

US film and television production company

- Type: Production company
- Industry: Film and television production
- Founded: 1999; 27 years ago
- Founder: Tom Shadyac
- Headquarters: 10 Universal City Plaza, Universal City, California, United States
- Products: Films, television series

Shady Acres Entertainment is an American film and television production company founded in 1999 by producer and director Tom Shadyac. It is based at Universal Studios. It is taken from his last name, Shadyac, which is separated and became the two words "Shady" and "Acres". It also derives from a fictional mental hospital from the first Ace Ventura film. Shady Acres signed a production deal with Universal Pictures to produce films, while its lone television series was co-produced by Touchstone Television (now ABC Signature).

On June 4, 1999, Shady Acres received a television shingle, which would be based at Touchstone Television (now ABC Signature). Although the company produced a handful of pilots, only one of them would go on the air.

On February 14, 2008, Universal decided to cut ties with the studio, and became an independent production outfit.

Nicole Pritchett was the head of development and production at Shady Acres Entertainment from 2009 until 2015, along with one of the producers of the documentary I Am.

== Filmography ==
=== Films ===
Release date	Title	Director	Distributor	Budget	Gross (worldwide)	Notes	Ref.
February 22, 2002	Dragonfly	Tom Shadyac	Universal Pictures	$60 million	$52.3 million	co-production with Spyglass Entertainment and Gran Via Productions	
May 23, 2003	Bruce Almighty	Tom Shadyac	Universal Pictures	$81 million	$484.6 million	co-production with Spyglass Entertainment and Pit Bull Productions	
August 18, 2006	Accepted	Steve Pink	Universal Pictures	$23 million	$38.6 million	N/A	
June 22, 2007	Evan Almighty	Tom Shadyac	Universal Pictures	$175 million	$174.4 million	co-production with Spyglass Entertainment, Relativity Media and Original Film	
July 20, 2007	I Now Pronounce You Chuck & Larry	Dennis Dugan	Universal Pictures	$85 million	$187 million	co-production with Relativity Media and Happy Madison Productions	
October 2010	I Am	Tom Shadyac	Flying Eye Productions (North America); Universal Pictures (International)	N/A	N/A	co-production with Homemade Canvas Productions	
April 9, 2011	Happy	Roko Belic	N/A	N/A	N/A	co-production with Wadi Rum Productions	

=== Television series ===
Year	Title	Network	Notes	Ref.
2002-05	8 Simple Rules	ABC	co-production with Flody Co., Tracy Gamble Productions and Touchstone Television	
