= Roko Belic =

American film producer and director

Roko Belić
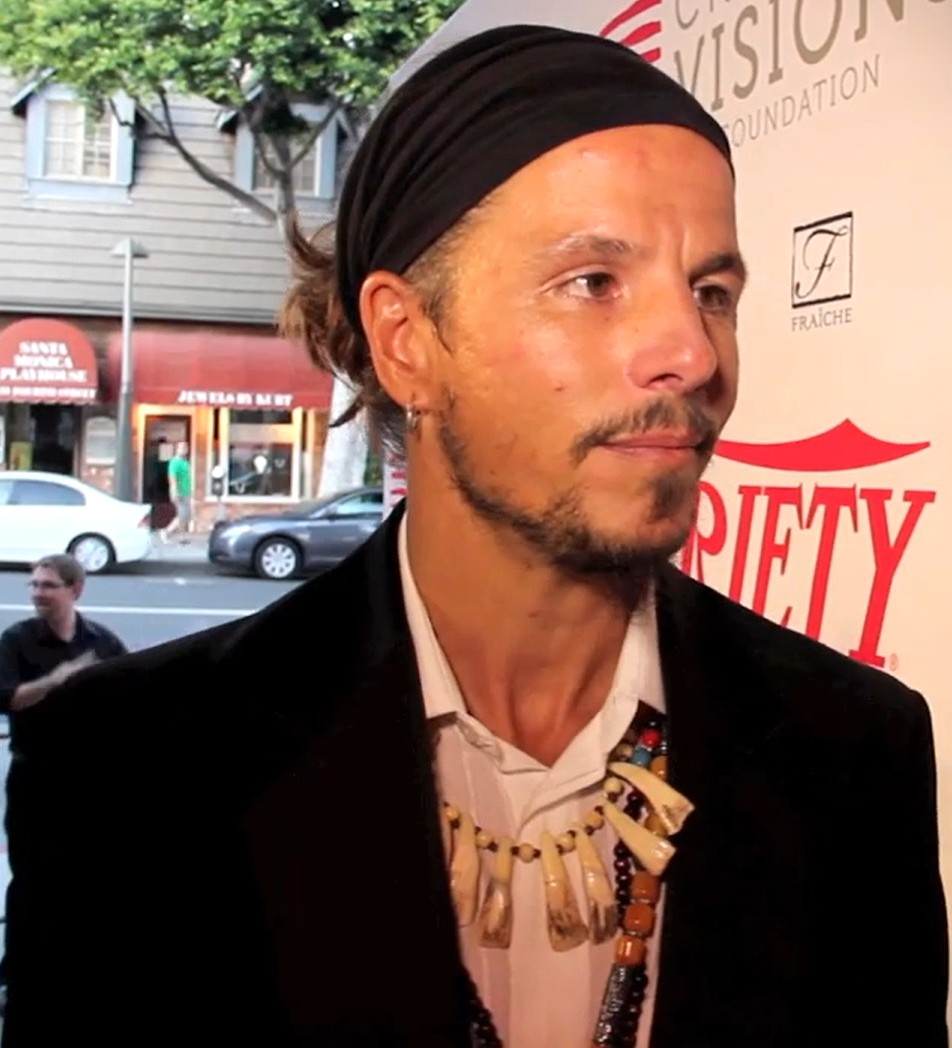
- Belic in 2012
- Education: University of California, Santa Barbara
- Occupations: Film producer and director
- Years active: 1993–present
- Notable work: Genghis Blues, Happy
- Style: Documentary film
- Partner: Gael Firth
- Children: 2

Roko Belic is an American film producer and director. His directorial debut, Genghis Blues, was nominated for an Academy Award for Best Documentary Feature.

== Early life and education ==
Belic was born to Czechoslovak and Yugoslav parents, Danica and Dr. Nenad Belic. During his childhood, his mother used a wrench to lock a broken dial on the family TV to the local PBS channel. His first film-making experience was in third grade with his brother, Adrian, when childhood friend Christopher Nolan borrowed a Super 8 movie camera from his parents. With Nolan, Belic co–directed the surreal Super 8 film Tarantella (1989), which aired on Image Union, an independent film and video showcase on the Public Broadcasting Service. Nolan and Roko also worked together on a documenting a safari across four African countries, organized by the late photojournalist Dan Eldon in the early 1990s.

Belic grew up in suburban Chicago, attended Evanston Township High School and later attended the University of California, Santa Barbara. In April 1994, while a student at the university, Belic organized a gathering of 150 students who engaged with each other while nude. The gathering was titled "X-Hibition."

== Career ==
For his first feature, Belic was inspired by a story in the little-known Siberian republic of Tuva. Trusting his intuition, Belic purchased two cameras on credit and flew with his brother to Tuva to create the documentary feature, Genghis Blues (1999). Belic’s landmark film received an Academy Award nomination for best documentary feature and won over 70 international film festival awards including the Sundance Audience Award.

Belic associate produced Beyond the Call (2006), which followed three American soldiers-turned-humanitarians traveling to war zones around the world to deliver aid. The following year, Belic co-produced and shot Indestructible (2007), which was filmed in locations from China to Israel and followed one man's search for a cure for his terminal illness.

In 2010, Belic directed the documentary Dreams: Cinema of the Subconscious, included on the Inception (2010) Blu-ray. Following its success, he directed The Batmobile, released on The Dark Knight Rises (2012) Blu-ray.

Belic teamed up with director Tom Shadyac (Bruce Almighty, Liar Liar, The Nutty Professor), who executive produced, to make the feature documentary Happy (2012). He directed the music video for the Grammy-winning song Caravan by Opium Moon and he most recently directed Trust Me (2020).

== Personal life ==
Belic has a daughter and son with longtime girlfriend, Gael Firth. His father, Nenad, was a retired cardiologist who died while attempting to row solo across the Atlantic Ocean.

== Filmography ==
=== Director ===
- Tarantella (1989)
- Genghis Blues (1999)
- Happy (2011)
- Dreams (2010)
- The Batmobile (2012)
- Caravan (2018)
- Paradise (2019)
- Trust Me (2020)

=== Producer ===
- Genghis Blues (1999) (executive producer) (producer)
- Homecoming (2004) (field producer)
- Beyond the Call (2006) (co-producer)
- Indestructible (2007) (co-producer)
- Happy (2011) (producer)
- Paradise (2019)
- Trust Me (2020)

=== Writer ===
- Genghis Blues (1999)
- Happy (2011)
- Dreams (2010)
- The Batmobile (2012)
- Paradise (2019)
- Trust Me (2020)

=== Cinematographer ===
- Genghis Blues (1999)
- Indestructible (2007)
- I Am (2010)
- Happy (2011)

=== Actor ===
- Totally Fucked Up (1993)
- Fame Whore (1997)
