= Brother's Keeper (1998 TV series) =

- Opening title sequence screenshot
- Genre: Sitcom
- Created by: Donald Todd
- Starring: William Ragsdale; Sean O'Bryan; Justin Cooper; Bess Meyer
- Composer: Jonathan Wolff
- Country of origin: United States
- Original language: English
- No. of seasons: 1
- No. of episodes: 23

Production
- Executive producers: Donald Todd; Jonathan Axelrod; James Widdoes
- Producer: Mark Grossan
- Production location: San Francisco, California (setting)
- Camera setup: Film; Multi-camera
- Running time: 22 minutes (approx.)
- Production companies: Axelrod/Widdoes Entertainment; Donald Todd Productions; Studios USA Television

Original release
- Network: ABC
- Release: September 25, 1998 – May 14, 1999

Brother's Keeper is an American television sitcom that ran for one season on ABC from September 25, 1998, to May 14, 1999. Created by Donald Todd, the series chronicles the rocky coexistence of Porter Waide (William Ragsdale) and his irresponsible pro-football player brother Bobby Waide (Sean O'Bryan), who is contractually forced to move into his brother's house, where Bobby's lifestyle often clashes with that of Porter's, and becomes an unwitting second parent to Porter's son Oscar (Justin Cooper).

== Premise ==
The series centers around Porter Waide (Ragsdale), a milquetoast college history professor and widowed single father, raising his son, Oscar (Cooper), by himself until his brother, Bobby (O'Bryan), a football placekicker who had just been signed to play with the San Francisco 49ers and has a reputation for being a bad boy, moves in with his brother and nephew, as part of a stipulation in his new multimillion-dollar contract in which Bobby has to live with someone who is more responsible than him, in order to change his troublemaking ways.

This situation proves incredibly challenging as Bobby continues to exhibit childish behavior in his adult years, which often aggravates Porter, as well as Bobby's smart, sarcastic and harried sports agent Dena Draeger (Bess Meyer), who has the unenviable task of "babysitting" Bobby to ensure he stays out of trouble and keep him from violating the terms of his new NFL contract. Although Porter is reluctant to let Bobby stay with him and his son, he realizes that Oscar is thrilled with the fact that he now gets to spend time with his famous uncle, with Bobby becoming an unlikely second parent to his nephew and making attempts to try to get his brother to have fun and loosen up, while Porter tries teaching Bobby how to be a responsible person.

Toward the end of the series, Porter wrestles with his burgeoning romantic feelings for Dena. Although it's implied that Dena partially reciprocates Porter's affection, the series is canceled before their relationship can advance.

== Cast ==
=== Main ===
- William Ragsdale – Porter Waide
- Sean O'Bryan – Bobby Waide
- Justin Cooper – Oscar Arthur Waide
- Bess Meyer – Dena Draeger

=== Recurring ===
- Natasha Slayton – Rose
- Kate Hodge – Marilyn

=== Special guests ===
- Elizabeth Berkley (as Amy; episode: "You Are Me")
- Dan Dierdorf (as himself; episode: "Kick Ball, Get Check")
- Illeana Douglas (as Ginny; episode: "Dating the Teacher")
- Boomer Esiason (as himself; episode: "Kick Ball, Get Check")
- John Michael Higgins (as Mark; episodes: "Trick or Treat?", "The Note", "Politically Impolite")
- Henry Kissinger (as himself; episode: "Politically Impolite")
- Jack Klugman (as Jack; episode: "An Odd Couple of Days")
- Piper Laurie (as Jane Waide; episode: "Everybody Says I Love You")
- Bill Maher (as himself; episode: "Politically Impolite")
- Karl Malone (as himself; episode: "You're in Trouble")
- Al Michaels (as himself; episode: "Kick Ball, Get Check")
- Heather Nauert (as herself; episode: "Politically Impolite")
- Tony Randall (as Tony; episode: "An Odd Couple of Days")
- Bobby Slayton (as himself; episode: "Politically Impolite")

== Episodes ==
| No. | Title | Directed by | Written by | Original release date | Prod. code | Viewers (millions) |
|---|---|---|---|---|---|---|
| 1 | "Pilot" | James Widdoes | Donald Todd | September 25, 1998 | 83606 | 11.95 |
One morning while getting his son Oscar (Justin Cooper) ready for school, college professor Porter Waide (William Ragsdale) is blindsided by the unexpected arrival of his brother Bobby (Sean O'Bryan), a football kicker who had recently been signed to play for the San Francisco 49ers, and finds himself unprepared when he finds out that Bobby's new million-dollar contract requires him to move in with a person he knows to be responsible, and decides to move in with Porter. An immediate clash of lifestyles ends up with Porter getting sent to the hospital after he gets a marble lodged in his nose, which leads Bobby to encourage his brother to ask out the beautiful nurse who removed the marble. Porter ends up with a black eye after he inadvertently gets into a barroom brawl while tracking down Bobby; the situation causes Porter to loosen up to where he asks the nurse out after a second trip to the hospital, and decides to play hooky and go to the zoo with Oscar the next day. Meanwhile during Bobby and Porter's crazy evening, Bobby's agent Dena (Bess Meyer) becomes an unwilling babysitter to Oscar.
| 2 | "Who's Your Daddy?" | James Widdoes | Matt Ember | October 2, 1998 | E0404 | 11.80 |
After taking Bobby's advice to make his classmates laugh in order to be liked by them, Oscar winds up in the vice principal's office. Porter and Bobby end up the ones that are punished when the vice principal sees that Oscar is being brought up by two people with differing personalities, and sends them to a parenting class. Porter decides to teach Bobby a lesson by letting him on take the responsibility of being "Oscar's dad" for a few days.
| 3 | "Since You Came Here" | James Widdoes | Donald Todd | October 9, 1998 | E0401 | 11.34 |
Porter becomes worried about Bobby's influence when Oscar decides he wants to be a bus driver when he grows up, instead of attending college. Since Oscar has been spending a lot of time with Bobby, Porter has been left with a lot of time on his hands. Bobby suggests he get a hobby and Oscar tries his hand at falconry, which creates havoc around the house when the falcon gets loose.
| 4 | "Sneaking Into the Movies" | James Widdoes | Neal Boushell & Sam O'Neal | October 16, 1998 | E0405 | 11.04 |
After Oscar and Rose get permission to go to the movies by themselves, Rose persuades Oscar to sneak into another film without a ticket. When Oscar confesses under pressure, Porter decides to teach his son a lesson by returning Oscar to the scene of the crime, where the manager decides to call the police and have him arrested and charged. Heeding advice from Dena, Porter visits the district attorney to plea bargain, and is appalled when Bobby attempts to bribe the D.A., who agrees to drop the charges simply because he is a fan of Bobby. Porter is left to think about the importance of honesty in an empty room, while Bobby, Oscar and the D.A. go off to sneak into a movie, but his tirade gets recycled by Bobby during a speaking engagement he refused to prepare for.
| 5 | "Cleaning Lessons" | James Widdoes | Tom J. Astle | October 23, 1998 | E0403 | 11.16 |
After Porter berates Bobby for not cleaning up after himself and leaving a huge mess around the house, instead of taking Porter's words to heart and cleaning up the house, Bobby decides to hire a maid named Katya to do the housework. Porter eventually winds up deciding to do all the work, when he doesn't feel that she is doing a proper enough job, while the maid sits around watching soap operas and eating sorbet.
| 6 | "Trick or Treat?" | James Widdoes | Matt Ember | October 30, 1998 | E0409 | 12.21 |
Bobby's Halloween costume frightens Oscar more than he will admit to, ruining his favorite holiday of the year. This angers Porter after he reflects on the sadistic pranks that Bobby used to play on him when they were kids, but when Bobby tries to comfort Oscar after a bad nightmare, everyone finds themselves trapped in a series of nightmare as each person in turn wakes out of the previous person's dream. Ultimately, Porter takes Oscar to see his friend Mark, who is a psychologist; unfortunately when they visit Mark, he happens to be costumed as Death, he explains that people sometimes deal with their own fears by dressing up as the fears that they can handle.
| 7 | "Kick Ball, Get Check" | James Widdoes | Billiam Coronel | November 6, 1998 | E0407 | 12.87 |
Bobby ends up himself in a football-kicking slump after promising to make a field goal for Oscar during a televised Monday Night Football game. Not even a pep talk from Porter is enough to get Bobby out of his losing streak, so he must discover a way to get his focus back on the game before he gets himself cut from the team.
| 8 | "You're in Trouble" | Ken Levine | Matt Ember | November 13, 1998 | E0412 | 11.69 |
Bobby tries to avoid having to take a mandatory drug test the members of the football team have to take, because of his anxiousness over having someone watching him urinate. Bobby, who has never taken drugs in his life, receives his test results and finds out that he failed, leaving Oscar doubting the credibility of his uncle. Bobby is determined to clear his good name with Porter and Dena's help, but their solution leads Oscar to question Bobby's morals even further especially when Dena gives Bobby the opportunity to cheat on his second drug test. They find out that the false positive was the result of Bobby having eaten bird seed belonging to Rose's pet bird (which contains poppy seeds).
| 9 | "The Boss of Me" | James Widdoes | Tom J. Astle | November 20, 1998 | E0410 | 10.30 |
Bobby becomes frustrated when Porter rejects Bobby's addition of a poster of an attractive woman to the kitchen decor, refuses to allow him to throw a birthday party for Oscar, and rejects the lavish gifts Bobby brings home for his nephew (including a huge dog and a big screen TV); this leads Bobby to demand an equal hand in making decisions and begins by deciding to buy a much bigger house. Challenged by Bobby's assertion that his brother has always been afraid of change, Porter reluctantly agrees to the move but has second thoughts when he realizes how much of his life is tied up in the house he and his late wife shared their lives together in. The Waide brothers compromise, and Oscar enjoys a lavish party (replete with a pony), while Bobby brings home a huge boat that he purchased and Porter finally keeps his promise to call the attractive nurse he met weeks earlier.
| 10 | "The Note" | James Widdoes | Kate Nielsen | December 4, 1998 | E0413 | 10.41 |
Bobby mocks Porter for putting encouraging notes in Oscar's school lunches much in the same way that their mother did with him, leading Porter to realize that his parents treated their sons differently and had vastly different expectations of them. Meanwhile, pushed beyond the limit by Bobby's childish teasing, Dena quits her job as Bobby's agent and is replaced by a driver whose total lack of a sense of humor makes Bobby realize just what he has lost.
| 11 | "Pillow Talk" | Joyce Gittlin | Mark Driscoll | December 11, 1998 | E0408 | 11.68 |
Porter becomes depressed after he literally bores the students in Oscar's class to sleep (and even manages to cause the teacher to lose attention), while giving a talk on Abraham Lincoln, leaving him questioning that perhaps he is not as good a teacher as he had always assumed. When Bobby and Oscar discover that Porter has the same effect on the students in the college Porter regularly teaches, Bobby tries to convince his brother (who realizes that he has no other skills besides teaching) to liven things up by convincing him that being "smart and interesting are two different things." Meanwhile, Dena becomes outraged when Porter's new teaching assistant happens to be a beautiful blonde woman and accuses him of academic sexism, then decides to become a blonde herself.
| 12 | "The Date" | Robby Benson | Kate Nielsen | January 8, 1999 | E0406 | 12.39 |
After scaring off his blind date Gretchen with his pre-date jitters, Porter is discouraged about ever going out on a date again until Bobby, Oscar and Rose try to convince him to ask Rose's mother Marilyn on a date. The two eventually decide to give it a try, but Porter accidentally offends Marilyn by coming off like "a pompous jerk" about the difference in their backgrounds. A second attempt gets off on better footing until Rose warns Porter not to leave Marilyn like all the other men in her life have done, and Porter becomes obsessed with the idea that he will surely destroy his friendship with Marilyn (and effectively, Rose's with Oscar). Meanwhile, Dena misinterprets Porter's remarks about falling for someone "who comes to my house every day" as his way of mentioning Porter has feelings for her.
| 13 | "You Are Me" | Dinah Manoff | Tom J. Astle | January 20, 1999 | E0416 | 10.70 |
Porter is proud of his trophy date, a gorgeous model named Amy (Elizabeth Berkley), who is attracted to sensitive intellectuals. Unfortunately, she considers herself a brain, though she proves herself to be anything but; Porter has a tough time convincing himself that his interest in Amy is based on shared ideas rather than mere physical attraction. Amy catches him off guard by enrolling in one of his classes, making it impossible for ethical Porter to date her; when he tells her about the complications of a college professor dating one of his students, Amy decides to hold off on any physical interaction until the end of the school year, further frustrating Porter. Meanwhile, a jealous Bobby makes a bet with Porter that he can make any woman fall for him -- even Dena.
| 14 | "Box of Stuff" | Dinah Manoff | Reid Harrison | January 22, 1999 | E0411 | 12.13 |
Porter and Bobby's mother sends the brother's a box of belongings from their childhood, reviving ancient rivalries over their collection of miniature sports cars (which a trip to a collectors' store reveals are quite valuable). The box also contains a sweater which belonged to Porter's first girlfriend, Laura Blair, and he decides to contact her to return it -- leaving Bobby agonizing over the fact that his brother never knew about the fact that Bobby had a one-night stand with Laura fourteen years earlier, and fears that it would devastate Porter if he discovers the truth. Porter eventually finds out during their trip to the collectibles store about Bobby's involvement with his first love after he discovers a photo of Bobby and Laura with a love note written by Laura on it. Their arguing over the matter disappoints Oscar, leading Porter to contact Laura to reunite with him and Bobby to rehash the incident; Bobby later admits that he was actually jealous that Porter was dating someone like Laura.
| 15 | "Game Ball" | Jason Bateman | Sam O'Neal & Neal Boushell | February 5, 1999 | E0414 | 11.03 |
While attempting to play football with his son Oscar and Oscar's friend Rose, Porter accidentally throws Bobby's prized "lucky" football from a conference championship game over the fence and into the path of a bus; Porter fails to understand Bobby's rage when his football is destroyed and kicks his brother out of the house. Dena is dismayed to come home to her apartment and find out that Bobby has moved into her place without her knowledge, since she's the only other responsible person that he can live with without jeopardizing his football contract; Dena takes refuge from Bobby by staying at Porter's house and sleeping on his couch, then persuades Oscar to sleep downstairs in Bobby's room while she sleeps in Oscar's bed. Porter, thinking that Oscar is the one sleeping in his bed, inadvertently gives Dena an affectionate kiss on the head in the dark. Dena decides to come up with a plan to reconcile the brothers by convincing them that one secretly hero-worships the other.
| 16 | "Dating the Teacher" | Dinah Manoff | Reid Harrison | February 12, 1999 | E0402 | 11.56 |
When Bobby volunteers to take Oscar to school, Bobby meets and asks out Oscar's teacher Ginny (Illeana Douglas), whom he brings home to his room at the end of the night. In order to stay out late with Ginny, Bobby plants false messages on the answering machine for Dena to hear when she calls to check if he has come home in time for his required curfew. When he discovers that his brother is dating his son's teacher and Oscar discovers that his teacher has spent the night at the house, a horrified Porter orders Bobby to put a stop to the relationship. Porter inadvertently asks Ginny out on a date, and the brothers begin to childishly fight over her, they later decide to call Ginny for her to choose which Waide brother she would most like to go out with.
| 17 | "An Odd Couple of Days" | James Widdoes | Donald Todd | February 19, 1999 | E0417 | 11.75 |
When Porter and Oscar's school breaks coincide with one another, Porter plans a road trip with his son for a little male bonding, but Bobby throws a wrench into the plan when he and Deena join in on the trip. When their RV breaks down and they go a garage to get it fixed, the brothers run into two feuding brothers-in-law (Jack Klugman and Tony Randall), who relationship reminds them of their own.
| 18 | "Everybody Says I Love You" | James Widdoes | Tom J. Astle | February 26, 1999 | E0420 | 10.02 |
Bobby has a difficult time telling his nephew Oscar that he loves him but he has no problem saying it to Porter because it doesn't mean anything when Bobby says it to his brother; Porter finds it difficult to utter the same words to Bobby. Attempting to discover the root of their problem, Porter decides to invite their cold-hearted, free-spirited mother (Piper Laurie) to try and resolve his and Bobby's problem with sharing their emotions, which leads to the uncovering of a few revelations they wish had been kept secret.
| 19 | "Security Farce" | Ken Levine | Tod Himmel & Lisa K. Nelson | March 19, 1999 | E0418 | 9.47 |
While chasing Oscar after a little ribbing from his nephew, Bobby injures his ankle, potentially jeopardizing his football career; after Bobby spends his time recuperating from his injury in a hot tub, Porter tries to get through to Bobby about what would happen to him if his football career ended. Deena wrangles Bobby a gig filling in as the host of a radio show on a local sports talk station; thing don't go well in the beginning when he hangs up on two callers questions about sports other than football and no one else calling in, he decides to act like a shock jock and boosts listenership by insulting listeners calling in. Bobby gets into an on-air argument with a irate caller who threatens to track Bobby down to meet him at Porter's house to settle the score (with Bobby even absent-mindedly giving out his brother's address on the air). To protect himself, his brother and nephew, Bobby decides to hire a burly bodyguard from the football team named Nick, who proves to be more trouble than a protector when he takes the job a little too seriously.
| 20 | "With Friends Like Porter" | James Widdoes | Lisa K. Nelson & Tod Himmel | April 9, 1999 | E0422 | 8.85 |
Porter comes home to find a nasty odor emanating from the chimney, which Bobby and Oscar oddly don't seem to notice at all; Porter decides to hire a contractor to take a look at it, but the man causes an even bigger mess when he hammers a hole above the mantle and then hires more crewmembers to work on the place. Porter becomes frustrated after realizing that he doesn't have any friends, Porter tries unsuccessfully to become buddies with the group of contractors. Bobby teaches his clueless brother how to be less of a snob and be one of the guys, but when Porter befriends one of the workers and takes him to a basketball game, disastrous results arise when the man dies of a heart attack after gorging on too much food.
| 21 | "Politically Impolite" | James Widdoes | Billiam Coronel | April 23, 1999 | E0415 | 7.31 |
Porter is invited to appear as a guest panelist on Politically Incorrect, and Deena wrangles Bobby a guest slot on the same show; Bobby ends up humiliating his brother by stealing Porter's notes in order to make himself look smart. Bobby ends up finding himself in a search for intelligence when he is invited to appear on Politically Incorrect a second time, alongside famed political scientist and diplomat Henry Kissinger, and Bobby tries to do anything it takes in order to not make himself look like an idiot.
| 22 | "The New Client" | James Widdoes | Neil J. Deiter | May 7, 1999 | E0419 | 7.90 |
Bobby becomes jealous over the attention Dena is giving to her new client, a race car driver named Gino; Porter decides to humor Oscar after he finds out about a high school prank that he pulled years ago in which he stole the head of his school's mascot costume by letting his son punish him. Meanwhile, Porter passes on an invitation from Dena to attend a charity benefit with her because he's been "grounded" by Oscar, an angry Dena storms out the house; but when Porter changes his mind and decides to muster up the courage to go tell Dena about his feelings for her, he crashes the party and is heartbroken when he finds her in the arms of another man. Note: Part 1 of 2.
| 23 | "The Duel" | James Widdoes | Donald Todd | May 14, 1999 | E0421 | 8.82 |
Porter schemes to win Dena's heart by trying to outwit her race car driver boyfriend Gino in a battle of intellectual conversation, but the plan backfires on the lovesick professor. Later, a small earthquake shakes up the usually unflappable Bobby, causing him to demand that he be traded from the San Francisco 49ers to another team in order to get away from the tremors. When the team owner and fans think that Bobby that it is a ploy to get more money in his contract, the public begins to turn against him. At the same time that Deena admits having romantic feelings for Porter, Bobby learns that the 49ers have cut him from the team. Note: Part 2 of 2.

== Production ==
Brother's Keeper was produced by Axelrod-Widdoes Entertainment and Donald Todd Productions in association with Studios USA Television. Show creator Donald Todd served as the executive producer and showrunner of the series, alongside non-writing executive producers Jonathan Axelrod and James Widdoes (the latter of whom had also directed fifteen of the series' 23 episodes, including the pilot episode and the final episode of the first season, that effectively became the show's series finale, "The Duel").

== Broadcast ==
The series aired as part of ABC's TGIF comedy lineup on Friday evenings; despite this, some of the show's episodes featured decidedly more adult humor than the rest of the TGIF lineup, which otherwise targeted pre-teens and teenagers (though like most family sitcoms aired on TGIF, Brother's Keeper incorporated humor that would appeal to both adult viewers as well as to the lineup's target audience); as such, the series was aired at 9:30 p.m. ET on Friday evenings and was one of two freshman series added to the block that season, along with the Mary-Kate and Ashley Olsen starring vehicle Two of a Kind (both series were joined by veteran TGIF shows Boy Meets World and Sabrina, the Teenage Witch).

== Reception ==
=== Ratings ===
Despite respectable ratings, often winning the 9:30 p.m. timeslot in most demographics and averaging 10.7 million total viewers during its run (finishing the 1998–99 season #62 out of 155 primetime shows, tied with the CBS newsmagazine 48 Hours, according to Nielsen Media Research), the series was cancelled by ABC in May 1999.

=== Awards ===
| Year | Award | Category | Recipient | Result |
|---|---|---|---|---|
| 1999 | Young Artist Award | Best Performance in a TV Comedy Series – Supporting Young Actor | Justin Cooper | Nominated |
| 1999 | Young Artist Award | Best Performance in a TV Comedy Series – Supporting Young Actor | Trevor Einhorn | Nominated |
| 1999 | Young Artist Award | Best Performance in a TV Comedy Series – Supporting Young Actress | Natasha Slayton | Nominated |
