= Dragonfly (2002 film) =

- Theatrical release poster
- Directed by: Tom Shadyac
- Screenplay by: Brandon Camp; Mike Thompson; David Seltzer
- Story by: Brandon Camp; Mike Thompson
- Produced by: Gary Barber; Roger Birnbaum; Mark Johnson; Tom Shadyac
- Starring: Kevin Costner; Joe Morton; Ron Rifkin; Linda Hunt; Kathy Bates
- Cinematography: Dean Semler
- Edited by: Don Zimmerman
- Music by: John Debney
- Production companies: Spyglass Entertainment; Shady Acres Entertainment
- Distributed by: Universal Pictures (North America); Spyglass Entertainment (International)
- Release date: February 22, 2002
- Running time: 104 minutes
- Countries: United States; Germany
- Language: English
- Budget: $60 million
- Box office: $52.3 million

Dragonfly is a 2002 supernatural drama thriller film directed by Tom Shadyac from a screenplay by Brandon Camp, Mike Thompson, and David Seltzer based on a story by Camp and Thompson. The film was produced by Gary Barber, Roger Birnbaum, Mark Johnson, and Shadyac. It stars Kevin Costner as Joe Darrow, a grieving doctor being contacted by his dead wife Emily through his patients' near-death experiences. Dragonfly was released by Universal Pictures on February 22, 2002 in North America and by Spyglass Entertainment in other territories. Upon release, Dragonfly was a critical and commercial failure, with the film only grossing $52.3 million against its $60 million production budget and was universally panned by critics, who described it as "sappy, dull and muddled" and "too melancholic and cliched".

== Plot ==
Joe and Emily Darrow are doctors in a Chicago hospital. Seven months pregnant Emily travels to Venezuela to help natives in the Amazon area. She dies when a bus is hit by a landslide and plunges into the river below. Her body is never found by the authorities.

Without taking time to grieve, Joe returns to work. One night, he is awakened when Emily's dragonfly paper weight falls and rolls across the room. Emily always had a passion for dragonflies and even had a birthmark on her shoulder which resembled a dragonfly. At the pediatric oncology unit, Joe starts visiting Emily's patients. One of them, a child named Jeffrey Reardon, is brought in unconscious. Joe hears Jeffrey calling his name. The staff try to revive him without success and his heart flatlines. Joe then approaches Jeffrey, whose heart begins beating again.

The following afternoon, Joe returns to Jeffrey who asks if he is "Emily's Joe" and says that she sent him back to tell Joe something. In the room there are drawings of a curvy cross, but Jeffrey does not know what it means. During his near death experience, Jeffrey saw a light, and a woman showing an image of Joe; the cross symbol was what he saw at the end of the rainbow. Later, while passing by Ben, another child's room, Joe sees the same drawing. Ben knows who Joe is and says that he must "go to the rainbow".

When Joe arrives at his home, his parrot goes into a rage, breaking a pot and making the symbol drawn in the spilled soil on the floor. Joe spots a dragonfly flying outside the window, and briefly sees Emily reaching for him. Joe's neighbor Miriam Belmont tries to talk him back into reality. Instead, he goes to Sister Madeline, a controversial nun who investigated near-death experiences. She thinks that Emily is indeed trying to contact Joe from the other side.

Later, at the hospital, Joe is alone with a clinically dead patient. Joe then hears Emily speaking through the patient, calling his name but no one believes him. He decides to sell his home and go on vacation. While packing away Emily's belongings, the lightbulb in the room burns out. When he returns with a new bulb, all the belongings he had packed away are back in their original places. He enters his kitchen where a map has blown open, showing the symbol at several places. He learns from his friend Hal that the cross is the map symbol for a waterfall. Joe remembers a photo of Emily posing in front of a waterfall with a rainbow behind her.

Joe takes a trip to the area where Emily died. Joe's pilot, Victor, takes him to the victims' graves near a tribe village. Joe shows the photo and asks his native guides if they know where Emily is buried. They start arguing with each other that he should be brought to the village. Joe's attention then shifts to the village and he runs off to it. He comes to a cliff and sees the bus down below in the water. Joe jumps into the river and enters the semi-flooded bus, causing it to shift and become completely submerged. Trapped inside, Joe sees a glow fill the bus and then Emily appears, reaching for his hand. The events of her final hours flash before him, showing she survived the accident and was pulled to safety by nearby Yanomami villagers. Joe is then rescued by Victor.

Joe runs to the village and is surrounded by native men with weapons. He holds up a photo of Emily. A native tells him they could not save Emily's body but they saved her soul. Perplexed, he follows the native woman into a hut and inside is a girl in a basket, the child Emily was carrying, who survived the accident. There is a birthmark on the child in the shape of a dragonfly. As he embraces his daughter, he realizes what Emily was trying to tell him. Some time later, Joe plays with his daughter, now a toddler with wavy blonde hair, the very image of Emily.

== Cast ==
- Kevin Costner as Dr. Joe Darrow
- Joe Morton as Hugh Campbell
- Ron Rifkin as Dr. Charlie Dickinson
- Kathy Bates as Miriam Belmont
- Linda Hunt as Sister Madeline
- Susanna Thompson as Dr. Emily Darrow
- Jacob Vargas as Victor
- Lisa Banes as Flora
- Matt Craven as Eric
- Jay Thomas as Hal
- Robert Bailey, Jr. as Jeffrey Reardon
- Jacob Smith as Ben
- Casey Biggs as Neil Darrow
- Leslie Hope as Charisse Darrow
- Peter Hansen as Phillip Darrow
- Liza Weil as Suicide Girl
- Heidi Swedberg as Surgical Nurse
- Samantha Smith as Waitress
- Andy Umberger as Doctor
- L. Scott Caldwell as Head Nurse
- Kent Faulcon as Paul Reardon
- Deirdre O'Connell as Gwyn
- Justina Machado as Oncology Nurse
- Maz Jobrani as Paramedic

== Production ==
The project was initially set up at Metro-Goldwyn-Mayer (MGM) when the script was bought for a mid six figures outbidding Touchstone. The script was put into turnaround when MGM grew uncertain of the $75 million budget with Shady Acres Entertainment reacquiring the domestic distribution rights that in turn were acquired by Universal, while Spyglass Entertainment handled foreign pre-sales in a manner similar to the arrangement with The Sixth Sense whose success helped give Dragonfly the traction it needed to move into production. Kevin Costner entered negotiations to star in September 2000.

== Release ==
Produced on a $60 million budget, Dragonfly made $52.3 million worldwide, making it a box-office bomb.

== Home media ==
The film was released on VHS and DVD on 30 July 2002 by Universal Studios Home Video.

== Reception ==
Rotten Tomatoes, a review aggregator, reports that 7% of 125 critics gave the film a positive review; the average rating is 3.65/10. The consensus reads: "Sappy, dull and muddled, Dragonfly is too melancholic and cliched to generate much suspense." On Metacritic it carries the score of 25 out of 100, indicating "generally unfavorable" reviews. Audiences polled by CinemaScore gave the film an average grade of "B+" on an A+ to F scale.
