= The Call (soundtrack) =

The Call (Original Motion Picture Soundtrack)

Film score by John Debney
- Released: March 12, 2013
- Recorded: 2013
- Genre: Film score
- Length: 61:59
- Label: Lakeshore
- Producer: John Debney

John Debney chronology
| Alex Cross (2012) | The Call (2013) | Jobs (2013) |

The Call (Original Motion Picture Soundtrack) is the film score to the 2013 film The Call directed by Brad Anderson, starring Abigail Breslin, Halle Berry, Morris Chestnut, Michael Eklund, Michael Imperioli, and David Otunga. The film score was composed by John Debney and released through Lakeshore Records on March 12, 2013.

== Development ==
John Debney composed the film score. During his first interaction with Anderson, the latter described it as a "very edgy, electronic, in your face" score to be created with found sounds, demanding something out of the box, not necessarily traditional for most of the score, but in certain parts of the emotional scenes. Debney used intense electronic and synthesized elements for most of the scores, though having worked on orchestral music. The emotional moments were underscored with piano and strings. Debney described the film as ten times scarier than The Silence of the Lambs (1991), and the score had to be "very moody, very scary".

The score accompanied a variety of instruments and styles, which was daunting, according to Debney, having to blend those texture and color. His initial idea of the score was to make it different, which was out of the norm, thereby resulting in taking mundane sounds like knocking on a piano top which sounded like a xylophone and the tuning it. He then used those sounds and pitched and filtered them dramatically. He used a sound resembling the ramping up of an industrial electrical motor and an engine for three times, which highlighted the presence of the serial killer Michael (Michael Eklund), and pitched and tuned them to create a jarring atmospheric sound.

== Release ==
The score was released through Lakeshore Records on March 12, 2013.

== Reception ==
James Southall of Movie Wave wrote: "Those who don’t mind going to the extremes of dark, textural atmospheres may well find material here that is greatly rewarding to them; but I suspect most people will be full of admiration for the professional job the composer has done, but will never want to listen to the album again." Andrew Barker of Variety and Roger Moore of The Seattle Times considered the score to be "chilling" and "terriffying", while Jake Coyle of The Hutchinson News mentioned it to be "somewhat good".

== Track listing ==
| No. | Title | Length |
|---|---|---|
| 1. | "Main Title" | 4:43 |
| 2. | "Intruder" | 3:41 |
| 3. | "Leah is Killed" | 1:04 |
| 4. | "Leah's Body Uncovered" | 2:01 |
| 5. | "Tour of the Hive" | 2:10 |
| 6. | "Freeway Chase" | 9:26 |
| 7. | "Casey Calls Jordan" | 2:21 |
| 8. | "Michael Drives" | 1:47 |
| 9. | "Shovel Kill" | 2:35 |
| 10. | "He Switched Cars" | 1:17 |
| 11. | "The Gas Station" | 4:22 |
| 12. | "Message to Mom" | 3:41 |
| 13. | "Don't Hurt That Little Girl" | 1:56 |
| 14. | "Finding The Hiding Hole" | 2:55 |
| 15. | "Assault On The Cabin" | 1:08 |
| 16. | "Casey Sees Too Much" | 0:57 |
| 17. | "Jordan Drives" | 1:02 |
| 18. | "The Cabin" | 1:48 |
| 19. | "Jordan Finds the Room" | 5:05 |
| 20. | "A Gentle Scalping" | 2:34 |
| 21. | "Drowning Jordan" | 1:51 |
| 22. | "It's Already Done" | 3:35 |
| Total length: | | 61:59 |

== Personnel ==
Credits adapted from liner notes:

- Music composer, producer and orchestrator – John Debney
- Soundtrack producer – Brad Anderson, David A. Helfant, Michael A. Helfant
- Synth programming – Clay Duncan, John Debney, Justin Burnett
- Additional arrangements – Justin Burnett
- Sound design – Clay Duncan
- Scoring engineer – Michael Aarvold
- Recording and mixing – Chris Fogel
- Music editor – Jeff Carson, Jim Harrison
- Executive producers – Michael J. Luisi, Robert L. Stein, Brian McNelis, Skip Williamson
- Score production supervisor – Jennifer Davis, Stephanie Pereida
- Technical score advisor – Jaime Hartwick
- Music coordinator – Lola Debney
- A&R director – Eric Craig
- Art direction – John Bergin
