= Happy (2011 film) =

- Promotional poster
- Directed by: Roko Belic
- Written by: Roko Belic
- Produced by: Tom Shadyac; Frances Reid; Eiji Han Shimizu; Roko Belic
- Cinematography: Roko Belic; Adrian Belic
- Edited by: Vivien Hillgrove
- Music by: Mark Adler
- Production companies: Shady Acres Entertainment; Wadi Rum Productions
- Release date: April 9, 2011
- Running time: 73 minutes
- Country: United States
- Language: English
- Budget: $700,000

Happy is a 2011 documentary film directed, written, and co-produced by Roko Belic. It explores human happiness through interviews with people from all walks of life in 14 countries, weaving in the newest findings of positive psychology.

== Synopsis ==
Roko Belic was inspired to create the film after producer/director Tom Shadyac showed him an article in The New York Times titled "A New Measure of Well Being from a Happy Little Kingdom". The article ranks the United States as the 23rd-happiest country in the world. Shadyac then suggested that Belic make a documentary about happiness. Belic spent several years interviewing hundreds of people, from leading happiness researchers to a rickshaw driver in Kolkata, a family living in a cohousing community in Denmark, a woman who was run over by a truck, a Cajun fisherman, and more.

== Production ==
Roko and his brother Adrian Belic shot the film on three Sony Z1U HDV video cameras. They interviewed a number of psychologists around the world, including Ed Diener, a professor of psychology at the University of Illinois; Richard Davidson, a professor at the University of Wisconsin's Lab of Affective Neuroscience; and Sonja Lyubomirsky, professor at the University of California, Riverside and author of The How of Happiness.

=== Post-production ===
Vivien Hillgrove edited the film. Belic received the majority of the budget from Tom Shadyac to complete principal photography and post-production. The filmmakers then turned to crowdsource fundraising website Kickstarter to raise the finishing funds for the film. The Kickstarter campaign raised $36,000 in July 2010.

== See also ==
- Project Happiness
- Genghis Blues
