= Genghis Blues =

1999 American documentary film

- Directed by: Roko Belic
- Produced by: Roko Belic; Adrian Belic
- Starring: Paul Pena
- Edited by: Roko Belic; Adrian Belic
- Music by: Paul Pena; Kongar-ol Ondar
- Production company: Wadi Rum Films
- Distributed by: Roxie Releasing
- Release dates: January 1999 (Sundance Film Festival); July 9, 1999 (U.S. limited); November 30, 2000 (Australia); May 25, 2000 (Germany)
- Running time: 88 minutes
- Country: United States
- Languages: English; Russian; Tuvan

Genghis Blues is a 1999 American documentary film directed by Roko Belic. It centers on the journey of blind American singer Paul Pena to the isolated Russian Republic of Tuva to pursue his interest in Tuvan throat singing.

== Accolades ==
It won the 1999 Sundance Film Festival Audience Award for a Documentary. It was also nominated for an Academy Award in 2000 in the Best Documentary Feature category.

== Synopsis ==
The documentary captures the story of blind blues musician Paul Pena. After a brush with fame and success in the 1970s, Pena's fortunes faded as he dealt with career and health problems.

While listening to shortwave radio, Pena heard a broadcast of Tuvan throat singing, the art of manipulating overtones while singing to make higher frequencies more distinguishable, essentially making it possible to sing two notes at once. Pena, over the course of several years, taught himself to throat sing to a very impressive degree. He eventually attended a concert of throat singing and, after the concert, impressed one of the throat singers, Kongar-ol Ondar, who invited him to visit Tuva, a republic of the Russian Federation and a formerly independent country from 1921 to 1944, under the name of the People's Republic of Tannu Tuva, and the home of throat singing, to sing in the triennial throat singing festival held there.

The entire journey, as well as the extraordinary mix of cultures and music, is captured in the documentary.

== Production ==
The Belic brothers shot the film with two Hi8 camcorders and edited it themselves. They were allowed to edit the film during nighttime at a professional editing facility. It took them three and a half years to finish the film after they shot it. All this time they lived on $500 a month in an apartment above an auto repair shop. Christopher Nolan, a longtime friend of the brothers, is credited for his "editorial assistance."

== Reception ==
On review aggregator website Rotten Tomatoes, the film holds an approval rating of 82% based on 11 reviews, with an average rating of 7.7/10.
