= Beyond the Call =

- Directed by: Adrian Belic
- Written by: Adrian Belic
- Produced by: Adrian Belic
- Cinematography: Adrian Belic
- Edited by: Jennifer Chinlund
- Music by: Marcello De Francisci
- Release date: April 26, 2006 (Tribeca)
- Running time: 82 minutes
- Country: United States
- Language: English

Beyond the Call is a 2006 documentary film about three middle-aged men who are former soldiers and modern-day knights. They travel the world delivering life-saving humanitarian aid directly into the hands of civilians and doctors in some of the most dangerous places on Earth, the front lines of war. It is the directorial debut of Adrian Belic.

PBS aired a 60-minute version of Beyond the Call on January 23, 2007 as part of its Independent Lens series.

== Synopsis ==
Ed Artis, Jim Laws, and Walt Ratterman are former soldiers and modern-day knights. They travel the world delivering life-saving humanitarian aid directly into the hands of civilians and doctors on the front lines of war.

They are self-styled Knights of Malta. In 1995, they formed Knightsbridge International, a humanitarian aid organization, whose motto is "High Adventure and Service to Humanity." They have traveled to places such as Afghanistan, Albania, Chechnya, Cambodia, Burma, Thailand, Rwanda, and the southern Philippines.

Walt Ratterman died afterwards in the 2010 Haiti earthquake.
