= Justin Cooper (actor) =

American producer and actor (born 1988)

- Born: November 17, 1988 (age 38); Los Angeles, California, U.S.
- Occupations: Actor, producer
- Years active: 1993–2003

Justin Cooper (born November 17, 1988) is an American former child actor. He has starred in the film Liar Liar and in the sitcom Brother's Keeper. He serves as an executive producer of The Ben Maller Show on Fox Sports Radio.

== Filmography ==
Year	Title	Role	Notes
1993	Full House	Linus Plankin	Episode: "Support Your Local Parents"
1994–95	The Boys Are Back	Nicky Hansen	18 episodes
1995	ER	Kid	Episode: "What Life?"
1996	General Hospital	Lucas Jones	Episode: "#1.8633"
1997	Boy Meets World	Ryan	Episode: "Uncle Daddy"
1997	Liar Liar	Max Reede	
1998	The Magnificent Seven	Billy Travis	Episode: "Witness"
1998	Dennis the Menace Strikes Again	Dennis Mitchell	Direct-to-video
1998–99	Brother's Keeper	Oscar Waide	23 episodes
2001	All About Us	Mike Alcott	3 episodes
2003	The Practice	Timothy Graham	Episode: "Final Judgment"
