= Elisabet Sahtouris =

American biologist

Elisabet Sahtouris (January 23, 1936 - December 21, 2024) was an evolutionary biologist, futurist, speaker, author and sustainability consultant. She was a US and Greek citizen who lived in the US, Canada, Greece, Peru and Spain while lecturing, doing workshops and media appearances on all continents. She earned a PhD from Dalhousie University in Canada. During her lifetime, she consulted with corporations and government organizations in Australia, Brazil, Europe, Asia, Africa and the United States.

Sahtouris co-convened two symposia on the foundations of science in Hokkaido and Kuala Lumpur. She was Professor in Residence at Chaminade University in Honolulu, Hawaii, teaching in the School of Business & Communication MBA Program and helping redesign it for entrepreneurship in local living economies. She was a member of the Evolutionary Leaders and a founding member of Rising Women; Rising World.

She appeared in films including Occupy Love, I Am, Femme, Love Thy Nature and Money & Life. Her books include EarthDance: Living Systems in Evolution, A Walk Through Time: from Stardust to Us, Biology Revisioned (with Willis Harman), and Gaia’s Dance: The Story of Earth & Us.

== Works ==
Papers

Ecosophy article at: http://www.kosmosjournal.org/article/ecosophy-natures-guide-to-a-better-world/

- After Darwin
- Skills for the Age of Sustainability
- Living Systems in Evolution

Books

- Earthdance - Living Systems in Evolution
- Biology Revisioned, with Willis Harman, North Atlantic Publishers 1998. ISBN 1-55643-267-4
- A Walk Through Time: From Stardust to Us
- Gaia's Dance: The Story of Earth & Us
