= Tom Shadyac =

American film director (born 1958)

- Shadyac in 2011
- Born: Thomas Peter Shadyac; December 11, 1958 (age 67); Falls Church, Virginia, U.S.
- Education: University of Virginia
- Occupations: Film director, producer, author
- Years active: 1984–present
- Notable work: Ace Ventura: Pet Detective; The Nutty Professor; Liar Liar; Patch Adams; Bruce Almighty; I Am

Thomas Peter Shadyac (born December 11, 1958) is an American film director, producer, and writer. The youngest joke-writer ever for comedian Bob Hope, Shadyac is widely known for writing and directing the comedy films Ace Ventura: Pet Detective (1994), The Nutty Professor (1996), Liar Liar (1997), Patch Adams (1998), and Bruce Almighty (2003). In 2010, Shadyac retired from the comedy genre and wrote, directed, and narrated his own documentary film I Am, that explores his abandonment of a materialistic lifestyle following his involvement in a bicycle accident three years earlier.

Shadyac is a former professor of communication at Pepperdine University's Seaver College. In 2011, he was a participant in the Conference on World Affairs. In 2015, Shadyac began teaching film at the University of Colorado Boulder, beginning with that year's Spring semester. Shadyac teaches film at the University of Memphis.

== Early life ==
Shadyac was born in Falls Church, Virginia to Julie and Richard Shadyac, a lawyer. His mother was of Lebanese descent, while his father was of half-Irish and half-Lebanese ancestry. His mother, who died of cancer in 1998, had become semi-quadriplegic and spent much of Shadyac's adult life in a wheelchair.

Shadyac attended J. E. B. Stuart High School in Falls Church, where he had played basketball, participated in the Key Club, and made the Junior National and National Honor Societies. In both 1975 and 1976, Shadyac was included in the now-defunct "Who's Who Among High School Students" book, prior to his graduation in 1976.

As a pre-law student at the University of Virginia, Shadyac produced a poster entitled "Are You a Preppie?" Borrowing from the style of National Lampoon magazine, and based on the large number of preppies in Charlottesville and nearby Richmond, Virginia, the poster preceded the more well-known The Official Preppy Handbook. The poster went into multiple printings and served as a fundraiser for his fraternity, Sigma Chi.

Shadyac graduated from UVA in 1981, and later received his master's degree in film from the UCLA Film School in 1989, after completing the critically acclaimed short film Tom, Dick and Harry.

== Career ==
=== Filmmaking ===
Shadyac moved to Los Angeles in 1983 and, at age 24, was Bob Hope's staff joke writer. Shadyac briefly acted during the 1980s, appearing in an episode of Magnum, P.I. and in the 1987 film Jocks. He then worked on movies-of-the-week, rewritten and directed for 20th Century Fox.

Ace Ventura: Pet Detective was Shadyac's first major film and featured an up-and-coming Jim Carrey, described by Shadyac as "the only white guy in Living Color." Following Ace Ventura: Pet Detective, Shadyac attained a prominent status in Hollywood and received frequent offers from significant figures in the comedy industry, keen to collaborate with him. He frequently cast Carrey in lead roles and his hit films with Carrey include Bruce Almighty and Liar Liar.

Examples of other Shadyac films include his collaboration with Eddie Murphy on The Nutty Professor movie series; Patch Adams, starring Robin Williams; Dragonfly with Kevin Costner; and Evan Almighty, the sequel to Bruce Almighty with Steve Carell. He was also the executive producer of the ABC TV series 8 Simple Rules for Dating My Teenage Daughter. His company Shady Acres Entertainment had an overall deal with Universal in 1999.

In his 2011 documentary I Am, which follows Shadyac in the aftermath of a bicycle accident in which he suffered significant injuries, he interviews scientists, religious leaders, environmentalists and philosophers, including David Suzuki, Desmond Tutu, Noam Chomsky, Lynne McTaggart, Elisabet Sahtouris, Howard Zinn and Thom Hartmann. The film asks two central questions: What’s Wrong With the World? and What Can We Do About it? The film is about "human connectedness, happiness, and the human spirit," and explores Shadyac's personal journey, "the nature of humanity" and the "world's ever-growing addiction to materialism." The film received a 23-minute standing ovation at its premiere screening.

=== Author ===
In 2013 Shadyac published a book entitled Life's Operating Manual and appeared on HBO's live broadcast show Real Time with Bill Maher as part of the promotional campaign. The book was published by Hay House on April 30, 2013 and in his review for the New York Journal of Books, Martin A. David states:

Many, if not most, of Mr. Shadyac’s elucidations are mundane truisms. But this absolutely does not discredit them ... Books like his are frequently read by people who already understand the messages contained but desire booster shots of energizing inspirations. Preaching to the choir is not a bad thing, but the preacher has to do something more to keep the choir awake ... Tom Shadyac’s view of what we need to keep our world from continuing on its downward spiral would have carried more gravitas had he said it better and with more convincing clarity. It would, indeed, be helpful if a how-to book for existence were available.

=== Other work ===
Shadyac is a former adjunct professor of communication at Pepperdine University's Seaver College. In 2011 he was a participant in the Conference on World Affairs. In 2015, Shadyac began teaching film at the University of Colorado Boulder, beginning with that year's Spring semester, Shadyac now teaches film at the University of Memphis.

On March 22, 2018, Shadyac opened the doors to his newest project: Memphis Rox climbing gym. Located in South Memphis, it is a non-profit, pay-what-you-can climbing gym and community center. Memphis Rox also features weight lifting, climbing specific training, treadmills & other cardio, and classes in Yoga, Meditation, Tai Chi, and Senior Fitness. It is across the street from the Stax Museum of American soul music.

== Personal life ==
Shadyac was married to Jennifer Barker in 1997. They eventually divorced.

In 2007, Shadyac suffered post-concussion syndrome after a bicycle accident in Virginia, and experienced a prolonged period of acute headaches and hyper-sensitivity to light and sound. The injury followed the cumulative effects of previous mild head injuries Shadyac had suffered from surfing, mountain biking, and playing basketball. Shadyac was forced to sleep in a darkened closet in his house due to a constant ringing in his ears that lasted beyond a six-month period, and his treating doctors were unable to determine if and when the ringing would cease. Shadyac later explained: "I felt suicidal at points. It was a disaster."

Following his eventual recovery from the 2007 accident, Shadyac sold the bulk of his possessions, donated significant amounts of money, opened a homeless shelter in Charlottesville, Virginia, and made a key donation to an initiative in Telluride, Colorado to set aside a natural area at the town's entrance. He sold his 17,000-square-foot (1,600 m^{2}) Los Angeles mansion and moved into the exclusive Paradise Cove trailer park in Malibu, California. Shadyac sought to reorient and simplify his life; he removed himself from the film industry and wrote about his experience in Life's Operating Manual. When he was later asked if his change of direction would have occurred if he had not experienced the concussion, Shadyac replied:

I was already reevaluating the dissonance between making all this money and being on the set with people, the crew, many of whom couldn't afford the basic needs of their families. It didn't seem fair to me. So I don't think the concussion did it although it was definitely a crisis and crisis will often trigger things like this. I didn't give up everything to be happy. In fact, I'm not even sure what happiness is. Happiness comes from the word "happenstance" which relates to things going on outside of you. What was happening to me was definitely on the inside. But after I gave up everything I felt a lot more joy in my life. A lot more contentment. There's nothing wrong, though, with making a lot of money ... this is not a judgment on anyone at all. I was just taking in a lot more than I needed and this wasn't good for me.

His father, Richard C. Shadyac Sr., a Washington, D.C. attorney, was a longtime friend of comedian, actor and TV producer Danny Thomas, a fellow Lebanese-American. Thomas's charity and lifelong efforts were aimed at the founding and development of St. Jude Children's Research Hospital in Memphis, Tennessee. Richard C. Shadyac Sr. served as the CEO of St. Jude's fundraising arm, American Lebanese Syrian Associated Charities (ALSAC), from 1992 to 2005, and died in September 2009 in McLean, Virginia. His brother, Richard C. Shadyac Jr., worked as an attorney in the Washington area for 27 years and had joined the board of ALSAC in 2000. In September 2009 Richard C. Shadyac Jr. was appointed president and chief executive officer of ALSAC in Memphis.

After filming I Am, Shadyac moved to Memphis, where he continued philanthropic work but tried to continue with moviemaking projects. He lamented during production of Brian Banks:

"I've been trying to get a gig for about 10 years. I can't tell you how many jobs I applied for where they just didn't hire me. I had left the private club, and the private club didn't want me back in."

Shadyac is an outspoken Catholic, and stated in a 2013 interview that he equates the concept of "God" with "mystery source."

== Filmography ==
Year	Title	Director	Producer	Writer	Notes
1991	Frankenstein: The College Years	Yes	No	No	TV movie
1994	Ace Ventura: Pet Detective	Yes	No	Yes	Co-written with Jack Bernstein and Jim Carrey
1996	The Nutty Professor	Yes	No	Yes	
1997	Liar Liar	Yes	No	No	
1998	Patch Adams	Yes	executive	No	
2002	Dragonfly	Yes	Yes	No	
2003	Bruce Almighty	Yes	Yes	No	
2007	Evan Almighty	Yes	Yes	No	
2010	I Am	Yes	No	Yes	Documentary
2018	Brian Banks	Yes	No	No	

Executive producer

- Nutty Professor II: The Klumps (2000)
- Finding Kind (2010) (Documentary)
- Happy (2011) (Documentary)

Producer

- Accepted (2006)
- I Now Pronounce You Chuck & Larry (2007)

=== Acting roles ===
Year	Title	Role	Notes
1984	Magnum, P.I.	Danny (Student)	TV show
1987	Jocks	Chris	
2010	I Am	Himself	
2012	Full Scale	Nate	

== Accolades ==
Award	Category	Subject	Result
Cleveland International Film Festival	Best American Independent Feature Film	Brian Banks	Won
Golden Raspberry Award	Worst Picture	I Now Pronounce You Chuck & Larry	Nominated
Humanitas Prize	Documentaries – Special Awards Category	I Am	Won
LA Film Festival	Audience Award for Best Fiction Feature	Brian Banks	Won
New Media Film Festival	Grand Prize	I Am	Won
