= Liar Liar =

1997 American film by Tom Shadyac

- Theatrical release poster
- Directed by: Tom Shadyac
- Written by: Paul Guay; Stephen Mazur
- Produced by: Brian Grazer
- Starring: Jim Carrey; Maura Tierney; Cary Elwes; Jennifer Tilly; Swoosie Kurtz; Amanda Donohoe; Anne Haney; Justin Cooper
- Cinematography: Russell Boyd
- Edited by: Don Zimmerman
- Music by: John Debney; James Newton Howard (theme)
- Production company: Imagine Entertainment
- Distributed by: Universal Pictures
- Release dates: March 18, 1997 (Universal Amphitheatre); March 21, 1997 (United States)
- Running time: 86 minutes
- Country: United States
- Language: English
- Budget: $45–65 million
- Box office: $303 million

Liar Liar is a 1997 American comedy film directed by Tom Shadyac and written by Paul Guay and Stephen Mazur. It stars Jim Carrey as a lawyer who is cursed to speak only the truth for a day. He struggles to maintain his career and to reconcile with his ex-wife and son whom he alienated with his pathological lying. It was the second of three collaborations between Carrey and Shadyac, after Ace Ventura: Pet Detective (1994) and before Bruce Almighty (2003).

Liar Liar premiered at the Universal Amphitheatre on March 18, 1997 and was released in the United States on March 21, 1997 by Universal Pictures. It received positive reviews, and grossed $303 million against a budget of $45 million. At the 55th Golden Globe Awards, Carrey was nominated for Best Actor.

== Plot ==
Fletcher Reede is a divorced defense lawyer living in Los Angeles who loves spending time with his young son, Max. However, he has a habit of giving inappropriate precedence to his career, breaking promises to Max and his ex-wife Audrey, and then lying about the reasons. After Fletcher misses Max's fifth birthday party when senior partner Miranda lures him into having sex in the office to land a promotion, Max makes a birthday wish for his father to be honest for one day.

Unaware of his son's wish, Fletcher soon discovers that he is unable to lie, mislead, or withhold the truth. This alienates him from Miranda and his secretary Greta, gets his car impounded when he confesses all of his traffic infractions and unpaid parking tickets to a police officer, and causes him an inability to bend the truth in court.

Fletcher's newest client is Samantha Cole, a gold digger who wants to get around a prenuptial agreement with her soon-to-be ex-husband, Richard. The main witness, Kenneth Falk, with whom Samantha has been having sex, is eager to lie when he takes the stand. However, Fletcher finds in court that his inability to lie includes not being able to suborn perjury. Meanwhile, Audrey is considering a move to Boston with Jerry, who proposed upon receiving a job offer there. Although they have not been together long, she accepts, to protect Max from future disappointments that Fletcher may cause him. Catching wind of Fletcher's inability to lie, Miranda tries to get him fired by baiting him into insulting Mr. Allan, a senior partner at the firm, but this fails when Mr. Allan and his board mistake Fletcher's accurate insults for lighthearted roasting.

Fletcher's erratic behavior in court soon leads to him staging an assault on himself in the bathroom, but he is unable to lie his way into a continuance, specifically because his only possible grounds were, "I can't lie." Knowing that he cannot refute the proof of Samantha's adultery, her grousing accidentally reveals her real age. He successfully disputes the validity of her prenup, signed as a minor without parental consent. The judge rules Samantha is entitled to half of Richard's marital assets, allowing Fletcher to win the case truthfully. However, Samantha then pivots to demanding custody of their children for extra child support payments. Realizing that winning the case has punished a loving father and his children, Fletcher demands the judge reverse the decision, but his attitude angers the judge, who then has him arrested for contempt of court.

Fletcher calls Audrey to bail him out, but she informs him that their plane leaves for Boston that night. Greta, realizing he turned over a new leaf, pays his bail. Fletcher rushes to the airport, but Audrey and Max's plane has left the gate. In desperation, he hijacks a mobile stairway to pursue the plane onto the runway. He manages to get the plane to stop, but then causes an accident with a baggage train, injuring both his legs. On a stretcher, Fletcher vows to Max that he will spend more time with him. He says that despite the fact that he is free to lie now that the 24 hours have elapsed, it feels clearer to be honest. Max believes him, and Audrey, encouraged by Jerry, decides to remain in California.

One year later, Fletcher and Audrey are celebrating Max's sixth birthday. Max makes a birthday wish, only to find that Fletcher and Audrey are kissing when the lights come back on. Fletcher asks Max if he wished for them to get back together, but he says he only wished for rollerblades.

== Cast ==
- Jim Carrey as Fletcher Reede
- Maura Tierney as Audrey Reede
- Justin Cooper as Max Reede
- Cary Elwes as Jerry
- Anne Haney as Greta
- Jennifer Tilly as Samantha Cole
- Swoosie Kurtz as Dana Appleton
- Jason Bernard as Judge Marshall Stevens
- Mitchell Ryan as Mr. Allan
- Amanda Donohoe as Miranda
- Eric Pierpoint as Richard Cole
- Chip Mayer as Kenneth Falk
- Cheri Oteri as Jane
- Randall "Tex" Cobb as Skull
- SW Fisher as Pete
- Ben Lemon as Randy
- Jarrad Paul as Zit Boy
- Marianne Muellerleile as Ms. Berry
- Stephen James Carver as Police Officer
- Krista Allen as Lady in Elevator
- Don Keefer as Beggar at Courthouse

In addition to portraying Fletcher Reede, Carrey has a cameo appearance as Fire Marshall Bill at the end of the film, seeing to Reede's injuries after he crashes a mobile stairway, reprising his role from In Living Color. Liar Liar was the film debut of actress Sara Paxton, who played one of Max's classmates who attends his birthday party. It was also the last film to feature Don Keefer, who retired in 1997 before he died in 2014, and Jason Bernard, who died shortly after filming was completed. The film was dedicated in Bernard's memory.

== Production ==
The film was shot from July 8 to October 16, 1996, in Los Angeles. In an interview, Carrey said filming the film was very physically demanding on him, "because it was this constant suppression of angst, completely freaking out all the time. I would go home with total exhaustion." The script was rejected by numerous Hollywood studios until it was picked up by Brian Grazer and Imagine Entertainment. The role of Fletcher Reede was envisioned for Tom Hanks and Steve Martin. Hugh Grant was interested in the role, but backed out due to the Divine Brown scandal. In order to star in the film, Carrey chose not to play the role of Dr. Evil in Austin Powers: International Man of Mystery. Cary Elwes was commissioned to portray the role of Jerry by "pure chance", having previously worked with Shadyac.

== Reception ==
=== Box office ===
The film is the second of three collaborations between Jim Carrey and Tom Shadyac, all of which did extremely well at the box office. (Note: The first collaboration, Ace Ventura: Pet Detective, made $107.2 million against a budget of $15 million, and the third, Bruce Almighty, made $484.6 million against a budget of $81 million.) Liar Liar made $31,423,025 in 2,845 theaters on its opening weekend. It was the second-highest, three-day opener ever for Universal Pictures, only coming second to Jurassic Park. The film also surpassed Teenage Mutant Ninja Turtles to have the largest March opening weekend. It would hold this record for five years until it was taken by Ice Age in 2002. At the time of its opening, Liar Liar had the second-highest opening weekend for an Imagine Entertainment film, behind Ransom. Additionally, it achieved the widest release for a Jim Carrey film, a record that lasted until June 2000 when Me, Myself & Irene debuted. The film was ranked number one during its first weekend, beating both the Special Edition release of Return of the Jedi and Selena. It stayed at the top of the box office for a total of three weeks before being overtaken by Anaconda. By late April 1997, Liar Liar had already surpassed the Special Edition release of Star Wars to become the top-grossing film of the year. In North America, it made $181,410,615, and at the box office in other territories it made $121,300,000 for a total of $302,710,615. In Denmark, Liar Liar earned $453,000 in its opening weekend, making it the third-highest opening for any Universal film in the country, after Twister and Jurassic Park.

=== Critical response ===
The film received positive reviews from critics. On Rotten Tomatoes, it has a rating of 83%, based on 63 reviews, with an average rating of 6.90/10. The site's critical consensus reads, "Despite its thin plot, Liar Liar is elevated by Jim Carrey's exuberant brand of physical humor, and the result is a laugh riot that helped to broaden the comedian's appeal." On Metacritic, it has a score of 70 out of 100, based on 20 critics, indicating "generally favorable" reviews. Audiences polled by CinemaScore gave it an "A−" grade from an A+ to F scale.

Roger Ebert of the Chicago Sun-Times gave the film three out of four and wrote, "I am gradually developing a suspicion, or perhaps it is a fear, that Jim Carrey is growing on me," as he had given negative reviews to his previous films Dumb and Dumber and Ace Ventura: Pet Detective.

Some critics noted similarities between the plot with that of an episode of The Twilight Zone entitled "The Whole Truth" where a used-car salesman comes into ownership of a car that is haunted and forces him to tell the truth so long as he owns it. In particular, one scene that bears a resemblance to an element used in Liar Liar is the part where the salesman's assistant asks for a raise, and he is compelled to come clean that there is no raise.

== Accolades ==
Award	Date of ceremony	Category	Recipient(s)	Result	Ref.
ASCAP Film and Television Music Awards	April 28, 1998	Top Box Office Films	John Debney (Note: Nominated for his work on both Liar Liar and I Know What You Did Last Summer)	Won (Note: Tied with 11 other composers, including James Horner, Elliot Goldenthal, and James Newton Howard)	
Golden Globe Awards	January 18, 1998	Best Actor in a Motion Picture – Musical or Comedy	Jim Carrey	Nominated	
MTV Movie & TV Awards	May 30, 1998	Best Comedic Performance	Jim Carrey	Won	
Nickelodeon Kids' Choice Awards	April 4, 1998	Favorite Movie	Liar Liar	Nominated	
Nickelodeon Kids' Choice Awards	April 4, 1998	Favorite Movie Actor	Jim Carrey	Nominated	
People's Choice Awards	January 11, 1998	Favorite Comedy Motion Picture	Liar Liar	Won	
Young Artist Award	March 14, 1998	Best Performance in a Feature Film: Young Actor Age Ten or Under	Justin Cooper	Nominated	

American Film Institute recognition:

- AFI's 100 Years...100 Laughs – Nominated

== Home media ==
The film was released for VHS and LaserDisc on September 30, 1997, by Universal Studios Home Video. The DVD was released on January 20, 1998, in full screen format. DTS Full Screen and Collector's Edition Widescreen versions were also released on DVD the following year. The Blu-ray with Multi-Format (including a digital copy and UltraViolet) was released on July 9, 2013. It was also released on the 1990s Best of the Decade Edition on Blu-ray and re-released on October 16, 2018. A new DVD was re-released on May 10, 2016, by Universal Pictures Home Entertainment. A remastered 25th Anniversary edition was released on Blu-ray through Shout! Factory on January 18, 2022.
