= Robert W. Cort =

American film producer

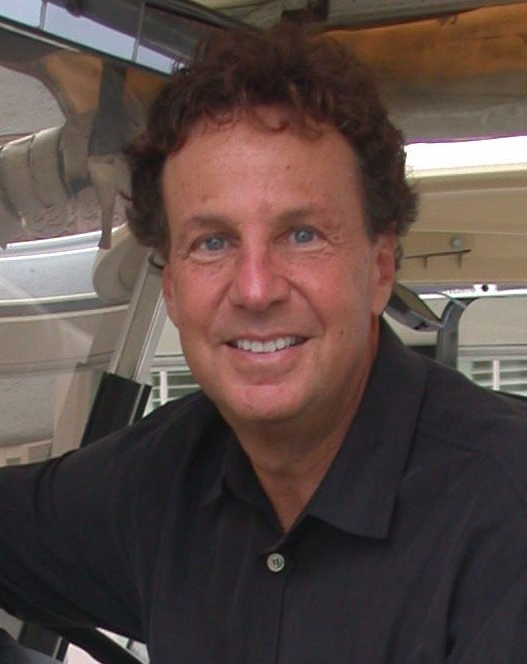
- Robert W. Cort
- Born: January 13, 1951 (age 75); Brooklyn, New York City, United States
- Occupation: Producer
- Years active: 1976–present
- Spouse: Rosalie Swedlin

Robert W. Cort (born January 13, 1951) is an American film producer. Since 1985, he has produced forty-eight feature films, which have grossed more than $2.5 billion in worldwide box office. These include On the Basis of Sex, Three Men and a Baby, Cocktail, Jumanji, Bill & Ted's Excellent Adventure, Revenge of the Nerds II: Nerds in Paradise, The Cutting Edge, Against the Ropes, Runaway Bride, and Save the Last Dance.

Cort also produced Mr. Holland's Opus, and currently serves on the board of directors for the Mr. Holland's Opus Foundation.

Cort’s HBO film Something the Lord Made won three Emmy Awards, including the 2004 Outstanding Film Made for Television. The film also won the American Film Institute Award, the Director's and Writer's Guild Awards, the Christopher, NAACP Image Award and the prestigious Peabody Award. His other television films have also won multiple honors, including the 1990 Emmy for Outstanding Children's Program for A Mother's Courage: The Mary Thomas Story.

His production of the family drama Im Winter ein Jahr (English title: A Year Ago in Winter) won the Silver Lola for Best Picture at the 2009 German Academy Awards.

== Career history ==
Cort entered the motion picture industry in 1976, and one year later was named vice president of advertising, publicity and promotion for Columbia Pictures. In 1980, he became executive vice president of marketing for Fox. In his five years as a marketing chief, Cort planned and supervised the campaigns of such films as Close Encounters of the Third Kind, Midnight Express, The China Syndrome, All That Jazz, The Empire Strikes Back and Nine to Five. He then served as executive vice president of production at Twentieth Century Fox, where he oversaw the making of Romancing the Stone, Bachelor Party, and Revenge of the Nerds.

For the next eleven years, Cort was a partner and president of Interscope Communications. From 1996 to 2001, he was the managing partner with David Madden of the Cort/Madden Company, a production unit with close ties to Paramount Pictures. He currently operates Robert Cort Productions, an independent production company.

Cort was a partner and president of Interscope Communications.

From 1996 to 2001, he was the managing partner of the Cort/Madden Company, a production unit with close ties to Paramount Pictures.

In 2003, Random House published Cort's novel, Action!, which garnered positive critical reviews and became a bestseller.

His articles and essays have been published in The New York Times and The New Yorker. He is currently a professor of production on the faculty of the American Film Institute.

Prior to working in the entertainment industry, Cort earned BA and MA degrees in history from the University of Pennsylvania and an MBA from the Wharton School, and was a management consultant for McKinsey & Company.

He lives in Beverly Hills, California, with his wife, Rosalie Swedlin, a manager of writers and directors.

== Filmography ==
He was a producer in all films unless otherwise noted.

=== Film ===
Year	Film	Credit	Notes
1985	Turk 182	Executive producer	
1987	Critical Condition		
1987	Outrageous Fortune		
1987	Revenge of the Nerds II: Nerds in Paradise		
1987	Three Men and a Baby		
1988	The Seventh Sign		
1988	Cocktail		
1989	Bill & Ted's Excellent Adventure	Executive producer	
1989	Collision Course		
1989	Renegades	Executive producer	
1989	Blind Fury	Executive producer	
1989	An Innocent Man		
1990	The First Power	Executive producer	
1990	Bird on a Wire	Executive producer	
1990	Arachnophobia	Co-executive producer	
1990	A Gnome Named Gnorm		
1990	Three Men and a Little Lady		
1991	Eve of Destruction	Executive producer	
1991	Class Action		
1991	Bill & Ted's Bogus Journey	Executive producer	
1991	Paradise	Executive producer	
1992	The Hand That Rocks the Cradle	Executive producer	
1992	The Cutting Edge		
1992	FernGully: The Last Rainforest	Executive producer	
1992	Jersey Girl	Executive producer	
1992	The Gun in Betty Lou's Handbag	Executive producer	
1992	Out on a Limb	Executive producer	
1994	The Air Up There		
1994	Holy Matrimony	Executive producer	
1994	Terminal Velocity	Executive producer	
1994	Imaginary Crimes	Executive producer	
1995	Roommates		
1995	Separate Lives	Executive producer	
1995	Operation Dumbo Drop	Executive producer	
1995	The Tie That Binds	Executive producer	
1995	Two Much	Executive producer	
1995	Jumanji	Executive producer	
1995	Mr. Holland's Opus		
1996	The Arrival	Executive producer	
1996	Boys	Executive producer	
1996	Kazaam	Executive producer	
1996	The Associate	Executive producer	
1998	The Odd Couple II		
1999	The Out-of-Towners		
1999	Runaway Bride		
2001	Save the Last Dance		
2004	Against the Ropes		
2006	Save the Last Dance 2	Executive producer	Direct-to-video
2008	A Year Ago in Winter	Executive producer	
2013	Make Your Move		
2015	Terminator Genisys	Executive producer	
2018	On the Basis of Sex		
2020	The Secret: Dare to Dream		
TBA	The Tale of the Allergist's Wife		

Thanks

Year	Film	Role
2013	The Call	Special thanks

=== Television ===
Year	Title	Credit	Notes
1989	A Mother's Courage: The Mary Thomas Story	Executive producer	Television film
1994	A Part of the Family	Executive producer	Television film
1995	Body Language	Executive producer	Television film
1997	Snow White: A Tale of Terror	Executive producer	Television film
1999	In the Company of Spies		Television film
2000	Harlan County War	Executive producer	Television film
2002	The Rats	Executive producer	Television film
2002	Save the Last Dance		Television pilot
2004	Something the Lord Made	Executive producer	Television film
2005	VH1 News Presents: Hollywood Secrets Revealed: Movie Screw Ups		
