= Three men =

Three men can refer to:

- Triumvirate, rule by three men
- Three men and a baby, a 1987 American film
