= Radar Pictures =

Film production company

Radar Pictures, Inc.
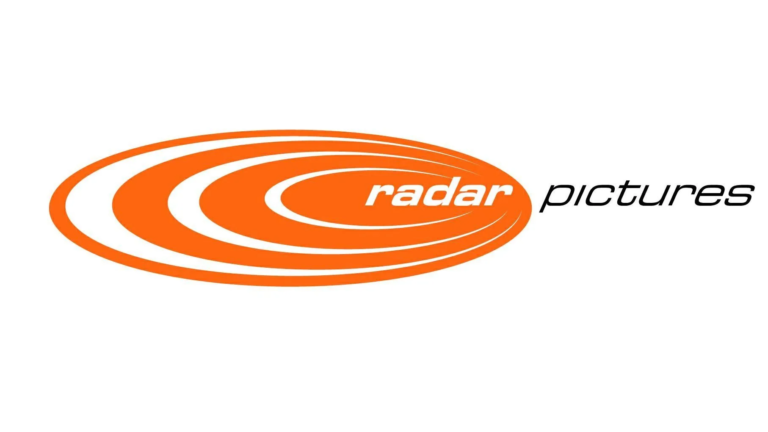
- Industry: Film; Television
- Predecessor: Interscope Communications
- Founded: 1999; 27 years ago
- Founder: Ted Field
- Headquarters: United States
- Key people: Ted Field

Radar Pictures, Inc. is an American motion picture production company that was formed in 1999 by Ted Field, after obtaining the assets of Interscope Communications.

== History ==
In 2000, Interscope Communications was spun off after Field bought out a share of the company's assets from USA Films and became Radar Pictures, and acquired the use of Interscope's film library in its development slate, as well as its set of features that were slated to be Interscope productions. Ted Field continued to partner with longtime Interscope partner Scott Kroopf at Radar Pictures.

In 2001, the company struck a deal with Good Machine International to handle sale of the company's film productions. The deal does not include existing projects that were set up at other studios. The company's first film, They, was released in 2002. Good Machine eventually merged with USA Films and Universal Focus to form Focus Features, which inherited sales of Radar's productions for several years.

Also that year, the company formed a partnership with Michael Bay, Brad Fuller and Andrew Form, to start Platinum Dunes, with a deal at Radar Pictures. Only three pictures came out of the deal, which are remakes of The Texas Chainsaw Massacre, Horsemen and The Amityville Horror.

Later that year, the company signed deals with TMG/Concorde, Lauren Film and Sandrew Metronome to market films for the European market. In 2002, Peter Berg, who attempted to do Truck 44, struck a deal with the company. Also that year, former United Artists executive Lindsay Doran signed a two-year deal with the studio.

In 2004, Scott Kroopf, who was a longtime partner, left Radar to join Intermedia. That year, the company started partnerships with A. Demetrius (Tony) Brown to form Radar & CMX Entertainment to produce urban and Latin projects, and a deal with Core Digital Pictures, to develop CGI-animated feature films for kids. In 2006, the company begin setting up its own independent financing structure to finance 25 studio films with $20 million budgets for the next few years. In 2007, the company begin financing films with Media Rights Capital and Warner Bros. Pictures to fund two films.

In 2015, the company partnered with Paul Kampf Studios to develop and produce micro-budget feature films. In 2016, the company signed a deal with Rodney Henry to start a joint venture Protege Media to develop film and television projects. Also that year, the company was sued by BMG Rights Management, claiming Radar's film slate was fraudulent. In 2018, Chris Van Allsburg and Radar Pictures set up a deal with 20th Century Fox to produce films based on his literary titles. In 2022, the company signed a deal with Buchwald for representation.

== Filmography ==
Radar Pictures has produced 30 films. Of the 30 films produced, only 4 are direct-to-video or made-for-television productions. Note that in all cases the distributor or distributors are also co-producers. The box office column reflects the worldwide gross for the theatrical release of the films in United States dollars.

=== Feature films ===
Year	Title	Director	Co-production company(s)	Distributor(s)	Box office	Ref.
2002	They	Robert Harmon		Dimension Films/ Focus Features	$16,446,271	
2003	How to Deal	Clare Kilner	Golden Mean Productions	New Line Cinema/ Focus Features	$14,308,132	
2003	Le Divorce	James Ivory	Merchant Ivory Productions	Fox Searchlight Pictures	$12,991,996	
2003	The Texas Chainsaw Massacre	Marcus Nispel	Platinum Dunes/ Next Entertainment	New Line Cinema/ Focus Features	$107,364,583	
2003	The Last Samurai	Edward Zwick	The Bedford Falls Company/ Cruise/Wagner Productions	Warner Bros. Pictures	$454,627,263	
2003	Evil Alien Conquerors ^{1}	Chris Matheson	Good Machine International/ Nada Pictures	First Look Pictures	—	
2004	The Chronicles of Riddick	David Twohy	One Race Films	Universal Pictures	$115,900,534	
2005	Son of the Mask	Lawrence Guterman	Dark Horse Entertainment	New Line Cinema	$59,981,548	
2005	The Amityville Horror	Andrew Douglas	Platinum Dunes	Metro-Goldwyn-Mayer/ Dimension Films	$107,516,369	
2005	Zathura: A Space Adventure	Jon Favreau	Michael De Luca Productions/ Teitler Film	Columbia Pictures	$65,079,236	
2006	Waist Deep	Vondie Curtis-Hall	Intrepid Pictures	Rogue Pictures	$21,353,303	
2007	The Heartbreak Kid	Peter Farrelly; Bobby Farrelly	Davis Entertainment/ Conundrum Entertainment	DreamWorks Pictures/ Paramount Pictures	$128,453,183	
2008	Swing Vote	Joshua Michael Stern	Treehouse Films/ 1821 Pictures	Touchstone Pictures	$17,635,397	
2009	Horseman	Jonas Åkerlund	Platinum Dunes/ Mandate Pictures	Lionsgate Films	$2,405,815	
2009	All About Steve	Phil Traill	Fox 2000 Pictures/ Fortis Films	20th Century Fox	$40,105,542	
2009	The Invention of Lying	Ricky Gervais; Matthew Robinson	Media Rights Capital/ Lynda Obst Productions/ Lin Pictures	Warner Bros. Pictures/ Focus Features	$32,406,507	
2009	The Box	Richard Kelly	Media Rights Capital/ Lin Pictures	Warner Bros. Pictures/ The Weinstein Company	$33,333,531	
2009	Everybody's Fine	Kirk Jones	Hollywood Gang	Miramax Films	$16,443,609	
2010	Twelve	Joel Schumacher	Original Media/ Gaumont	Hannover House	$2,648,195	
2012	Spring Breakers	Harmony Korine	Muse Productions/ Annapurna Pictures/ Division Films	A24	$32,170,399	
2013	Riddick	David Twohy	One Race Films	Universal Pictures	$98,337,295	
2014	Acid Girls ^{1}	Taylor Cohen	The Illusionarium		—	
2015	Winter Dragon ^{2}	James Seda	Red Eagle Entertainment	FXX	—	
2015	Club Life	Fabrizio Conte	2B Films	The Orchard	$219,229	
2016	Kickboxer: Vengeance	John Stockwell	Headmon Entertainment & Productions	RLJ Entertainment	$287,779	
2017	Under the Bed ^{2}	Daniel Myrick	Appian Way Productions/ Sobe Brooke Studios	Lifetime	—	
2017	Jumanji: Welcome to the Jungle	Jake Kasdan	Matt Tolmach Productions/ Seven Bucks Productions	Columbia Pictures	$962,544,585	
2018	Beirut	Brad Anderson	ShivHans Pictures	Bleecker Street	$7,509,436	
2019	Jumanji: The Next Level	Jake Kasdan	Matt Tolmach Productions/ Seven Bucks Productions/ The Detective Agency	Columbia Pictures	$801,693,929	
2020	Spell	Mark Tonderai	Mayhem Pictures/ MC8 Entertainment	Paramount Players	$500,104	
2025	The Hand That Rocks the Cradle	Michelle Garza Cervera	20th Century Studios/ Department M	Hulu/ Disney+	—	
TBA	Bendy and the Ink Machine	André Øvredal	Double Down Pictures	—	—	
TBD	Geronimo Stilton	David Soren	Atlantyca Entertainment			
Box office total:					$3,152,263,770	—

^{1} Direct-to-video release.
^{2} Released as a made-for-television film

=== Television shows ===
Year	Title	Creator	Co-production company(s)	Network(s)	Seasons	Ref.
2021	The Wheel of Time	Rafe Judkins	Iwot Pictures/ Long Weekend/ Little Island Productions/ Amazon Studios/ Sony Pictures Television	Amazon Prime Video	2	
Season total:					2	—
