= Nomura Babcock & Brown =

Japanese investment firm

Nomura Babcock & Brown Co. Ltd. 野村バブコックアンドブラウン株式会社
- Type: Public
- Industry: Finance
- Founded: March 3, 1986
- Headquarters: Tokyo, Japan
- Products: Financial services Investment banking
- Parent: Nomura Group
- Website: http://www.nbb.co.jp/nbb/english/

Nomura Babcock & Brown Co. Ltd. (NBB) is a Japanese investment firm and subsidiary of the Nomura Group. It was established in 1986 as a joint venture in 1986 between Nomura Securities Co., Ltd. (now known as Nomura Holdings, Inc.), Japan's largest security firm, and Babcock & Brown, an American investment and advisory firm. During the 1990s, the company became involved in a joint venture with The Walt Disney Company and Interscope Communications. It produced several films that were released between 1992 and 1995.

== History ==
Nomura Babcock & Brown specializes in international leasing of aircraft, ships and other large equipment. It works in collaboration with BBAM Aircraft Management LLC (BBAM) to create investment programs tailored to Japanese investors. Nomura Babcock & Brown was established on March 3, 1986. as a joint venture between Nomura Securities Co., Ltd. (now known as Nomura Holdings), Japan's largest security firm, and Babcock & Brown, an American investment and advisory firm.

In 1990, Nomura Babcock & Brown invested $250 million in a joint venture with The Walt Disney Company and Interscope Communications. The deal called for NBB to co-produce and finance films for Interscope and Disney for four years. NBB produced five films between 1992 and 1995, all of which were marketed and released under two of Disney's production banners, Touchstone Pictures and Hollywood Pictures.

== Filmography ==
Year	Film	Co-production company	Distributor
1992	The Hand That Rocks the Cradle	Interscope Communications	Hollywood Pictures
1992	The Gun in Betty Lou's Handbag	Interscope Communications	Touchstone Pictures
1994	The Air Up There	Interscope Communications / PolyGram Filmed Entertainment	Hollywood Pictures
1994	Terminal Velocity	Interscope Communications / PolyGram Filmed Entertainment	Hollywood Pictures
1995	Roommates	Interscope Communications / PolyGram Filmed Entertainment	Hollywood Pictures
