= Scott Kroopf =

American film producer

- Born: Scott Kroopf
- Occupation: Film producer
- Years active: 1987-present

Scott Kroopf is an American film producer. He studied at the University of California, Irvine with Bachelor of Arts degree in drama. He is a professor at USC School of Cinematic Arts.

== Filmography ==
All films, he was producer unless otherwise noted.

=== Film ===
Year	Film	Credit
1987	Outrageous Fortune	Co-producer
1989	Bill & Ted's Excellent Adventure	
1989	An Innocent Man	Executive producer
1990	A Gnome Named Gnorm	
1991	Class Action	
1991	Bill & Ted's Bogus Journey	
1991	Paradise	
1992	The Gun in Betty Lou's Handbag	
1992	Out on a Limb	Executive producer
1994	The Air Up There	Executive producer
1994	Terminal Velocity	
1995	Roommates	
1995	Jumanji	
1995	Mr. Holland's Opus	Executive producer
1996	Boys	Executive producer
1996	Kazaam	
1996	The Associate	Executive producer
1997	Gridlock'd	Executive producer
1998	The Proposition	
1998	Very Bad Things	Executive producer
1998	What Dreams May Come	Executive producer
1999	Runaway Bride	
1999	Teaching Mrs. Tingle	Executive producer
2000	Pitch Black	Executive producer
2002	They	
2003	How to Deal	Executive producer
2003	Le Divorce	Executive producer
2003	The Last Samurai	
2004	The Chronicles of Riddick	
2005	Son of the Mask	
2005	Zathura: A Space Adventure	
2007	Breach	
2007	Magicians	Executive producer
2007	The Hunting Party	
2008	One Missed Call	
2009	Ratko: The Dictator's Son	Executive producer
2011	Limitless	
2011	Arthur	Executive producer
2013	Walking with Dinosaurs	Co-producer
2020	Bill & Ted Face the Music	

Miscellaneous crew

Year	Film	Role
1995	The Tie That Binds	Senior production executive
2006	Basic Instinct 2	Executive: Intermedia

Thanks

Year	Film	Role
2001	Kissing Jessica Stein	Special thanks
2006	Waist Deep	Special thanks
2010	Shelter	The producers wish to thank

=== Television ===
Year	Title	Credit	Notes
1997	Dead Silence	Executive producer	Television film
1997	Snow White: A Tale of Terror	Executive producer	Television film
2000	Into Pitch Black	Co-executive producer	Television special
2000	The Three Stooges	Executive producer	Television film
2015−16	Limitless	Co-executive producer	
