= Hollywood Pictures =

Former American film label of Walt Disney Studios

Hollywood Pictures Company
- Trade name: Hollywood Pictures
- Type: Label
- Industry: Film
- Founded: February 1, 1989; 37 years ago
- Founder: Michael Eisner; Jeffrey Katzenberg
- Defunct: 2007; 19 years ago
- Fate: Folded into Walt Disney Pictures
- Headquarters: 500 South Buena Vista Street, Burbank, California, U.S.
- Products: Motion pictures
- Parent: Walt Disney Studios
- Divisions: Hollywood Pictures Home Entertainment

Hollywood Pictures Company was an American film production label of Walt Disney Studios, founded and owned by The Walt Disney Company. Established on February 1, 1989, by Disney CEO Michael Eisner and studio chief Jeffrey Katzenberg, Hollywood Pictures was founded to increase the film output of the Walt Disney Studios, and release films similar to those of Touchstone Pictures. These films, featuring more mature themes, were targeted at adult audiences unlike the family-oriented productions of the studio's flagship Walt Disney Pictures division. After years of hiatus, the label was quietly shut down in 2007 and is currently an in-name-only unit of Walt Disney Pictures. The studio's most commercially successful film was M. Night Shyamalan's The Sixth Sense, which grossed over $670 million worldwide upon its release in 1999.

== History ==
Hollywood Pictures Corporation was incorporated on March 30, 1984, and was activated on February 1, 1989. Ricardo Mestres was appointed the division's first president, moving from Disney's Touchstone Pictures. The division was formed to create opportunities for up-and-coming executives and to double Disney's feature-film output in order to fill the gap left by the contraction in the industry, which included the closure of MGM/UA's United Artists and financial problems at Lorimar-Telepictures and De Laurentiis Entertainment Group. With Touchstone aligned with Hollywood Pictures, the two Disney production divisions would share the same marketing and distribution staffs. Hollywood Pictures was expected to be producing 12 films a year by 1991 and to share funding from the Silver Screen Partners IV. The company's first release was Arachnophobia on July 18, 1990.

On October 23, 1990, The Walt Disney Company formed Touchwood Pacific Partners to supplant the Silver Screen Partnership series as their movie studios' primary funding source.

After the collapse of their then-recently renewed deal at Paramount Pictures, Don Simpson and Jerry Bruckheimer moved their production company to Hollywood Pictures on January 18, 1991.

The division issued primarily inexpensive comedies for the first six years with a few box office flops, amongst them Holy Matrimony, Aspen Extreme, Super Mario Bros., Swing Kids, Blame It on the Bellboy, Born Yesterday and Guilty as Sin. The division only had one box office success, The Hand That Rocks the Cradle, and one critical success, The Joy Luck Club, which did not outweigh the general anemic box office record of the division. On April 26, 1994, Mestres was forced to resign after the lackluster performance of the division. Mestres moved to long term production deal with the studio.

On June 27, 1994, Michael Lynton was appointed as new division president after moving from the Disney Publishing Group, where he was senior vice president and oversaw domestic publishing units including Hyperion Books. Mestres left Lynton a few potential hits: Robert Redford's Quiz Show, the Sarah Jessica Parker-Antonio Banderas comedy Miami Rhapsody, and Dangerous Minds, starring Michelle Pfeiffer. In 1997, Lynton left for a position at Penguin Group. When Lynton left, it was briefly transferred to a releasing-only entity, making pictures by third-parties, as well as Caravan Pictures, and Cinergi, and its development slate was transferred to Touchstone Pictures, but David Vogel, who was president of Walt Disney Pictures took on the studio by producing films again. In 1998, the three units were transferred to the Buena Vista Motion Picture Group, and its development slate of projects by Hollywood Pictures, such as Bicentennial Man, and The Hitchhiker's Guide to the Galaxy was transferred to Touchstone. By 2001, Hollywood Pictures had produced 80 films, but its operation had been phased out and its management was merged with that of the flagship Walt Disney Pictures studio.

After being dormant for five years, the brand was reactivated for low-budget genre films. Films released by the repurposed Hollywood Pictures were two horror films: Stay Alive (released on March 24, 2006), and Primeval (released on January 12, 2007), and one thriller, The Invisible (released on April 27, 2007). After the latter release, Disney stopped producing and distributing under the label as it announced a focus on the company's core brands of Disney, Touchstone, ABC, ESPN, and Pixar.

== Filmography ==
=== 1990s ===
US Release date	Title	Notes
July 18, 1990	Arachnophobia	Co-production with Amblin Entertainment; first Hollywood Pictures release
August 17, 1990	Taking Care of Business	Co-production with Silver Screen Partners IV
February 1, 1991	Run	Co-production with Silver Screen Partners IV
April 5, 1991	The Marrying Man	Co-production with Silver Screen Partners IV
May 3, 1991	One Good Cop	Co-production with Silver Screen Partners IV
July 26, 1991	V.I. Warshawski	Co-production with Silver Screen Partners IV
January 10, 1992	The Hand That Rocks the Cradle	Co-production with Interscope Communications and Nomura Babcock & Brown
February 7, 1992	Medicine Man (Note: Disney has since reclaimed international rights to this film, as a result of acquiring Cinergi Pictures' film library in 1997)	North and South American distribution only; produced by Cinergi Pictures
March 6, 1992	Blame It on the Bellboy	Co-production with Silver Screen Partners IV
April 3, 1992	Straight Talk	Co-production with Touchwood Pacific Partners I
April 24, 1992	Passed Away	Co-production with Touchwood Pacific Partners I
May 22, 1992	Encino Man	Co-production with Touchwood Pacific Partners I
July 17, 1992	A Stranger Among Us	North American distribution only; co-production with Touchwood Pacific Partners I, Propaganda Films and Sandollar Productions
September 18, 1992	Sarafina! (Note: Owned by Miramax, with distribution currently handled by Paramount Pictures)	American distribution with Miramax Films only; produced by Distant Horizon, Vanguard Films and BBC
October 16, 1992	Consenting Adults	Co-production with Touchwood Pacific Partners I
December 4, 1992	The Distinguished Gentleman	Co-production with Touchwood Pacific Partners I
January 22, 1993	Aspen Extreme	Co-production with Touchwood Pacific Partners I
March 5, 1993	Swing Kids	Co-production with Touchwood Pacific Partners I
March 26, 1993	Born Yesterday	Co-production with Touchwood Pacific Partners I
April 16, 1993	Blood In Blood Out	Co-production with Touchwood Pacific Partners I
May 28, 1993	Super Mario Bros.	North and South American distribution only; produced by Lightmotive, Allied Filmmakers and Cinergi Productions
June 4, 1993	Guilty as Sin	—
July 2, 1993	Son in Law	—
August 27, 1993	Father Hood	—
September 8, 1993	The Joy Luck Club	Inducted into the National Film Registry in 2020
September 10, 1993	Money for Nothing	—
December 25, 1993	Tombstone	North and South American distribution only; produced by Cinergi Pictures
January 7, 1994	The Air Up There	Co-production with Interscope Communications, PolyGram Filmed Entertainment, Nomura Babcock & Brown and Longview Entertainment
March 4, 1994	Angie	Co-production with Caravan Pictures
April 8, 1994	Holy Matrimony	North American distribution only; co-production with Interscope Communications and PolyGram Filmed Entertainment
August 12, 1994	In the Army Now	—
August 19, 1994	Color of Night	North and South American distribution only; produced by Cinergi Pictures
August 26, 1994	Camp Nowhere	—
September 14, 1994	Quiz Show	Co-production with Wildwood Enterprises and Baltimore Pictures
September 23, 1994	Terminal Velocity	Co-production with Interscope Communications, PolyGram Filmed Entertainment and Nomura Babcock & Brown
October 21, 1994	The Puppet Masters	—
November 11, 1994	The Santa Clause	Co-production with Walt Disney Pictures and Outlaw Productions
November 23, 1994	A Low Down Dirty Shame	Co-production with Caravan Pictures
January 6, 1995	Houseguest	Co-production with Caravan Pictures
January 27, 1995	Miami Rhapsody	Co-production with Cantaloupe Production
March 3, 1995	Roommates	Co-production with Interscope Communications, PolyGram Filmed Entertainment and Nomura Babcock & Brown
March 31, 1995	Funny Bones	—
April 21, 1995	While You Were Sleeping	Co-production with Caravan Pictures
April 28, 1995	A Pyromaniac's Love Story	—
May 12, 1995	Crimson Tide	Co-production with Don Simpson/Jerry Bruckheimer Films
June 30, 1995	Judge Dredd	North and South American distribution only; produced by Cinergi Pictures
August 11, 1995	Dangerous Minds	Co-production with Don Simpson/Jerry Bruckheimer Films and Via Rosa Productions
September 8, 1995	The Tie That Binds	North American distribution only; co-production with Interscope Communications and PolyGram Filmed Entertainment
September 8, 1995	Unstrung Heroes	—
October 4, 1995	Dead Presidents	Co-production with Caravan Pictures and Underworld Entertainment
October 13, 1995	The Scarlet Letter	North and South American distribution only; produced by Cinergi Pictures, Lightmotive, Allied Stars and Moving Pictures
October 27, 1995	Powder	Co-production with Caravan Pictures
December 22, 1995	Nixon	Distribution in North and South America, Germany, Austria, Switzerland, China and Japan only; produced by Cinergi Pictures and Illusion Entertainment Group
December 29, 1995	Mr. Holland's Opus	North American distribution only; co-production with Interscope Communications, PolyGram Filmed Entertainment and The Charlie Mopic Company
February 2, 1996	White Squall (Note: Distribution rights co-owned by Resurgence Media Group)	North American distribution only; produced by Largo Entertainment and Scott Free Productions
February 23, 1996	Before and After	Co-production with Caravan Pictures
April 19, 1996	Celtic Pride	Co-production with Caravan Pictures
May 24, 1996	Spy Hard	—
May 31, 1996	Eddie	North American distribution only; co-production with PolyGram Filmed Entertainment and Island Pictures
June 7, 1996	The Rock	Co-production with Don Simpson/Jerry Bruckheimer Films
August 9, 1996	Jack	Co-production with American Zoetrope and Great Oaks Entertainment
September 13, 1996	The Rich Man's Wife	Co-production with Caravan Pictures
October 25, 1996	The Associate	North American distribution only; co-production with Interscope Communications and PolyGram Filmed Entertainment
December 25, 1996	Evita	North and Latin American and Spanish distribution only; produced by Cinergi Pictures, RSO Films and Dirty Hands Productions
January 24, 1997	Prefontaine	—
January 31, 1997	Shadow Conspiracy	North and South American distribution only; produced by Cinergi Pictures
April 11, 1997	Grosse Pointe Blank	Co-production with Caravan Pictures, Roger Birnbaum Productions and New Crime Productions
May 30, 1997	Gone Fishin'	Co-production with Caravan Pictures
August 22, 1997	G.I. Jane	Distribution in North and Latin America, France, Germany, Austria, Switzerland, Spain, the Benelux, Australia, New Zealand and Taiwan only; co-production with Caravan Pictures, Scott Free Productions, Largo Entertainment, Roger Birnbaum Productions and Moving Pictures
October 17, 1997	Washington Square	North American, U.K. and Irish distribution only; co-production with Caravan Pictures, Roger Birnbaum Productions and Alchemy Filmworks
December 25, 1997	An American Werewolf in Paris	North American distribution only; produced by Cometstone Pictures
January 30, 1998	Deep Rising	North and Hispanic American and French distribution only; co-production with Laurence Mark Productions and Cinergi Pictures (uncredited)
February 27, 1998	An Alan Smithee Film: Burn Hollywood Burn	North and Latin American distribution only; produced by Cinergi Pictures
September 4, 1998	Firelight	Distribution in North America, the U.K., Ireland, Germany, Austria, Italy and Spain only; co-distributed by Miramax Films in North America; co-production with Carnival Films and Wind Dancer Productions
September 11, 1998	Simon Birch	Co-production with Caravan Pictures
August 6, 1999	The Sixth Sense	Distribution outside Germany, Austria, the Nordics, Portugal, Angola, Mozambique, South Africa, Greece, Cyprus, Poland, Hungary, Israel, Japan, Benelux pay television, free television in Italy, San Marino, Vatican City and Monte Carlo, television in France, Spain, French-speaking Belgium, Andorra, Gibraltar, French-speaking Mauritius, Romandy, French-speaking Monaco and French-speaking Africa, and international airlines and ships only; produced by Spyglass Entertainment and The Kennedy/Marshall Company
September 17, 1999	Breakfast of Champions (Note: Owned by Films We Like, with U.S. distribution rights licensed to Shout! Studios)	North American distribution only; produced by Flying Heart Films
October 1, 1999	Mystery, Alaska	—

=== 2000s ===
US Release date	Title	Notes
February 4, 2000	Gun Shy	Distribution only; produced by Fortis Films; international rights outside Latin America, Australia, New Zealand and Japan licensed to Buena Vista Film Sales
September 15, 2000	Duets	Distribution only; produced by Seven Arts Pictures and Beacon Pictures; international rights outside Hispanic America, Australia, New Zealand, South Africa and Spain licensed to Buena Vista Film Sales
April 6, 2001	Just Visiting	North American distribution only; produced by Gaumont
March 24, 2006	Stay Alive	North American distribution only; produced by Spyglass Entertainment, Endgame Entertainment, Wonderland Sound and Vision and Stay Alive Productions
January 12, 2007	Primeval	Co-production with Pariah Entertainment
April 27, 2007	The Invisible	Distribution outside Portugal, Angola, Mozambique, Greece, Cyprus, Poland, Hungary, the CIS, Israel, Australia and New Zealand only; produced by Spyglass Entertainment; final Hollywood Pictures release

== See also ==
- List of Walt Disney Pictures films
- List of Touchstone Pictures films
