= Interscope Communications =

Motion picture production company

Interscope Communications, LLC.
- Logo used from 1982 to 2000
- Industry: Film
- Founded: 1979; 47 years ago
- Defunct: April 7, 1999; 27 years ago
- Fate: Sold to USA Networks and merged with Gramercy Pictures and October Films to form USA Films; Assets acquired by Radar Pictures
- Successor: Focus Features; Radar Pictures
- Headquarters: United States
- Key people: Ted Field; Robert W. Cort; Scott Kroopf
- Parent: PolyGram Filmed Entertainment (1994–1998); Universal Studios (1998–1999); USA Networks (1999)
- Subsidiaries: Interscope Records (1990–1996)

Interscope Communications, LLC. (also known as Interscope Pictures) was an American motion picture production company founded in 1979 by Ted Field. It soon became a division of PolyGram Filmed Entertainment.

In 1999, after Seagram merged PolyGram into Universal Pictures, Interscope Communications was sold to USA Networks and merged into USA Films. In 2000, the company was morphed into Radar Pictures.

== History ==
Interscope Communications (the studio shared its name for a former racing team, "Interscope Racing") was founded in 1979 by media mogul Ted Field, who aimed to create films with mass appeal. Field then hired Peter Samuelson, who was partner with Field for four years as head of film production. Field acted as a producer or executive producer on a number of films in Interscope's filmography. The company's first film, Revenge of the Nerds, was released in 1984 and was a box office success. That same year, Robert W. Cort, a former executive of 20th Century Fox and Columbia Pictures, joined Interscope and became the president of the company. Cort also co-produced a number of films.

On November 13, 1984, the company received an agreement with The Walt Disney Studios for a two-year term, to become the company's first independent supplier within the studio.

On December 10, 1986, Interscope Communications inked a three-picture domestic feature pact with United Artists Pictures, whereas production would be jointly financed by UA and Interscope, and that Interaccess Film Distribution and Vestron Inc. would participate in Interscope's share of financing, and domestic videocassette rights to Interscope's features going to Vestron Video, and foreign theatrical, television and home video distribution of Interscope's films going to Interaccess Film Distribution.

On May 20, 1987, Interscope Communications rises into the rank as a film supplier, in order to set films from different major film studios, mostly MPAA members, which included five of the films that were donated by Interscope to the major motion picture studios, such as Touchstone Pictures, Tri-Star Pictures, Warner Bros., Orion Pictures, 20th Century Fox and De Laurentiis Entertainment Group, as well as his involvement with a $1 million in-house development kitty.

In early July 1987, Interscope Communications decided to accelerate its television production phase from four productions from its first four years of existence to a slate of 13 new projects for the next eighteen months, and which include two movies-of-the week, a miniseries and a conventional series for NBC, and Patricia Clifford runs the company's television operations for Interscope's television division, acknowledged a markedly pronounced greater receptivity than in previous years to telefilms dealing with black experience in the United States, and offered a series of failed pilots and television movies on the air.

In 1990, Nomura Babcock & Brown (NBB) invested $250 million in a joint venture with The Walt Disney Company and Interscope Communications. The deal called for NBB to co-produce and finance films for Interscope and Disney for four years. The joint venture produced five films between 1992 and 1995, all of which were marketed and released under two of Disney's production banners, Touchstone Pictures and Hollywood Pictures. The most successful film co-produced by Interscope and NBB was The Hand That Rocks the Cradle (1992), while other films produced by the joint venture were critical and commercial failures.

Also that year, it purchased Marble Arch Productions from ITC, and decided that ITC Entertainment would co-finance the projects for U.S. and foreign distribution.

=== PolyGram ===
In 1992, PolyGram bought a controlling interest in Interscope Communications' film unit. Production and marketing budgets were to be paid by PolyGram. In 1993, Adam Leipzig joined the company as a production executive. Robert W. Cort, president of Interscope, left the company at the end of 1995 believing that PolyGram "took on much more of a corporate environment than it had before and that consequently his role had become more like an executive's than a producer's." Field purchased Cort's 12% stake in the corporation.

Beginning in 1996, Interscope began using PFE's PolyGram Filmed Entertainment Distribution for distribution. In 1997, Chris Van Allsburg, the author of Jumanji had signed a deal with the studio to produce films. Also that year, BallPark Productions, a company owned by Michael Schiffer, set up a deal with the studio.

=== USA Films merger and shut down ===
In 1998, after PolyGram was bought by Universal Studios, Interscope's film unit was retained as a subsidiary of Universal until 1999, when it was sold off to Barry Diller's USA Networks, which later merged Interscope Communications with October Films and Gramercy Pictures to become USA Films. In 2000, members of the company formed its successor Radar Pictures, that took the existing Interscope library in the company's development slate, thus rendering Interscope as inactive. The remaining films that were intended to be produced under the Interscope Communications name, including The Last Samurai, Le Divorce, The Heartbreak Kid, and the scrapped Peter Berg film Truck 44 were drafted to Radar Pictures.

Interscope Records, however, still exists as part of the Interscope Geffen A&M faction of Universal Music Group (whose predecessor, MCA, purchased Atlantic's stake in the label in 1995).

== Filmography ==
Interscope Communications has produced 68 films. Of the 68 films produced, only 20 are direct-to-video or made-for-television productions. Currently, all of the films that Interscope produced for Orion Pictures, and De Laurentiis Entertainment Group between 1989 and 1991, as well as PolyGram Filmed Entertainment and Gramercy Pictures before March 31, 1996, are owned by Metro-Goldwyn-Mayer (MGM), which acquired the studios in separate transactions. Films produced for PolyGram or Gramercy after April 1, 1996, are now owned by Universal Studios or its division Focus Features. Note that in all cases the distributor or distributors are also co-producers. The box office column reflects the worldwide gross for the theatrical release of the films in United States dollars.

Year	Title	Director	Co-production company(s)	Distributor(s)	Box office	Ref.
1984	Revenge of the Nerds	Jeff Kanew	SLM Production Group	20th Century Fox	$40,874,452	
1985	Turk 182	Bob Clark	SLM Production Group	20th Century Fox	$3,594,997	
1985	American Geisha ^{2}	Lee Phillips	Stonehenge Productions	CBS	—	
1987	Critical Condition	Michael Apted		Paramount Pictures	$20,240,752	
1987	Outrageous Fortune	Arthur Hiller	Silver Screen Partners II	Touchstone Pictures	$52,864,741	
1987	Stillwatch ^{2}	Rod Holcomb	Zev Braun Productions	CBS	—	
1987	Murder Ordained ^{2}	Mike Robe	Zev Braun Productions	CBS	—	
1987	Revenge of the Nerds II: Nerds in Paradise	Joe Roth	Amercent Films/ American Entertainment Partners, L.P.	20th Century Fox	$30,063,289	
1987	Three Men and a Baby	Leonard Nimoy	Silver Screen Partners III	Touchstone Pictures	$167,780,960	
1987	The Father Clements Story ^{2}	Edwin Sherin	Zev Braun Productions	NBC	—	
1988	The Seventh Sign	Carl Schultz	ML Delphi Premier Productions	TriStar Pictures	$18,875,011	
1988	Cocktail	Roger Donaldson	Silver Screen Partners III	Touchstone Pictures	$171,504,781	
1988	Crossing the Mob ^{2}	Steven Hilliard Stern	Bateman Company	NBC	—	
1989	Bill & Ted's Excellent Adventure	Stephen Herek	Nelson Entertainment/ Soisson-Murphey Productions/ DEG	Orion Pictures	$40,485,039	
1989	Collision Course ^{1}	Lewis Teague		DEG	—	
1989	Renegades	Jack Sholder	Morgan Creek Productions	Universal Pictures	$9,015,164	
1989	Blind Fury	Phillip Noyce		TriStar Pictures	$2,692,037	
1989	My Boyfriend's Back ^{2}	Paul Schneider		NBC	—	
1989	An Innocent Man	Peter Yates	Silver Screen Partners III	Touchstone Pictures	$20,047,604	
1989	A Mother's Courage: The Mary Thomas Story ^{2}	John Patterson	Walt Disney Television	NBC	—	
1989	Everybody's Baby: The Rescue of Jessica McClure ^{2}	Mel Damski	Dick Berg-Stonehenge Productions/ Campbell's	ABC	—	
1990	The First Power	Robert Resnikoff	Nelson Entertainment	Orion Pictures	$22,424,195	
1990	Bird on a Wire	John Badham	The Badham-Cohen Group	Universal Pictures	$138,697,012	
1990	A Gnome Named Gnorm ^{1}	Stan Winston	Lightning Pictures	Vestron Pictures	—	
1990	Arachnophobia	Frank Marshall	Amblin Entertainment	Hollywood Pictures	$53,208,180	
1990	The Secret Life of Archie's Wife ^{2}	James Frawley	Consolidated Entertainment	CBS	—	
1990	Three Men and a Little Lady	Emile Ardolino	Silver Screen Partners IV	Touchstone Pictures	$71,609,321	
1990	Eve of Destruction	Duncan Gibbins	Nelson Entertainment	Orion Pictures	$5,451,119	
1991	The Last to Go ^{2}	John Erman	ITC Entertainment Group	ABC	—	
1991	Aftermath ^{2}	Glenn Jordan	ITC Entertainment Group	CBS	—	
1991	Class Action	Michael Apted		20th Century Fox	$28,277,918	
1991	Shoot First: A Cop's Vengeance ^{2}	Mel Damski	Harvey Kahn Productions/ ITC Entertainment Group	NBC	—	
1991	Bill & Ted's Bogus Journey	Peter Hewitt	Nelson Entertainment	Orion Pictures	$38,037,513	
1991	Paradise	Mary Agnes Donahue	Touchwood Pacific Partners I	Touchstone Pictures	$18,634,643	
1992	The Hand That Rocks the Cradle	Curtis Hanson	Nomura Babcock & Brown	Hollywood Pictures	$88,036,683	
1992	The Cutting Edge	Paul Michael Glaser		Metro-Goldwyn-Mayer	$25,105,517	
1992	FernGully: The Last Rainforest	Bill Kroyer	FAI Films/ Kroyer Films/ Youngheart Productions	20th Century Fox	$32,710,894	
1992	The Gun in Betty Lou's Handbag	Allan Moyle	Nomura Babcock & Brown	Touchstone Pictures	$3,721,911	
1992	Out on a Limb	Francis Veber		Universal Pictures	$1,659,542	
1992	Jersey Girl	David Burton Morris	Electric Pictures	Triumph Releasing Corporation	—	
1993	Foreign Affairs ^{2}	Jim O'Brien		TNT	—	
1994	The Air Up There	Paul Michael Glaser	PolyGram Filmed Entertainment/ Nomura Babcock & Brown	Hollywood Pictures	$21,011,318	
1994	Holy Matrimony	Leonard Nimoy	PolyGram Filmed Entertainment	Hollywood Pictures	$713,234	
1994	Terminal Velocity	Deran Sarafian	PolyGram Filmed Entertainment/ Nomura Babcock & Brown	Hollywood Pictures	$16,487,349	
1994	A Part of the Family ^{2}	David Madden		PolyGram Filmed Entertainment	—	
1995	Roommates	Peter Yates	PolyGram Filmed Entertainment/ Nomura Babcock & Brown	Hollywood Pictures	$12,096,881	
1995	Separate Lives	David Madden		Trimark Pictures	$961,147	
1995	Body Language ^{2}	Eric Harlacher		HBO	—	
1995	Operation Dumbo Drop	Simon Wincer	PolyGram Filmed Entertainment	Walt Disney Pictures	$24,670,346	
1995	The Tie That Binds	Wesley Strick	PolyGram Filmed Entertainment	Hollywood Pictures	$5,830,454	
1995	Two Much	Fernando Trueba	PolyGram Filmed Entertainment/ Sogetel	Touchstone Pictures	$1,141,556	
1995	Jumanji	Joe Johnston		TriStar Pictures	$262,322,000	
1995	Mr. Holland's Opus	Stephen Herek	PolyGram Filmed Entertainment	Hollywood Pictures	$106,269,971	
1996	Boys	Stacy Cochran	PolyGram Filmed Entertainment	Touchstone Pictures	$516,349	
1996	Kazaam	Paul Michael Glaser	PolyGram Filmed Entertainment	Touchstone Pictures	$18,937,262	
1996	The Associate	Donald Petrie	PolyGram Filmed Entertainment	Hollywood Pictures	$12,844,057	
1997	Dead Silence ^{2}	Daniel Petrie, Jr.	Alliance Communications	HBO Pictures	—	
1997	Gridlock'd	Vondie Curtis-Hall	PolyGram Filmed Entertainment	Gramercy Pictures	$5,571,205	
1997	Snow White: A Tale of Terror ^{2}	Michael Cohn	PolyGram Filmed Entertainment	Gramercy Pictures	—	
1998	The Proposition	Leslie Linka Glatter		PolyGram Filmed Entertainment	$147,773	
1998	Very Bad Things	Peter Berg	Initial Entertainment Group/ Ballpark Productions	PolyGram Filmed Entertainment	$9,898,412	
1998	What Dreams May Come	Vincent Ward		PolyGram Filmed Entertainment	$55,382,927	
1999	Runaway Bride	Garry Marshall	Lakeshore Entertainment	Paramount Pictures/ Touchstone Pictures	$309,457,509	
1999	Teaching Mrs. Tingle	Kevin Williamson	Konrad Pictures	Dimension Films	$8,951,935	
2000	Pitch Black	David Twohy	PolyGram Filmed Entertainment	Gramercy Pictures/ USA Films	$53,187,659	
2000	The Three Stooges ^{2}	Glenn Jordan	Icon Entertainment International	Columbia TriStar Television	—	
Box office total:					$2,042,925,021	—

^{1} Direct-to-video release.
^{2} Released as a made-for-television film
