= PolyGram Filmed Entertainment =

British-American film studio (1975–1999)

- PolyGram Filmed Entertainment logo, used from 1997 until 1999
- Formerly: Filmworks (1975–1976); Casablanca Record & Filmworks (1976–1980); PolyGram Pictures (1980–1983); PolyGram Movies (1987–1990); PolyGram Films (1990–1991, 1997–1998)
- Type: Subsidiary
- Predecessor: Casablanca Records & Filmworks
- Founded: 1975; 51 years ago (original); February 1987; 39 years ago (relaunch)
- Founder: Peter Guber (original); Michael Kuhn (relaunch); Malcolm Ritchie (relaunch)
- Defunct: 1983; 43 years ago (original); 1999; 27 years ago (relaunch)
- Fate: Acquired by Seagram and folded into Universal Pictures
- Successors: Studio: Universal Pictures; PolyGram Entertainment; Library: Amazon MGM Studios (pre-April 1996 films with exceptions); Universal Pictures (post-March 1996 films with exceptions and some pre-April 1996 films); ITV Studios (ITC Entertainment library with exceptions)
- Headquarters: Beverly Hills, California, United States; London, United Kingdom
- Number of locations: 2
- Owners: PolyGram (50%, 1977–1980) Siemens (1980–1988) Philips (1980–1998) Seagram (1998–1999)
- Parent: PolyGram (1980–1998) Universal Pictures (1998–1999)
- Divisions: PolyGram Film Distribution; PolyGram Television; PolyGram Video; PolyGram Visual Programming
- Subsidiaries: Gramercy Pictures; Working Title Films; Propaganda Films; Interscope Communications; ITC Entertainment

PolyGram Filmed Entertainment (formerly known as Filmworks, Casablanca Record & Filmworks, PolyGram Films and PolyGram Pictures or simply PFE) was a British-American film production company founded in 1975 as an American film studio, which became a European competitor to Hollywood within two decades, but was eventually sold to Seagram in 1998 and was folded into Universal Pictures in 1999. Among its most successful and well known films were The Deep (1977), Midnight Express (1978), An American Werewolf in London (1981), Flashdance (1983), Batman (1989), Candyman (1992), Four Weddings and a Funeral (1994), The Usual Suspects (1995), Dead Man Walking (1995), Fargo (1996), Trainspotting (1996), The Game (1997), The Big Lebowski (1998), Notting Hill (1999), and Pitch Black (2000).

== Overview ==
Evolution of Comcast
- 1909: Independent Moving Pictures was founded by Carl Laemmle as the predecessor to Universal
- 1912: Universal Studios Hollywood was founded after Independent Moving merged with several smaller film studios
- 1915: Universal City, California, was established as the entertainment district for the Universal Studios Lot.
- 1924: MCA Inc. was founded by Jules Stein as a talent agency to book musicians
- 1926: RCA Corporation launched the NBC Radio Network, and by 1939, NBC began broadcasting on television.
- 1934: Decca Records America was established and would later grow to become Universal Music Group
- 1946: William Goetz and Leo Spitz began managing Universal Pictures, after merging International Pictures
- 1952: Decca Records America acquired a controlling stake in Universal Pictures
- 1958: MCA acquired the Universal Studios film lot and later purchased Decca Records America, and Universal Pictures in 1962
- 1963: Comcast was founded as American Cable Systems by Ralph J. Roberts
- 1973: Decca Records America is retired as a brand and renamed to MCA Records
- 1986: General Electric acquired RCA Corp and dissolved the company while retaining ownership of NBC
- 1990: Panasonic acquired a Controlling interest in MCA, but sold it to Seagram within five years after growing costs
- 1998: MCA Records acquired Polygram N.V. from Philips and was renamed to Universal Music Group
- 2000: Seagram Entertainment was sold to Vivendi and merged with StudioCanal to become Vivendi Universal
- 2002: NBC acquired Telemundo while Comcast acquired AT&T Broadband
- 2004: Vivendi Universal was consolidated with General Electric's wholly owned NBC to form NBCUniversal, while Universal Music Group was separated
- 2013: Comcast closed its acquisition of NBCUniversal from General Electric
- 2018: Sky Group was acquired from 21st Century Fox after a bidding war
- 2020: Peacock was launched
- 2026: Majority of NBCU's cable networks were spun off into another company named Versant, while Comcast later announced it would spin-off NBCUniversal and Sky into a separate company

In 1975, Peter Guber formed its own production company FilmWorks, then in 1976, it became Casablanca Record & FilmWorks after a merger with Casablanca Records, which PolyGram got a 50% by 1977, and by 1980, PolyGram took the other 50% stake in the company and renamed the film unit as PolyGram Pictures.

During the late 1980s and early 1990s, PolyGram continued to invest in a diversified film unit with the purchases of individual production companies. In 1995, PolyGram purchased ITC Entertainment for $156 million.

In May 1998, PolyGram was sold to Seagram, which, at the time, owned both Universal Pictures and Universal Music Group (UMG), for $10 billion. Seagram however, was only interested in PolyGram's music division and immediately sold off some of PolyGram's film and television assets: The pre-March 1996 PFE library (including the Epic library) was sold to MGM for $250 million, the ITC Entertainment library was sold to Carlton Communications for £91 million, and PolyGram's US distribution operation was sold to USA Network.

After many of its assets were sold, the remains of PolyGram's film division were folded into Universal Pictures. When the newly formed entertainment division of Seagram faced financial difficulties, it was sold to Vivendi, and MCA became known as Universal Studios, as Seagram ceased to exist.

Vivendi remained the majority owner of the UMG until 2021, when it sold most of its stake. MGM owns the rights to most of the pre-April 1996 library, and the remaining post-March 1996 film and television library is owned by NBCUniversal.

On February 11, 2017, Universal Music Group established a film and television division and named it PolyGram Entertainment, thus fully resurrecting the "PolyGram" name in the process.

== History ==
=== FilmWorks, Casablanca Record & FilmWorks and PolyGram Pictures ===
In 1975, Peter Guber quit Columbia Pictures to start out FilmWorks with a producing deal. A year later, during the production of The Deep, it was merged with Casablanca Records to form Casablanca Record & FilmWorks. The company would enjoy success with The Deep and Midnight Express. The music company PolyGram (owned by Dutch-based Philips and Germany's Siemens) bought out its share of Casablanca Record & FilmWorks in 1977. Two years later, in 1979, Casablanca Record & Filmworks left Columbia Pictures to join Universal Pictures, and gave Casablanca Record & Filmworks creative control over the pictures. A year later, PolyGram took on its stake of the company and it was renamed to PolyGram Pictures in 1980. PolyGram reserved the finances and Guber would run as CEO. Guber would form a partnership with Barbra Streisand's hairdresser Jon Peters, who co-produced his client's A Star Is Born remake. Peters would produce PolyGram's films, and eventually become a stockholder with Guber. He had intended to work with Boardwalk Records, but he was forced to join PolyGram Pictures instead.

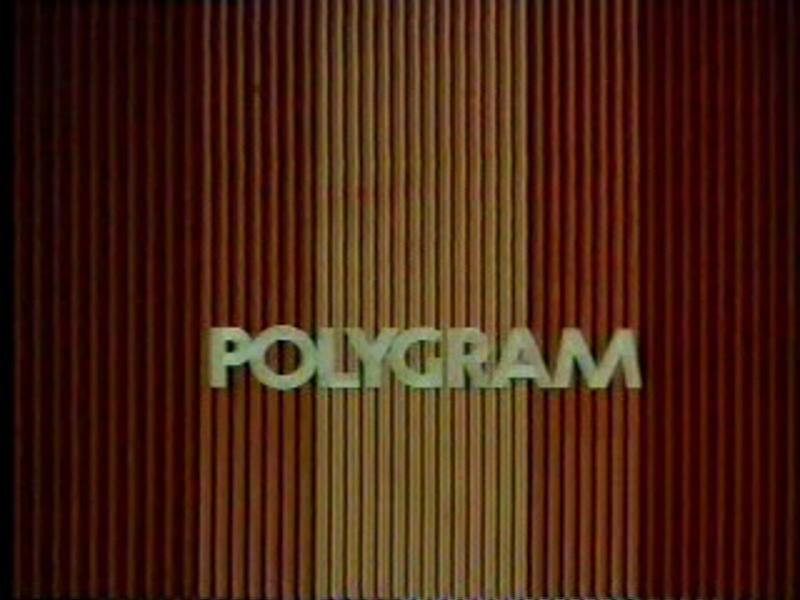
PolyGram Pictures logo, used in 1981.

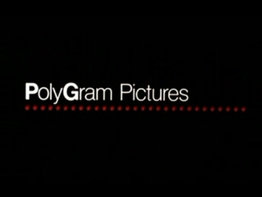
Polygram Pictures logo, used from 1981 to 1982.

The first film under the Universal/PolyGram alliance was King of the Mountain (1981), which was a box-office flop. More money-losers followed. Ancillary markets such as home video and pay television were not yet established, and broadcast television networks were paying less for licenses to films. PolyGram's European investors were not happy; they had lost about $80 million on its film division. Not long after, Siemens parted with Philips. Guber and Peters left PolyGram Pictures in 1982, taking their plans for a new Batman movie with them, along with a few other projects. The duo eventually found a home at Warner Bros. A part of their exit proceedings, PolyGram would still own 7.5% of profits from some of its projects, including the 1989 Batman film. Also in 1980, PolyGram launched a syndicated television division, PolyGram Television, to be headed by former Columbia Pictures Television syndication executive Norman Horowitz, both the film and television units eventually closed down by 1983 after a string of first-run syndication strip flops.

=== PolyGram Filmed Entertainment ===
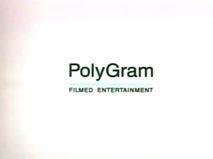
Logo used from 1992 to 1999.

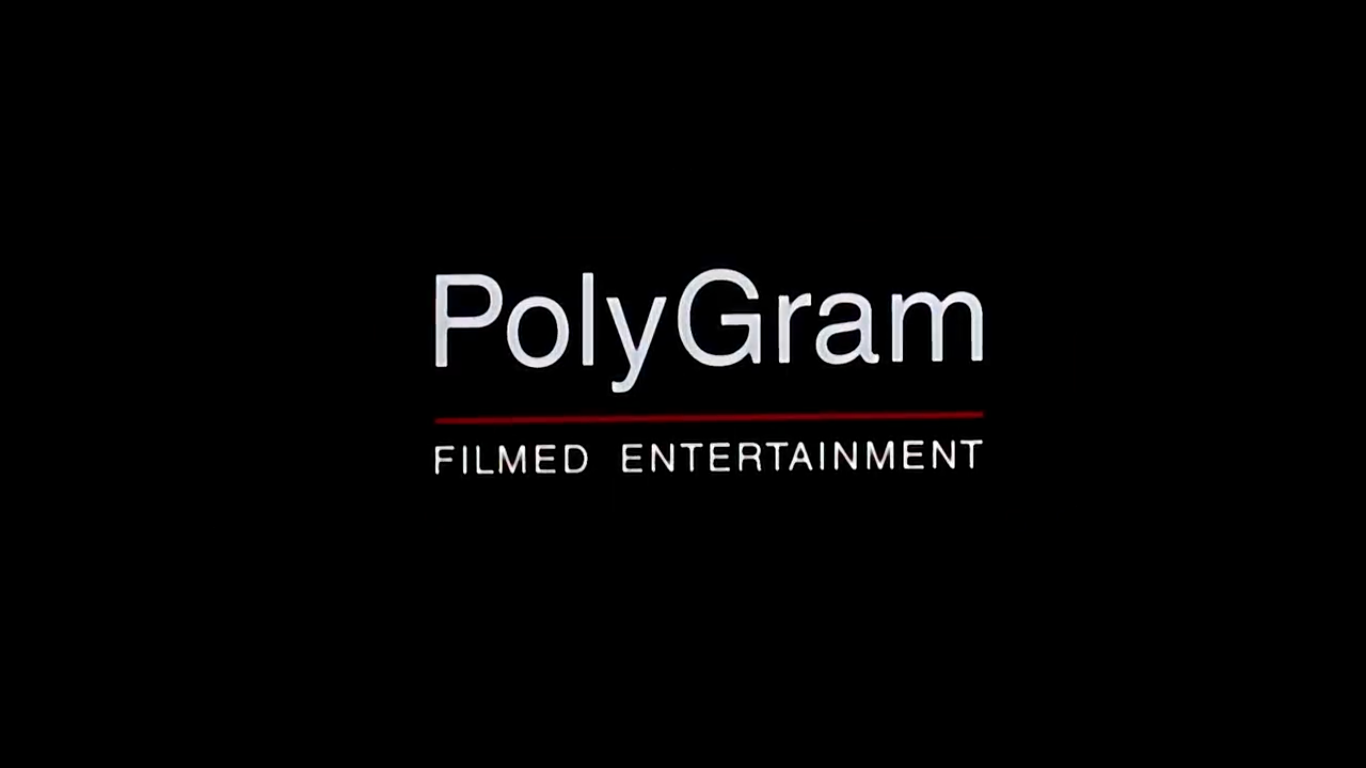
PolyGram Film Distribution logo, used in 1992.

PolyGram Filmed Entertainment logo, used from 1992 to 1998.

In the early 1980s, PolyGram Video was launched. PolyGram Video, headed by Michael Kuhn and David Hockman, was created to distribute concert films and feature films acquired from third-parties, as well as long-form music videos and stand-up comedy videos from the likes of Roy Chubby Brown, Jethro and Bernard Manning (though they would later add Jim Davidson, Billy Connolly and Lee Evans to their stand-up comedy video lineup when they purchased Vision Video Ltd in 1993). In 1986, a joint venture with Heron Communications, Channel 5 Video, began operation. Channel 5 Video later began to obtain the rights to titles from Heron's U.S. children's arm, Hi-Tops Video. Kuhn and Hockman were able to parlay PolyGram Video's success into financing feature films. The first film produced by PolyGram's new film division was P.I. Private Investigations in 1987. During the late 1980s and early 1990s, PolyGram continued to invest in a diversified film unit with the purchases of individual production companies. In 1989, PolyGram launched Manifesto Film Sales to handle the licensing of films outside North America. In 1991, PolyGram's Michael Kuhn became the head of PolyGram Filmed Entertainment, with US$200 million pumped in with the intention of developing a European film studio that could produce and distribute films internationally on a scale to match the major Hollywood studios.

Following the style of its music business, the company produced films through a number of creatively semi-autonomous 'labels', such as Working Title Films in the United Kingdom and Propaganda Films and Interscope Communications in the United States; it also built up its own network of distribution companies.

Film production within PolyGram differed from traditional Hollywood studios, in that power to make ('green light') a film was not centralised in the hands of a small number of executives, but instead was decided by negotiations between producers, management and marketing. Kuhn claimed that "movies sort of green lit themselves."

In 1993, PolyGram purchased Vision Video Ltd (which was previously the video arm of Virgin Group) from General Electric Capital for $5.6 million. Vision Video Ltd would be placed within PolyGram Video as their budget label.

PolyGram Video took over the distribution of Manga Entertainment's titles in Australia and New Zealand in late 1996 after Siren Entertainment's license to the Manga Video catalog expired, but PolyGram lost the license to the Manga Video catalog in 1998 after Madman Entertainment took over the licenses. This was due to Manga Entertainment being moved from Island Records to Palm Pictures.

PolyGram also built up a sizable film and television library that could be profitable. In 1995, the company purchased ITC Entertainment for $156 million. Through this purchase, PolyGram acquired 350 feature films, several thousand hours of television programming, and gained further access into the television market. That same year, PolyGram Filmed Entertainment acquired a 75% majority stake in British home video distributor Abbey Home Entertainment. In 1997, PFE agreed to purchase the Epic film library, which included a thousand feature films from a variety of companies, from Crédit Lyonnais for $225 million. PolyGram also attempted purchasing MGM and The Samuel Goldwyn Company's library, but to no avail. In July 1998, PolyGram was in talks to sell their stake in Abbey Home Entertainment back to Ian and Anne Miles, letting AHE trade independently again, in exchange, PolyGram Video would take over releasing Fun Song Factory titles, around the same time, PolyGram purchased Astrion plc and placed it within Vision Video Ltd, as a result, they would take over releasing Letterland titles. On December 7, 1997, PolyGram and Warner Bros. reached a deal to co-finance films produced by Castle Rock Entertainment.

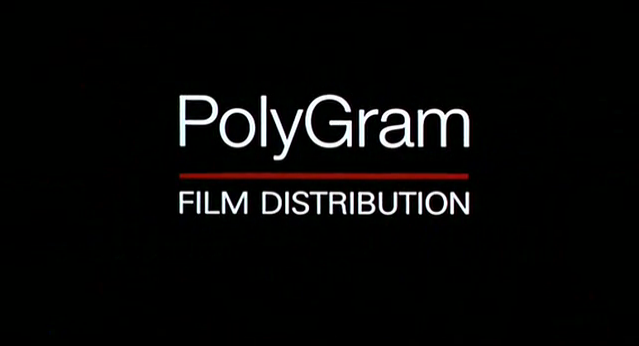
PolyGram Film Distribution logo, used in 1998.

PFE's film distribution arm was based in the United Kingdom, and invested heavily in British film making — some credit it with reviving the British film industry in the 1990s. Despite a successful production history, new Philips CEO Cor Boonstra began to draw back Philips' media operations, excepting their stake in PolyGram, in 1997. At the time, Philips was seen as a bloated conglomerate riddled with problems; Boonstra initially denied that PolyGram would be sold. However, by early 1998, Boonstra's attitude had shifted and various bidders began to make themselves known, as Philips began to pursue a manufacturing-only business model. At the same time, PolyGram had been suffering from their own internal issues, chiefly a series of loss-making films and a lack of major pop music hits. In hindsight, analysts have also pointed to another reason for Boonstra's sale of the assets, namely Philips manufacturing blank CDs, as music piracy subsequently impacted the music industry hugely in the years afterwards.

Philips ultimately decided to sell PolyGram to the beverage conglomerate Seagram in 1998 (Seagram had chosen PolyGram over EMI because of PolyGram's better management); only interested in PolyGram's music operations, Seagram, which at the time controlled Universal Pictures, looked forward to divesting in PFE. After being dissatisfied with offers to buy the studio (including a joint venture between Canal+ and Artisan Entertainment), Seagram opted to sell off individual assets and folded whatever remained into Universal. In October 1998, Metro-Goldwyn-Mayer (MGM) paid $235–250 million to acquire 1,300 films released before March 31, 1996, from PolyGram, however, the deal did not include the ITC library or the film, The Last Seduction II, which in 1999, were sold to Carlton Communications (now known as ITV Studios) for $150 million. Some of PFE's North American distribution assets, including PolyGram Video's US and Canada operations were sold to USA Networks. Universal would inherit the remaining titles, which included a third of the pre-April 1996 films, one-third of the post-April 1996 films, as well as PolyGram Television's library, and PolyGram Video's international operations. Universal would then set up their own international arm from the ashes of PFE's international division on February 9, 1999 that included theatrical and video distribution; pulling out of CIC Video and nearly pulling out of United International Pictures. After the box office failure of Mickey Blue Eyes, a title inherited from PolyGram that ended up becoming one of the few titles that were self-distributed by Universal internationally until 2007, all the theatrical assets of Universal Pictures International were folded into United International Pictures, which continued to exist until 2006.

== Production companies ==
- Working Title Films (UK), acquired by PFE in 1991.
- Propaganda Films (US), acquired by PFE in 1991.
- Interscope Communications (US), 51% acquired by PFE in 1992, remaining acquired in 1994.
- Gramercy Pictures (US), launched by PFE and Universal in 1992.
- ITC Entertainment (UK), acquired by PFE in 1995.
- A&M Films (theatrical film division of A&M Records)
- Island Pictures (theatrical film division of Island Records), acquired December 1994, closed 1997.
- Cinéa (France)
- Meteor Film Productions (Netherlands), acquired by PFE in 1994.
- PolyGram Video
  - 4 Front Video
  - Spectrum Video
  - Abbey Home Entertainment (UK), 75% majority stake acquired by PFE in 1995. Sold back to original owners in 1998, prior to PolyGram being purchased by Seagram.
  - Channel 5 Video (initially a joint venture label with Heron Communications)
  - Vision Video Ltd
    - Astrion Plc
- PolyGram Television
- PolyGram Visual Programming

== US distribution ==
On May 20, 1992, PolyGram partnered with Universal Pictures to create a joint venture called Gramercy Pictures. Gramercy primarily distributed PolyGram films in the United States, and it doubled as a specialty label for Universal. In 1993, the company also had another distribution deal with Metro-Goldwyn-Mayer to fund and distribute its films. On January 11, 1996, PolyGram bought out Universal's 50% stake and in 1997, PolyGram Films was founded to release PFE's mainstream titles in the United States, while Gramercy became a low-budget/art-house sublabel. PolyGram Films' first release was The Game. When PolyGram was acquired by Universal in 1999, the company merged Gramercy with October Films and Interscope Communications, which included its subsidiary Rogue Pictures to create USA Films, which eventually became Focus Features. Gramercy was revived on May 12, 2015 as a label of Focus Features, but shut down and went dormant in 2016.

== Selected films ==
Among the films directly produced by PFE were:

=== 1970s ===
Release date	Title	Notes
17 June 1977	The Deep	co-production with Columbia Pictures and EMI Films
19 May 1978	Thank God It's Friday	co-production with Columbia Pictures and Motown Productions
6 October 1978	Midnight Express	co-production with Columbia Pictures
9 February 1979	Agatha	co-production with First Artists and Warner Bros.

=== 1980s ===
Release date	Title	Notes
29 February 1980	Foxes	distributed by United Artists
30 May 1980	The Hollywood Knights	co-production with Columbia Pictures
1 May 1981	King of the Mountain (Note: Ancillary rights owned by Universal Pictures; television, digital and streaming rights owned by Lionsgate (via Hearst Entertainment))	distributed by Universal Pictures
17 July 1981	Endless Love	distributed by Universal Pictures
14 August 1981	Deadly Blessing	distributed by United Artists
21 August 1981	An American Werewolf in London	distributed by Universal Pictures
13 November 1981	The Pursuit of D. B. Cooper	distributed by Universal Pictures
12 March 1982	Missing	co-production with Universal Pictures
3 October 1982	Split Image	distributed by Orion Pictures
24 December 1982	Six Weeks	distributed by Universal Pictures
15 April 1983	Flashdance	co-production with Paramount Pictures
13 December 1985	A Chorus Line	co-production with Embassy Pictures; distributed by Columbia Pictures
13 December 1985	Clue	co-production with Paramount Pictures
5 June 1987	P.I. Private Investigations	distributed by Metro-Goldwyn-Mayer
22 April 1988	The Blue Iguana	distributed by Paramount Pictures
23 June 1989	Batman	studio credit only; produced by Warner Bros. and The Guber-Peters Company
27 October 1989	Kill Me Again	distributed by Metro-Goldwyn-Mayer
8 December 1989	Fear, Anxiety & Depression	distributed by The Samuel Goldwyn Company

=== 1990s ===
Release date	Title	Notes	U.S. distributor
27 July 1990	Chicago Joe and the Showgirl	co-production with Working Title Films	New Line Cinema
17 August 1990	Wild at Heart	co-production with Propaganda Films	The Samuel Goldwyn Company
14 September 1990	Fools of Fortune	international distribution only; co-production with Working Title Films and Film Four International	New Line Cinema
24 May 1991	Drop Dead Fred	international distribution only; co-production with Working Title Films	New Line Cinema
21 August 1991	Barton Fink	international distribution only; produced by Circle Films	20th Century Fox
17 January 1992	A Gnome Named Gnorm	distribution only; produced by Interscope Communications and Trilogy Entertainment Group	PolyGram Video
27 March 1992	Ruby	international distribution only; co-production with Propaganda Films	Triumph Films
15 May 1992	Rubin & Ed (Note: Owned by Sony Pictures)	international theatrical and television distribution only; produced by Working Title Films	IRS Media
19 June 1992	Batman Returns	studio credit only; produced by Warner Bros. Pictures, DC Comics, Tim Burton Productions and De Novi Pictures	Warner Bros. Pictures
17 July 1992	A Stranger Among Us	international distribution only; produced by Propaganda Films and Sandollar Productions	Hollywood Pictures (through Buena Vista Pictures Distribution)
7 August 1992	London Kills Me	international distribution only; co-production with Working Title Films and Film Four International	Fine Line Features (through New Line Cinema)
4 September 1992	Bob Roberts	international distribution only; co-production with Working Title Films	Paramount Pictures; Miramax Films (theatrical); LIVE Entertainment (home video)
16 October 1992	Candyman	international distribution outside Latin America, Germany, Austria, Greece, Cyprus, Eastern Europe, the Middle East, Israel and Korea only; co-production with Propaganda Films	TriStar Pictures
23 April 1993	Map of the Human Heart	international distribution outside France, Australia and New Zealand only; produced by Working Title Films, Vincent Ward Productions, Sunrise Films and Map Films	Miramax Films
14 May 1993	Posse (Note: Owned by MGM)	co-production with Working Title Films	Gramercy Pictures
20 August 1993	The Ballad of Little Jo (Note: Owned by the film's producers, with U.S. distribution rights licensed to Kino Lorber)	select international distribution only	Fine Line Features (through New Line Cinema)
3 September 1993	Kalifornia	distribution outside U.S. premium television and syndication only; co-production with Viacom Pictures and Propaganda Films	Gramercy Pictures
5 November 1993	A Home of Our Own	co-production with A&M Films	Gramercy Pictures
7 January 1994	The Air Up There	studio credit only; produced by Hollywood Pictures, Interscope Communications and Longview Entertainment	Buena Vista Pictures Distribution
4 February 1994	Romeo Is Bleeding	co-production with Working Title Films; Most 1994–95 PolyGram films currently owned by MGM unless mentioned otherwise	Gramercy Pictures
11 March 1994	Four Weddings and a Funeral	co-production with Channel Four Films and Working Title Films	Gramercy Pictures
11 March 1994	The Hudsucker Proxy (Note: Retained by Universal Pictures)	international distribution only; co-production with Warner Bros. Pictures, Silver Pictures and Working Title Films	Warner Bros. Pictures
8 April 1994	Holy Matrimony	international distribution only; produced by Interscope Communications and Aurora Productions	Hollywood Pictures (through Buena Vista Pictures Distribution)
8 April 1994	Red Rock West	international distribution only; co-production with Propaganda Films	Roxie Releasing (theatrical); Columbia TriStar Home Video (home video)
15 April 1994	Backbeat	co-production with Scala Productions	Gramercy Pictures
6 May 1994	Dream Lover	co-production with Propaganda Films, Nicita/Lloyd Productions and Edward R. Pressman Productions	Gramercy Pictures
18 May 1994	Final Combination	co-production with Propaganda Films	PolyGram Video
15 July 1994	A Pig's Tale	co-production with Propaganda Films	PolyGram Video
10 August 1994	The Adventures of Priscilla, Queen of the Desert	co-production with Latent Image Productions and Specific Films	Gramercy Pictures
7 September 1994	The Young Americans	international distribution only; co-production with Working Title Films	LIVE Entertainment
23 September 1994	Terminal Velocity	studio credit only; produced by Hollywood Pictures and Interscope Communications	Buena Vista Pictures Distribution
28 September 1994	Jason's Lyric	co-production with Propaganda Films and the Jackson/McHenry Company	Gramercy Pictures
16 December 1994	Nell	international distribution outside Latin America only; produced by Egg Pictures	20th Century Fox
20 January 1995	S.F.W.	co-production with A&M Films and Propaganda Films	Gramercy Pictures
10 February 1995	Shallow Grave (Note: Owned by Film4 Productions)	North American, U.K., Irish, French and Benelux distribution only; produced by Channel Four International and Figment Films	Gramercy Pictures
24 February 1995	Before the Rain	co-distribution outside former Yugoslavia with Working Title Films only	Gramercy Pictures
3 March 1995	Roommates	studio credit only; produced by Hollywood Pictures and Interscope Communications	Buena Vista Pictures Distribution
17 March 1995	Candyman: Farewell to the Flesh	co-production with Propaganda Films	Gramercy Pictures
21 April 1995	The Basketball Diaries	international distribution only; produced by Island Pictures; rights licensed to First Independent Films for the U.K. and Ireland and Roadshow Entertainment for Australia and New Zealand	New Line Cinema
3 May 1995	Panther	co-production with Working Title Films, Tribeca Productions and MVP Films	Gramercy Pictures
5 May 1995	French Kiss	international distribution only; produced by Working Title Films and Prufrock Pictures	20th Century Fox
16 June 1995	Batman Forever	studio credit only; produced by Warner Bros. Pictures, DC Comics and Tim Burton Productions	Warner Bros. Pictures
30 June 1995	Innocent Lies		PolyGram Video
28 July 1995	Operation Dumbo Drop	associate credit only; produced by Walt Disney Pictures and Interscope Communications	Buena Vista Pictures Distribution
16 August 1995	The Usual Suspects	North American, U.K., Irish, French and Benelux distribution only; co-production with Spelling Films International, Blue Parrot Productions and Bad Hat Harry Films	Gramercy Pictures
8 September 1995	The Tie That Binds	international distribution only; produced by Interscope Communications	Hollywood Pictures (through Buena Vista Pictures Distribution)
15 September 1995	Coldblooded	international distribution only; co-production with Propaganda Films and Motion Picture Corporation of America	IRS Media
22 September 1995	Canadian Bacon	co-production with Propaganda Films and Maverick Picture Company	Gramercy Pictures
29 September 1995	Moonlight and Valentino	co-production with Working Title Films	Gramercy Pictures
3 November 1995	Home for the Holidays	home media, pay television and international theatrical distribution outside South America only; produced by Egg Pictures	Paramount Pictures
10 November 1995	Carrington		Gramercy Pictures
29 December 1995	Dead Man Walking	co-production with Working Title Films and Havoc Productions	Gramercy Pictures
29 December 1995	Mr. Holland's Opus	international distribution only; produced by Interscope Communications and the Charlie Mopic Company	Hollywood Pictures (through Buena Vista Pictures Distribution)
23 February 1996	La Haine (Note: Owned by Le Pacte and StudioCanal, with U.S. distribution rights licensed to The Criterion Collection and Janus Films)	North American co-distribution with Egg Pictures only; produced by Lazennec Productions and Le Studio Canal+ Most films released since this point are owned by Universal Pictures	Gramercy Pictures
8 March 1996	Fargo	co-production with Working Title Films; Inducted into the National Film Registry in 2006	Gramercy Pictures
15 March 1996	Two Much	international distribution outside Spain only; produced by Interscope Communications, Lolafilms, Sogetel and Fernando Trueba Producciones Cinematográficas S.A.	Touchstone Pictures (through Buena Vista Pictures Distribution)
22 March 1996	Jack and Sarah	co-production with Le Studio Canal+ and Granada Productions	Gramercy Pictures
22 March 1996	Land and Freedom	North American distribution only	Gramercy Pictures
3 May 1996	Barb Wire	co-production with Propaganda Films and Dark Horse Entertainment	Gramercy Pictures
10 May 1996	Boys	international distribution only; produced by Interscope Communications	Touchstone Pictures (through Buena Vista Pictures Distribution)
31 May 1996	Eddie	international distribution only; produced by Island Pictures; rights licensed to First Independent Films for the U.K. and Ireland and Roadshow Entertainment for Australia and New Zealand; Last film in the pre-April 1996 library owned by Metro-Goldwyn-Mayer	Hollywood Pictures (through Buena Vista Pictures Distribution)
17 July 1996	Kazaam	international distribution only; produced by Interscope Communications	Touchstone Pictures (through Buena Vista Pictures Distribution)
19 July 1996	Trainspotting	distribution in the U.K., Ireland, Australia, New Zealand, France, Spain, the Benelux and Turkey only; produced by Channel Four Films, Figment Films and Noel Gay Motion Picture Company	Miramax Films
20 September 1996	Loch Ness	co-production with Working Title Films	ABC
18 October 1996	Sleepers	international distribution only; produced by Propaganda Films, Baltimore Pictures and Astoria Films	Warner Bros. Pictures
18 October 1996	Jude	co-production with BBC Films and Revolution Films	Gramercy Pictures
25 October 1996	When We Were Kings (Note: Owned by Shout! Studios (via Westchester Films))	distribution only	Gramercy Pictures
25 October 1996	The Associate	international distribution only; produced by Interscope Communications	Hollywood Pictures (through Buena Vista Pictures Distribution)
24 December 1996	The Portrait of a Lady	co-production with Propaganda Films	Gramercy Pictures
10 January 1997	The Relic	international distribution outside Germany, Austria, Switzerland and Japan only; produced by Cloud Nine Entertainment and Pacific Western Productions	Paramount Pictures
29 January 1997	Gridlock'd	co-production with Interscope Communications, Def Pictures, Webster and Dragon Pictures	Gramercy Pictures
7 March 1997	The Eighth Day	distribution in the U.S., the U.K., Ireland, Australia, New Zealand, South Africa, France, Germany, Austria, Spain and the Benelux only; produced by Pan-Européenne and Working Title Films	Gramercy Pictures
11 April 1997	Keys to Tulsa (Note: Owned by ITV Studios)	distribution only; produced by ITC Entertainment	Gramercy Pictures
9 May 1997	Twin Town	co-production with Figment Films	Gramercy Pictures
20 June 1997	Batman & Robin	studio credit only; produced by Warner Bros. Pictures and DC Comics	Warner Bros. Pictures
6 August 1997	Def Jam's How to Be a Player	co-production with Island Pictures and Outlaw Productions	Gramercy Pictures
24 August 1997	Snow White: A Tale of Terror	co-production with Interscope Communications	Showtime
12 September 1997	The Game	co-production with Propaganda Films	PolyGram Films
19 September 1997	Going All the Way (Note: Owned by Shamrock Holdings, with distribution rights currently licensed to Shout! Studios and Oscilloscope Pictures)	North American, U.K. and Irish distribution only; produced by Lakeshore Entertainment	Gramercy Pictures
19 September 1997	A Thousand Acres	international distribution only; produced by Beacon Pictures, Propaganda Films, Via Rosa Productions and Prairie Films	Touchstone Pictures (through Buena Vista Pictures Distribution)
3 October 1997	The Matchmaker	co-production with Working Title Films	Gramercy Pictures
17 October 1997	Bean	co-production with Working Title Films and Tiger Aspect Films	Gramercy Pictures
24 October 1997	A Life Less Ordinary	distribution in the U.K., Ireland, Australia, New Zealand, France, Germany, Austria, Switzerland, Spain and the Benelux only; produced by Figment Films and Channel Four Films	20th Century Fox
17 December 1997	Guy		Gramercy Pictures
16 January 1998	Hard Rain	international distribution outside France, Germany, Austria, Switzerland, Scandinavia and Japan only; produced by Mutual Film Company	Paramount Pictures
23 January 1998	Spice World	distribution in the U.K., Ireland, Australia, New Zealand, France, Germany, Austria, Spain and the Benelux only; produced by Fragile Films	Columbia Pictures (through Sony Pictures Releasing)
23 January 1998	The Gingerbread Man	co-production with Island Pictures and Enchanter Entertainment	PolyGram Films
13 February 1998	The Borrowers	co-production with Working Title Films	PolyGram Films
18 February 1998	I Want You	co-production with Revolution Films	Gramercy Pictures
6 March 1998	The Big Lebowski	co-production with Working Title Films; Inducted into the National Film Registry in 2014	Gramercy Pictures
27 March 1998	No Looking Back	North American distribution only; produced by Marlboro Road Gang, Good Machine and South Fork Pictures	Gramercy Pictures
27 March 1998	The Proposition	co-production with Interscope Communications	PolyGram Films
3 April 1998	Barney's Great Adventure: The Movie (Note: Owned by Mattel)	distribution only; produced by Lyrick Studios	PolyGram Films
1 May 1998	Go Now	North American, U.K. and Irish distribution only; produced by Revolution Films	Gramercy Pictures
29 May 1998	The Last Days of Disco	North American, Australian and New Zealand distribution only; produced by Castle Rock Entertainment	Gramercy Pictures
12 June 1998	The Land Girls (Note: Distribution rights co-owned by Resurgence Media Group)	North American distribution only; produced by Intermedia Films and Channel Four Films	Gramercy Pictures
14 August 1998	Return to Paradise	co-production with Propaganda Films and Tetragram	PolyGram Films
21 August 1998	Your Friends & Neighbors	co-production with Propaganda Films	Gramercy Pictures
25 September 1998	Clay Pigeons	North American distribution only; produced by Intermedia Films and Scott Free Productions	Gramercy Pictures
2 October 1998	What Dreams May Come	co-production with Interscope Communications	PolyGram Films
6 November 1998	Elizabeth	co-production with Channel Four Films and Working Title Films	Gramercy Pictures
13 November 1998	Thursday	co-production with Propaganda Films	Legacy Releasing
25 November 1998	Very Bad Things	North American, U.K., Irish and Benelux distribution only; produced by Initial Entertainment Group, Interscope Communications and Ballpark Productions	PolyGram Films
30 December 1998	The Hi-Lo Country	co-production with Working Title Films and Cappa/De Fina	Gramercy Pictures
February 1999	Choke	co-production with Propaganda Films	PolyGram Visual Programming
5 March 1999	Lock, Stock and Two Smoking Barrels (Note: International rights owned by Lionsgate)	distribution in North America, the U.K., Ireland, Australia, New Zealand, France, Germany, Austria, Switzerland, Spain and the Benelux only; produced by the Steve Tisch Company, SKA Films and HandMade Films	Gramercy Pictures
28 May 1999	Notting Hill	co-production with Working Title Films	Universal Pictures
9 July 1999	Arlington Road	distribution in the U.K., Ireland, Australia, New Zealand, France, Germany, Austria, Switzerland and the Benelux only; produced by Lakeshore Entertainment	Screen Gems (through Sony Pictures Releasing)
20 August 1999	Mickey Blue Eyes	as Universal Pictures International; international distribution outside Latin America, Scandinavia, Turkey and Asia excluding Japan only; produced by Castle Rock Entertainment and Simian Films	Warner Bros. Pictures
1 October 1999	Plunkett & Macleane	international distribution only; produced by Working Title Films	USA Films
29 October 1999	Being John Malkovich	as Universal Pictures International; international distribution only; produced by Propaganda Films and Single Cell Pictures	USA Films
10 December 1999	The Green Mile	as Universal Pictures International; international distribution outside Latin America, Scandinavia, Turkey and Asia excluding Japan only; produced by Castle Rock Entertainment and Darkwoods Productions	Warner Bros. Pictures
25 December 1999	Angela's Ashes	as Universal Pictures International; international distribution only; co-production with Paramount Pictures, David Brown Productions, Scott Rudin Productions and Dirty Hands Productions	Paramount Pictures

=== 2000s ===
Release date	Title	Notes	U.S. distributor
18 February 2000	Pitch Black	as Universal Pictures International; international distribution only; produced by Interscope Communications	USA Films
24 March 2000	Waking the Dead	as Universal Pictures International; international distribution only; produced by Egg Pictures	USA Films
April 14, 2000	Where the Money Is	as Universal Pictures International; international distribution only; produced by Gramercy Pictures, Intermedia Films, Pacifica Film Distribution and Scott Free Productions	USA Films
28 July 2000	Wonderland	as Universal Pictures International; co-production with BBC Films, Kismet Film Company and Revolution Films	USA Films
4 August 2000	Mad About Mambo	as Universal Pictures International; international distribution only; produced by Phoenix Pictures, First City Features and Plurabelle Films	USA Films
8 September 2000	Nurse Betty	as Universal Pictures international; distribution in Latin America, Italy, Australia, New Zealand and Japan only; produced by Pacifica Film Distribution, Propaganda Films and ab'-strakt pictures	USA Films

== See also ==
- 100 Films and a Funeral, a documentary film about the rise and fall of PFE.
