= Kazaam =

1996 film by Paul Michael Glaser

- Theatrical release poster
- Directed by: Paul Michael Glaser
- Screenplay by: Christian Ford; Roger Soffer
- Story by: Paul Michael Glaser
- Produced by: Paul Michael Glaser; Scott Kroopf; Bob Engelman
- Starring: Shaquille O'Neal; Francis Capra; Ally Walker; James Acheson
- Cinematography: Charles Minsky
- Edited by: Tom McMurtry; Michael E. Polakow
- Music by: Christopher Tyng
- Production companies: Touchstone Pictures; Interscope Communications; PolyGram Filmed Entertainment
- Distributed by: Buena Vista Pictures Distribution; (North America); PolyGram Filmed Entertainment; (International)
- Release date: July 17, 1996
- Running time: 94 minutes
- Country: United States
- Language: English
- Budget: $20 million
- Box office: $18.9 million

Kazaam (/kəˈzæm/) is a 1996 American musical fantasy comedy film directed by Paul Michael Glaser, written by Christian Ford and Roger Soffer based on a story by Glaser, and starring Shaquille O'Neal as the title character, a 5,000-year-old genie who appears from a magic boombox to grant a 12-year-old boy three wishes.

The film was released on July 17, 1996, grossing $18.9 million on its $20 million budget, making it a box office disappointment. The film was met with negative reviews from critics.

== Plot ==
In the story, a wrecking ball demolishes an abandoned building, causing a magic lamp inside to fall onto a boombox. The genie inside, named Kazaam, now inhabits the boombox. Meanwhile, a boy named Max Conner is running from bullies and seeks refuge in the abandoned building, where he accidentally releases Kazaam from the boombox. Kazaam chases off the bullies, and asks Max to make three wishes. Max, believing Kazaam is a crank, mockingly wishes for a Jaguar XK-E, but Kazaam, rusty from having spent thousands of years in the lamp, is unable to grant the wish and accidentally makes himself disappear. Max is subsequently caught and beaten up by the bullies.

Max discovers his mother plans divorce his father (who left them when Max was two) to marry a fireman named Travis O'Neil. Max finds his father Nick Matteo, a musical agent working in the illicit underground scene, but Nick does not recognise Max.

Kazaam continues to pester Max to make three wishes so that he can return to rest in the boombox. Kazaam demonstrates his magical powers, causing Max to realise he is a real genie. Max makes his first wish, causing junk food to rain from the sky. Max realizes he Kazaam has to stay with him until he has used all three of his wishes. They visit Nick again, and Nick finally recognises Max as his son. Kazaam performs a rap at a nightclub, which impresses the owner Malik, who sends Asia, one of his female employees to find out more about Kazaam and his boombox.

Max confides in Kazaam about his strained relationship with his father, and Kazaam shares a rap about his own genie origins. Max tries to wish for his parents to rekindle their love, but Kazaam cannot grant ethereal wishes since he is not a djinn.

The bullies force Max to steal a master tape from his father. Max witnesses his father being attacked by Malik and his hitmen because of the missing master tape. Max uses his second wish to conjure a replacement tape, causing a rift between him and Kazaam who is suspicious about the reason for the wish. Nick confronts Max about the stolen tape, warning Max not to go down the same road of crime that he did, and telling him to stay away from him.

Malik, the nightclub owner, watches CCTV footage of Kazaam conjuring the replacement tape using the boombox, and realises his power. Kazaam continues to perform raps at the nightclub, becoming more renowned. Max tries use his final wish for his father to be have a second chance in life, but Kazaam states he is unable to grant such a wish, leading to Max bitterly claiming Kazaam would rather pursue his rap career than return to the boombox.

Malik steals the boombox and kidnaps Nick and Max, demanding Max use his final wish to make Malik have all the money in the world. When Max refuses, Malik pushes him down an elevator shaft to his death. Malik tries to take over as Kazaam's master, but Kazaam breaks free from the boombox's control and defeats Malik and his minions, transforming Malik into a basketball and dunking him into a garbage disposal.

Kazaam discovers Max's lifeless body and in grief, desperately wishes he could have granted Max's final wish.

Kazaam's own wish comes true, as Max comes back to live, and Kazaam transforms into a Djinn, now free and no longer bound to the box. Travis carries Max out of the burning building. Nick expresses his desire to rebuild their relationship before leaving with the authorities. Kazaam, now a djinn, walks away, facing the lighthearted annoyance of his new girlfriend, who pressures him into getting a job. Max watches Kazaam walk away with a smile.

== Cast ==
- Shaquille O'Neal as Kazaam
- Francis Capra as Maxwell "Max" Connor
- Ally Walker as Alice Connor
- James Acheson as Nicholas "Nick" Matteo
- John Costelloe as Travis O'Neil
- Marshall Manesh as Malik
- Fawn Reed as Asia Moon
- Mother Love as Mrs. Duke
- Wade Robson as Elito
- Jake Glaser as Jake
- Efren Ramirez as Carlos
- Steven Barr as Sam
- Deidra Roper as Spinderella
- Da Brat as Herself
- Deborah Rennard as Malik's Date

== Production ==
The film's origins began with director Paul Michael Glaser taking his son to the NBA All-Star game, when an acquaintance, who was on Shaquille O'Neal's management team, called and asked if his son would like to meet him. After saying yes, the acquaintance asked, in passing, if he knew of any film roles for Shaquille, to which Glaser replied, "He should play a genie", which laid the foundation for what would become Kazaam. In a very short time, Glaser took Kazaam to Warner Bros. as they had the Michael Jordan project Space Jam, and Glaser also went back to Interscope Communications, where he had already done two pictures. Glaser had to have a screenplay and a green light in ten and a half weeks, or he wouldn't be able to make the movie as Shaquille had to go back to basketball camp. The script was written in six and a half weeks with production commencing after ten before going into Turnaround where it was acquired by Disney.

== Release ==
The film was theatrically released on July 17, 1996. A home video release followed on November 19, 1996.

== Reception and legacy ==
Kazaam has been heavily panned by critics since its release. On Rotten Tomatoes, the film has an approval rating of 5% based on 38 reviews and an average rating of 3.1/10. The site's critical consensus reads, "Crafted from a mix of genre clichés, Kazaam doesn't know what kind of film it wants to be, and Shaq's larger-than-life charisma is stifled by rote filmmaking and an unimaginative story." On Metacritic, the film has a score of 24 out of 100 based on 14 critics, indicating "generally unfavorable reviews". Audiences surveyed by CinemaScore had a more positive reception to the film, giving it "B+" grade on scale of A+ to F.

Roger Ebert gave the film 1.5 stars, writing: "Shaq has already proven he can act (in Blue Chips, the 1994 movie about college basketball). Here he shows he can be likable in a children's movie. What he does not show is good judgment in his choice of material. [...] the filmmakers didn't care to extend themselves beyond the obvious commercial possibilities of their first dim idea." Gene Siskel of the Chicago Tribune awarded the film one star and described the film as "the kind of project someone probably told Shaq would sell to kids. It's marketing, not moviemaking."

Shaquille O'Neal's performance in the film was considered poor and has since been referenced in a number of movies, including Scary Movie. The film grossed $18.9 million against a $20 million production budget. In a 2012 interview with GQ magazine, O'Neal said: "I was a medium-level juvenile delinquent from Newark who always dreamed about doing a movie. Someone said, 'Hey, here's $7 million, come in and do this genie movie.' What am I going to say, no? So I did it."

=== Shazaam ===
Many people falsely remember a similar 1990s film titled Shazaam, starring comedian and actor Sinbad as a genie. However, no such film ever existed, and it is possible people are misremembering Kazaam as the aforementioned film.

== See also ==
- List of Shaquille O'Neal films
