= Terminal Velocity (film) =

- Film poster
- Directed by: Deran Sarafian
- Written by: David Twohy
- Produced by: Ron Booth; Tom Engelman; Scott Kroopf
- Starring: Charlie Sheen; Nastassja Kinski; James Gandolfini; Christopher McDonald
- Cinematography: Oliver Wood
- Edited by: Frank J. Urioste
- Music by: Joel McNeely
- Production companies: Hollywood Pictures; Interscope Communications; PolyGram Filmed Entertainment; Nomura Babcock & Brown
- Distributed by: Buena Vista Pictures Distribution
- Release date: September 23, 1994
- Running time: 102 minutes
- Country: United States
- Language: English
- Budget: $50 million
- Box office: $47 million

Terminal Velocity is a 1994 American action film directed by Deran Sarafian, written by David Twohy, and starring Charlie Sheen, Nastassja Kinski, James Gandolfini, and Christopher McDonald. It follows a daredevil skydiver (Sheen) who is caught up in a criminal plot by Russian mobsters (Gandolfini and McDonald), forcing him to team up with a freelance secret agent (Kinski) in order to survive.

It was one of two skydiving-themed action films released in the fourth quarter of 1994 (the other being Paramount Pictures' Drop Zone), and received mostly negative reviews from critics.

== Plot ==
About to leave the country, a young Russian woman is ambushed in her Tucson apartment after calling her contact about a Boeing 747 she witnessed landing in the desert. The lead assailant, Kerr, tortures her for information about her roommate before drowning her in an aquarium.

Former Olympic gymnast-turned-daredevil skydiver Richard "Ditch" Brodie participates in an illegal BASE jump off a skyscraper, despite his jump school being under tight scrutiny by the FAA. Upon returning to his school, he's approached by a beautiful but nervous woman named Chris Morrow, who insists on performing a static jump from cruising altitude immediately. Playing along due to her flirtatious attitude, Ditch agrees to take her himself.

During the flight, Chris briefly spots another aircraft below. When Ditch checks to see if his pilot has noticed it, Chris cuts ties with Ditch and jumps on her own. Ditch spots Chris tumbling uncontrollably below him, and is unable to save her before she hits the ground at terminal velocity. An investigation ensues, and the school is closed down indefinitely.

Feeling guilty and confused, Ditch rifles through Chris' personal belongings, and finds her apartment key. There he finds a photograph of Chris performing a jump, thus contradicting her earlier claim of inexperience. Ditch is attacked by Kerr, but fends him off and escapes. At the flight school, Ditch is approached by Assistant District Attorney Ben Pinkwater, who tells Ditch he may be charged with manslaughter for Chris' death.

Later, Ditch sees the same plane that had been following him during the jump, and follows it to a shack where he finds Chris alive, having faked her death using her roommate's body. She then takes Ditch on an unexplained nighttime jump at an aeronautics plant, promising to clear his name if he co-operates. Chris has Ditch infiltrate the plant via a smokestack and disable the security system before stealing a hidden optical disc. Kerr and his men arrive, forcing Ditch to flee from gunfire back to his school.

Wanting his name cleared, he arranges a meeting with Chris and Pinkwater at a scrapyard, but upon arriving Pinkwater kills Chris' partner Lex, revealing himself to be a cohort of Kerr's. A firefight ensues, and Chris and Ditch escape using a makeshift rocket car.

Taking shelter in the desert, Chris reveals that her real name is Krista Moldova, and that she and her pursuers are former KGB operatives, left unemployed due to the collapse of the Soviet Union. "Pinkwater" and his men have fallen in with the Russian mob, and have hijacked a shipment of gold bullion intended for the Moscow reserve, and intend to use it to finance a coup d'état against the democratic Russian government. Using the optical disc retrieved by Ditch, Chris determines the location of the missing Boeing 747 carrying the shipment. She and Ditch get on board and find the gold, but are discovered by Pinkwater's men. The two barely escape, and Ditch decides to quit while Chris heads off to face Pinkwater alone.

As Ditch is about to leave on a bus, he finds a picture taken by Chris holding up a sign reading "Ditch Did Not Kill Me", thereby exonerating him. Having a change of heart, Ditch drives off to the airfield just as Pinkwater and his men take off, having kidnapped Chris. Posing as an FAA agent, Ditch convinces a biplane stunt pilot to fly him up and onto the 747. Ditch gets on board just as Chris is stuffed in the trunk of Kerr's sports car to be killed.

Ditch and Kerr get into a fight, driving the car out of the cargo hold and plummeting toward the ground below. Ditch manages to force Kerr off sending him falling several thousands of feet to his death, and gets Chris out of the trunk before it hits the ground. The two land in a nearby wind farm, and the plane, damaged in the fight, is forced to land. As police swarm the runway, Chris and Ditch are attacked by a parachuting Pinkwater, and Chris is stabbed in the back. Ditch pulls Pinkwater's back-up chute, sucking him into a nearby turbine and killing him.

Some time later, Ditch and Chris receive official commendations at the Kremlin for their actions in preventing the coup.

== Cast ==
- Charlie Sheen as Richard 'Ditch' Brodie
- Nastassja Kinski as Agent Krista Moldova / Chris Morrow
- James Gandolfini as Stefan / Ben Pinkwater
- Christopher McDonald as Kerr
- Suli McCullough as 'Robocam'
- Hans R. Howes as Sam
- Melvin Van Peebles as Noble
- Gary Bullock as Agent Lex
- Margaret Colin as Joline
- Cathryn de Prume as Agent Karen
- Rance Howard as Chuck
- Sofia Shinas as Maxine 'Broken Legs Max'

== Production ==
Based on David Twohy’s original spec script which sold to Hollywood Pictures for over $500,000 Kevin Reynolds and Tom Cruise were initially slated as director and star, but commitments prevented this.

The final stunt, which features Sheen at the wheel of a Cadillac Allanté falling to earth, was a mixture of bluescreen and camera work, as a real car was suspended beneath a helicopter and then a reverse zoom made it seem as if it were in free-fall.

Portions of the film were shot in Palm Springs, California. Other filming locations were Alabama Hills (Lone Pine, California); a windfarm near Tehachapi, California; Douglas, Arizona; Flagstaff, Arizona; Little Colorado River Canyon, Arizona; Moscow, Russia; Phoenix, Arizona; San Bernardino, California and Tucson, Arizona, where a cameo appearance by Martha Vasquez of its station KVOA was filmed.

== Reception ==
The film debuted at number 2 at the US box office behind Timecop in its second week with an opening weekend gross of $5.5 million. It eventually grossed $16.5 million in the United States and Canada and over $31 million internationally, for a worldwide total of over $47 million compared to its $50 million budget.

It received mostly negative reviews by critics; it has a 19% positive scale on the ratings aggregator website Rotten Tomatoes, based on 26 reviews. Owen Gleiberman opined that "Terminal Velocity is the kind of movie in which the hero keeps sneaking into rooms to peek into some file and you wait, with glum certitude, for yet another 'surprise' thug to leap out of the shadows. It's fun to hear Charlie Sheen deliver quips like, 'I'm not just a walking penis — I'm a flying penis!' But for most of the movie, Sheen, lowering his voice to a basso he-man growl, gives a boringly flat, square-jawed performance, as if he thought he were doing Hot Shots! Part Quatre."

Roger Ebert suggested that "Sheen's behavior in this and other scenes is so close to the self-parody of his work in the Hot Shots! movies that he almost seems to be telling us something — such as, that he takes the movie with less than perfect seriousness. No wonder. It's based on such a goofy premise that with just a nudge here and a pun there it could easily have become 'Hot Shots Part Cinq' and taken advantage of the franchise. It's not so much that Sheen can keep a straight face in any situation, as that he always seems to be testing himself with the situations he gets himself into."

== Year-end lists ==
- Honorable mention – David Elliott, The San Diego Union-Tribune
