= Three Men and a Baby =

1987 film by Leonard Nimoy

- Theatrical release poster
- Directed by: Leonard Nimoy
- Screenplay by: Jim Cruickshank; James Orr
- Based on: Trois hommes et un couffin by Coline Serreau
- Produced by: Ted Field; Robert W. Cort
- Starring: Tom Selleck; Steve Guttenberg; Ted Danson
- Cinematography: Adam Greenberg
- Edited by: Michael A. Stevenson
- Music by: Marvin Hamlisch
- Production companies: Touchstone Pictures; Silver Screen Partners III; Interscope Communications
- Distributed by: Buena Vista Pictures Distribution
- Release date: November 25, 1987
- Running time: 102 minutes
- Country: United States
- Language: English
- Budget: $11–15 million
- Box office: $240 million

Three Men and a Baby is a 1987 American comedy film directed by Leonard Nimoy. It stars Tom Selleck, Steve Guttenberg, and Ted Danson as three bachelors who attempt to adapt their lives to de facto fatherhood with the arrival of the love child of one of the men. The film was based on a 1913 short story, "The Three Godfathers", by Peter B. Kyne, which was later adapted to the 1985 French film Three Men and a Cradle.

Three Men and a Baby was released by Buena Vista Pictures Distribution on November 25, 1987. The film was the biggest American box-office hit of 1987, surpassing Fatal Attraction and eventually grossing $167 million in the United States and Canada and $240 million worldwide. The film won the 1988 People's Choice Award for Favorite Comedy Motion Picture. A sequel, Three Men and a Little Lady (1990), also featured Selleck, Guttenberg and Danson. A remake was announced in 2020 for Disney+ with Zac Efron among the cast, though the film has yet to be made.

== Plot ==
Architect Peter Mitchell, cartoonist Michael Kellam, and actor Jack Holden are happy bachelors in their shared New York apartment, with frequent parties and flings. The film begins with Michael creating a series of murals within the vestibule to their apartment, while bringing various women up to their apartment. One day, a baby named Mary arrives on their doorstep with a note revealing she is the result of Jack's tryst with an actress named Sylvia during a Stratford Festival Shakespearean production a year prior.

Jack is in Turkey shooting a B movie, and makes arrangements with Paul Milner, a director and colleague, to have a package delivered to the apartment. Jack asks his roommates to keep the delivery a secret per his friend's wishes; when Mary arrives, they believe she is the "package".

Peter and Michael are totally befuddled on how to care for Mary, and Peter leaves to buy supplies. Their landlady, Mrs. Hathaway, delivers a small box – the actual "package" of heroin – which Michael tosses aside. At first they struggle to care for Mary but get the hang of childcare, including diaper changes, baths, and feedings. Peter tries to get help from his on–off girlfriend Rebecca, but she shows no interest. Taking care of her has even interfered in their daily work schedule.

Four days later, two drug dealers, Vince and Satch, arrive at the apartment for the package. Peter and Michael mistakenly give them Mary, along with a can of powdered milk the dealers believe is the heroin. Peter discovers the actual package; realizing the mix-up, he runs downstairs but trips, spilling the package's contents. He gathers up the drugs and confronts the men outside, causing a scuffle. A police officer on horseback intervenes; Peter rescues Mary, but the dealers flee with the can of powdered milk. The officer detains Peter and Michael at the apartment until Sgt. Melkowitz, a narcotics officer, arrives to question them. Jack calls from Turkey, but Peter and Michael are unable to talk openly as Melkowitz is listening in. They successfully hide the drugs, learning that Milner is a drug dealer. A suspicious Melkowitz puts them under surveillance.

Mrs. Hathaway babysits Mary while Peter and Michael go to work, unaware that the drug dealers are watching them. Returning home, they find Mrs. Hathaway bound and gagged and the apartment ransacked by the dealers, but Mary safe; a note threatens, "Next time we'll take the baby". Peter and Michael continue to care for Mary, adjusting to "fatherhood" and growing attached.

Peter incapacitates an intruder late at night, who turns out to be Jack, returning early after his movie role was cut. Jack assures Peter and Michael he knows nothing about the heroin or Milner's dealings. He initially denies his connection to Mary, but Sylvia's note convinces him he is Mary's father. Peter and Michael, now competent caregivers, are exhausted and frustrated from their around the clock babysitting, and pass all duties to a bewildered Jack, refusing to help him. Jack tries to get help from his mother, but she refuses him. After letting Jack suffer for a while, Michael and Peter help him, and together the three bachelors share babysitting duties. They even install a telephone in the shower after Peter and Michael fail to connect to Jack, in which they cut their date at the opera short.

Later, they receive a news clipping in the mail – Milner has been attacked by Vince and Satch and hospitalized – with another threat: "Don't let this happen to you!" Peter, Michael, and Jack formulate a plan to trap the dealers, arranging a meeting. Jack, disguised as a pregnant woman, leaves the building with Mary, while Peter and Michael leave in a cab, followed by undercover officers, but manage to lose them in another cab driven by Jack. Peter meets the dealers at the top floor of a construction site while Jack is manning the power breakers to the elevators and watching Mary. Michael, hidden in the vents, records Peter's conversation with the dealers but loses his balance and falls into the room, and a chase ensues. They manage to trap the dealers in an elevator as the police arrive. With the recording, they prove their innocence to Melkowitz, and the dealers are arrested.

Peter, Michael, and Jack fully embrace their role as Mary's guardians, until Sylvia arrives to take Mary with her to London. After she leaves with Mary, the three realize how desperately they miss the baby. Racing to the airport, they just miss Sylvia's plane for London. Hit with despair, they return home to find Sylvia and Mary inside their vestibule. Sylvia tearfully says she does not want to give up acting but must if she has to raise Mary alone. They invite her and Mary to move in; she graciously accepts, and the four live happily with the baby. They even add a new mural to their front entrance with the four pushing a stroller with Mary in it.

== Cast ==
- Tom Selleck as Peter Mitchell, one of the three roommates, an architect and the center figure of the trio
- Steve Guttenberg as Michael Kellam, the youngest of the three roommates and a cartoonist
- Ted Danson as Jack Holden, one of the three roommates, a skilled actor and Mary's birth father
- Margaret Colin as Rebecca, Peter's old flame
- Celeste Holm as Mrs. Holden, Jack's mother
- Nancy Travis as Sylvia Bennington, Mary's mother, an actress with whom Jack had a fling
- Philip Bosco as Sgt. Melkowitz, an NYPD narcotics detective
- Paul Guilfoyle as Vince, a drug dealer whom Milner had dealings with
- Cynthia Harris as Mrs. Hathaway, the landlady of the apartment complex the three men reside in
- Michelle and Lisa Blair as Mary, the baby and Jack's illegitimate daughter
- Alexandra Amini as Patty
- Peter Brown as Store Clerk
- Francine Beers as Woman at Gift Shop
- John Gould Rubin as Paul Milner, a TV commercial director and Jack's friend who is also a drug dealer
- Earl Hindman as Satch, Vince's enforcer
- Barbara Budd as Actress
- Michael Burgess as Man at Party
- Claire Cellucci as Angelyne
- Eugene Clark as Man #2 at Party
- Derek de Lint as Jan Clopatz, Rebecca's new beau and a concert cellist
- Dave Foley as Grocery Store Clerk
- Jackie Richardson as Edna
- Colin Quinn as Gift Shop Clerk
- Mario Joyner as taxi driver

== Urban legend ==
Shots from the film showing what some believe are a rifle and a young boy.

During the scene in which Jack and his mother are walking through the home with Mary, a black silhouette that resembles a rifle can be seen in a window. Forty seconds later, as they pass the window again, a human figure can be seen standing behind the curtains. In August 1990, shortly before the release of Three Men and a Little Lady, a rumor began circulating that the figure was the ghost of a boy who had once lived in the house used for filming. Most versions of the rumor claim that the boy died by shooting himself with a rifle, after which his grieving parents abandoned the house.

Danson's character standing next to a cardboard cutout of himself.

The figure is actually a cardboard standee of Jack dressed in a tuxedo and top hat that had been left on the set. It reappears later when Jack stands beside it as Sylvia comes to reclaim Mary. The prop was created for a subplot in which Jack appears in a dog food commercial, but this was cut from the final version of the film. Additionally, all of the indoor scenes in the film were not shot in a house, but on a Toronto sound stage.

== Reception ==
=== Critical response ===
The critical response to Three Men and a Baby was generally positive. On Rotten Tomatoes, the film holds an approval rating of 67% based on reviews from 70 critics, and an average rating of 5.9/10. The site's consensus reads: "Like the French farce it's based on, Three Men and a Baby is too self-satisfied with scatalogical humor to qualify as a bundle of joy, but the role of makeshift daddy brings out the best in Tom Selleck". Metacritic gave the film a score of 61 based on 16 reviews, indicating "generally favorable reviews". Audiences polled by CinemaScore gave the film an average grade of "A−" on an A+ to F scale.

Roger Ebert of the Chicago Sun-Times, despite noting several aspects he saw as flaws, praised the film, remarking: "Because of Selleck and his co-stars... the movie becomes a heartwarming entertainment". He gave it three out of four stars. Janet Maslin of The New York Times wrote "this story is about four babies, not just one" and "the film bubbles along in a funny if predictable way, with a lot more gags than the earlier film managed".

=== Box office ===
The film opened in theaters on Wednesday, November 25, 1987. It grossed $168 million in the United States and Canada and $72 million internationally for a worldwide gross of $240 million. It was notable for the Walt Disney Studios since it was the first production from the studio to gross more than $100 million domestically in its initial run and its highest-grossing film at the time until surpassed in 1990 by Pretty Woman.

On home video, it sold 535,000 units in the United States, a then record for a videocassette priced at $89.95 (equivalent to $244.87 in 2025).

== Legacy ==
The film was followed by a 1990 sequel titled Three Men and a Little Lady, which also featured Selleck, Guttenberg, and Danson. Guttenberg spoke about the two films in 2023, saying he felt the first was the stronger of the two films.

In 2010, Selleck said Disney had spoken to him about a potential third film tentatively titled Three Men and a Bride. Selleck later mentioned in 2013 that the third film "seemed to be real, and then it disappeared." while a Disney spokesman said that a new Three Men and a Baby entry was in development as of 2013.

A remake was announced in 2020 for the Disney+ streaming service with Zac Efron set to be in the cast. Maurice "Mo" Marable was chosen to direct the reboot in January 2021. Marable stated than when "you go back and you watch the original Three Men and a Baby you go, 'times have changed.'" Marable continued that "guys are not as stupid as they were back in the day. The cast will be very diverse; that's the only way I would do it. As of 2023, Marable was still set to direct the remake as his first feature film.

When asked about a reboot of the series, Guttenberg responded that he was not excited about it, saying that the audiences would prefer a sequel as they wanted to be reminded of a "better time. When you see a sequel, it reminds you what happened before. And you can come back to that."

=== Adaptations ===
The television show Baby Daddy, an American sitcom that premiered in 2012 on ABC Family, has been compared to the film.

== See also ==
- The Three Godfathers (short story) – 1913 short story by Peter B. Kyne
- My Two Dads – American sitcom (1987–1990)
