= The Gun in Betty Lou's Handbag =

1992 film by Allan Moyle

- Directed by: Allan Moyle
- Written by: Grace Cary Bickley
- Produced by: Scott Kroopf
- Starring: Penelope Ann Miller; Eric Thal; William Forsythe; Cathy Moriarty; Alfre Woodard
- Cinematography: Charles Minsky
- Edited by: Janice Hampton; Erica Huggins
- Music by: Richard Gibbs
- Production companies: Touchstone Pictures; Interscope Communications; Nomura Babcock & Brown
- Distributed by: Buena Vista Pictures Distribution
- Release date: August 21, 1992
- Running time: 89 minutes
- Country: United States
- Language: English
- Box office: $3.7 million

The Gun in Betty Lou's Handbag is a 1992 American screwball comedy film directed by Allan Moyle and produced by Scott Kroopf. It stars Penelope Ann Miller, Eric Thal, William Forsythe, Cathy Moriarty and Alfre Woodard. Rock and roll recording pioneer Cordell Jackson played a bit part as "Bathroom Woman".

The film was distributed by Touchstone Pictures for Interscope Communications.

== Plot ==
Betty Lou Perkins is a meek librarian in New Orleans who is ignored by everyone, including her uninspiring police detective husband Alex. A criminal kingpin is killed in cold blood, and Betty Lou finds the murder gun. She goes to the police station to tell them about the gun, but no one listens to her until she actually fires the weapon at a trash can in the bathroom. However, when the other characters (including Alex) don't know she can hear them, they all agree that she is innocent because she's too boring and timid to ever do anything at all, let alone anything wrong. A fed-up Betty tells them she killed the guy and gets arrested to their complete shock.

Behind bars, Betty Lou meets a variety of hardened and colorful characters. Rather than intimidate her, they actually increase her self-confidence. Once she is released, she begins to dress, speak, and act differently. Unfortunately for her, mob-connected acquaintances of the victim assume she must have confessed to the murder for a reason. They conclude she must be his mistress, and soon, the bad guys want a few words with her ... or worse. Meanwhile, Alex very slowly realizes he's been a worthless husband and that there's a real threat to his wife unless he can stop the bad guys.

== Cast ==
- Penelope Ann Miller as Betty Lou Perkins
- Eric Thal as Alex Perkins
- Julianne Moore as Elinor
- William Forsythe as Billy Beaudeen
- Alfre Woodard as Ann Orkin
- Cathy Moriarty as Reba Bush
- Xander Berkeley as Mr. Marchat
- Ray McKinnon as Frank Finch
- Andy Romano as Shelby Herrick
- Faye Grant as Charleen Barnes
- Michael O'Neill as Jergens
- Marian Seldes as Margaret Armstrong
- Meat Loaf as Lawrence
- Catherine Keener as Suzanne
- Stanley Tucci as Amos Lansing (uncredited)
- Mark Magill as Glenn

== Reception ==
The Gun in Betty Lou's Handbag received generally negative reviews from critics. It holds a 14% rating on Rotten Tomatoes, based on 23 reviews.

Entertainment Weekly, reviewing the film when it was released in home video, gave the film a D+, and called it a "foolish farce". The British film magazine Empire gave it three stars out of five, calling it "watchable" and noting that "Miller is a winning heroine", but characterizing the film as "too busy to be really funny". The Austin Chronicle gave it two stars: "The cast shines in The Gun in Betty Lou's Handbag; watching these performers, you know this movie would have made for an inspired farce, given better writing and direction."

== Home media ==
The film was released on DVD by Touchstone Home Entertainment on September 2, 2003, and on Blu-ray by Mill Creek Entertainment in May 2011.
