= Snow White: A Tale of Terror =

1997 Gothic horror film by Michael Cohn

- Promotional poster with the film's earlier title
- Also known as: Snow White in the Black Forest; The Grimm Brothers' Snow White
- Based on: "Snow White" by the Brothers Grimm
- Screenplay by: Tom Szollosi; Deborah Serra
- Directed by: Michael Cohn
- Starring: Sigourney Weaver; Sam Neill; Gil Bellows; Monica Keena
- Music by: John Ottman
- Country of origin: United States
- Original language: English

Production
- Producer: Tom Engelman
- Cinematography: Mike Southon
- Editor: Ian Crafford
- Running time: 100 minutes
- Production companies: PolyGram Filmed Entertainment; Interscope Communications
- Budget: $26–30 million

Original release
- Network: Showtime
- Release: August 24, 1997

Snow White: A Tale of Terror (Note: Alternatively titled Snow White in the Black Forest and The Grimm Brothers' Snow White.) is a 1997 American Gothic horror film directed by Michael Cohn from a screenplay by Tom Szollosi and Deborah Serra. Co-produced by PolyGram Filmed Entertainment and Interscope Communications, it is based on the 1812 fairy tale by the Brothers Grimm, and stars Sigourney Weaver, Sam Neill, Gil Bellows, and Monica Keena. Set in the 15th century Germany, the film follows Lilli Hoffman (Keena), a young noblewoman forced to flee her home into the woods and seek refuge with a group of outcasts to escape her stepmother Claudia (Weaver), who blames Lilli for her miscarriage and wants to kill her.

Originally titled The Grimm Brothers: Snow White in the Black Forest, the film began development in 1993, after producer Tom Engelman successfully proposed the project to PolyGram. Several screenwriters spent three years working on the story, which was conceived as a dark and elaborate take on the Grimm's tale. Michael Cohn was appointed director of the film, which became his first big-budget production. Principal photography took place at Barrandov Studios in Prague and several other locations throughout the Czech Republic, starting in October 1995 and continuing into 1996.

Originally intended for a theatrical release, the film made its premiere as a television production retitled Snow White: A Tale of Terror on Showtime on August 24, 1997. It received mixed reviews from critics and was nominated for Outstanding Lead Actress (Weaver), Outstanding Costume Design, and Outstanding Makeup at the 50th Primetime Emmy Awards.

== Plot ==
In 1493 Germany, Baron Frederick Hoffman and his pregnant wife Lilliana are driving home through the woods when their carriage is attacked by wolves, and Lilliana is mortally wounded. Frederick is forced to perform a caesarean section on her in order to save their unborn daughter, whom he names Lilliana (Lilli for short) in honor of his deceased wife. Seven years later, Frederick remarries, taking to wife the French noblewoman Claudia Alvise, who arrives at his residence with her mute brother Gustav and an ornate vanity that belonged to their mother. Despite Claudia's attempts to win her over, Lilli refuses to accept her stepmother, mourning her birth mother and envying Frederick's attention to Claudia. On the Hoffmans' wedding night, Lilli witnesses her nanny being killed by a force emanating from Claudia's vanity mirror, which further strains her relationship with her stepmother.

Nine years later, a teenaged Lilli starts a relationship with a young doctor, Peter Gutenberg, and dreams of leaving home, while Claudia expects her first child. The Hoffmans throw a party, and Lilli arrives dressed in her mother's ballgown, taking Frederick's attention away from Claudia. Hurt and jealous, Claudia goes into premature labor, and her baby is stillborn, while she is rendered unable to conceive another one. The spirit from Claudia's mirror (in the form of her beautiful reflection) consoles her, blaming Lilli for her misfortunes. The next day, Lilli remorsefully apologizes to Claudia, but the latter decides to take revenge on her.

Several weeks later, Claudia sends Gustav to kill Lilli, and the latter is forced to flee into the woods. Gustav brings his sister a boar's heart instead of Lilli's, but the mirror reveals the deception, and Claudia drives him to suicide by bewitching him with hallucinations. Frederick goes in search of his daughter, but gets injured and is forced to return home. In the woods, Lilli comes across an abandoned abbey, where she encounters a band of seven societal outcasts; one of them (Rolf) offers to get a ransom for Lilli and tries to rape her, but their leader (Will) banishes him.

Lost and frightened, Lilli follows the group into the mine. Claudia tries to kill her stepdaughter by causing a cave-in, but Lilli and the outcasts manage to survive, although one of them (Gilbert) is buried alive. Despite the initial mutual antagonism, Lilli warms up to Will after learning that he lost his family due to his refusal to fight for the Crusaders. The next day, Claudia tries to kill Lilli again by knocking down trees with witchcraft, but the latter is able to escape, although another outcast (Lars) is killed in the process. That night, Lilli and Will share a kiss, realizing their feelings for each other.

Meanwhile, Claudia rapes Frederick to take his sperm for the ritual resurrection of their stillborn child, and turns Gustav's eviscerated heart into an apple. Disguised as an old crone, Claudia tracks down Lilli the next day and tricks her into eating the apple, plunging her into a death-like trance. Peter arrives shortly after and pronounces Lilli dead, but before the outcasts can bury her, Will revives her by dislodging a piece of apple from her throat. Together with Will and Peter, Lilli returns home, finding the entire household in a senseless and hostile state caused by Claudia's witchcraft.

Claudia forcibly takes Frederick to the chapel and prepares to exsanguinate him to complete the ritual. Lilli and Will find a weakened Frederick and take him to safety, while Claudia kills Peter by pushing him out of the window. Lilli finds Claudia cradling her revived baby and confronts her, setting the room on fire in the ensuing battle. Lilli breaks the mirror with a dagger, wounding Claudia, who is further injured by the shards and the spreading fire, before she and her child are crushed by the debris. With Claudia gone, her witchcraft dissipates, and Lilli reunites with her father and Will.

== Cast ==
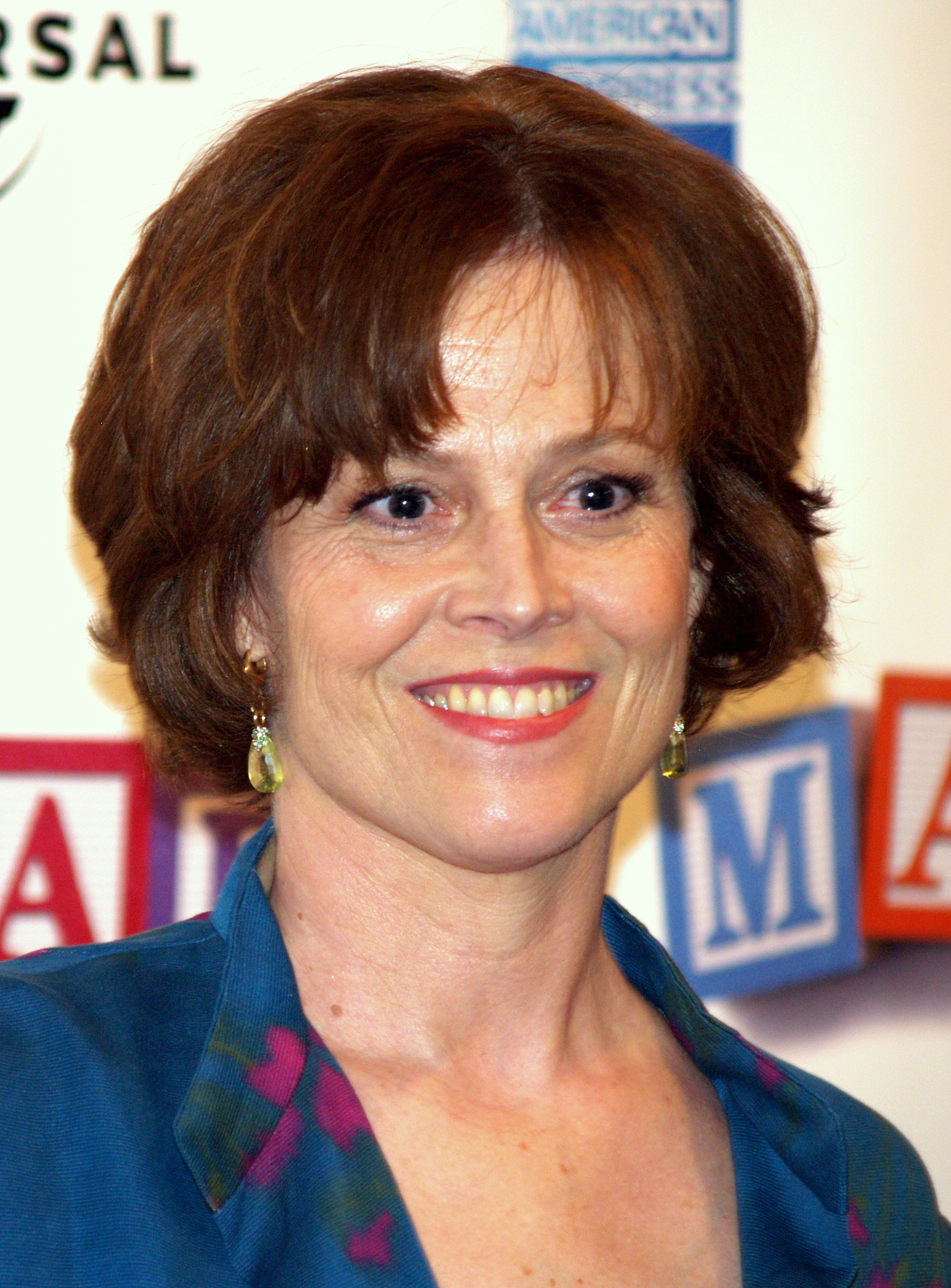
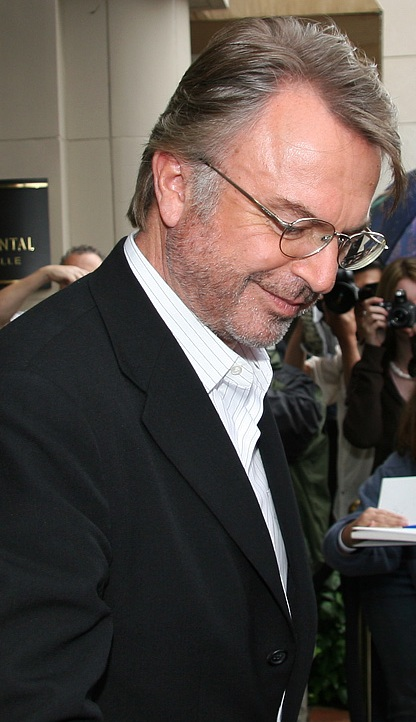
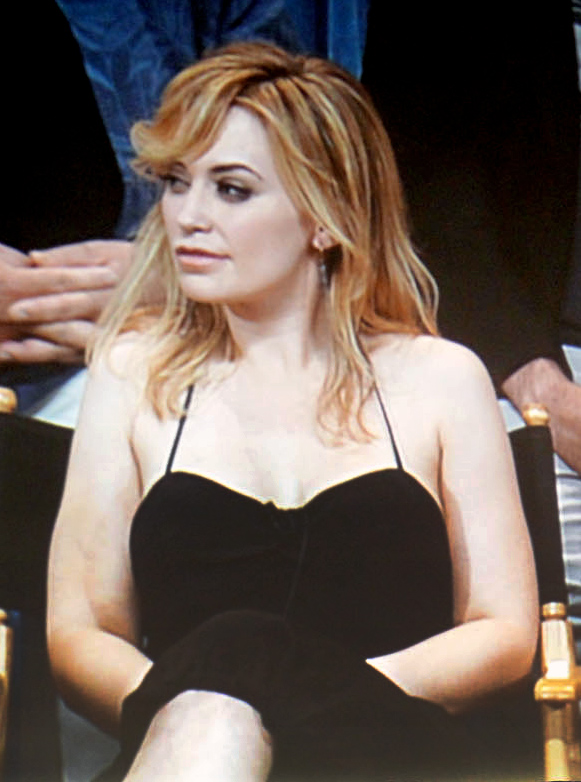
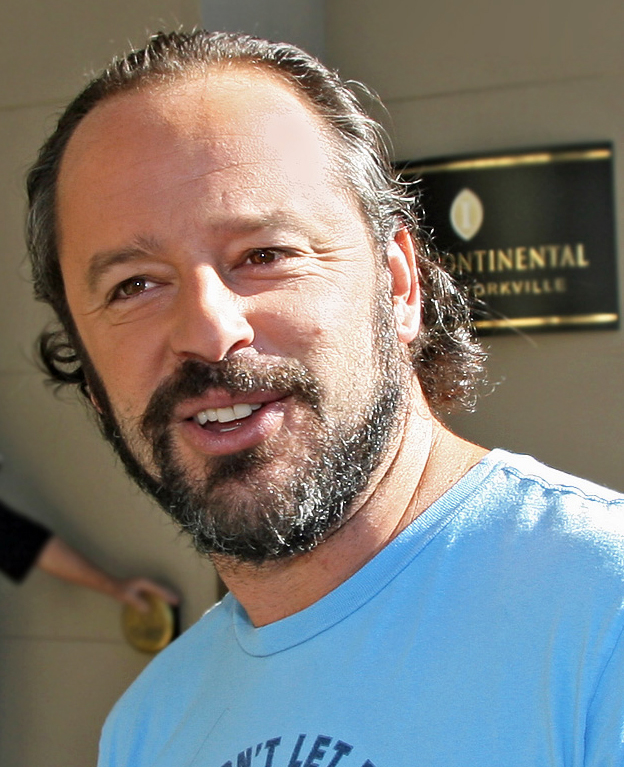
Top row: Sigourney Weaver (left) and Sam Neill (right) (both pictured in 2008) play Claudia and Frederick.
Bottom row: Monica Keena (left, pictured in 2011) and Gil Bellows (right, pictured in 2008) play Lilli and Will.
- Sigourney Weaver as Lady Claudia Hoffman (née Alvise), Frederick's narcissistic second wife and Lilli's stepmother, who seeks to destroy her stepdaughter after suffering a miscarriage, gradually descending into madness. Weaver described her character as "an impeccable woman—she's French, she's very beautiful, she's very seductive and she loves her husband very much. When she feels she loses him to [Lilli], she just goes berserk… Claudia's just a great character. She's diabolic. The wicked part of her is just delicious to play."
  - Weaver also plays the Mirror, a manipulative spirit that acts as Claudia's confidant and manifests itself in her reflection. The film's director Michael Cohn commented that the mirror "could be a fragment of [Claudia's] own psyche, her id, or even some vestige of her own mother. There are implications that the vanity is a talisman willed to her so the spirit of her mother can always be close by."
  - Karen Hart provided Claudia's singing voice.
- Sam Neill as Baron Frederick Hoffman, Lilli's widowed father and Claudia's husband, who desperately wants his family to be united. Commenting on the character, Weaver said that "it all hinges on Frederick. [Claudia and Lilli] both wanted Frederick, to be first in his heart. And when [Claudia] saw that she couldn't be because she'd lost the heir, the son, she just crumbled. It meant everything to her to have his love."
- Monica Keena as Lilliana "Lilli" Hoffman, Frederick's 16-year-old daughter and Claudia's stepdaughter, who forms a rivalry with her stepmother. Keena described her character as "pretty spunky, and she's sensitive and she's open to learn a lot of things just like anyone else growing up in the world." Producer Tom Engelman elaborated that Lilli is not "a naive individual who doesn't even think twice about taking a bite from an apple offered to her by a complete stranger. She's smarter than that. One of the reasons Claudia doesn't like her is because Lilli hasn't even tried to make an effort [to trust her]."
  - Taryn Davis as 7-year-old Lilli

Gil Bellows plays Will, the dashing leader of a band of outcasts, who antagonizes Lilli before becoming her protector and love interest. Other outcasts are portrayed by Brian Glover (Lars), Anthony Brophy (Rolf), Christopher Bauer (Konrad), John Edward Allen (Bart), Andrew Tiernan (Scar), and Bryan Pringle (Father Gilbert). David Conrad plays Peter Gutenberg, Lilli's doctor suitor. Frances Cuka plays Nannau, Lilli's devoted nanny. Miroslav Táborský plays Gustav, Claudia's mute brother. Dale Wyatt plays Ilsa, Lilli's maidservant and best friend. Joanna Roth plays Lady Lilliana Hoffman, Frederick's first wife and Lilli's birth mother.

== Production ==
=== Development and writing ===
I was reading the Grimm tale to my young niece, and as I was reading, I felt this sudden rush of discovery. Here was an untouched—at least by filmmakers—malevolent rollercoaster ride dealing with a young girl surviving a tough ordeal and emerging from it as a strong and determined woman. Not only that. In the course of her brutal experiences she's forced to descend into her own private Hell (the spell cast by the Queen) and must face her psychological confusion and some terrifying personal demons… We were telling the real behind-the-scenes story from which a potent myth would soon arise. Although it's only seven pages long, [the tale] is imbued with poetry and mythic language, and I wanted that captured. I insisted each image be analyzed for what lay behind it, too.

— Tom Engelman, on coming up with the idea of The Grimm Brothers: Snow White in the Black Forest

In 1993, producer Tom Engelman approached PolyGram Filmed Entertainment with the idea of a film adaptation of the Brothers Grimm's 1812 fairy tale "Snow White"; he came up with the project after reading the tale to his niece, deciding to develop a complex coming-of-age story that would be more faithful in tone to the source material than Walt Disney's landmark animated feature film Snow White and the Seven Dwarfs (1937). The studio greenlit the project and allocated $30 million (equivalent to $60,167,910 in 2025) for its production. Engelman envisioned his take on the tale as a dark and expanded version of it, with psychologically elaborated characters and the addition of historical context. Tom Szollosi penned the initial screenplay, which underwent a number of changes over the next three years with the input of several other writers, including Deborah Serra and Stephen Metcalfe. An early version of the story was reportedly set in New York City and had the dwarfs reimagined as gang members. The screenwriters eventually decided to set the film (which was titled The Grimm Brothers: Snow White in the Black Forest) in the late 15th-century Germany, renaming the titular character Lilli and portraying her family as landowners rather than royalty to better match the setting. Unlike most previous versions of Snow White (including the Disney one), Lilli was developed as a less naive and more proactive character, with her own dislike of her stepmother becoming one of the catalysts for their conflict.

For the evil queen (who had been named Claudia), the filmmakers took a more complex approach, developing her as a three-dimensional character and writing the story from her point of view. Although the screenwriters retained Claudia's obsession with beauty, they decided that she would not start as a villain or resent Lilli out of jealousy of her appearance, as in the Grimms' tale; instead, it was written that Claudia would sincerely fall in love with Lilli's father (who had been named Frederick) and try to bond with her, despite Lilli rejecting Claudia and fighting with her for Frederick's attention. After years of trying to conceive a child, Claudia would have a miscarriage, resulting in her becoming mad and blaming Lilli for her misfortunes, with the spirit from her mother's mirror fueling Claudia's hatred for her stepdaughter. In order to "keep the psychological readings complex", the screenwriters decided to make it ambiguous whether the mirror spirit was a hallucination of Claudia caused by her increasing insanity, or a supernatural entity manipulating her. Although the script explicitly stated that Claudia's mother practiced witchcraft, this was eventually omitted.

In a major departure from the Grimm's tale, the dwarfs were rewritten as a band of social rejects (named Outcasts), which the screenwriters based on the titular gang from The Wild Bunch (1969). According to Engelman, the decision was made "not through political correctness gone mad, but because in our minds these characters would be more incomplete men in some shape and form. We didn't want to define them all as physical dwarfs." The group included Will, its branded leader who would fall in love with Lilli; Rolf, a molester who would turn on the band; Bart, the only actual dwarf kept in the story; Father Gilbert, an excommunicated priest; Scar, a man with a face disfigured by childhood trauma; Pock (renamed Lars in the final film), blind in one eye and mutilated; and a heavily-built Konrad. Several other story additions included a love triangle between Will, Lilli, and her other suitor, Peter Gutenberg (who was based on the prince); Claudia's enigmatic brother Gustav; and a number of gruesome or intense sequences, such as the opening scene in which Frederick cuts the unborn Lilli out of his dying first wife's womb after a carriage accident, and the final confrontation between Lilli and Claudia in a chamber with mirror.

More than 30 directors had been approached to helm the project before Michael Cohn landed the job. Cohn initially tried to pitch a script for a potential HBO project to PolyGram's subsidiary, Interscope Communications, whose representatives offered him to work on The Grimm Brothers: Snow White in the Black Forest, and he signed on to direct the film after several more discussions with them over the next eight weeks. The Grimm Brothers: Snow White in the Black Forest was the first high-budget production for Cohn, who had previously worked on two direct-to-video films, Interceptor (1992) and When the Bough Breaks (1994). Engelman stated that Cohn "fully embraced the dark philosophy of the piece. I didn't want a technology-driven movie at the expense of character and Michael's past two films proved he knew how to build suspense, how to handle special effects and let the actors work in a natural vein… We took a leap of faith."

=== Casting ===
Who else would have been the perfect Claudia? Sigourney has fought Aliens and Ghostbusters, for heaven's sake! Rarely have I ever had an actress so firmly in mind from the very beginning. It was a case of, if I can't make this with Sigourney, then it isn't worth making at all. Only she could bring a level of evil intensity to Claudia without sacrificing her humanity or intelligence. Claudia was the hero of her own story and she had to be real and be played straight.

— Tom Engelman, on casting Sigourney Weaver as Claudia

Sigourney Weaver, who had collaborated with Tom Engelman on Working Girl (1988), was the only choice to play Claudia. Weaver showed interest in the project after executive producer Robert W. Cort first approached her in 1993 (during the early stages of its development), eventually becoming attracted to the role because of the opportunity to play a more dimensional and sympathetic version of the evil queen. According to Weaver, she was intrigued by the idea of "why a woman with so much to give, and so many excellent qualities, would suddenly feel worthless in one day… When women look in the mirror, if they feel good about themselves, then they look pretty. But if they feel they are unable to give love or are unhappy, then they feel neutered as women. Here was a great opportunity to explore all that in the 'Mirror, Mirror, On the Wall' idea, time to investigate it both as a woman and an actress." Weaver was partially involved in the development of Claudia, changing or removing parts of the script that she felt did not suit the character. PolyGram paid Weaver $4 million (equivalent to $8,022,388 in 2025) for her performance.

About 200 European and American actresses were auditioned for the role of Lilli, and Alicia Silverstone was the major contender for a while. Monica Keena, whose only acting credit at the time was While You Were Sleeping (1995), was revealed to have been cast in September 1995. Commenting on the choice of Keena, Engelman said that she "had the face of a Botticelli angel but also a level of toughness that would be requisite for a girl from this time period… You know she'd cope and survive to become strong enough to take on [Claudia]." David Conrad was offered to play Peter Gutenberg in his final year of the graduate theater program at the Juilliard School, which he had to drop out to accept the role. Other main cast members included Sam Neill as Frederick, Taryn Davis as the younger Lilli, and Gil Bellows as Will.

=== Filming ===
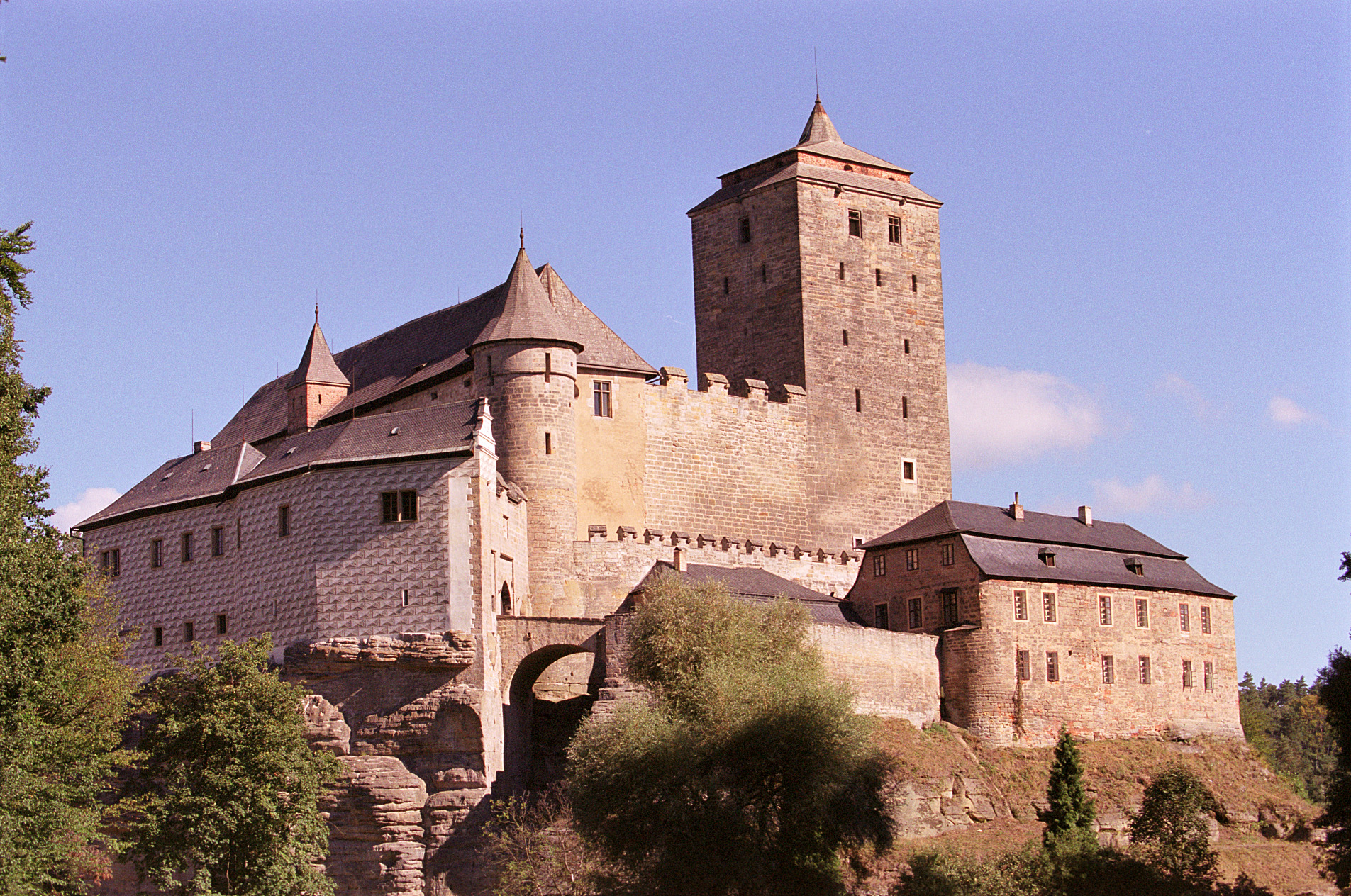
Kost Castle in the Czech Republic served as the exterior of the Hoffman residence.

Principal photography on the film (which by then had been retitled Snow White in the Black Forest) began on October 2, 1995, taking place at Barrandov Studios in Prague and other locations throughout the Czech Republic. The producers considered six other Eastern European countries to shoot the film in before settling on the Czech Republic; according to Tom Engelman, it was chosen because it had a "stark, gothic, brutal feeling" that they could not find anywhere else. Several castles across the country were used as filming locations, including Pernštejn, Kost, Dobřichovice, and the ruins of Valdek. The forest scenes were shot in the woods of Jevany and Stromovka Park in Prague. Filming ended in December 1995, but reportedly continued in May 1996; by then, the film had been retitled The Grimm Brothers' Snow White. The film was completed later in 1996.

=== Design and visual effects ===
Gemma Jackson was the production designer for The Grimm Brothers' Snow White; her set designs were influenced by Gothic architecture, particularly castles she visited in France, England, and Germany. The visual effects for the film were handled by Fantasy II Film Effects under the supervision of Gene Warren Jr. and Ernest D. Farino.

== Music ==
Snow White (A Tale Of Terror) (Original Motion Picture Soundtrack)

Film score by John Ottman
- Released: March 10, 1998
- Genre: Orchestral
- Length: 59:55
- Label: Citadel Records

John Ottman chronology
| The Cable Guy (1996) | Snow White: A Tale of Terror (1997) | Incognito (1997) |

The film score for Snow White: A Tale of Terror was written and composed by John Ottman.

=== Track listing ===
All music is composed by John Ottman.

| No. | Title | Length |
|---|---|---|
| 1. | "Main Theme" | 3:06 |
| 2. | "Claudia Arrives" | 2:59 |
| 3. | "Lilly's Birth" | 3:07 |
| 4. | "The Apple" | 5:17 |
| 5. | "The Dress" | 0:45 |
| 6. | "Freaks Of Nature" | 4:33 |
| 7. | "Mirror, Mirror" | 3:33 |
| 8. | "The Awakening" | 2:38 |
| 9. | "Traitor" | 2:31 |
| 10. | "Company For Christ" | 2:23 |
| 11. | "The Celebration" | 2:48 |
| 12. | "Fatal Glance" | 2:01 |
| 13. | "The Locket" | 0:25 |
| 14. | "Seduction / About Will" | 4:47 |
| 15. | "The Spell" | 1:16 |
| 16. | "She Lurks" | 2:51 |
| 17. | "Reflections" | 2:00 |
| 18. | "The Outcasts" | 2:01 |
| 19. | "Claudia's Lair" | 4:10 |
| 20. | "Taking The Seed" | 1:52 |
| 21. | "What Have You Done To Me!" | 2:53 |
| 22. | "Resolution" | 1:51 |
| Total length: | | 59:55 |

== Broadcast ==
The film was originally planned for a theatrical release, but it was unable to secure a satisfactory deal with a distributor in the United States. Snow White: A Tale of Terror premiered on Showtime on August 24, 1997. The film was released theatrically in the United Kingdom and grossed $3 million (equivalent to $6,016,791 in 2025).

=== Home media ===
Snow White: A Tale of Terror was first released on VHS via PolyGram on November 25, 1997. It was re-issued on DVD from Universal Home Entertainment on August 13, 2002, containing identical artwork to the previous edition and most recently on May 1, 2012 from Universal, containing newly commissioned artwork. A multipack DVD including the film (with Darkman II: The Return of Durant and Firestarter 2: Rekindled) was made available from Universal.

In the United Kingdom, Universal Home Entertainment released the film on VHS format on June 1, 1998, while a re-issued VHS became available via Universal from September 17, 2001. The film has been issued twice on DVD from Universal Home Entertainment in the UK, with the first on February 6, 2006, and a subsequent version containing new artwork on May 14, 2012. All editions from Universal are now out-of-print as distribution company Fabulous Films currently acquire ownership rights for distribution in the United Kingdom. Fabulous released the film on April 4, 2016 on DVD, and for the first time in any country, on Blu-ray format on July 4, 2016.

The film is additionally available to rent or buy on Amazon Video.

The film finally debuted on Blu-ray in the United States for the first time on October 6, 2020 by Mill Creek Entertainment. The disc contains no special features.

== Reception ==
=== Critical response ===
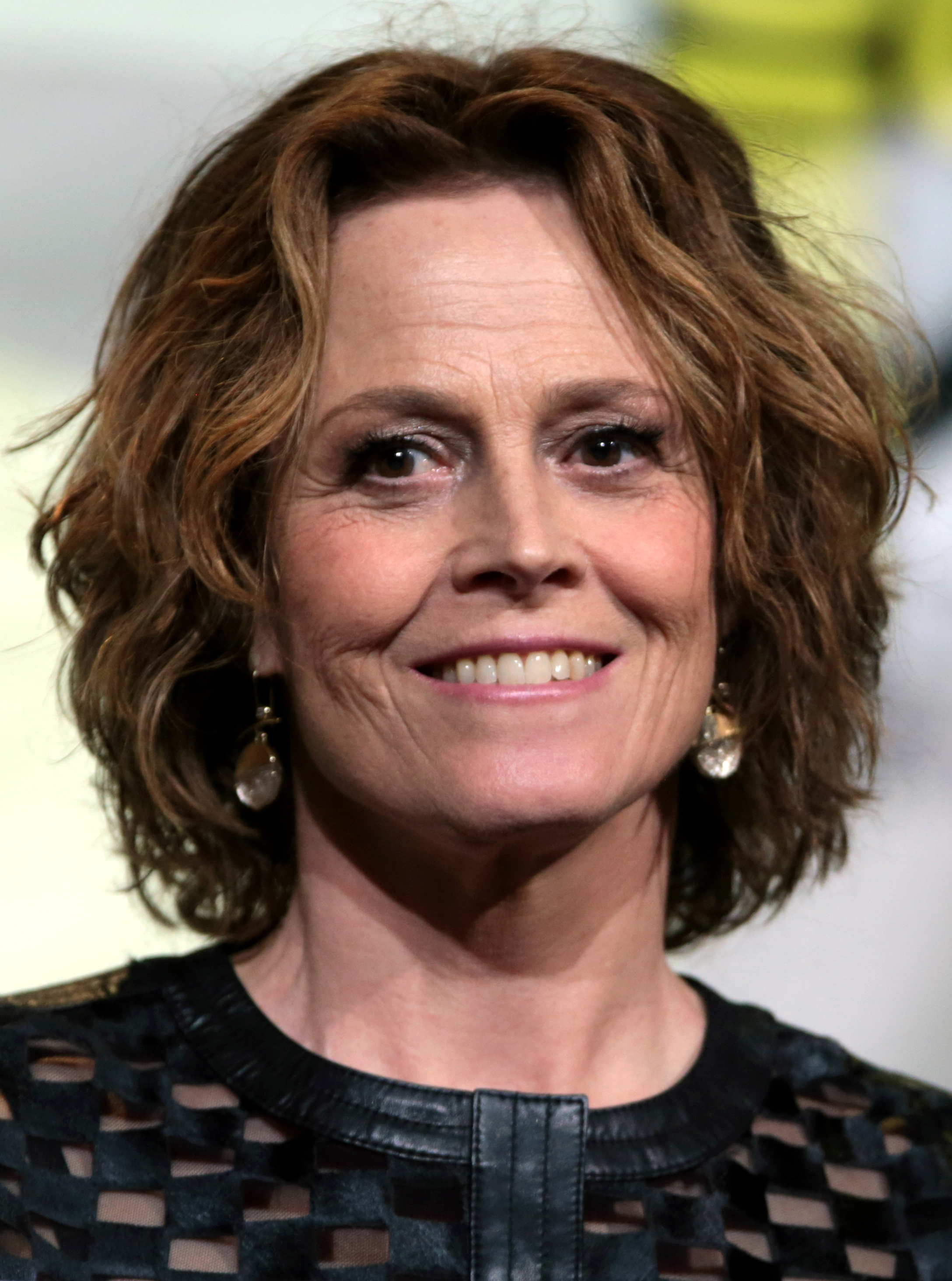
Sigourney Weaver was widely praised for her performance as Claudia.

The review aggregator website Rotten Tomatoes reported that Snow White: A Tale of Terror had a 58% approval rating based on 12 reviews, with an average rating of 5.9/10.

The New York Daily News described Snow White: A Tale of Terror as "intense and gruesome, although brilliant", and praised its use of locations in the Czech Republic, as well as the performances of the cast, particularly Weaver's. Anita Gates from The New York Times gave a positive review, highlighting Weaver's acting, costume design, and cinematography. TVGuide complimented the script, Michael Cohn's direction, and the performances, adding that the "quick pacing, excellent medieval costume design, top-flight makeup effects, and the beautiful locations in Prague and the Czech Republic also help to sharpen this slick effort." In his review for the Los Angeles Times, Howard Rosenberg called the film "delicious, at once fun and foreboding despite some plot gaps"; he also praised Weaver's acting, Cohn's direction, and the cinematography. William Thomas of Empire awarded Snow White: A Tale of Terror with three out of five stars, complimenting the performances of Weaver and Keena and stating that the film "succeeds by drawing deep, fearful uncertainty from its ambiguity."

Writing for Variety, Sheri Linden praised the cinematography and production design, but criticized the pacing and performances of the cast (with the exception of Weaver's), concluding that while it is "good to look at, this Snow White isn't the chilling experience it should be." Ty Burr from Entertainment Weekly gave the film a "D+", calling it a "lugubrious, overcooked mess that forgets fairy tales are meant to entertain as well as instruct." A Time Out reviewer wrote that Snow White: A Tale of Terror provides "insufficient atmosphere or developed characterisation to satisfy grown-ups. The film plays like light Hammer horror with inappropriate period finery and design." In his 2002 DVD review for The A.V. Club, Nathan Rabin criticized the film, but highlighted Weaver's acting, describing it as "easily the best thing about this muddled, confused and disappointing film." J. R. Southall from Starburst gave a strongly negative review, writing: "Thanks to an over-reliance on unconvincing ADR making most of the cast seem even more wooden than they would already be, badly chosen video effects and mid-1990s camerawork dating the project hideously, and what feels like television comedy pacing, this version of the Grimm Brothers' fairy tale – which attempts to retain the dark fairytale aspect while ditching much of the plot and spinning a new one instead – is ultimately unsuccessful, fatally undermined by its poor production choices in spite of an interesting cast and some bold ideas."

=== Accolades ===
| Award | Category | Recipient(s) | Result | Ref. |
|---|---|---|---|---|
| American Society of Cinematographers Award | Outstanding Achievement in Cinematography in a Movie of the Week or Pilot | Mike Southon | Nominated | |
| CableACE Awards | Cinematography in a Movie or Miniseries | Mike Southon | Nominated | |
| Primetime Emmy Awards | Outstanding Lead Actress in a Miniseries or Movie | Sigourney Weaver | Nominated | |
| Primetime Emmy Awards | Outstanding Costume Design for a Miniseries or a Special | Marit Allen, Charles Knode | Nominated | |
| Primetime Emmy Awards | Outstanding Makeup for a Miniseries, Movie or a Special | Ann Brodie, Linda de Vetta | Nominated | |
| Saturn Awards | Best Television Presentation | Snow White: A Tale of Terror | Nominated | |
| Screen Actors Guild Awards | Outstanding Performance by a Female Actor in a Miniseries or Television Movie | Sigourney Weaver | Nominated | |

== See also ==
- 1997 in film
- List of American films of 1997
- List of fantasy films of the 1990s
- List of films about witchcraft
- List of sword-and-sorcery films
- Snow White: A Deadly Summer
- Snow White and the Huntsman
- The Death of Snow White
