= List of Walt Disney Studios films (1990–1999) =

This is a list of films produced and distributed by the Walt Disney Studios, one of the Walt Disney Company's divisions and one of the "Big Five" major film studios. The list includes films produced or released by all existing, defunct, and sold labels or subsidiaries of the Walt Disney Studios during the 1990–1999 time period, which includes Walt Disney Pictures, Walt Disney Animation Studios, Pixar Animation Studios, Touchstone Pictures and Hollywood Pictures. All of these films were produced or financed by Disney.

This list does not include Miramax Films and Dimension Films titles as they were operated independently during Disney's ownership of Miramax. Films from Lucasfilm, Marvel Entertainment, and 20th Century Fox are completely excluded from this list as Disney wouldn't acquire their ownership until years later.

All films listed are theatrical releases by Buena Vista Pictures Distribution unless specified.

Release date	Title	Studio release label	Notes
February 2, 1990	Stella	Touchstone Pictures	U.K. and Irish home media and North American distribution only; The Samuel Goldwyn Company
February 23, 1990	Where the Heart Is	Touchstone Pictures	North American distribution only; Silver Screen Partners IV
March 23, 1990	Pretty Woman	Touchstone Pictures	Silver Screen Partners IV
April 6, 1990	Ernest Goes to Jail	Touchstone Pictures	Silver Screen Partners IV and Emshell Producers Group
April 27, 1990	Spaced Invaders	Touchstone Pictures	Smart Egg Pictures
May 25, 1990	Fire Birds	Touchstone Pictures	North American distribution only; Nova International Films
June 15, 1990	Dick Tracy	Touchstone Pictures	Silver Screen Partners IV and Mulholland Productions
June 22, 1990	Betsy's Wedding	Touchstone Pictures	Silver Screen Partners IV and Martin Bregman Productions
July 18, 1990	Arachnophobia	Hollywood Pictures	Amblin Entertainment and Tangled Web Productions
August 3, 1990	DuckTales the Movie: Treasure of the Lost Lamp	Walt Disney Pictures	Disney MovieToons, Walt Disney Television Animation and Walt Disney Animation France
August 17, 1990	Taking Care of Business	Hollywood Pictures	Silver Screen Partners IV
October 12, 1990	Mr. Destiny	Touchstone Pictures	Silver Screen Partners IV and Laurence Mark Productions
November 16, 1990	The Rescuers Down Under	Walt Disney Pictures	Walt Disney Feature Animation and Silver Screen Partners IV
November 21, 1990	Three Men and a Little Lady	Touchstone Pictures	Silver Screen Partners IV and Interscope Communications
December 23, 1990	Green Card	Touchstone Pictures	distribution outside France, Australia and New Zealand only; Silver Screen Partners IV and Umbrella Entertainment
January 18, 1991	White Fang	Walt Disney Pictures	Silver Screen Partners IV and Hybrid Productions Inc.
February 1, 1991	Run	Hollywood Pictures	
February 22, 1991	Scenes from a Mall	Touchstone Pictures	Silver Screen Partners IV
March 1, 1991	Shipwrecked	Walt Disney Pictures	distribution outside Scandinavia only; AB Svensk Filmindustri
April 5, 1991	The Marrying Man	Hollywood Pictures	Silver Screen Partners IV
April 26, 1991	Oscar	Touchstone Pictures	Silver Screen Partners IV
May 3, 1991	One Good Cop	Hollywood Pictures	
May 17, 1991	What About Bob?	Touchstone Pictures	Touchwood Pacific Partners
May 24, 1991	Wild Hearts Can't Be Broken	Walt Disney Pictures	Silver Screen Partners IV and Pegasus Entertainment
June 21, 1991	The Rocketeer	Walt Disney Pictures	Silver Screen Partners IV and The Gordon Company
July 24, 1991	The Doctor	Touchstone Pictures	Silver Screen Partners IV
July 26, 1991	V.I. Warshawski	Hollywood Pictures	Chestnut Hill Productions
August 3, 1991	True Identity	Touchstone Pictures	Sandollar Productions
September 18, 1991	Paradise	Touchstone Pictures	Touchwood Pacific Partners
September 27, 1991	Deceived	Touchstone Pictures	Asygarth Productions
October 11, 1991	Ernest Scared Stupid	Touchstone Pictures	Touchwood Pacific Partners and Emshell Producers Group
November 1, 1991	Billy Bathgate	Touchstone Pictures	
November 22, 1991	Beauty and the Beast	Walt Disney Pictures	Walt Disney Feature Animation and Silver Screen Partners IV
December 20, 1991	Father of the Bride	Touchstone Pictures	Sandollar Productions
January 10, 1992	The Hand That Rocks the Cradle	Hollywood Pictures	Interscope Communications and Nomura Babcock & Brown
February 7, 1992	Medicine Man	Hollywood Pictures	North and Latin American distribution only; Cinergi Pictures
March 6, 1992	Blame It on the Bellboy	Hollywood Pictures	Silver Screen Partners IV
March 20, 1992	Noises Off	Touchstone Pictures	Amblin Entertainment
April 3, 1992	Straight Talk	Hollywood Pictures	
April 10, 1992	Newsies	Walt Disney Pictures	Touchwood Pacific Partners
April 24, 1992	Passed Away	Hollywood Pictures	
May 22, 1992	Encino Man	Hollywood Pictures	Touchwood Pacific Partners
May 29, 1992	Sister Act	Touchstone Pictures	Touchwood Pacific Partners
July 17, 1992	Honey, I Blew Up the Kid	Walt Disney Pictures	Touchwood Pacific Partners
July 17, 1992	A Stranger Among Us	Hollywood Pictures	Touchwood Pacific Partners, Propaganda Films, and Sandollar Productions
August 7, 1992	3 Ninjas	Touchstone Pictures	North American distribution only
August 21, 1992	The Gun in Betty Lou's Handbag	Touchstone Pictures	Interscope Communications and Nomura Babcock & Brown
September 11, 1992	Crossing the Bridge	Touchstone Pictures	
September 18, 1992	Captain Ron	Touchstone Pictures	Touchwood Pacific Partners
September 18, 1992	Sarafina!	Hollywood Pictures	North American distribution only; Miramax Films
October 2, 1992	The Mighty Ducks	Walt Disney Pictures	Avnet–Kerner Productions
October 16, 1992	Consenting Adults	Hollywood Pictures	Touchwood Pacific Partners
November 25, 1992	Aladdin	Walt Disney Pictures	Walt Disney Feature Animation
December 4, 1992	The Distinguished Gentleman	Hollywood Pictures	Touchwood Pacific Partners and Eddie Murphy Productions
December 11, 1992	The Muppet Christmas Carol	Walt Disney Pictures	Jim Henson Productions
January 15, 1993	Alive	Touchstone Pictures	North American distribution only; Paramount Pictures and The Kennedy/Marshall Company
January 22, 1993	Aspen Extreme	Hollywood Pictures	
February 3, 1993	Homeward Bound: The Incredible Journey	Walt Disney Pictures	Touchwood Pacific Partners
February 3, 1993	The Cemetery Club	Touchstone Pictures	
March 5, 1993	Swing Kids	Hollywood Pictures	Touchwood Pacific Partners
March 12, 1993	A Far Off Place	Walt Disney Pictures	Amblin Entertainment and Touchwood Pacific Partners
March 26, 1993	Born Yesterday	Hollywood Pictures	Touchwood Pacific Partners
April 2, 1993	The Adventures of Huck Finn	Walt Disney Pictures	
April 16, 1993	Blood In Blood Out	Hollywood Pictures	
April 23, 1993	Indian Summer	Touchstone Pictures	Outlaw Productions
May 28, 1993	Super Mario Bros.	Hollywood Pictures	North and Latin American distribution only; Lightmotive, Allied Filmmakers and Cinergi Pictures
June 4, 1993	Guilty as Sin	Hollywood Pictures	
June 4, 1993	Life with Mikey	Touchstone Pictures	
June 9, 1993	What's Love Got to Do with It	Touchstone Pictures	
July 2, 1993	Son in Law	Hollywood Pictures	
July 16, 1993	Hocus Pocus	Walt Disney Pictures	Touchwood Pacific Partners
July 23, 1993	Another Stakeout	Touchstone Pictures	
August 6, 1993	My Boyfriend's Back	Touchstone Pictures	
August 27, 1993	Father Hood	Hollywood Pictures	
September 8, 1993	The Joy Luck Club	Hollywood Pictures	
September 10, 1993	Money for Nothing	Hollywood Pictures	
September 24, 1993	The Program	Touchstone Pictures	North American, U.K. and Irish distribution only; The Samuel Goldwyn Company
October 1, 1993	Cool Runnings	Walt Disney Pictures	
October 29, 1993	The Nightmare Before Christmas	Touchstone Pictures	Skellington Productions
November 12, 1993	The Three Musketeers	Walt Disney Pictures	Caravan Pictures and Avnet–Kerner Productions
December 10, 1993	Sister Act 2: Back in the Habit	Touchstone Pictures	
December 25, 1993	Tombstone	Hollywood Pictures	North and Latin American distribution only; Cinergi Pictures
January 7, 1994	The Air Up There	Hollywood Pictures	Interscope Communications, PolyGram Filmed Entertainment and Nomura Babcock & Brown
January 7, 1994	Cabin Boy	Touchstone Pictures	Tim Burton Productions
January 14, 1994	Iron Will	Walt Disney Pictures	
February 4, 1994	My Father the Hero	Touchstone Pictures	
February 11, 1994	Blank Check	Walt Disney Pictures	
March 4, 1994	Angie	Hollywood Pictures	Caravan Pictures
March 9, 1994	The Ref	Touchstone Pictures	Don Simpson/Jerry Bruckheimer Films
March 25, 1994	D2: The Mighty Ducks	Walt Disney Pictures	Avnet–Kerner Productions
April 8, 1994	Holy Matrimony	Hollywood Pictures	North American distribution only; Interscope Communications and PolyGram Filmed Entertainment
April 15, 1994	White Fang 2: Myth of the White Wolf	Walt Disney Pictures	
April 22, 1994	The Inkwell	Touchstone Pictures	
April 29, 1994	When a Man Loves a Woman	Touchstone Pictures	
June 3, 1994	Renaissance Man	Touchstone Pictures	North and Latin American distribution only; Parkway Productions and Cinergi Pictures
June 24, 1994	The Lion King	Walt Disney Pictures	Walt Disney Feature Animation
June 29, 1994	I Love Trouble	Touchstone Pictures	distribution outside France and Italy only; Caravan Pictures
July 15, 1994	Angels in the Outfield	Walt Disney Pictures	Caravan Pictures
August 12, 1994	In the Army Now	Hollywood Pictures	
August 19, 1994	Color of Night	Hollywood Pictures	North and Latin American distribution only; Cinergi Pictures
August 25, 1994	It's Pat	Touchstone Pictures	
August 26, 1994	Camp Nowhere	Hollywood Pictures	
September 2, 1994	A Simple Twist of Fate	Touchstone Pictures	
September 14, 1994	Quiz Show	Hollywood Pictures	
September 23, 1994	Terminal Velocity	Hollywood Pictures	Interscope Communications, PolyGram Filmed Entertainment and Nomura Babcock & Brown
September 30, 1994	Ed Wood	Touchstone Pictures	Tim Burton Productions; Di Novi Pictures
October 21, 1994	The Puppet Masters	Hollywood Pictures	
October 28, 1994	Squanto: A Warrior's Tale	Walt Disney Pictures	
November 11, 1994	The Santa Clause	Walt Disney Pictures; Hollywood Pictures	Outlaw Productions
November 23, 1994	A Low Down Dirty Shame	Hollywood Pictures	Caravan Pictures
December 25, 1994	The Jungle Book	Walt Disney Pictures	distribution in the U.S., U.K., Ireland, Scandinavia, the Benelux, Portugal, Greece, Cyprus, Switzerland and Latin America excluding Argentina only
January 6, 1995	Houseguest	Hollywood Pictures	Caravan Pictures
January 20, 1995	Bad Company	Touchstone Pictures	
January 27, 1995	Miami Rhapsody	Hollywood Pictures	
February 3, 1995	The Jerky Boys: The Movie	Touchstone Pictures	Caravan Pictures
February 17, 1995	Heavyweights	Walt Disney Pictures	Caravan Pictures
March 3, 1995	Man of the House	Walt Disney Pictures	All Girl Productions and Orr & Cruickshank Productions
March 3, 1995	Roommates	Hollywood Pictures	North American distribution only; Interscope Communications, PolyGram Filmed Entertainment and Nomura Babcock & Brown
March 24, 1995	Tall Tale	Walt Disney Pictures	Caravan Pictures
March 31, 1995	Jefferson in Paris	Touchstone Pictures	North American and select international distribution only; Merchant Ivory Productions
March 31, 1995	Funny Bones	Hollywood Pictures	
April 7, 1995	A Goofy Movie	Walt Disney Pictures	Disney MovieToons, Walt Disney Television Animation, Walt Disney Feature Animation, Walt Disney Animation France and Walt Disney Animation Canada
April 21, 1995	While You Were Sleeping	Hollywood Pictures	Caravan Pictures
April 28, 1995	A Pyromaniac's Love Story	Hollywood Pictures	
May 12, 1995	Crimson Tide	Hollywood Pictures	Don Simpson/Jerry Bruckheimer Films
May 26, 1995	Mad Love	Touchstone Pictures	
June 23, 1995	Pocahontas	Walt Disney Pictures	Walt Disney Feature Animation
June 30, 1995	Judge Dredd	Hollywood Pictures	North and Latin American distribution only; Cinergi Pictures and Edward R. Pressman Film Corporation
July 28, 1995	Operation Dumbo Drop	Walt Disney Pictures	Interscope Communications and PolyGram Filmed Entertainment
August 11, 1995	A Kid in King Arthur's Court	Walt Disney Pictures	North American and select international distribution only; Trimark Pictures and Tapestry Films
August 11, 1995	Dangerous Minds	Hollywood Pictures	Don Simpson/Jerry Bruckheimer Films and Via Rosa Productions
September 8, 1995	Unstrung Heroes	Hollywood Pictures	
September 8, 1995	The Tie That Binds	Hollywood Pictures	North American distribution only; Interscope Communications and PolyGram Filmed Entertainment
September 29, 1995	The Big Green	Walt Disney Pictures	Caravan Pictures and Roger Birnbaum Productions
October 4, 1995	Dead Presidents	Hollywood Pictures	Caravan Pictures and Underworld Entertainment
October 13, 1995	The Scarlet Letter	Hollywood Pictures	North and Latin American distribution only; Cinergi Pictures, Lightmotive, Allied Stars and Moving Pictures
October 13, 1995	Feast of July	Touchstone Pictures	Merchant Ivory Productions
October 20, 1995	Frank and Ollie	Walt Disney Pictures	Theodore Thomas Productions
October 27, 1995	Powder	Hollywood Pictures	Caravan Pictures, Roger Birnbaum Productions and Daniel Grodnik Productions
November 22, 1995	Toy Story	Walt Disney Pictures	Pixar Animation Studios
December 8, 1995	Father of the Bride Part II	Touchstone Pictures	
December 22, 1995	Tom and Huck	Walt Disney Pictures	
December 22, 1995	Nixon	Hollywood Pictures	distribution in North and Latin America, Germany, Austria, Switzerland, China and Japan only; Illusion Entertainment Group and Cinergi Pictures
December 29, 1995	Mr. Holland's Opus	Hollywood Pictures	North American distribution only; Interscope Communications and PolyGram Filmed Entertainment
February 2, 1996	White Squall	Hollywood Pictures	North American distribution only; Largo Entertainment and Scott Free Productions
February 16, 1996	Muppet Treasure Island	Walt Disney Pictures	Jim Henson Productions
February 16, 1996	Mr. Wrong	Touchstone Pictures	Mandeville Films
February 23, 1996	Before and After	Hollywood Pictures	Caravan Pictures
March 1, 1996	Up Close & Personal	Touchstone Pictures	North American distribution only; Cinergi Pictures and Avnet/Kerner Productions
March 8, 1996	Homeward Bound II: Lost in San Francisco	Walt Disney Pictures	
March 15, 1996	Two Much	Touchstone Pictures	North American distribution only; Interscope Communications, PolyGram Filmed Entertainment, Fernando Trueba Producciones Cinematográficas S.A and Sogetel
March 22, 1996	Little Indian, Big City	Touchstone Pictures	North American distribution only
April 12, 1996	James and the Giant Peach	Walt Disney Pictures	distribution outside the U.K., Ireland, Germany and Austria only; Allied Filmmakers and Skellington Productions
April 19, 1996	Celtic Pride	Hollywood Pictures	Caravan Pictures and Roger Birnbaum Productions
May 3, 1996	Last Dance	Touchstone Pictures	
May 10, 1996	Boys	Touchstone Pictures	North American distribution only; Interscope Communications and PolyGram Filmed Entertainment
May 24, 1996	Spy Hard	Hollywood Pictures	
May 31, 1996	Eddie	Hollywood Pictures	North American distribution only; PolyGram Filmed Entertainment and Island Pictures
June 7, 1996	The Rock	Hollywood Pictures	Don Simpson/Jerry Bruckheimer Films
June 21, 1996	The Hunchback of Notre Dame	Walt Disney Pictures	Walt Disney Feature Animation
July 3, 1996	Phenomenon	Touchstone Pictures	
July 17, 1996	Kazaam	Touchstone Pictures	North American distribution only; Interscope Communications and PolyGram Filmed Entertainment; North America distribution
August 9, 1996	Jack	Hollywood Pictures	American Zoetrope and Great Oaks Entertainment
August 30, 1996	First Kid	Walt Disney Pictures	Caravan Pictures and Roger Birnbaum Productions
September 13, 1996	The Rich Man's Wife	Hollywood Pictures	Caravan Pictures and Roger Birnbaum Productions
October 4, 1996	D3: The Mighty Ducks	Walt Disney Pictures	Avnet-Kerner Productions
October 25, 1996	The Associate	Hollywood Pictures	North American distribution only; Interscope Communications and PolyGram Filmed Entertainment
November 8, 1996	Ransom	Touchstone Pictures	Imagine Entertainment
November 20, 1996	The War at Home	Touchstone Pictures	North American distribution only
November 27, 1996	101 Dalmatians	Walt Disney Pictures	Great Oaks Entertainment
December 13, 1996	The Preacher's Wife	Touchstone Pictures	The Samuel Goldwyn Company
December 25, 1996	Evita	Hollywood Pictures	North and Latin American and Spanish distribution only; Cinergi Pictures, RSO Films and Dirty Hands Productions
January 17, 1997	Metro	Touchstone Pictures	Caravan Pictures, Eddie Murphy Productions and Roger Birnbaum Productions
January 24, 1997	Prefontaine	Hollywood Pictures	
January 31, 1997	Shadow Conspiracy	Hollywood Pictures	North and Latin American distribution only; Cinergi Pictures
February 14, 1997	That Darn Cat	Walt Disney Pictures	Robert Simonds Productions
March 7, 1997	Jungle 2 Jungle	Walt Disney Pictures	distribution outside France only; TF1 International^{J2J}
March 28, 1997	The 6th Man	Touchstone Pictures	Mandeville Films
April 11, 1997	Grosse Pointe Blank	Hollywood Pictures	Caravan Pictures, Roger Birnbaum Productions and New Crime Productions
April 25, 1997	Romy and Michele's High School Reunion	Touchstone Pictures	
May 30, 1997	Gone Fishin'	Hollywood Pictures	Caravan Pictures
June 6, 1997	Con Air	Touchstone Pictures	Jerry Bruckheimer Films
June 27, 1997	Hercules	Walt Disney Pictures	Walt Disney Feature Animation
July 16, 1997	George of the Jungle	Walt Disney Pictures	Mandeville Films, Jay Ward Productions, The Kerner Entertainment Company and Avnet-Kerner Production
July 18, 1997	Nothing to Lose	Touchstone Pictures	
August 1, 1997	Air Bud	Walt Disney Pictures	North American, Australian and New Zealand distribution only; Buddy Films, Inc.
August 22, 1997	G.I. Jane	Hollywood Pictures	distribution in North and Latin America, France, Germany, Austria, Switzerland, Spain, the Benelux, Australia, New Zealand and Taiwan only; Caravan Pictures, Roger Birnbaum Productions, Largo Entertainment and Scott Free Productions
September 19, 1997	A Thousand Acres	Touchstone Pictures	Beacon Pictures and Propaganda Films
October 10, 1997	RocketMan	Walt Disney Pictures	Caravan Pictures and Roger Birnbaum Productions
October 17, 1997	Playing God	Touchstone Pictures	North American distribution only; Beacon Pictures
October 17, 1997	Washington Square	Hollywood Pictures	North American, U.K. and Irish distribution only; Alchemy Filmworks, Caravan Pictures and Roger Birnbaum Productions
November 26, 1997	Flubber	Walt Disney Pictures	Great Oaks Entertainment
December 25, 1997	Mr. Magoo	Walt Disney Pictures	UPA Productions
December 25, 1997	An American Werewolf in Paris	Hollywood Pictures	North American distribution only; Stonewood Productions
December 25, 1997	Kundun	Touchstone Pictures	North American, U.K. and Irish distribution only; Cappa/De Fina Productions
January 30, 1998	Deep Rising	Hollywood Pictures	North and Hispanic American and French distribution only; Cinergi Pictures
February 27, 1998	Krippendorf's Tribe	Touchstone Pictures	
February 27, 1998	An Alan Smithee Film: Burn Hollywood Burn	Hollywood Pictures	North and Latin American distribution only; Cinergi Pictures
March 27, 1998	Meet the Deedles	Walt Disney Pictures	distribution in North America, the U.K., Ireland, Australia, New Zealand and South Africa only; DIC Entertainment and Peak Productions
May 1, 1998	He Got Game	Touchstone Pictures	distribution in North America, the U.K., Ireland, Australia, New Zealand and the Benelux only; 40 Acres and a Mule Filmworks
May 8, 1998	The Horse Whisperer	Touchstone Pictures	
June 12, 1998	Six Days, Seven Nights	Touchstone Pictures	Caravan Pictures, Northern Lights Entertainment and Roger Birnbaum Productions
June 19, 1998	Mulan	Walt Disney Pictures	Walt Disney Feature Animation
July 1, 1998	Armageddon	Touchstone Pictures	Jerry Bruckheimer Films and Valhalla Motion Pictures
July 24, 1998	Mafia!	Touchstone Pictures	
July 29, 1998	The Parent Trap	Walt Disney Pictures	
September 4, 1998	Firelight	Hollywood Pictures	distribution in North America, the U.K., Ireland, Germany, Austria, Spain and Italy only; Wind Dancer Productions and Carnival Films
September 11, 1998	Simon Birch	Hollywood Pictures	Caravan Pictures, Roger Birnbaum Productions and Laurence Mark Productions
October 9, 1998	Holy Man	Touchstone Pictures	Caravan Pictures, Eddie Murphy Productions and Roger Birnbaum Productions
October 9, 1998	Rushmore	Touchstone Pictures	American Empirical Pictures
October 16, 1998	Beloved	Touchstone Pictures	Harpo Films and Clinica Estetico
November 6, 1998	The Waterboy	Touchstone Pictures	
November 13, 1998	I'll Be Home for Christmas	Walt Disney Pictures	Mandeville Films
November 20, 1998	Enemy of the State	Touchstone Pictures	Jerry Bruckheimer Films and Scott Free Productions
November 25, 1998	A Bug's Life	Walt Disney Pictures	Pixar Animation Studios
December 25, 1998	Mighty Joe Young	Walt Disney Pictures	RKO Pictures and The Jacobson Company
January 8, 1999	A Civil Action	Touchstone Pictures	North American distribution only; Paramount Pictures and Wildwood Enterprises, Inc
February 12, 1999	My Favorite Martian	Walt Disney Pictures	
February 26, 1999	The Other Sister	Touchstone Pictures	Mandeville Films
March 26, 1999	Doug's 1st Movie	Walt Disney Pictures	Jumbo Pictures
March 31, 1999	10 Things I Hate About You	Touchstone Pictures	
May 14, 1999	Endurance	Walt Disney Pictures	
June 4, 1999	Instinct	Touchstone Pictures	distribution outside the Nordics, Spain, Portugal, Angola, Mozambique, South Africa, Greece, Cyprus, Poland, Hungary, Israel, Japan, French-language television, Benelux pay television, Italian free television, and international airlines and ships only; Spyglass Entertainment
June 18, 1999	Tarzan	Walt Disney Pictures	Walt Disney Feature Animation
July 2, 1999	Summer of Sam	Touchstone Pictures	distribution in North America, Argentina, the Benelux, Scandinavia, Spain, South Africa, Australia, New Zealand and Asia excluding Korea only; 40 Acres and a Mule Filmworks
July 23, 1999	Inspector Gadget	Walt Disney Pictures	Caravan Pictures, DIC Entertainment, Avnet–Kerner Productions and Roger Birnbaum Productions
August 6, 1999	The Sixth Sense	Hollywood Pictures	distribution outside Germany, Austria, the Nordics, Portugal, Angola, Mozambique, South Africa, Greece, Cyprus, Poland, Hungary, Israel, Japan, French-language and Spanish-language television, Benelux pay television, Italian free television, and international airlines and ships only; Spyglass Entertainment, The Kennedy/Marshall Company and Barry Mendel Productions
August 13, 1999	The 13th Warrior	Touchstone Pictures	distribution outside France, Germany, Austria, Switzerland, Portugal, Greece, Cyprus, Eastern Europe, the Middle East, Israel, Iceland, Turkey, India, Korea, Taiwan and Japan only
September 17, 1999	Breakfast of Champions	Hollywood Pictures	North American distribution only; Summit Entertainment
September 24, 1999	Mumford	Touchstone Pictures	
October 1, 1999	Mystery, Alaska	Hollywood Pictures	
October 15, 1999	The Straight Story	Walt Disney Pictures	U.S., Scandinavian, Australian and New Zealand distribution only; Asymmetrical Productions, Canal+, Channel Four Films, Ciby 2000 and Le Studio Canal+
November 5, 1999	The Insider	Touchstone Pictures	distribution outside Germany, Austria, the Nordics, Portugal, Angola, Mozambique, South Africa, Poland, Hungary, Israel, Japan, French-language and Spanish-language television, Benelux pay television and Italian free television only; Forward Pass
November 24, 1999	Toy Story 2	Walt Disney Pictures	Pixar Animation Studios
December 10, 1999	Deuce Bigalow: Male Gigolo	Touchstone Pictures	Happy Madison Productions and Out of the Blue...Entertainment
December 10, 1999	Cradle Will Rock	Touchstone Pictures	North American, U.K. and Irish distribution only
December 17, 1999	Bicentennial Man	Touchstone Pictures	North American distribution only; Columbia Pictures, 1492 Pictures, Laurence Mark Productions and Radiant Productions
December 17, 1999	Fantasia 2000	Walt Disney Pictures	Walt Disney Feature Animation

== See also ==
- List of Disney feature-length home entertainment releases
- List of Disney television films
- List of Disney+ original films
- List of Hollywood Pictures films
- List of films released by Lucasfilm
- List of Marvel Studios films
- List of Searchlight Pictures films
- List of 20th Century Studios films
- List of Touchstone Pictures films
- List of Walt Disney Pictures films
- Category:Lists of films by studio
