= Roger Aaron Brown =

American actor

- Born: Washington, D.C., U.S.
- Other name: Roger Brown
- Occupation: Actor
- Years active: 1972–2015

Roger Aaron Brown is an American character actor known for his role as Deputy Chief Joe Noland on the hit CBS drama television series The District from 2000 to 2004, and for his minor role in the 1988 science fiction film Alien Nation.

== Career ==
Brown appears in the first two episodes of the TNT television series Saving Grace as the Chief of Detectives, as well as portraying Colonel Joseph Ntila in the 4th episode of the 6th season of House M.D.. Brown has made a number of appearances in many films especially Caravan Pictures. He portrayed John Henry in Disney's Tall Tale (1995). Other roles include Star Trek: The Motion Picture (1979), Cobra (1986), Near Dark (1987), Action Jackson (1988), Downtown (1990), and RoboCop 2 (1990).

He also provided the voice of Achilles Davenport in the 2012 video game, Assassin's Creed III. He reprised the role, albeit as a much younger version of the character, in 2014's prequel Assassin's Creed Rogue. Brown also voiced Dr. Imran Zere in the 2015 survival-horror game, Dying Light.

== Filmography ==
=== Film ===
Year	Title	Role	Notes
1950	Immaculate	—N/a	
1973	The Crazies	#3 Soldier at house	
1979	Star Trek: The Motion Picture	Epsilon Technician	
1980	First Family	Longo's Left Hand Man	
1982	Don't Cry, It's Only Thunder	Moses Drapper	
1986	Cobra	Policeman #2	
1987	Near Dark	Cajun Truck Driver	
1988	Action Jackson	Officer Lack	
1988	Moon over Parador	Desmond	
1988	Alien Nation	Bill Tuggle	
1990	Downtown	Lt. Sam Parral	
1990	Meet the Applegates	Sheriff Heidegger	
1990	RoboCop 2	Whittaker	
1991	Shout	Additional voices	
1991	Grave Images	First Cop	
1994	China Moon	Police Captain	
1995	Tall Tale	John Henry	
1995	Galaxis	Detective Carter	
1995	The Wind in the Willows	Pan	
1996	DNA	Loren Azenfeld	
2009	The Princess and the Frog	Additional voices	
2010	The LXD: The Uprising Begins	Narrator	
2010	The LXD: The Secrets of the Ra	Narrator	
2012	Seeking a Friend for the End of the World	Alfred	
2013	Holy Ghost People	Brother Cole	
2015	The Meddler	Airport Security	

=== Television ===
Year	Title	Role	Notes
1974	Great Performances	Bellerose / Cadet	Episode: "Cyrano de Bergerac "
1974	The Streets of San Francisco	Bennett	Episode: "I Ain't Marchin' Anymore"
1974	Bad Ronald	Sergeant Carter	Television film
1974	Cannon	Jebediah	Episode: "A Killing in the Family"
1974	Good Times	Officer Connors	Episode: "The Gang: Part 2"
1975	Mannix	Bill Rogell	Episode: "Chance Meeting"
1975	Kojak	Thompson	Episode: "Two-Four-Six for Two Hundred"
1975	Caribe	Willie Foyle	Episode: "School for Killers"
1975	Foster and Laurie	Sims	Television film
1976	McNaughton's Daughter	Zareb Parker	Episode: "McNaughton's Daughter"
1976	The Rockford Files	Officer Aaron	Episode: "Feeding Frenzy"
1976	Spencer's Pilots	Jerry	Episode: "The Search"
1976	Delvecchio	Stan the Man	Episode: "Thicker Than Water"
1977	Switch	Col. George Radburn	Episode: "Heritage of Death"
1977	The 3,000 Mile Chase	Prosecutor	Television film
1977	The Incredible Hulk	Lab Technician	Episode: "Death in the Family"
1979	Barney Miller	Dr. Anthony Keeling	Episode: "Computer Crime"
1979	Death Car on the Freeway	Eddie	Television film
1981	Thornwell	Court Officer	Television film
1981–1985	Days of Our Lives	Danny Grant	194 episodes
1984	Sins of the Past	Dennis Warren	Television film
1984	T. J. Hooker	Coleman Young	Episode: "Anatomy of a Killing"
1984	I Married a Centerfold	Bob Waters	Television film
1985	Alfred Hitchcock Presents	Joe Chandler	Episode: "Night Fever"
1985	Streets of Justice	Det. Crowther	Television film
1986	Scarecrow and Mrs. King	Rashidi	Episode: "Billy's Lost Weekend"
1986	Outlaws	Lieutenant Jack Kirkum	Episode: "Outlaws"
1987	Ohara	Cop #3	Episode: "Eddie"
1987	Night Court	Clinton	Episode: "Here's to You, Mrs. Robinson"
1989	Hard Time on Planet Earth	Officer Stoff	Episode: "The Way Home"
1989	MacGyver	Various roles	2 episodes
1990	Matlock	Daryl Wilson	Episode: "Nowhere to Turn"
1991	Father Dowling Mysteries	Father Pike	Episode: "The Priest Killer Mystery"
1991	Parker Lewis Can't Lose	Coach Tripp	Episode: "Fat Boy and Little Man"
1991	Reasonable Doubts	Samuel Gunn	Episode: "Dicky's Got the Blues"
1991–1993	I'll Fly Away	Reverend Henry	10 episodes
1992	With a Vengeance	Arnold Bell	Television film
1992	Picket Fences	FBI Agent	Episode: "The Green Bay Chopper"
1994	Cries from the Heart	Eliot	Television film
1994	On Our Own	Gordon Ormsby	11 episodes
1995	JAG	General Larry Butler	Episode: "Desert Son"
1996	Diagnosis: Murder	Attorney Clark Easton	Episode: "Murder Can Be Contagious"
1996	Dark Skies	Reverend Poole	Episode: "We Shall Overcome"
1997	Hangin' with Mr. Cooper	Spencer Russell	Episode: "The In-Laws"
1997	The Gregory Hines Show	Emcee	Episode: "Ben-Her"
1997	Party of Five	Minister	Episode: "Sickness, Health/Richer, Poorer"
1998	Promised Land	Howard Banks	Episode: "Denver, Welcome Home"
1998	To Have & to Hold	Prosecutor	Episode: "Who's Sorry Next?"
1999	The Hughleys	Uncle Gus	Episode: "Roots: Part 1"
2000	Judging Amy	Judge Fastbind	Episode: "Zero to Sixty"
2000	Miracle in Lane 2	Vic Sauder	Television film
2000	The Trouble with Normal	Mr. Vesper	Episode: "Not One Pilot"
2000–2004	The District	Deputy Chief Joe Noland	89 episodes
2005	Clubhouse	Clyde 'Smoky' Gable	Episode: "Old Timers Day"
2005	CSI: Crime Scene Investigation	Mr. James	Episode: "Bodies in Motion"
2006	Criminal Minds	Warden Charles Diehl	Episode: "Riding the Lightning"
2006	ER	Dr. Jared Ames	Episode: "Body & Soul"
2007	Saving Grace	Lt. Percy Yukon	2 episodes
2007	Life	Det. Carl Ames	5 episodes
2008	Medium	Dr. Evan Sabow	Episode: "Aftertaste"
2008	CSI: NY	Commander Richard Jackson	Episode: "Hostage"
2009	General Hospital	Senator Fullerton	2 episodes
2009	House	Ntila	Episode: "The Tyrant"
2009	Nip/Tuck	Jeremiah Cole	Episode: "Wesley Clovis"
2010	Supernatural	Joshua	Episode: "Dark Side of the Moon"
2010	The Whole Truth	Judge Hampton	Episode: "Judicial Discretion"
2010–2011	The Legion of Extraordinary Dancers	Narrator	20 episodes
2012	See Dad Run	Interviewer	Episode: "See Dad Meet Matthew Pearson"
2013	Elementary	John Douglas	Episode: "A Landmark Story"

=== Video games ===
Year	Title	Role
2012	Assassin's Creed III	Achilles Davenport
2014	Assassin's Creed Rogue	Achilles Davenport
2015	Dying Light	Dr. Zere / Additional voices
