= Don Brockett =

American actor, comedian, producer and director

- Born: January 30, 1930; Pittsburgh, Pennsylvania, US
- Died: May 2, 1995 (aged 65); Pittsburgh, Pennsylvania, US
- Resting place: Allegheny Cemetery
- Occupations: Actor; comedian; producer; director
- Years active: 1966–1995
- Spouse: Leslie Brockett (m. 1986–1995)

Don Brockett (January 30, 1930 – May 2, 1995) was an American actor, comedian, producer, and director from Pittsburgh, Pennsylvania. He was known for his portrayal of Chef Brockett on Mister Rogers' Neighborhood. He had small parts in many major films including Flashdance, Fletch Lives, The Silence of the Lambs, and Bob Roberts.

== Early life ==
Born Richard Donald Brockett, Jr., Brockett was a son of Richard Donald Brockett, Sr., a salesman, and Regina Krumenacker, a homemaker. He was the youngest of four children. He had two older sisters and an older adopted brother (his biological cousin). Brockett is of German and English ancestry.

Brockett was stricken with polio as a child. As a result, he walked with a noticeable limp throughout his lifetime and often wore braces on his legs.

== Career ==
Heavily influenced by Pittsburgh's arts and entertainment scene during the 1930's and 1940's, Brockett began his entertainment career in the 1950's as a stage actor in Pittsburgh theater. This led him to team up in 1959 with Barbara Mazziotti, billing themselves as "Brockett and Barbara", performing musical comedy revues in Pittsburgh.

In 1968, "Mister Rogers' Neighborhood" made its television debut. Produced locally and broadcast nationally, Brockett became a household name on the show, portraying "Chef Brockett". Brockett delved into his own family's background in cooking to shape the character, an affable baker who taught life lessons through his culinary creations. He played the character until March 1995, two months before his death.

Brockett made his film debut in 1983's "Flashdance", which was filmed in Pittsburgh. This was followed by the 1985 George A. Romero film Day of the Dead. Brockett in 1993 had a bit part in the movie Houseguest, also filmed in Pittsburgh. In all, Brockett appeared in 15 feature films.

== Personal life and death ==
Brockett married his wife Leslie in 1986. Though the couple had no children, Brockett loved children and became heavily involved in child-focused charity work, most notably with polio research, having been a patient of the disease himself.

Barely six months after the release of Houseguest, his final film role, Brockett died of a heart attack. His grave is located at Allegheny Cemetery.

== Legacy ==
Following her husband's death. Leslie Brockett formed the Don Brockett Memorial Scholarship Fund through the Pittsburgh Foundation. The program supports students aspiring to careers in the performing arts at institutions such as Point Park University, University of Pittsburgh, Carnegie Mellon University, and Chatham University.

Brockett's signature chef's hat and apron are displayed at the Senator John Heinz History Center in Pittsburgh.

== Filmography ==
Year	Title	Role	Notes
1983	Flashdance	Pete	
1985	Rappin'	Store Manager	
1985	Day of the Dead	Featured Zombie	
1985	Walls of Glass	Van Driver	
1987	Lady Beware	Locksmith	
1988	Tiger Warsaw	Carl	
1988	The Prince of Pennsylvania	Tony Minetta	
1989	Fletch Lives	Sheriff	
1990	Night of the Living Dead	Zombie	Uncredited
1991	The Silence of the Lambs	Friendly Psychopath	
1991	Bloodsucking Pharaohs in Pittsburgh	Police Chief 'Buzz Saw' Ryan	
1991	Mobsters	Irish Politician	
1992	Passed Away	Froggie	
1992	Bob Roberts	Chairman	
1992	Hoffa	Police Captain	
1993	Money for Nothing	Beer Belly	
1995	Houseguest	Happy Marcelli	
