= Gone Fishin' (film) =

- Theatrical release poster
- Directed by: Christopher Cain
- Written by: J. J. Abrams; Jill Mazursky
- Produced by: Roger Birnbaum; Julie Bergman Sender
- Starring: Joe Pesci; Danny Glover; Rosanna Arquette; Lynn Whitfield
- Cinematography: Dean Semler
- Edited by: Jack Hofstra
- Music by: Randy Edelman
- Production companies: Hollywood Pictures; Caravan Pictures; Roger Birnbaum Productions
- Distributed by: Buena Vista Pictures Distribution
- Release date: May 30, 1997
- Running time: 94 minutes
- Country: United States
- Language: English
- Budget: $53 million
- Box office: $19.7 million

Gone Fishin' is a 1997 American comedy film starring Joe Pesci and Danny Glover as two bumbling fishing enthusiasts. Nick Brimble, Rosanna Arquette, Lynn Whitfield, and Willie Nelson co-star. It is the only collaboration between Glover and Pesci outside of the Lethal Weapon franchise. Christopher Cain directed the film. J. J. Abrams and Jill Mazursky wrote the film's script.

The film was released by Buena Vista Pictures Distribution on May 30, 1997. It was panned by critics and was a box-office bomb, grossing just $19.7 million against its $53 million budget.

== Plot ==
Joe Waters and Gus Green are bumbling, blue-collar, yet happy best friends and next door neighbors who live modestly in Newark, New Jersey and have known each other since childhood. They share the hobby of fishing and win a stay in the Florida Everglades to go angling, but promise to return home in time for Thanksgiving.

On the way, however, while stopping at a restaurant, they meet an Englishman, Martin, who discreetly steals Joe's car keys and leaves. Joe and Gus are forced to push their boat down the road until they are met by two women, Rita and Angie, who are after Martin and offer them a lift. During the ride, a bump causes the boat to disconnect from the car, leaving Joe and Gus stranded yet again, and the boat is accidentally hooked to a train and pulled away along with their beer and supplies. Joe and Gus hitch a ride with two men, but on the way, they see their car at a gas station and investigate. Joe goes to confront Martin inside the bathroom, but backs down when he catches Martin loading a gun. Joe and Gus flee the petrol station in their car, and discover a blood-stained knife in the dashboard.

Joe and Gus stay at a trailer park for the night, and while watching a documentary on television, they learn that Martin is actually Dekker Massey, a wanted criminal who has conned several women out of their riches and is implied to have stabbed his last victim to death and hidden her money and jewelry somewhere. The presenters offer a bounty for Dekker's capture, and Joe and Gus decide to turn in the knife after their fishing trip. Meanwhile, Dekker begins hunting Joe and Gus down.

Following a recommendation by the trailer park owner, Joe and Gus visit Phil Beasly's boatyard and rent a speedboat, but end up breaking almost every gadget on the boat, losing the knife and wrecking the boatyard by accident. Distraught, they decide to return home early, but end up with a flat tire. While getting the spare tire from the trunk, Joe discovers a map that leads to Dekker's fortune. They book a room in a nearby hotel, and while having dinner, they are found by Rita and Angie, who question them about Dekker and reveal that they are after him because Rita's mother was one of Dekker's victims. Joe and Gus promise to bring Dekker to justice, but that night, Gus sleepwalks and starts a fire in the hotel, destroying their suite and the map. They only barely manage to escape undetected, though their car breaks down on the road and Joe is struck by lightning while they try to fix it. Instead of killing him, the lightning boosts Joe's memory and he is able to lead the way to the cave where Dekker hid his fortune. Despite an altercation with an alligator, they retrieve the treasure and escape, but are accosted by Dekker. At gunpoint, Dekker forces them to push Joe's car into the swamp and ties them up inside a sheriff's office, intending to flee the country with the treasure.

After Dekker leaves, however, Joe and Gus are found and freed by their idol, Billy "Catch" Pooler, and they set out to stop Dekker. After a long chase across the swamp, Joe and Gus find and capture Dekker moments before his escape via plane and hand him over to the police. Though they claim the reward money, Joe and Gus are forced to spend it mostly on the damages they caused during their trip.

== Cast ==
- Joe Pesci as Joe Waters
  - Frank Nasso as Young Joe
- Danny Glover as Gus Green
  - Norman D. Golden II as Young Gus
- Rosanna Arquette as Rita, the daughter of one of Dekker Massey's victims
- Lynn Whitfield as Angie, Rita's best friend
- Willie Nelson as Billy "Catch" Pooler, a professional fisherman who is Joe and Gus's idol
- Nick Brimble as Dekker Massey, a British conman
- Carol Kane as Donna Waters, Joe's wife
- Gary Grubbs as Phil Beasly, the owner of a boatyard
- Edythe Davis as Cookie Green, Gus's wife
- Jenna Bari as Gena Waters, Joe's daughter
- Raynor Scheine as Glenn, the owner of a trailer park
- Maury Chaykin as Kirk, a waiter who takes a shine to Joe and Gus (uncredited)
- Louise Fletcher as Suzy, a restaurant owner (uncredited)
- Ron Duprat as Firefighter

== Production ==
When Gone Fishin' was in the early stages of development during the early 1990s, the roles of Joe and Gus were first offered to John Candy and Rick Moranis. Both turned it down as they were busy with other projects. Once the film was given the greenlight in 1995, Joe Pesci and Danny Glover were eventually cast as the leads. John G. Avildsen was set to direct and had already filmed it for the first two weeks, but he was fired from Disney and paid his $2 million salary to the studio; Christopher Cain immediately signed on to replace him.

The production went over-schedule and over-budget, eventually coming in at a final cost of $53 million. Most of the movie was filmed around The Everglades and the Big Cypress Swamp in Florida.

As with many of Pesci's 1990s films, Pesci's friend, employee and former Four Seasons guitarist Tommy DeVito makes a cameo appearance.

=== Filming accident ===
During production of the film, stuntwoman Janet Wilder was killed when a boat that was made to jump a ramp into a group of other boats in one of the scenes went awry. Instead of completing that stunt, the speedboat containing Pesci and Glover's stunt doubles flipped upside down and collided with two separate boats, landing into the set containing film crew and extras where it struck Wilder and killed her. Wilder's husband, her father-in-law, and two others were also injured.

== Reception ==
=== Box office ===
In its opening weekend, the film opened at #3 at the U.S. box office behind The Lost World: Jurassic Park and Addicted to Love, earning $5.8 million. The film eventually made $19.7 million domestically.

=== Critical response ===
On Rotten Tomatoes the film holds an approval rating of 4% based on 27 reviews, with an average score of 2.5/10. The site's critics consensus reads: "Sloppy, formulaic, and unfunny, Gone Fishin' marks a painful low point in the careers of its two talented leads". Audiences polled by CinemaScore gave the film an average grade of "C" on an A+ to F scale.

Film critic Leonard Maltin gave the film a "BOMB" rating, his lowest rating. He called it "an annoyingly unfunny gambit" and declared that it was a waste of Pesci and Glover's talent, and "this film really smells". Film critic Chris Hicks of the Salt Lake Tribune said after Gone Fishin' and 8 Heads in a Duffel Bag that "the Academy should have asked Pesci to return the Oscar he had won for Goodfellas". In Red Lobster, White Trash and the Blue Lagoon, Joe Queenan said that he was "so embarrassed about Joe Pesci that he has been known to wait outside cinemas showing a film called Gone Fishin' and give those few customers who sat through it their money back, on behalf of the "American Celluloid Retribution Society".

The film also received two nominations at the 1997 Stinkers Bad Movie Awards: Most Painfully Unfunny Comedy and Worst Actor for Pesci.

== See also ==
- Accidents while performing a stunt
