= Angie (1994 film) =

- Theatrical release poster
- Directed by: Martha Coolidge
- Written by: Todd Graff
- Based on: Angie, I Says by Avra Wing
- Produced by: Larry Brezner; Patrick McCormick
- Starring: Geena Davis; James Gandolfini; Aida Turturro; Philip Bosco; Stephen Rea
- Cinematography: Johnny E. Jensen
- Edited by: Steven Cohen
- Music by: Jerry Goldsmith
- Production companies: Hollywood Pictures; Caravan Pictures
- Distributed by: Buena Vista Pictures Distribution
- Release date: March 4, 1994
- Running time: 107 minutes
- Country: United States
- Language: English
- Budget: $26 million
- Box office: $9.4 million

Angie is a 1994 American romantic comedy-drama film directed by Martha Coolidge, written by Todd Graff, and starring Geena Davis as the title character. It was produced by Hollywood Pictures and Caravan Pictures and released by Buena Vista Pictures Distribution on March 4, 1994. It is based on the 1991 novel Angie, I Says by Avra Wing, which was a New York Times Notable Book of 1991. The film received mixed reviews and was a box-office bomb, grossing only $9.4 million against its $26 million budget.

== Plot ==
Angie Scacciapensieri is an office worker who lives in the Bensonhurst section of Brooklyn, New York and dreams of a better life. After learning that she is pregnant by her boyfriend Vinnie, she decides that she will have the baby, but not Vinnie as a husband.

This turns the entire neighborhood upside down and starts her on a journey of self-discovery, including a love affair with a man named Noel who she meets at an art museum. Even her best friend Tina has trouble understanding her.

== Cast ==
- Geena Davis as Angie Scacciapensieri
- James Gandolfini as Vinnie
- Stephen Rea as Noel
- Aida Turturro as Tina
- Philip Bosco as Frank Scacciapensieri
- Jenny O'Hara as Kathy Scacciapensieri
- Michael Rispoli as Jerry
- Betty Miller as Joanne Scacciapensieri
- Susan Jaffe as Ballerina
- Ray Xifo as Dr. Gould
- Rosemary De Angelis as Aunt Vicky
- Leonard Spinelli as Tina's Son #2
- Adam LeFevre as Museum Guard
- Margaret Cho as Admissions Nurse

== Production ==
20th Century Fox films head Joe Roth, production president Roger Birnbaum and producer Larry Brezner had Angie, I Says under development. Todd Graff had written the screenplay for Madonna. The adaptation was placed into turnaround. Roth and Birnbaum had left for an independent label at Disney, Caravan Pictures, and were able to get the adaptation moved there from Fox. Because of scheduling conflicts with her role in Abel Ferrara's movie Dangerous Game, which is also produced by her company, Maverick, she dropped out of the then Jonathan Kaplan-directed film. Madonna had wanted them to push back production on the film, but given that it was a winter story, Caravan wanted to film it in winter, then debut it in winter. She bowed out as they also took issue with her lack of acting experience. The lead role was then offered to Geena Davis.

== Reception ==
The film opened to mixed reviews and was a box-office bomb. On Rotten Tomatoes, the film holds a rating of 53% from 19 critics. Audiences surveyed by CinemaScore gave the film a grade of "B" on scale of A+ to F.

=== Year-end lists ===
- Top 10 worst (listed alphabetically, not ranked) – Mike Mayo, The Roanoke Times

=== Awards ===
- The movie was nominated an Artios for Best Casting for Feature Film, Comedy by the Casting Society of America.
