= Celtic Pride =

1996 film directed by Tom DeCerchio

- Theatrical release poster
- Directed by: Tom DeCerchio
- Screenplay by: Judd Apatow
- Story by: Judd Apatow; Colin Quinn
- Produced by: Roger Birnbaum; Judd Apatow
- Starring: Damon Wayans; Daniel Stern; Dan Aykroyd; Gail O'Grady; Christopher McDonald
- Cinematography: Oliver Wood
- Edited by: Hubert De La Bouillerie
- Music by: Basil Poledouris
- Production companies: Hollywood Pictures; Caravan Pictures; Roger Birnbaum Productions
- Distributed by: Buena Vista Pictures Distribution
- Release date: April 19, 1996
- Running time: 90 minutes
- Language: English
- Box office: $9.3 million

Celtic Pride is a 1996 American sports comedy film written by Judd Apatow and Colin Quinn, and directed by Tom DeCerchio. It stars Daniel Stern and Dan Aykroyd as Mike O'Hara and Jimmy Flaherty, two passionate Boston Celtics fans, and Damon Wayans as Lewis Scott, the Utah Jazz's All-Star shooting guard.

Celtic Pride was released by Buena Vista Pictures Distribution on April 19, 1996. The film received negative reviews from critics and grossed $9.3 million.

== Plot ==
Physical education teacher Mike O'Hara has recently moved back in with his best friend Jimmy Flaherty after Mike's wife Carol left him and took their son Tommy with her, due to Mike's obsession with the Boston Celtics. Mike and Jimmy, on the other hand, are united by their love of Boston and its sports teams, especially the Celtics, who are playing their last season in the Boston Garden. When the Celtics lose Game 6 of the NBA Finals to the Utah Jazz, setting up a deciding Game 7 in Boston, Mike and Jimmy find themselves depressed and hopeless.

Jimmy and Mike stumble upon the Jazz's selfish, arrogant shooting guard Lewis Scott at a Boston nightclub. Hoping at first to get him so drunk that he will be hungover for Game 7, Mike and Jimmy pose as Utah fans. However, the pair get more than they bargained for when the next morning they end up kidnapping Scott after he wakes up at Jimmy's apartment. The two decide to hold Scott until after the game, reasoning that if they are going to prison, they might as well help the Celtics win in the meantime.

Scott derides them for being washed-up losers and insinuates Mike (who had played college ball but was not good enough to go professional) is only after him because he is jealous of Scott's fame and ability. Mike, on the other hand, berates Scott for his behavior on and off the court, including starring in a campy Oscar Mayer hot dog commercial, skipping practices, and disrespecting his teammates. Scott attempts to turn Jimmy against Mike and manages to free himself, only to be foiled by an antagonistic cabbie and a local cop, Kevin, both fellow Celtics fans.

Ultimately, Mike challenges Scott to a game of one-on-one; the canny Scott is able to subdue him and Jimmy with Jimmy's gun. Before he runs off, Scott presents the pair with a dilemma: they must root for him and the Jazz to win, or he will turn them both in to the police. Mike reconciles with his wife and son, knowing he might be going to prison, and Jimmy says goodbye to his grandmother. At the game, the two convince the other Celtics fans they are only pretending to root for the Jazz to jinx them, and the first half ends with the Celtics leading. Mike, who knows the Jazz are losing because Scott refuses to pass the ball, gives him a pep talk from the stands, and Utah closes the gap to one point with a little over 7 seconds remaining.

With one play left and the Jazz seemingly on the verge of defeat, Mike and Jimmy choose life over the Celtics, rooting for Utah and rushing the court after they win. Approached by Kevin, who earlier ignored his cries for help, Scott denies Mike and Jimmy committed the kidnapping, saving them from prison.

A few months later, Mike has reconciled with his wife by promising to never interfere with an NBA Finals game again. When football season begins, however, he and Jimmy sneak into Deion Sanders' hotel room at 3:00 a.m., presumably to kidnap him.

== Cast ==
- Daniel Stern as Mike O'Hara
- Dan Aykroyd as Jimmy Flaherty
- Damon Wayans as Lewis Scott
- Christopher McDonald as Coach Kimball
- Gail O'Grady as Carol O'Hara
- Adam Hendershott as Tommy O'Hara
- Paul Guilfoyle as Kevin O'Grady
- Scott Lawrence as Ted Hennison
- Darrell Hammond as Chris McCarthy
- Vladimir Cuk as Lurch
- Deion Sanders as himself
- Bill Walton as himself
- Larry Bird as himself
- Marv Albert as himself
- Bob Cousy as himself

== Reception ==
The film was not a major success despite its star power, grossing less than $10 million domestically. The film received negative reviews. On Rotten Tomatoes it has an approval rating of 12% based on reviews from 25 critics. Audiences surveyed by CinemaScore gave the film a grade of B− on a scale of A to F.

Hal Hinson of The Washington Post wrote, "Celtic Pride is clearly intended as a spoof on the contemporary mania for athletics. But not only is the picture woefully short on laughs, it's also coarse, overbearing and, in places, downright insulting". TV Guide said "Celtic Pride supplies predictably lowbrow yocks for jocks, and its rather disturbing racial implications go entirely unacknowledged," and awarded it 1 and half stars out of five.

In a positive review, Joe Leydon of Variety said "Not quite a three-pointer, but definitely more than an airball, Celtic Pride is an uneven but largely likable basketball-themed comedy that should lay up decent B.O. numbers and perform even better in the homevid arena."

Bill Murray has said he has seen this film and has credited it as to why he turns down role offers from Judd Apatow.

== See also ==
- List of basketball films
