= First Kid =

1996 film by David Mickey Evans

- Theatrical release poster
- Directed by: David Mickey Evans
- Written by: Tim Kelleher
- Produced by: Roger Birnbaum
- Starring: Sinbad; Robert Guillaume; Timothy Busfield
- Cinematography: Anthony B. Richmond
- Edited by: Harry Keramidas
- Music by: Richard Gibbs
- Production companies: Walt Disney Pictures; Caravan Pictures; Roger Birnbaum Productions
- Distributed by: Buena Vista Pictures Distribution
- Release date: August 30, 1996
- Running time: 101 minutes
- Country: United States
- Language: English
- Budget: $15 million
- Box office: $26,465,920 (USA)

First Kid is a 1996 American slapstick comedy film directed by David Mickey Evans and starring Sinbad. It was mostly filmed in Richmond, Virginia with mall scenes filmed at Tysons Galleria in McLean, Virginia

== Plot ==
Sam Simms is an ambitious Secret Service agent assigned by his superior, Wilkes, to protect President Paul Davenport's rebellious 13-year-old son, Luke Davenport, after Luke's behavior causes another agent, Woods, to be replaced for mistreating Luke in front of media cameras. Simms sees this assignment as undesirable, but a possible stepping stone to protecting the President. He fails to connect with the boy at first, and Luke continues to misbehave.

After seeing Luke get beat up by the school bully, Rob MacArthur, Luke's parents punish him, even though he didn't start the fight. Because of the re-election, they can't risk Luke going out in public for a month while his parents are on the campaign trail. Simms feels sorry for him - he had felt alone as a teenager, too (he lost his father in Vietnam while his mother worked several jobs to financially support him) - and they become friends. Simms, a former boxer, agrees to sneak Luke out against the wishes of his parents and teach him how to fight.

Meanwhile, Luke agonizes over asking the cutest girl, Katie Warren, to the school dance, which he finally does successfully with Simms's help. However, while Simms and Luke are practicing some moves for the dance, the Secret Service director Morton tells them that they can't go to the dance due to an emergency lockdown. A duffel bag left unattended on the sidewalk outside the main entrance is being investigated by the bomb squad. Simms, breaking the rules, takes Luke to the dance. There, Rob tries to attack Luke again while Simms is distracted, but this time, Luke puts him down.

After that, Secret Service agents bust the school dance and retrieve Luke. Simms is fired and not allowed to speak with Luke, who is crushed that his friend has apparently "abandoned" him. Luke, under house arrest and with a homing device attached to him, receives advice from an online friend, Mongoose12, on how to escape the White House and meet him at a local mall. Luke agrees, but it is revealed that Mongoose12 was in fact former agent Woods, who abducts him. When Luke goes missing, Simms is given another chance to protect him. With the help of his friend and former colleague Harold (a paraplegic who owns a spy shop), he quickly tracks Luke to the mall using a tracking device Simms had discreetly planted on him.

In a standoff, Woods says he was originally planning on returning Luke to the President so he could be a hero and get his job back, but now he wants to kill him instead, blaming Luke for making him lose his job, and even his wife. Woods tries to shoot Simms, but he takes cover and once Woods is out of bullets, Simms brings him down with a right uppercut. As other agents arrive, Woods tries to shoot Luke with a back-up revolver, but Simms jumps in front of Luke, causing him to take the intended bullet in his arm. Woods is also shot, subdued, and arrested by other arriving Secret Service agents for abduction, assault, discharging a firearm in a public place unlawfully, and attempted murder.

Simms is offered Presidential duty, which he declines in order to stay with Luke full time. This means he can also spend more time with Luke's biology teacher, with whom he has formed a romantic relationship.

== Cast ==
- Sinbad as Secret Service Agent Sam Simms
- Robert Guillaume as Secret Service Agent Nick Wilkes
- Timothy Busfield as Secret Service Agent Woods
- Brock Pierce as U.S. First Son Luke Davenport
- James Naughton as U.S. President Paul Davenport
- Art LaFleur as Secret Service Director Morton
- Zachery Ty Bryan as Rob MacArthur
- Bill Cobbs as Speet
- Lisa Eichhorn as U.S. First Lady Linda Davenport
- Blake Boyd as Secret Service Agent Dash
- Erin Williby as Katie Warren
- Michael Krawic as James
- Fawn Reed as Susan Lawrence
- Tomas Arana as Harold
- Sonny Bono as himself (Cameo Appearance)
- Sean "Oleus" Sullivan as Kid in Shopping Mall Chase
- Bill Clinton as himself (Cameo Appearance)
- Jonathan Cabot Wade as School Kid

This film would turn out to be the final on-screen appearance of Sonny Bono before his death in 1998, who, at the time of the film's release, was serving in the U.S. House of Representatives. Bono plays himself as a Congressman coming to the White House, to visit the President. Simms bumps into him outside the Oval Office and fawns over him.

== Ratings ==
When First Kid was rated for video release by the BBFC, one minute and thirty one seconds were cut, due to the hostage attack in the shopping mall. At the time, the BBFC felt that this, and the sudden onslaught of violence, were too intense for a 'PG' certificate. In 2002, all cuts were waived for a 'PG' rating.

== Reception ==
=== Box office ===
The movie debuted at #3, behind The Crow: City of Angels and Tin Cup. It did just over $8.4 million in ticket sales on 1,878 screens.

=== Critical response ===
Rotten Tomatoes gives the film a score of 20%, based on reviews from 15 critics. On Metacritic it has a score of 48% based on reviews from 14 critics, indicating "mixed or average" reviews. Audiences polled by CinemaScore gave the film a grade "B" on scale of A to F.

== TV series ==
In December 1996, following the film's release discussions were held with Disney's TV division about adapting the film's premise as a TV series.
