= Washington Square (film) =

1997 film by Agnieszka Holland

- Theatrical release poster
- Directed by: Agnieszka Holland
- Screenplay by: Carol Doyle
- Based on: Washington Square by Henry James
- Produced by: Roger Birnbaum; Julie Bergman Sender
- Starring: Jennifer Jason Leigh; Albert Finney; Ben Chaplin; Maggie Smith; Judith Ivey
- Cinematography: Jerzy Zieliński
- Edited by: David Siegel
- Music by: Jan A.P. Kaczmarek
- Production companies: Alchemy Filmworks; Caravan Pictures; Hollywood Pictures; Roger Birnbaum Productions
- Distributed by: Buena Vista Pictures Distribution
- Release dates: September 12, 1997 (TIFF); October 17, 1997
- Running time: 116 minutes
- Country: United States
- Language: English
- Budget: $15 million
- Box office: $1.9 million

Washington Square is a 1997 American romantic drama film directed by Agnieszka Holland, and starring Jennifer Jason Leigh, Albert Finney, Ben Chaplin, Maggie Smith and Judith Ivey. The screenplay by Carol Doyle is based on Henry James' novel of the same name, which was filmed as The Heiress in 1949. The film was a critical success, but a commercial failure.

== Plot ==
Dr. Austin Sloper is a doctor and resident of a large house on New York's Washington Square. His wife dies in childbirth, leaving a daughter, Catherine, to be raised by her father. As a child, Catherine is overweight, clumsy, and untalented; however, she is also a sweet, affectionate child. She adores her father and tries hard to please him, but he considers her a disappointment and treats her with ironic condescension. His thoughts are still much occupied with his beloved wife and with a promising son who died before Catherine was born, and he privately – but bitterly – resents his only surviving child for causing his wife's death.

Now the 1850s, Sloper invites Catherine's widowed aunt, the incurably foolish Lavinia Penniman, to live at Washington Square as a chaperone for Catherine. Catherine becomes a plain young woman who is painfully shy and inept in the social graces expected of someone of her class, despite her aunt's best efforts to instill them. Apart from her sweet nature, Catherine possesses only one obvious attraction: wealth. She receives $10,000 annually from her mother's estate, and will inherit considerably more when her father dies.

At a party celebrating her cousin Marian Almond's engagement, Catherine is introduced to a handsome, charming young man named Morris Townsend. He is attentive, respectful, and – to Catherine's obvious astonishment – clearly interested in her. He begins paying regular calls at Washington Square. Before long, the susceptible Catherine falls headlong in love with him. Sloper, however, suspects Townsend of being a fortune hunter, with no intention of pursuing a career. Aunt Lavinia loves melodrama and gets a vicarious thrill from Townsend's attentions; and so, contrary to Sloper's wishes, she does all she can to encourage the relationship, even meeting Townsend secretly to collude with him.

Townsend proposes marriage and Sloper refuses to give his consent, telling Catherine he will disinherit her if she marries without it. Catherine doesn't care about the money, but disobeying her father is another matter. She dutifully accompanies Sloper on a Grand Tour of Europe, during which he exhorts her to give Townsend up; she refuses, and a frustrated Sloper speaks to her with such contempt that she finally admits to herself that he despises her. The realization pains her deeply, but also strengthens her resolve to separate herself from him and bestow all her love and loyalty on Townsend.

Catherine comes home, determined to marry. When she and Morris are reunited, she convinces him that her father will never relent. Shortly afterward, he backs out of the relationship. When Catherine tearfully confronts him, he admits his mercenary motives outright.

Years pass and Catherine has refused at least one respectable offer of marriage. When her father's health fails, she nurses him through his last illness. During his final days, he asks her to promise never to marry Morris Townsend. With quiet dignity, she replies that while she seldom thinks of Townsend, she can't make such a promise. Sloper misunderstands her and alters his will, adding a codicil deploring his daughter's ongoing interest in unscrupulous young men and leaving most of his $300,000 fortune to charity. Catherine is left with only the house and the income from her mother. She isn't offended by the codicil; in fact, at the reading of the will, she laughs.

Some time later, Townsend reappears at her doorstep. Catherine, who is now running a daycare center in her house, talks to him briefly. She isn't angry, but she has no interest in renewing their relationship, and tells him so, quietly and firmly. He departs, leaving Catherine to reflect on the passion she once experienced.

== Cast ==
- Jennifer Jason Leigh as Catherine Sloper
  - Sara Ruzicka as 11-year-old Catherine
- Albert Finney as Dr. Austin Sloper
- Ben Chaplin as Morris Townsend
- Maggie Smith as Aunt Lavinia
- Judith Ivey as Aunt Elizabeth Almond
- Arthur Laupus as Mr. Almond
- Jennifer Garner as Marian Almond
- Robert Stanton as Arthur Townsend
- Betsy Brantley as Mrs. Montgomery
- Nancy Daly as Maureen
- Marie Abate as Agnes
- Sara Constance Marshall as Therese
- Rachel Layne Sacrey as Sarah Almond
- Rachel Osborne as Alice Almond
- Scott Jaeck as John Ludlow
- Peter Maloney as Jacob Webber
- Lauren Hulsey as Edith
- Loretto McNally as Midwife

== Production ==
Baltimore's historic Union Square served as the film's eponymous 19th-century New York City setting. The scene set in the Alps was filmed on Minaret Summit in the Sierra Nevada in California.

The lyrics for "The Tale of the String" were written by Alan and Marilyn Bergman. Jan A.P. Kaczmarek composed the music for that tune as well as "Tu chiami una vita," with lyrics by Salvatore Quasimodo, and "L'Absence," with lyrics by Théophile Gautier.

== Release ==
=== Box office ===
The film opened on October 17, 1997 and earned $14,352 in its opening weekend. By the time the film closed, it had grossed $1,851,761 in the domestic box office.

=== Critical reception ===
Washington Square has an approval rating of 81% on review aggregator website Rotten Tomatoes, based on 31 reviews, and an average rating of 7.2/10.

In her review in The New York Times, Janet Maslin called the film "bracing and perfectly cast" and Jennifer Jason Leigh "unstintingly gutsy". She added, "Ms. Holland gives this story compelling intimacy and a brusque, energetic pace...Maggie Smith steals many a scene."

Roger Ebert of the Chicago Sun-Times observed "Jennifer Jason Leigh often plays women of brassy boldness...what is remarkable is how she can also play a recessive character such as Catherine so that every assertion seems like an act of courage."

In Variety, Todd McCarthy wrote "Washington Square emerges with only a portion of its force and complexity intact in this new screen version. Quite faithful to the novel but imbued with something of a feminist twist, Agnieszka Holland's handsome picture captures the ambiguity of this 19th-century tale about a plain young woman's deception by a seductive fortune hunter, but misses the full measure of its acute psychological precision and bitter irony...Also problematic is Holland's cinematic approach, which in its less-than-graceful camera scheme and often arbitrary interaction of shots represents nothing close to the visual correlative of James' cool, refined, utterly precise literary style. The story is so good that it retains a reasonable amount of its force, but the rather scattershot and sometimes overheated treatment here is, in fact, not especially well suited to it."

Edward Guthmann of the San Francisco Chronicle described the film as "meticulous," Jennifer Jason Leigh as "very good," and Albert Finney as "specific and effective." Of Maggie Smith, he said, she "indulges in blatant scene-stealing as Catherine's fussbudget Aunt Lavinia, but the merriment with which she commits her crimes makes it easy to forgive her." He added "Even with its merits, Washington Square runs too long and ends with an ambiguous look from Leigh that feels like a bit of tagged-on feminism by Holland...Moreover, coming as it does on the heels of so many chaste Merchant-Ivory costumers and all the other well-appointed adaptations of Jane Austen, Edith Wharton and E.M. Forster, (it) suffers, inevitably, from arriving late at an already overcrowded gathering."
