= The Big Green =

1995 film by Holly Goldberg Sloan

- Theatrical release poster
- Directed by: Holly Goldberg Sloan
- Written by: Holly Goldberg Sloan
- Produced by: Dennis Bishop; Roger Birnbaum
- Starring: Steve Guttenberg; Olivia d'Abo; Jay O. Sanders
- Cinematography: Ralf D. Bode
- Edited by: John F. Link
- Music by: Randy Edelman
- Production companies: Walt Disney Pictures; Caravan Pictures
- Distributed by: Buena Vista Pictures Distribution
- Release date: September 29, 1995
- Running time: 100 minutes
- Country: United States
- Language: English
- Budget: $12 million
- Box office: $17.7 million

The Big Green is a 1995 American family sports comedy film by Walt Disney Pictures written and directed by Holly Goldberg Sloan. The film stars Olivia d'Abo, Steve Guttenberg and Jay O. Sanders. The film is about the antics of a soccer team consisting of a misfit group of small town Texas kids who are coached by a teacher from England.

The Big Green was released by Buena Vista Pictures Distribution on September 29, 1995. The film received negative reviews from critics and grossed $17.7 million against a $12 million budget.

== Plot ==
Anna Montgomery (d'Abo), a teacher from Surrey, England, finds herself in the fictional town of Elma, Texas in the United States as part of an exchange program. Faced with the challenge of engaging her disheartened students, who view themselves as destined for failure, Anna introduces them to soccer in a novel attempt to connect. This introduction comes about when, in frustration, she inadvertently uses a broken globe to demonstrate soccer techniques. Seeing potential beyond their geography lesson, Anna decides to form a soccer team, enlisting the students as players and entering them into a league in Austin, Texas. Their initial excitement is tempered by the reality of competition, particularly after a crushing 18–0 defeat against the league's top team, the Knights.

Despite the setback, the team's fortunes begin to change with the arrival of Juan Morales (Esquivel), a talented new student. Convincing Juan's hesitant mother to allow him to join the team proves to be a turning point. With Juan on board, the team, now dubbed the Big Green, embarks on an extraordinary winning streak, culminating in an opportunity to face the Knights once again in the championship.

Parallel to the team's journey, the narrative delves into personal relationships and challenges. Tom Palmer (Guttenberg), the town's Sheriff's Deputy, steps in as co-coach, simultaneously developing a romantic interest in Anna. Meanwhile, the team's success brings unexpected conflict when Jay Huffer (Sanders), a former Elma resident and current Knights coach, learns of Juan's mother's undocumented status. This revelation, brought to light by Edwin Douglas (Terry), the father of Kate Douglas (Robertson), threatens to dismantle the team's unity and success.

The community is thrown into turmoil as Juan and his mother are forced to flee, fearing deportation. This situation tests the resolve of the players, especially Kate, who feels betrayed by both her father and Tom. However, Anna's leadership and persuasive skills keep the team focused on their goal, reinforcing their commitment to each other and the game.

As the championship day arrives, the Big Green faces the daunting task of competing without Juan, their star player, whose absence weighs heavily on the team. The match begins unfavorably for Elma, with the Knights taking a 2–0 lead by halftime. However, the game takes a dramatic turn when Juan, along with Tom and his mother, makes a surprising return. Tom announces he has secured a lawyer and sponsorship for Juan's mother, ensuring they can remain in the country legally. Buoyed by Juan's return and Tom's efforts, the team mounts a comeback, with Juan setting up a goal and scoring the equalizing goal himself, forcing the game into a penalty shootout.

In the shootout, each kick increases the pressure until Larry Musgrove (Renna), the Big Green's goalie, faces the ultimate test. Larry, who has been plagued by visions of opposing players as monsters, taps into his imagination to overcome his fears, successfully blocking a critical shot by imagining himself as a monster. This pivotal moment sets the stage for Newt Shaw (Hall), the youngest member of the Big Green, to take the final kick. Newt subsequently scores the winning goal, clinching the championship for the Big Green.

As part of a bet, Huffer begrudgingly honors his promise to kiss the Big Green's goat mascot, Ernie. The film closes with the unveiling of a new billboard in Elma that celebrates the Big Green's dual achievements on the soccer field and in academic improvement.

== Cast ==
- Bug Hall as Newt Shaw
- Steve Guttenberg as Deputy Sheriff Tom Palmer
- Olivia d'Abo as Miss Anna Montgomery
- Jay O. Sanders as Coach Jay Huffer
- John Terry as Edwin V. Douglas
- Patrick Renna as Larry Musgrove
- Chauncey Leopardi as Evan Schiff
- Billy L. Sullivan as Jeffrey Luttrell
- Yareli Arizmendi as Marbelly Morales
- Anthony Esquivel as Juan Morales
- Jessica Robertson as Kate Douglas
- Jordan Brower as Nick Anderssen
- Libby Villari as Brenda Neilson
- Hayley Kolb as Sophia Convertino
- Haley Miller as Polly Neilson
- Ashley Welch as Lou Gates
- Ariel Welch as Sue Gates
- Jimmy Higa as Tak Yamato
- Gil Glasgow as Cookie Musgrove

== Production ==
=== Filming ===
Principal photography began on November 7, 1994 and ended on January 12, 1995. Filming locations included various cities throughout Texas including Austin, Dale, Pflugerville, Elgin, Taylor and Manor.

== Release ==
=== Theatrical ===
The film was released in United States theaters on September 29, 1995.

=== Home media ===
The film went on to sell over five million units when it was released on VHS and LaserDisc on January 31, 1996.

It was later released on DVD on May 4, 2004 and on Blu-Ray on July 13, 2021. It is also included on Disney's streaming service, Disney+.

== Reception ==
=== Critical response ===
On the review aggregator website Rotten Tomatoes, 0% of 6 critics' reviews are positive, with an average rating of 3.6/10.

Stephen Holden gave it a favorable review in The New York Times: "Most of the movie's charm lies in its portrayal of the children as an adorable, if exasperating, multicultural version of Our Gang."

The Dove Foundation in their review wrote: "Written by the same screenwriter who wrote ANGELS IN THE OUTFIELD, THE BIG GREEN develops its fun and excitement without resorting to crude humor, sex or obscene language. THE BIG GREEN is a feel good movie and it is encouraging to see such a quality film make its appearance in lieu of the usual degenerate fare so prevalent today."

In a generally favorable review, John Anderson in the Los Angeles Times described the film as a "puckless Mighty Ducks" and described the young characters as an "endearing group".

Common Sense Media gave The Big Green 3 out of 5 stars, listing it as the third best soccer film made for kids.

=== Box office ===
The film grossed $4,688,285 on its opening Wednesday. The total box office revenue for the movie was $17,736,619.

== See also ==
- List of association football films
