= Tall Tale (film) =

1995 film by Jeremiah Chechik

- Theatrical release poster by John Alvin
- Directed by: Jeremiah Chechik
- Written by: Steven L. Bloom; Robert Rodat
- Produced by: Joe Roth; Roger Birnbaum
- Starring: Scott Glenn; Oliver Platt; Nick Stahl; Stephen Lang; Roger Aaron Brown; Catherine O'Hara; Patrick Swayze
- Cinematography: Janusz Kamiński
- Edited by: Richard Chew
- Music by: Randy Edelman
- Production companies: Walt Disney Pictures; Caravan Pictures
- Distributed by: Buena Vista Pictures Distribution
- Release date: March 24, 1995
- Running time: 96 minutes
- Country: United States
- Language: English
- Budget: $32 million (estimated)
- Box office: $8.2 million

Tall Tale (also known as Tall Tale: The Unbelievable Adventures of Pecos Bill) is a 1995 American Western adventure fantasy film directed by Jeremiah Chechik, written by Steven L. Bloom and Robert Rodat, produced by Walt Disney Pictures and Caravan Pictures and starring Scott Glenn, Oliver Platt, Nick Stahl, Stephen Lang, Roger Aaron Brown, Catherine O'Hara, and Patrick Swayze. It tells the story of a young farm boy who receives aid from tall tale figures in saving his town from a greedy developer.

Though shooting of the film was completed in 1993, it did not get a theatrical release until March 24, 1995 by Buena Vista Pictures Distribution. The film received mixed reviews from critics and was a box office failure, grossing only $8.2 million on an estimated $32 million budget.

== Plot ==
In 1905, Daniel Hackett, a young farm boy from the western town of Paradise Valley, is unhappy with his life and dreams of life in New York City. His father Jonas likes to tell Daniel tall tales about Pecos Bill, Paul Bunyan and John Henry, which Daniel has heard many times, leading him to doubt their existence.

Meanwhile, Paradise Valley is being coveted by a greedy developer, J.P. Stiles. Stiles attempts to convince Jonas and the other farmers to sell their land to him, with Jonas' farm lying in the center of where he wants to develop. However, when Jonas refuses to give up his deed, Stiles hunts him down and shoots him, but not before Jonas hands the deed off to Daniel for safe keeping.

With Jonas in critical condition and unable to farm, his land is put at risk. Upset, Daniel runs out to hide in his father's boat and cries himself to sleep. The ropes holding the boat come undone and Daniel drifts downstream.

When Daniel awakes, he discovers that the boat had washed up in the deserts of Texas. After a brief encounter with some thieves, Daniel is rescued by legendary cowboy Pecos Bill. The duo later team up with lumberjack Paul Bunyan, and strong African-American ex-slave John Henry. He even uses Babe the Blue Ox to free them after they were arrested for a bar fight by Pecos' ex-girlfriend, Calamity Jane. Afterwards, the heroes soon become involved in an increasingly bitter and boisterous fight against Stiles' men as the developer's plan to buy up land threatens the very strength of the folk heroes and the well-being of the common people.

Stiles catches up to Daniel, with his men having subdued Pecos, Paul, and John. He entices Daniel to give up the deed by filling him with doubts about the heroes. Daniel then sees a vision of the Paradise Valley inhabitants, including his father, being forced to help with Stiles' development.

Just then, Daniel wakes up in the boat realizing it was just a dream with the ropes having not come undone. He ventures towards Stiles' train who is exiting a tunnel through the mountains into Paradise Valley. Daniel confronts Stiles, the railroad magnate, and Stiles' henchmen as they attempt to run him over, until John arrives and holds the train. Stiles orders his men to kill them, but Pecos arrives and shoots off their trigger fingers, and the townsfolk join in to help, while Paul, who went inside while nobody noticed, cuts down the tunnel's support poles. Daniel then finishes off the last pole, killing Stiles and his men in the resulting cave-in and the crowd cheers for him.

Daniel then returns to the farm and admits to his recuperated dad that the stories were true and their land is important. Paul, Babe, John, his mule Cold Molasses, and Pecos show up to say goodbye to Daniel. As Paul and John disappear with their animals, Pecos leaves his horse Widow-Maker to Daniel and twirls his lasso at a twister for his departure as Jonas witnesses it.

== Cast ==
- Scott Glenn as J.P. Stiles
- Oliver Platt as Paul Bunyan
- Nick Stahl as Daniel Hackett
- Stephen Lang as Jonas Hackett
- Roger Aaron Brown as John Henry
- Jared Harris as "Pug", Head Thug
- Catherine O'Hara as Calamity Jane
- Patrick Swayze as Pecos Bill
- Moira Harris as Sarah Hackett
- Joseph Grifasi as a man in a top hat
- John P. Ryan as "Grub"
- Scott Wilson as Zeb
- Bert Kramer as Bronson
- Sal Jenco as Big Jim
- William H. Macy as The Railroad Magnate (uncredited)
- Burgess Meredith as An Old Man (uncredited)
- Thomas J. Connolly MD as Bully Boy #1 (uncredited)

== Production ==
Caravan Pictures optioned the spec script for Tall Tale by the two writers Steven L. Bloom and Robert Rodat for $200,000 with a reported purchase price of $650,000-$750,000 in March 1993. Producer Joe Roth then offered the script to director Jeremiah S. Chechik who accepted as he was intrigued by the underlying themes of "the end" of the Old West with the advent of industrialization, and likened the film to The Wizard of Oz in how it played to adults as well as children.

In August 1993, Patrick Swayze and Scott Glenn both joined the film.

Principal photography began on September 12, 1993. Filming locations included the California sites of Disney Ranch and Melody Ranch in Santa Clarita, Fillmore, and Barstow, as well as Vasquez Rocks State Park near Agua Dulce. Other locations included Roaring Fork Valley in Colorado, Utah's Monument Valley and San Juan River, and Lake Powell and Glen Canyon in Arizona. Filming was completed two months later on December 16.

== Release ==
=== Marketing ===
A promotional tie-in for the film was arranged with Subway.

=== Box office ===
Tall Tale was released in theaters on March 24, 1995. The film flopped domestically and worldwide, and did not make back its $32,000,000 budget. It made $3,046,181 in its opening weekend in the United States, ranking fifth at the US box office, behind other openers Major Payne and Dolores Claiborne. It eventually grossed $8,247,627 in the United States and Canada. The film had more success in the home video market.

=== Critical reception ===
Tall Tale has a 48% rating on review aggregator website Rotten Tomatoes with an average rating of 5.9/10 based on 21 reviews. The critics' consensus reads: "Tall Tale draws on American folk legends for a family-friendly adventure with disappointingly little appeal". Audiences polled by CinemaScore gave the film an average grade of "A−" on an A+ to F scale.

Ed Hulse of Entertainment Weekly gave the film a B+, writing: "The exquisitely photographed landscapes pull you out of your living room and into the grandeur of the West". Roger Ebert of The Chicago Sun-Times gave the film a 3 out of 4 stars and described it as "a warm-blooded, high-spirited family adventure film".

Joe Leydon of Variety also gave a positive review, stating the "pic is impressively larger than life, both in physical scale and heroic action. And while the pacing could be brisker during its slightly flabby midsection, it works its way up to a dandy crowd-pleasing climax". Leydon praised Swayze's performance as Pecos Bill and said Glenn "makes a splendidly wicked villain". Leydon also admitted the film might have a hard time finding an audience because kids may not be as familiar with the stories of Pecos Bill, John Henry, and Paul Bunyan.

In a negative review, Rita Kempley of The Washington Post wrote: "Mickey's minions herein transform three of America's rootin'est, tootin'est frontier superheroes into politically and ecologically corrected pablum-spewing icons for our time. Aimed at kids more attuned to the niceties of the Mighty Morphin Power Rangers, this action adventure portrays the first of the forest-levelers, Paul Bunyan (Oliver Platt), as a benign Brobdingnagian tree-hugger".

== Home media ==
Disney released Tall Tale on VHS on August 15, 1995 from Walt Disney Home Video. It was also released on DVD on August 26, 2008. It is also included on Disney's streaming service, Disney+.
