= Roger Birnbaum =

American film producer

- Born: November 14, 1950 (age 75); Teaneck, New Jersey, U.S.
- Occupations: Film producer; television producer
- Spouse(s): Pamela West (m. 1986?; div. 2010?); Leslie Lopez (m. 2013; div. 2019) Lorraine Kelly (m. 2024)
- Partner: Teri Garr (1979–1983)
- Children: 1

Roger Birnbaum (born November 14, 1950) is an American film producer and television producer.

== Early life ==
Birnbaum was born to a Jewish family in Teaneck, New Jersey, the son of Arlene (née Steinlauf) and Norman Birnbaum. His father was a World War II veteran who went into the embroidery business with his father after the war, and used his profits in 1967 to build the Stonehenge, a residential building in New Jersey. Birnbaum graduated from Teaneck High School in 1968 and attended the University of Denver.

== Career ==
Birnbaum started out in the music industry at Arista Records working under Clive Davis. A&M Records brought him out to Hollywood becoming its West Coast A&R executive, where he switch over to film. While working at film, he was appointed president of Fair Dinkum Productions, which was headed by Henry Winkler, who supervised Young Sherlock Holmes and The Sure Thing. He worked at United Artists, Guber-Peters Co. (president in 1989) then 20th Century Fox. He was president of production at 20th Century Fox by 1992.

Caravan Pictures was founded by Birnbaum and Joe Roth as a production company at Disney in 1992 to fill the Disney Studios' then-yearly 50 to 60 production and distribution slots. Birnbaum previously left Caravan at the prompting of then Disney studio chief Joe Roth as Disney was cutting its yearly production output and shutting down Caravan. In August 1998, Birnbaum with Gary Barber, former vice chairman and COO of Morgan Creek Productions founded Spyglass Entertainment.

On December 20, 2010, after the Metro-Goldwyn-Mayer had emerged from bankruptcy, Birnbaum and Barber became co-Chairs and co-CEOs of the studio. On October 3, 2012, Birnbaum announced his intention to exit his role as an MGM executive and return to "hands-on" producing. He will remain with the studio to produce films on "an exclusive basis".

He has since founded four production companies, Pin High Productions, Cave 76 Productions, with Eli Roth, Arts District Entertainment and with Mark Kimsey, Electromagnetic Productions. By September 8, 2016, his exclusivity with MGM had ended.

== Personal life ==
His first wife was Pamela West; they had one daughter. He then married Leslie Lopez in 2013. Birnbaum and Lopez divorced in 2019. He was previously in a seven-year relationship with actress Teri Garr. In 2024 he married Lorraine Kelly.

== Filmography ==
=== Film ===
Producer

- The Sure Thing (1985)
- The Three Musketeers (1993)
- Angels in the Outfield (1994)
- A Low Down Dirty Shame (1994)
- Houseguest (1995)
- The Jerky Boys: The Movie (1995)
- Heavyweights (1995)
- Tall Tale (1995)
- While You Were Sleeping (1995)
- The Big Green (1995)
- Powder (1995)
- Celtic Pride (1996)
- First Kid (1996)
- The Rich Man's Wife (1996)
- Metro (1997)
- Grosse Pointe Blank (1997)
- Gone Fishin' (1997)
- G.I. Jane (1997)
- Washington Square (1997)
- RocketMan (1997)
- Six Days, Seven Nights (1998)
- Simon Birch (1998)
- Rush Hour (1998)
- Holy Man (1998)
- Inspector Gadget (1999)
- Shanghai Noon (2000)
- Rush Hour 2 (2001)
- The Count of Monte Cristo (2002)
- Dragonfly (2002)
- Abandon (2002)
- Reign of Fire (2002)
- The Recruit (2003)
- Shanghai Knights (2003)
- The Perfect Score (2004)
- Connie and Carla (2004)
- Mr. 3000 (2004)
- The Pacifier (2005)
- The Hitchhiker's Guide to the Galaxy (2005)
- The Lookout (2007)
- The Invisible (2007)
- Evan Almighty (2007)
- Rush Hour 3 (2007)
- Underdog (2007)
- Balls of Fury (2007)
- 27 Dresses (2008)
- Flash of Genius (2008)
- Four Christmases (2008)
- Leap Year (2010)
- The Tourist (2010)
- The Vow (2012)
- The Magnificent Seven (2016)
- Death Wish (2018)
- The Hustle (2019)
- South of Heaven (2021)
- Thanksgiving (2023)
- Absolution (2024)

Executive producer

- Who's That Girl (1987)
- Angie (1994)
- Before and After (1996)
- Maximum Risk (1996)
- The Beautician and the Beast (1997)
- Overnight Delivery (1997) (Direct-to-video)
- Keeping the Faith (2000)
- Unbreakable (2000)
- Out Cold (2001)
- Inspector Gadget 2 (2003) (Direct-to-video)
- Bruce Almighty (2003)
- One Love (2003)
- Seabiscuit (2003)
- The Legend of Zorro (2005)
- Memoirs of a Geisha (2005)
- Eight Below (2006)
- Stay Alive (2006)
- Stick It (2006)
- Welcome Home Roscoe Jenkins (2008)
- The Ruins (2008)
- The Happening (2008)
- Wanted (2008)
- The Love Guru (2008)
- Ghost Town (2008)
- G.I. Joe: The Rise of Cobra (2009)
- Invictus (2009)
- Dinner for Schmucks (2010)
- No Strings Attached (2011)
- Footloose (2011)
- G.I. Joe: Retaliation (2013)
- RoboCop (2014)
- Glass (2019)
- Know Your Enemy (2019)

Special thanks

- Rain Man (1988)
- Dead Presidents (1995)
- Above Suspicion (2019)

Acting role

Year	Film	Role	Notes
1998	Making Sandwiches	Hollywood Type	Short film

=== Television ===
Executive producer
Year	Title	Notes
1984	CBS Schoolbreak Special	
1985	Happily Ever After	TV movie
1987	Bay Coven	TV movie
1997	Angels in the Endzone	TV movie
1997	Flash	TV movie
2000	Angels in the Infield	TV movie
2003	Miracles	
2003	Criminology 101	TV movie
2004	The Ranch	TV movie
2004	Weekends	TV movie

Producer
Year	Title	Notes
1983	Ryan's Four	
1983	When Your Lover Leaves	TV movie
1985	Scandal Sheet	TV movie

Production manager
Year	Title	Role	Notes
1979	Music for UNICEF Concert	Executive in charge of production	TV special
1979	The Bee Gees Special	Executive in charge of production	TV special
