= The Rich Man's Wife =

- Original poster
- Directed by: Amy Holden Jones
- Written by: Amy Holden Jones
- Produced by: Julie Bergman Sender; Roger Birnbaum; Rashida Acharya
- Starring: Halle Berry; Peter Greene; Clive Owen; Christopher McDonald
- Cinematography: Haskell Wexler
- Edited by: Wendy Greene Bricmont; Glenn Garland
- Music by: John Frizzell; Main theme by James Newton Howard
- Production companies: Hollywood Pictures; Caravan Pictures; Roger Birnbaum Productions
- Distributed by: Buena Vista Pictures Distribution
- Release date: September 13, 1996
- Running time: 95 minutes
- Country: United States
- Language: English
- Box office: $8,543,587

The Rich Man's Wife is a 1996 American thriller film written and directed by Amy Holden Jones and starring Halle Berry. The title character (Berry) becomes a suspect when her husband (Christopher McDonald) is murdered and the investigating detectives are suspicious of her alibi. The film was released on September 13, 1996.

== Plot ==
Josie Potenza is the trophy wife of workaholic Hollywood producer Tony Potenza, but their marriage is crumbling due to his increased drinking resulting from stress at work. She convinces him to join her for a romantic getaway at a secluded lakeside cabin, but when it becomes obvious his concerns about the studio are going to take precedence over relaxation, she begrudgingly tells him to return home but decides to stay on her own for a few days.

Josie sees Cole Wilson ogling her at a local bar and, uncomfortable with the unwanted attention, she leaves. Her Jeep breaks down on a dark, secluded country road and as she starts to hike to the cabin, Cole pulls up in his truck and offers her a lift. He convinces her he is harmless and when he extends an invitation to dinner the following night, Josie accepts.

As they linger over drinks after dinner, Josie discusses her unhappy marriage. Although there are problems, and she sometimes fantasizes about her husband's death, she is grateful to Tony for all he has given her and still has hopes for their future. Cole becomes aggressive and she resists his advances. During the drive back to the cabin, he turns off his headlights and begins to drive erratically, and Josie becomes hysterical. When he tries to force himself on her, Josie fires a gun she found in a kitchen drawer and grazes his face with the bullet. Vowing revenge, Cole leaves.

With the passing of time, Tony stops drinking and he and Josie successfully work at repairing their damaged marriage. On the way home one rainy night, he stops at an ATM, and Cole conceals himself in the back seat of his car. He forces him to drive to a secluded park and shoots him numerous times, then goes to Josie's home and reveals he has killed her husband. He warns her if she reports him to the police he will tell them she hired him to murder Tony, and demands $30,000 for his silence. When the police question Josie she says nothing about Cole's involvement, but her story - or lack of one - makes detective Dan Fredricks suspicious, and his African American partner Ron Lewis accuses him of suspecting Josie simply because she is black and her husband was white.

Josie tells her lover, struggling restaurateur Jake Golden that she knows the identity of Tony's killer but he warns her not to reveal anything. He has an ulterior motive - Jake, desperate for money to finance his failing business when his partner Tony bailed out, had hired Cole to kill Tony so Josie would be free to marry him and he could benefit from her wealth. Complications arise when attorney Bill Adolphe tells Josie all her husband's assets were in his name and he died intestate. All his accounts have been frozen and Josie will have to wait an undetermined amount of time for the court to supervise probate.

While Jake's ex-wife Nora tries to convince the police he may have killed Tony, Josie becomes the target of the increasingly deranged Cole. After killing Jake, he traps her in her garage and Josie kills him in the ensuing skirmish. Josie pleads self defense, and when Nora tells them she doesn't believe Josie is clever enough to have masterminded any of the events that have transpired, the police let her go, unaware the two women are partners in crime.

== Cast ==
- Halle Berry as Josie Potenza
- Peter Greene as Cole Wilson
- Clive Owen as Jake Golden
- Christopher McDonald as Tony Potenza
- Frankie Faison as Detective Ron Lewis
- Charles Hallahan as Detective Dan Fredricks
- Clea Lewis as Nora Golden
- Allan Rich as Bill Adolphe

== Critical reception ==
The Rich Man's Wife received negative reviews from critics. The film holds a 13% rating on Rotten Tomatoes from 15 reviews.

Roger Ebert of the Chicago Sun-Times observed, "The movie proceeds more or less satisfactorily for 94 minutes, and then in the last 60 seconds expects us to revise everything we thought we knew, or guessed, or figured out - just because of an arbitrary ending.". He praises the dialogue and the character development, but criticizes the discontinuity of the ending which abruptly negates the previous plot development.

Lawrence van Gelder of The New York Times said, "The film owes no little debt to Alfred Hitchcock's thriller Strangers on a Train and to all those movies in which homicidal maniacs pop up unexpectedly, lone women hear creaking doors and ominous footsteps, thunderstorms erupt at convenient moments and couples who share disturbing confidences speed along dark, deserted roads while windshield wipers sweep across close-ups of their tense faces. Rich Man's Wife also owes a debt to its audience, whose credibility is sorely taxed at turning points where sensible individuals would disagree with Josie's actions."

Calling the film "a passable genre piece with weird plot twists and mediocre acting from the gorgeous Berry," Edward Guthmann of the San Francisco Chronicle compared it to "the old Lana Turner melodramas with the glossy sets, soft-focus photography and operatic emotional range." He continued, "Jones serves this slice of ham with slick direction and Haskell Wexler's handsome photography, and keeps twisting the plot and our presumptions right up to the final scene. It's diverting, good-looking trash, and it might be more defensible if Berry were genuinely talented and didn't have such a thin, high-school-cheerleader voice."

Barbara Shulgasser of the San Francisco Examiner felt the only reason to see the film "is to watch a charming actress called Clea Lewis . . . play a wronged ex-wife and steal the show in two short scenes. The rest of the movie is so cluttered with old plot twists and a lame attempt at what the filmmakers must have thought would be a surprise ending that the dialogue was drowned out half the time by audience members pleading with characters not to do the same dumb things we've all seen movie characters do hundreds of times before in equally bad movies . . . Writer-director Amy Holden Jones has written other ridiculous scripts before, including the one for Indecent Proposal, but she directed the laudable Jamie Lee Curtis vehicle Love Letters, so there really is no excuse for the sheer ineptitude of this movie."

Godfrey Cheshire of Variety said, "Thrills have seldom seemed as routine as they do in The Rich Man's Wife, a lady-and-the-psycho yarn so generic it might have been constructed by computer printout . . . Although her script is the source of the film's hackneyed feel, Jones' direction is generally top-drawer. Beyond her work with the supporting cast, she provides a polished, fluid look and proves especially effective at mounting punchy, visceral action scenes."

During a 2019 appearance on The Late Late Show with James Corden, Berry was asked if she had ever realized a film was going to be poorly received during filming. She cited The Rich Man's Wife, saying: "I kinda knew it wasn't gonna be the greatest cinematic experience for the people. You go into these movies always with the best intentions. [...] Then sometimes you get on the set and you realize, 'What, was I high when I agreed to do this?'"
