= Holy Man =

1998 film by Stephen Herek

- Theatrical release poster
- Directed by: Stephen Herek
- Written by: Tom Schulman
- Produced by: Roger Birnbaum; Stephen Herek
- Starring: Eddie Murphy; Jeff Goldblum; Kelly Preston; Robert Loggia; Jon Cryer
- Cinematography: Adrian Biddle
- Edited by: Trudy Ship
- Music by: Alan Silvestri
- Production companies: Touchstone Pictures; Caravan Pictures; Roger Birnbaum Productions
- Distributed by: Buena Vista Pictures Distribution
- Release date: October 9, 1998
- Running time: 113 minutes
- Country: United States
- Language: English
- Budget: $60 million
- Box office: $27 million

Holy Man is a 1998 American satirical comedy-drama film directed by Stephen Herek, written by Tom Schulman, and starring Eddie Murphy, Jeff Goldblum, Kelly Preston, Robert Loggia and Jon Cryer. The film was produced by Touchstone Pictures, Caravan Pictures and Roger Birnbaum Productions and released on October 9, 1998 by Buena Vista Pictures Distribution. Holy Man grossed $27 million worldwide against a $60 million budget and received mixed-to-negative reviews from critics.

== Plot ==
Ricky Hayman and Kate Newell work at the Good Buy Shopping Network, a home shopping channel run by John McBainbridge. Sales have been down over the last two years under Ricky's management, and Kate was brought in to come up with new ideas.

Ricky views Kate as a threat, and she expresses her dislike for him as well. However, John has given Ricky an ultimatum to increase sales or lose his job. While out driving, Ricky and Kate come across a charismatic man who calls himself "G,” wears white robes, and is perpetually happy and smiling. He seems to sense how troubled Ricky is and follows them back to the Good Buy studio.

G wanders onto the set of an infomercial, and while he is on the air, the number of calls with customers wanting to buy something increases. Kate notices and gets G a spot on the network selling items. Meanwhile, the dislike between Ricky and Kate fades, and they express romantic interest in each other.

G's infomercials are mostly spontaneous anecdotes or thoughts about life, but customers connect with him and items begin selling out. While staying at Ricky's house, he encounters a party of businessmen and displays his talents by making a Rolex watch "disappear" and curing a man of his fear of flying. Ricky begins marketing G's name on other items to increase sales. He wants to give G his own show, but the stressful work environment and throngs of fans who want to meet G take a toll.

G is no longer the happy, inspiring man he once was, and when Kate tries to convince John to let G leave the network, he refuses and she quits out of contempt. Ricky reaps the benefits of the increased sales, receiving a large promotion and a new office. However, the rewards seem hollow due to G's lethargy and Kate's rejection of him.

On the night of the premiere of G's new show, Ricky decides that letting G go is the right choice and announces his decision live on air. Kate hears and forgives Ricky, racing back to the studio to be with him. They have a romantic reunion on the air, and the show is ended. Afterwards, Ricky and Kate say their goodbyes to the fully recovered G, who wanders into the distance to continue his pilgrimage.

== Cast ==
- Eddie Murphy as G
- Jeff Goldblum as Ricky Hayman
- Kelly Preston as Kate Newell
- Robert Loggia as John McBainbridge
- Jon Cryer as Barry
- Eric McCormack as Scott Hawkes
- Jennifer Bini Taylor as Hot Tub Girl
- Adriana Cataño as Television hostess
- Eugene Levy as Guy on background television (uncredited)

Morgan Fairchild, Betty White, Florence Henderson, James Brown, Soupy Sales, Dan Marino, Willard Scott, Nick Santa Maria and Nino Cerruti appear as themselves.

== Production ==
According to Splitsider, John Candy was signed on for the role played by Eddie Murphy back in 1993, a year before Candy's death.

== Reception ==
=== Box office ===
Holy Man was a box office disappointment, as it grossed $12,069,719 in the United States and Canada and $27 million worldwide, compared to its budget of over $60 million.

=== Critical response ===
On Rotten Tomatoes, 12% of 50 critics gave the film a positive review, with an average rating of 3.8/10. The website's consensus states: "Cloying and unfunny, Holy Man wastes the repartee between Eddie Murphy and Jeff Goldblum on the gospel of toothless satire and unearned sentimentality." On Metacritic, it has a weighted average score of 42 out of 100 based on reviews from 19 critics, indicating "mixed or average" reviews. Roger Ebert for the Chicago Sun Times gave it 2 out of 4 stars, calling Murphy's character "an uninteresting enigma" and criticizing the film for being too credulous and missing opportunities for satire. Audiences polled by CinemaScore gave the film an average grade of "C+" on an A+ to F scale.

In June 2009, Murphy referred to Holy Man as a "horrendous movie". Although he did not identify the film by name, he mentioned it on The Tonight Show with Conan O'Brien as a reference to the film he starred in featuring a cameo with singer James Brown. In November 2011, on Late Night with Jimmy Fallon, Murphy outright called Holy Man a horrendous movie, though he later backtracked and said, "It's not that bad, but it's pretty bad." In 2025, Murphy reiterated that Holy Man was among the worst films of his career, describing it as "soft" and stating that it was ultimately not a good picture.
