= Metro (1997 film) =

1997 film directed by Thomas Carter

- Theatrical film poster
- Directed by: Thomas Carter
- Written by: Randy Feldman
- Produced by: Roger Birnbaum
- Starring: Eddie Murphy; Michael Rapaport; Michael Wincott; Carmen Ejogo
- Cinematography: Fred Murphy
- Edited by: Peter E. Berger; John Wright
- Music by: Steve Porcaro
- Production companies: Touchstone Pictures; Caravan Pictures; Roger Birnbaum Productions
- Distributed by: Buena Vista Pictures Distribution
- Release date: January 17, 1997
- Running time: 118 minutes
- Country: United States
- Language: English
- Budget: $55 million
- Box office: $74 million

Metro is a 1997 American action thriller film directed by Thomas Carter, written by Randy Feldman, and produced by Roger Birnbaum. It stars Eddie Murphy, Michael Rapaport, Carmen Ejogo and Michael Wincott. The plot follows Scott Roper (Murphy), a hostage negotiator and inspector for the San Francisco Police Department who seeks revenge against a psychotic jewel thief, Michael Korda (Wincott), who murdered Roper's best friend. Metro was produced by Touchstone Pictures, Caravan Pictures and Roger Birnbaum Productions and released on January 17, 1997 by Buena Vista Pictures Distribution in the United States and grossed $74 million worldwide against a $55 million budget despite negative reviews.

== Plot ==
SFPD Inspector Scott Roper is the best hostage negotiator in his department. He is called in to deal with a bank robber, Earl, demanding a getaway vehicle and police escort. He manages to defuse the situation, shooting Earl non-fatally in the shoulder and rescuing the hostages.

That night, Scott accompanies his friend and former partner, Lt. Sam Baffert, to the apartment of Michael Korda, a jewel thief involved in Baffert's investigation. After Sam questions Korda about his involvement, Korda stabs him to death and leaves his corpse inside an elevator for Scott to find. Despite Scott demanding to go after Korda, Captain Frank Solis refuses to let him take the case due to the probable conflict of interest. Scott resolves to bring Korda to justice, but in the meantime he must adjust to his new partner, SWAT sharpshooter Kevin McCall.

Scott and Kevin are called to a hostage situation at a downtown jewelry store, with Korda as the hostage taker. During initial negotiations, Scott was able to speak to Korda, whom he did not recognize as he wore a mask during their interaction. When Scott later recognized him, the latter grabs a hostage and makes a getaway in a truck, but not before the SWAT team accidentally shot one of the hostages who was mistakenly identified as the hostage taker, after being made to wear a mask by Korda. Scott and Kevin use Solis' car to pursue him. Korda wrecks the truck, and boards a cable car, shooting the operator in the process. Scott and Kevin manage to stop the cable car and chase Korda into a parking garage, where they apprehend him.

During visitation at the jail with his cousin Clarence Teal, Korda orders Teal to murder Ronnie Tate, Scott's ex-girlfriend, as a way to seek revenge on Scott. Teal attacks Ronnie at her apartment, but Scott intervenes and chases Teal down the fire escape, where, after a chase, Teal is struck and killed by a passing car. A furious Scott visits Korda in jail and warns him to stay away from Ronnie, showing him an autopsy picture of Teal, which enrages Korda.

The next morning, Korda escapes from the jail and kidnaps Ronnie, leading Scott and Kevin into a confrontation at an abandoned shipyard. Korda threatens to kill Ronnie by decapitating her on the cutting machine she is pinned to if Scott does not follow his instructions. Korda charges toward Scott in a sports car, but is shot from a vantage point by Kevin, causing him to swerve and crash through the warehouse entrance. Scott frees Ronnie, while Kevin engages Korda in a shootout where the former is shot in the upper leg. Korda tries to retreat in Scott's truck, but Scott fights for control of it. Scott leaps out of the way while Korda, who is unable to escape due to Scott ramming a steel pipe into the door and on the gas pedal continues on, trapped in the truck. As Korda struggles to get the door open, the truck crashes into a stack of explosive barrels and Korda is killed in a massive explosion. The movie finishes with Scott and Ronnie relaxing on vacation at a Tahitian beach resort.

== Cast ==
- Eddie Murphy as Inspector Scott Roper
- Michael Rapaport as Inspector Kevin McCall
- Michael Wincott as Michael Korda
- Carmen Ejogo as Veronica "Ronnie" Tate
- Denis Arndt as Captain Frank Solis
- Art Evans as Lieutenant Sam Baffert
- Kim Miyori as Inspector Eiko Kimura
- Paul Ben-Victor as Clarence Teal
- Donal Logue as Earl
- James Carpenter as Officer Forbes
- James Mongey as Bank Hostage

== Production ==
In February 1995, Caravan Pictures bought the script for Metro in a preemptive bid of $1 million. Eddie Murphy entered negotiations for the lead role in May 1995.

Murphy was interested in making a film that was edgier than his previous comedies while retaining some of the humor of his earlier action films. Director Thomas Carter first met Murphy on the set of The Nutty Professor, while Murphy was in makeup as Sherman Klump. Carter recalled that the two shared similar ideas about the Metro script and believed that the film would give Murphy an opportunity to display both his dramatic and comedic abilities.

Producer Roger Birnbaum said that he and Murphy agreed to play the dramatic aspects of the story seriously and allow the humor to occur naturally. According to Birnbaum, this approach made Scott Roper "perhaps the most realistic character Eddie has ever played on screen". Carter similarly said that the mixture of drama and comedy was one of the main reasons he was attracted to the project.

Murphy described Metro as the most physically demanding role he had performed at that point in his career: "This is the most physical role I've done in a movie. I tip my hat to Stallone, Schwarzenegger and Bruce Willis—I don't know how they can do movies like this all the time, because you really get beat up doing them. But it's great when you finally see the results up on screen. We had a lot of fun doing this."

Michael Rapaport, who had been a fan of Murphy since childhood, said that working with him fulfilled a longtime ambition. Murphy praised Rapaport as "one of the best" actors of his generation and said that working with him "brought out the best" in his own performance.

Carmen Ejogo, then relatively unknown to American audiences, was cast as Ronnie Tate after casting director Ellen Chenoweth recorded an audition with her. Carter subsequently encouraged Birnbaum to meet Ejogo in New York. Birnbaum said he was "blown away by her beauty, charm and talent", while Carter felt that her British background provided an interesting contrast with Murphy.

Carter also praised Michael Wincott's performance as Korda, describing the character as "fun and scary and ruthless and brutal" while maintaining "an air of sophistication". Murphy similarly praised Wincott's performance, saying, "Michael's a wonderful actor and is always excellent. He plays deviant real well."

Murphy praised Carter's direction, calling him a "perfectionist" and saying that he "got something totally unique out of me as an actor". Carter and cinematographer Fred Murphy sought to combine a more artistic visual style with the conventions of an action thriller. According to Carter, Fred Murphy had never previously photographed an action film.

== Release ==
=== Box office ===
The movie debuted with $9.3 million. Metro eventually brought in $32,000,301 in the United States and Canada and grossed $42.4 million internationally for a worldwide gross of $74.4 million compared to its $55 million budget.

=== Reception ===
On the review aggregator website Rotten Tomatoes, 17% of 35 critics' reviews are positive. Metacritic, which uses a weighted average, assigned the film a score of 41 out of 100, based on 27 critics, indicating "mixed or average" reviews.

Roger Ebert gave the film a favorable review; he said "[t]he big action scenes are cleverly staged and Eddie Murphy is back on his game again, with a high-energy performance and crisp dialogue." A negative review came from Stephen Holden of The New York Times, who called the film "aimless" and stated that "[t]he vehicular pirouettes and ski jumps are so exaggerated that they correspond neither to the urban geography nor to the laws of physics. And the jiggling camera can't blur the careless mechanical stitching in a sequence that tries to make up for in length what it lacks in inventiveness. After all, when you've seen one spinning car, haven't you seen them all? And hasn't this demolition derby been staged several times before on the same streets with infinitely more pizazz and zest for destruction?" Michael Wilmington agreed, saying "If it weren't for all the jokes [...] the movie might be unintentionally funny," and that "For most of the people who made "Metro," shamelessness is probably a virtue, like good muscle tone. At the end, writer Feldman has actually dreamed up a variation on the old silent movie chestnut, where the mustache-twirling villain has the heroine tied to a sawmill plank. I'm not even sure this scene is intended humorously; the actors and director all milk it dry. And, except for Murphy's rapid-fire badinage, "Metro" has the kind of writing that suggests a mind filled with heroines tied to sawmill planks."

Padraig Cotter from Screen Rant ranked Metro number four out of the nine Eddie Murphy action films, explaining that "Metro feels like the kind of grounded, mature thriller Murphy tried (and failed) to make with Beverly Hills Cop III. It runs through many of the clichés of the genre but offers enough tweaks to keep them interesting." Bill Coswell from Laughing Place praised the film's dialogue and the performances of Murphy and Wincott, while criticizing the plot as "riddled with action movie cliches" and describing the scene where Korda breaks out of jail as laughably preposterous.

Audiences polled by CinemaScore gave the film an average grade of "B+" on an A+ to F scale.

== Director and cast response ==
Director Thomas Carter later said that making Metro an R-rated film was one of the biggest mistakes of his career. He believed the rating had hurt the film’s chances at the box office. About working with Eddie Murphy, Carmen Ejogo said: "He was utterly charming but... did he tell me this? He gets told, "There's this script, it's a bit shitty, are you interested?" "No, not really." "Well, you know, we're going to give you $30 million to do it." "Yeah, all right then." And that's where he's at. He's not doing it to be the next Poitier. It is what it is for him, and that's what he's like on set. He's just showing up and getting paid, whereas I was like, "What's the motivation here?"" Michael Rapaport was also disappointed with the film, calling it “wack” on his podcast. He said that he and Murphy had wanted more of their banter in the film, but Carter had other ideas. “He thought he was making Seven,” Rapaport recalled, referring to the 1995 thriller starring Brad Pitt and Morgan Freeman. Murphy, however, said he liked Metro. During a 2006 appearance on Inside the Actors Studio, he was asked about several poorly received projects, including Metro, Vampire in Brooklyn (1995) and The PJs(1999–2001). “I don’t think those things sucked. I like Metro,” he said, adding that not everything was for everybody and that “timing is everything”.
