= RocketMan (1997 film) =

1997 film by Stuart Gillard

- Theatrical release poster
- Directed by: Stuart Gillard
- Written by: Oren Aviv; Craig Mazin; Greg Erb
- Produced by: Roger Birnbaum
- Starring: Harland Williams; Jessica Lundy; William Sadler; Jeffrey DeMunn; Beau Bridges
- Cinematography: Steven Poster
- Edited by: William D. Gordean
- Music by: Michael Tavera
- Production companies: Walt Disney Pictures; Caravan Pictures; Roger Birnbaum Productions
- Distributed by: Buena Vista Pictures Distribution
- Release date: October 10, 1997
- Running time: 95 minutes
- Country: United States
- Language: English
- Box office: $15.4 million

RocketMan (also written as Rocket Man) is a 1997 American comic science fiction film produced by Walt Disney Pictures and Caravan Pictures, and distributed by Buena Vista Pictures Distribution. Directed by Stuart Gillard, it stars Harland Williams, Jessica Lundy, William Sadler, and Jeffrey DeMunn.

The film was released on October 10, 1997. It received negative reviews from critics and grossed $15.4 million.

== Plot ==
NASA is training for the first human mission to Mars, which will involve the spacecraft Aries. Because of a supposed glitch in the computer navigation system, NASA looks for the original programmer of the software to understand why it seems to be broken. Fred Z. Randall, the eccentric and clumsy programmer who wrote the software, meets Paul Wick, the flight director of the Mars mission; William "Wild Bill" Overbeck, the commander of the Mars mission; and astronaut Gary Hackman, the computer specialist. Fred looks at the software and discovers that the problem actually stems from a mathematical error made by Gary. After a display of hard-headed stubbornness, Gary is hit in the head by a model of the Pilgrim 1 Mars lander, suffering a skull fracture. NASA decides to replace him instead of delaying the mission. Fred is brought to NASA to see whether he has what it takes to be an astronaut. He goes through a series of exercises and does well, even going so far as to break every record that Overbeck had set. In the end, Fred gets the job.

While getting ready to board the Aries, Fred chickens out and refuses to go on the mission. Bud Nesbitt, who Wick claims caused the Apollo 13 accident (though Bud later reveals that Wick was responsible), tells Fred about three commemorative coins given to him by President Johnson. He gave one coin to Neil Armstrong and another to Jim Lovell. Showing Fred a gold coin reading "Bravery", Bud says, "It hasn't done me much good. Maybe it'll mean something to you." Fred then quotes the Cowardly Lion from The Wizard of Oz.

Fred, Commander Overbeck, geologist Julie Ford, and Ulysses, a trained chimpanzee, board the Aries. Together, they will look for fossils on Mars. While on a video call with the president, Fred inadvertently humiliates Overbeck by leading the global population in singing "He's Got the Whole World in His Hands." To save on resources, crew members are to be put into "hypersleep" for eight months while the ship floats towards Mars. Ulysses purposely takes Fred's hypersleep chamber as his own, and Fred has to sleep in Ulysses' chimp-sized chamber. He sleeps for only 13 minutes and has to stay up alone for eight months. While looking at Mars's weather data, Fred notices severe sandstorms that could endanger the crew. He contacts Bud in Houston and tells him about the storms that are forecast to hit the landing site. If the crew gets caught in the storms, the crew members could be lost forever. Bud tells Wick about the situation, but Wick ignores him. The crew makes it to Mars after Overbeck chides Fred for being awake the whole time and using all the food—except food that the former despises (anchovy paste, creamed liver, and gefilte fish)—for painting. They land the Pilgrim on the Martian surface. As Overbeck prepares to be the first human to step on Mars, Fred slips from the ladder and accidentally lands first, while cementing the first words 'It Wasn't Me!'.

A day after the crew lands, the sandstorms arrive ahead of schedule. After almost losing Overbeck and Ulysses in a sandstorm, the crew lifts off from the Martian surface. Wick is replaced by Bud when it becomes clear that Wick does not trust his NASA crew. The ship has almost escaped the sandstorm when rocks kicked up by wind hit the lander. Pilgrim 1 loses power and begins to spin out of control. Fred has to rewire the entire system, reboot it, and power everything back up in less than two minutes, or the ship will crash. With less than 20 seconds, he has to complete the circuit. He frantically searches for something and finally shoves the commemorative coin into the slot, allowing the lander to regain power. The crew safely returns to the Aries, which is orbiting Mars. Fred asks Julie to dance with him in zero gravity. He wears a silver tuxedo, and she wears a gold dress made from space blankets that he cut up during his accident with the sleep pod.

As Fred gets ready for hypersleep one last time, Ulysses once again takes Fred's hypersleep chamber and Fred yells in anguish as the Aries begins its eight month journey back to Earth. In a post-credits scene, the crew's flag pole on Mars is shown missing its flag. It is revealed that Fred's American flag boxers, which were earlier used as a replacement for the original flag, have been stolen and worn by a Martian.

== Cast ==
- Harland Williams as Fred Z. Randall, an eccentric but brilliant software programmer whose sole dream was to go to space
- Jessica Lundy as Julie Ford, an astronaut and the geologist and chimpanzee handler for the Mars Mission who caught Fred's eye
- William Sadler as William "Wild Bill" Overbeck, an astronaut who is the Commanding Officer of the Mars Mission
- Jeffrey DeMunn as Paul Wick, the flight director of the Mars mission
- James Pickens, Jr. as Ben Stevens, the Director for NASA
- Beau Bridges as Bud Nesbitt, a veteran astronaut since the Apollo 13 mission
- Peter Onorati as Gary Hackman, an astronaut who was the computer scientist for the Mars Mission until he was injured
- Don Lake as Flight Surgeon
- Blake Nelson Boyd as Gordon A. Peacock, an astronaut who Randall competed against to replace Hackman
- Shelley Duvall as Mrs. Randall, Fred's mother
- Gailard Sartain as Mr. Randall, Fred's father

== Production ==
The idea for what would become RocketMan came about from Craig Mazin, who was then an ad copywriter for Walt Disney Studios, and his writing partner Greg Erb. They were brainstorming movie ideas when the idea "What if Apollo 13 starred a goofball instead of Tom Hanks" appeared the most marketable. Mazin presented the idea to his boss Oren Aviv, senior vice president, and marketing/creative director of Buena Vista, with Aviv bringing on Jon Turteltaub as an executive producer who helped set up the film at Caravan Pictures after pitching it to producer and Caravan head Roger Birnbaum. Mazin and Erb were assigned to write the script. Although the two had never written a film before, executives were so impressed with what was submitted that the project was fast-tracked through development.

Harland Williams was cast in the lead role after turning down George of the Jungle. He was dissatisfied with elements of the script and claimed to have rewritten it twice, though he went uncredited. Among his contributions include the extensions of the sound deprivation chamber and g-force scenes, Randall screaming after getting accepted (which Harland based on Miss America Pageants), and the scene where Randall and Julie bond over stars in the sky. Williams felt that the two had no scene where they connected and included it to make their romance more believable.

The film was shot on location at the Lake Point Plaza in Sugar Land, Texas, in a recently constructed building for Fluor Corporation. The building exterior was dressed with NASA signage to give the appearance of shooting at the actual NASA site. The movie was also filmed in Moab, Utah, for scenes on the surface of Mars.

The filmmakers spent nine weeks at the Johnson Space Center, in Houston, Texas, shooting at the famous Rocket Park, the gargantuan Building 9 that houses all of the spacecraft mock-ups for the ongoing shuttle missions, and Building 32, which houses the world's largest thermal vacuum chamber and simulates all conditions of outer space (except zero gravity).

To prepare for their roles as astronauts, the three stars attended the U.S. Space Camp at the U.S. Space & Rocket Center in Huntsville, Alabama, riding in simulators and participating in other activities.

Filming started on September 16, 1996, and wrapped up on November 25.

== Release ==
=== Box office ===
RocketMan opened in theaters on October 10, 1997. It came in at #6 during its opening weekend, grossing $4,472,937. The film's second weekend saw a -33.2% change in attendance, dropping to #7 at the box office, with a gross of $2,987,753. It would drop to #8 at the box office the following weekend with a gross of only $2,074,078. The film dropped out of the top ten during its fourth weekend, coming in at eleventh place with a gross of $1,454,836. It would fail to regain a top ten spot at the box office through the remainder of its theatrical run. By the end of its theatrical run, the film had taken in $15,448,043 in total domestic gross.

=== Home media ===
The film was one of the first Disney titles released on DVD (through a different distribution company, as Disney was not supporting DVD at the time) and soon went out-of-print. In April 2006, the Disney Movie Club began distributing a DVD re-release. On February 27, 2018 Disney Movie Club began distributing a Blu-ray 20th anniversary edition re-release.

== Reception ==
On Rotten Tomatoes, RocketMan has a score of 20% based on 20 reviews, with a weighted average rating of 4.2/10.

Mike Clark of USA Today rated it 1.5 out of 4 stars and called it "One small step for an unknown comic. One giant stumble for comedy-kind." Roger Ebert, a noted film critic, gave the film three out of four stars, calling it "a wacky comedy in the Jerry Lewis-Jim Carrey mold".

== See also ==
- List of films set on Mars
