= The Three Musketeers (1993 film) =

Action-adventure film by Stephen Herek

- Theatrical release poster by John Alvin.
- Directed by: Stephen Herek
- Screenplay by: David Loughery
- Based on: The Three Musketeers; 1844 novel by Alexandre Dumas
- Produced by: Joe Roth; Roger Birnbaum
- Starring: Charlie Sheen; Kiefer Sutherland; Chris O'Donnell; Oliver Platt; Tim Curry; Rebecca De Mornay; Gabrielle Anwar
- Cinematography: Dean Semler
- Edited by: John F. Link
- Music by: Michael Kamen
- Production companies: Walt Disney Pictures; Caravan Pictures
- Distributed by: Buena Vista Pictures Distribution
- Release date: November 12, 1993
- Running time: 105 minutes
- Countries: United States; Austria
- Language: English
- Budget: $30 million
- Box office: $111 million

The Three Musketeers is a 1993 action-adventure comedy film from Walt Disney Pictures and Caravan Pictures, and directed by Stephen Herek from a screenplay by David Loughery. The film is loosely based on the 1844 novel The Three Musketeers (Les Trois Mousquetaires) by Alexandre Dumas. It recounts the adventures of d'Artagnan on his quest to join the three title characters in becoming a musketeer. However, this adaptation simplifies and alters the story. It stars Charlie Sheen, Kiefer Sutherland, Chris O'Donnell, Oliver Platt, Tim Curry and Rebecca De Mornay.

The Three Musketeers was released by Buena Vista Pictures Distribution on November 12, 1993. The film received mixed to negative reviews from critics and grossed $111 million against a $30 million budget.

== Plot ==
In 1625, young-but-skilled fencer d'Artagnan travels to Paris, France in hopes to follow in his murdered father's footsteps and become a member of the musketeers: the personal guard of the King Louis XIII. He is pursued by Girard and his brothers, accused of blemishing their sister's honor. Meanwhile, Captain Rochefort of the Cardinal's Guards disbands the musketeers per the orders of Cardinal Richelieu, the King's Minister, ostensibly to help fight in an impending war with England. Rochefort informs Richelieu that three musketeers refused to relinquish their duties: Athos, Porthos and Aramis.

In Paris, d'Artagnan "rescues" Queen Anne's handmaidens from their own bodyguards, and after a scolding, takes a liking to one, Constance. In the city d'Artagnan encounters each of the Three Musketeers separately, unaware of their identities or association, resulting in a separate duel arranged with each. At the arranged location, Athos, Porthos and Aramis reveal themselves as musketeers. Before their duel, Jussac, a Captain of the Cardinal's Guard, arrives with four other guards to arrest the musketeers; although d'Artagnan is not sought by the guards, he allies with the musketeers during the skirmish. The Musketeers kill four guards, while d'Artagnan outduels Jussac, who falls to his death. Impressed but displeased at d'Artagnan's involvement, the musketeers leave d'Artagnan behind after encouraging him to flee and maintain his innocence. When more of the Cardinal's Guards arrive, d'Artagnan is captured.

D'Artagnan escapes his cell and secretly learns that Richelieu plans to supplant Louis, tasking Milady Sabine de Winter with delivering a secret treaty to England's Duke of Buckingham. D'Artagnan is caught by Rochefort without having seen Milady's face. Richelieu orders him executed for refusing to give up the musketeers' location, but the musketeers rescue him. As they flee, d'Artagnan reveals Richelieu's plans; they decide to intercept the spy at Calais and retrieve the treaty to prove Richelieu's guilt.

During a skirmish, the party splits up; d'Artagnan rides ahead to Calais but passes out from exhaustion and is found by Milady. He wakes in a bed stripped of his weapons and clothes as Milady tries to seduce him. d'Artagnan speaks openly of his plans, not knowing she is the spy. She attempts to kill him but he convinces her to keep him alive. As her party boards the boat to England, they are confronted by the musketeers. Milady attempts to run away but is stopped by Athos, who is revealed to have been her first husband but betrayed her to the authorities when he found out she was branded a murderer. The musketeers retrieve the treaty and Milady is sentenced to death for the murder of her second husband, Lord de Winter; just before she is executed, Athos begs her forgiveness. Moved, she reveals the Cardinal's plans to assassinate Louis at his birthday celebration, then throws herself off a cliff to her death.

Athos, Porthos and Aramis send missives to rally the rest of the musketeers. D'Artagnan interrupts the shot of the sniper hired by Richelieu and Rochefort, which narrowly misses Louis. The musketeers reveal themselves and Richelieu blames them for the attempted assassination. As the three fight the Cardinal's guards, men rush to their aid and reveal themselves as musketeers. The two forces battle as Richelieu takes Louis and Anne hostage, shooting Aramis in the chest before fleeing to the dungeon with Athos and Porthos in pursuit. d'Artagnan duels Rochefort and is disarmed; as Rochefort gloats about having killed d'Artagnan's father, Constance retrieves and throws him his sword and d'Artagnan promptly kills Rochefort.

Athos and Porthos arrive just as Richelieu's boat leaves on an underground river, with Richelieu vowing to return. The boatman then reveals himself as Aramis, his crucifix having stopped the bullet. Aramis moves to apprehend the Cardinal but Louis punches Richelieu himself, knocking him into the river. The musketeers are reinstated by Louis and d'Artagnan is offered anything he wants; he chooses to serve Louis as a musketeer. Outside the musketeer headquarters, Girard and his brothers arrive and challenge d'Artagnan to a duel; Porthos reminds him that musketeers not only protect King and country but also each other. Girard and his brothers are then chased off by the entire musketeer division.

== Cast ==
- Charlie Sheen as Aramis, one of the Three Musketeers, a God-fearing man and womanizer, a former student of the Cardinal
- Kiefer Sutherland as Athos, one of the Three Musketeers and the de facto leader of the trio, a former nobleman and the first husband of Sabine de Winter
- Chris O'Donnell as D'Artagnan, a young swordsman from Gascony yearning to follow in his late father's footsteps to become a Musketeer
- Oliver Platt as Porthos, one of the Three Musketeers, an ex-thief and pirate who claims to have traveled to various places
- Tim Curry as Cardinal Richelieu, a corrupt Cardinal running the Red Guards, seeking to depose Louis XIII and rule in his stead
- Rebecca De Mornay as Milady Sabine de Winter, Athos's former wife and Lord de Winter's widow, branded with a fleur-de-lis, a seductress employed by Richelieu to ensnare the Duke of Buckingham
- Gabrielle Anwar as Queen Anne, Queen of France, wife of Louis XIII
- Michael Wincott as Captain Rochefort, an ex-Musketeer who wears an eyepatch and is the Commander of the Red Guards. The sword he carries is d'Artagnan's father's sword, as he is the man's murderer.
- Paul McGann as
  - Girard, d'Artagnan's arch nemesis who is determined to kill him and regain his sisters honor
  - Jussac, one of the Cardinal's guards
- Julie Delpy as Constance, a noblewoman and Anne's handmaiden who catches d'Artagnan's eye
- Hugh O'Conor as King Louis XIII, the young King of France
- Sebastian Eckhardt as Armand de Winter, Milady's brother-in-law who is hunting her down after she killed his brother Lord de Winter
- Christopher Adamson as Henri, one of Milady's personal bodyguards
- Phillip Tan as Parker, Milady's East Asian bodyguard
- Herbert Fux as The Innkeeper
- Bob Anderson as Louis' Fencing Instructor (uncredited)

== Production ==
In 1992, Walt Disney Pictures, Columbia Pictures and TriStar Pictures simultaneously began development on three separate adaptations of The Three Musketeers by Alexandre Dumas. Disney purchased a screenplay for the film from David Loughery for $650,000 after he had already been hired to write the screenplay of the Columbia adaptation and Columbia producer Brad Wyman accused Disney of stealing concepts which were its intellectual property. The matter was settled out of court and the Columbia adaptation was cancelled. The TriStar adaptation was set to be written by Joel Gross and directed by Jeremiah S. Chechik and was to be more adult-oriented and faithful to Alexandre Dumas' original novel than the Disney version.

Charlie Sheen was originally sought for the role of Porthos before he was cast as Aramis, while Brendan Fraser was the first choice for the role of d'Artagnan. Brad Pitt and Stephen Dorff also turned down the role of d'Artagnan, which ultimately went to Chris O'Donnell. William Baldwin, Jean-Claude Van Damme, Al Pacino, Johnny Depp, Cary Elwes, Robert Downey Jr. and Gary Oldman were also sought out by Disney for parts in the film. Winona Ryder was considered for the role of Milady de Winter but dropped out and Rebecca De Mornay was cast. Kiefer Sutherland, O'Donnell and Oliver Platt all endured six weeks of fencing and riding lessons. Sheen missed this training as he was still filming Hot Shots! Part Deux. Depp was cast in Chechik's adaptation at TriStar after Baldwin, Downey Jr. and Sutherland were also considered for roles in the film. Platt had also been approached to play Porthos in that version. However, it never entered production.

Cinergi Pictures, the film's production studio, dropped the film because its chairman Andrew G. Vajna disapproved of Disney's casting choices. Jordan Kerner and Jon Avnet were briefly involved with the film, but also quit in order to focus on When a Man Loves a Woman. Disney President David Hoberman hired Caravan Pictures under Joe Roth and Roger Birnbaum to produce the film. Roth and Birnbaum had previously bid against both Columbia and Disney for Loughery's script while working at 20th Century Fox.

Disney decided against shooting the film on location in Paris because much of the city's French Baroque architecture had been destroyed in World War II. After initially settling on Barrandov Studios in Prague, the production moved to Vienna after the local government offered $2 million. Principal photography began on April 26, 1993, with a budget of $30 million. The Three Musketeers was mostly shot in Perchtoldsdorf, Austria, where De Mornay attended high school and college.

=== Filming locations ===
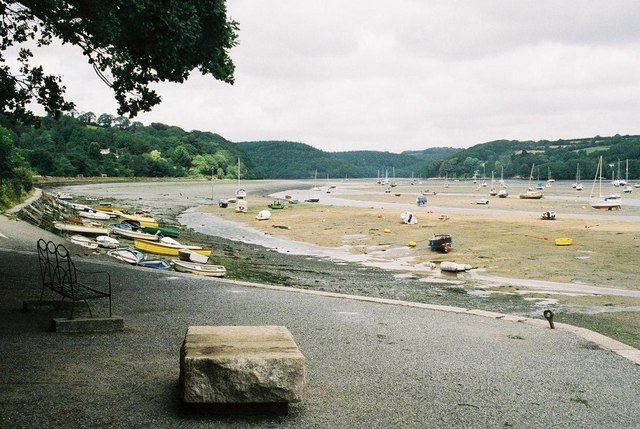
Golitha Falls, is a river in Cornwall, England during the movie.

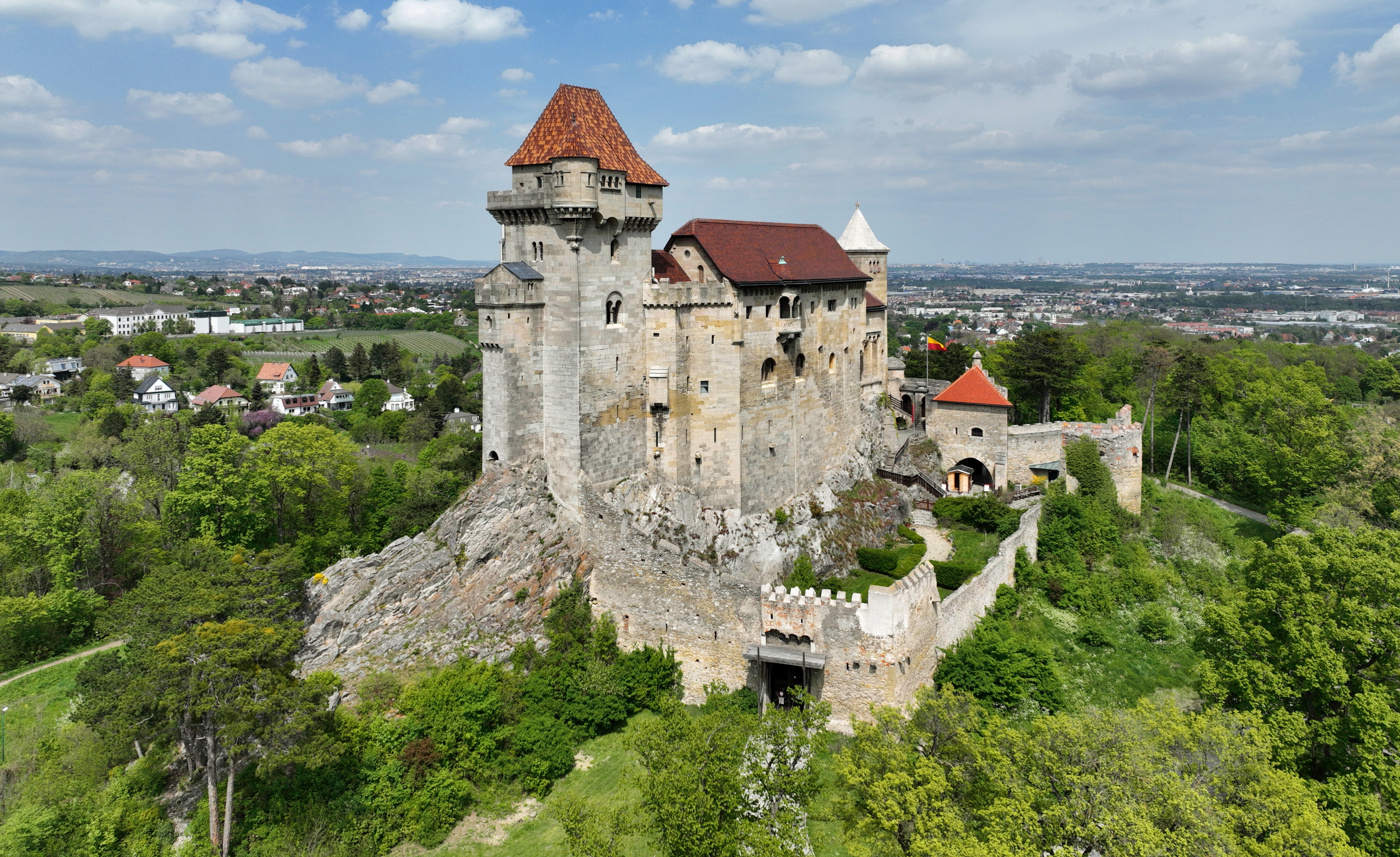
Burg Liechtenstein, is a castle located in Maria Enzersdorf, Lower Austria during the movie.

Filming locations included Charlestown, Cornwall, UK; Castle Landsee, Burg Liechtenstein, Maria Enzersdorf, Seegrotte (Hinterbrühl), Korneuburg (Lower Austria); and Vienna (particularly Hofburg) in Austria. Some sequences were shot in Cornwall, UK. A small woods called Golitha Falls was used in one sequence when the musketeers are being pursued by guards. The small harbor village of Charlestown is home to the galleon that was used in a night shoot.

== Reception ==
The Three Musketeers was highly anticipated after Disney announced that its September 1993 test screenings for the film showed the most positive response it had ever received from an audience. However, after its release, it received negative reviews from critics.

On Rotten Tomatoes, the film finds an approval rating of 33% based on 30 reviews. The site's critics consensus reads: "Its starry trio of do-gooders may promise to fight 'one for all, all for one,' but this Three Musketeers is a slickly unmemorable update bound to satisfy very few." At Metacritic, the film has a weighted average score of 43 out of 100, based on 24 critics, indicating "mixed or average reviews". Audiences polled by CinemaScore gave the film an average grade of "A−" on an A+ to F scale.

Film critic Leonard Maltin christened this version Young Swords, as it reunited Sheen and Sutherland, both of Young Guns fame. Janet Maslin of The New York Times described the movie as "Conceived frankly as a product, complete with hit-to-be theme song over the closing credits, this adventure film cares less about storytelling than about keeping the Musketeers' feathered hats on straight whenever they go galloping." Michael Wilmington of the Chicago Tribune wrote that "The new Walt Disney version of The Three Musketeers—plushly mounted, but ineptly written and cast—gallops along like a gargantuan tutti-frutti wagon running amok."

Owen Gleiberman of Entertainment Weekly wrote that the film "is livelier than its obvious models, the Young Guns films, but as crowd pleasers go it's plodding and synthetic, with little of the vitality or satirical dash that marked Richard Lester's sophisticated slapstick version (made in 1974). The director, Stephen Herek, would have been smart to take more of his cues from Platt's performance; on the few occasions when the film slips into brattish MTV knowingness, it at least has its own cheeky flavor. But neither Platt nor Sheen — the two comedians here — gets enough to do, and the movie turns into a sketchy, no-frills retread of the musketeer myth, as joyless a retro-swashbuckler as Kevin Costner's Robin Hood. Despite Tim Curry's dutiful mugging as the evil Cardinal Richelieu (by now, these 'scene-stealing' villains are every bit as predictable as the heroes they're supposed to be upstaging), the castle-intrigue stuff is bland, and the swordplay is poorly filmed, with too much chop-chop editing and too many close-ups. We get the energy of battle without the dance."

Chris O'Donnell was nominated for a Golden Raspberry Award for Worst Supporting Actor for his work in the film but lost to Woody Harrelson for Indecent Proposal at the 14th Golden Raspberry Awards.

=== Box office ===
The film grossed $11.5 million in its opening weekend, placing it at number 1 at the US box office. It went on to gross $53.9 million in the United States and Canada and $57 million internationally for a worldwide total of $111 million.

== Soundtrack ==
Professional ratings
Review scores
Source	Rating
AllMusic	3/5 stars
Select	3/5 medals

Bryan Adams co-wrote "All for Love" with Robert John "Mutt" Lange and Michael Kamen for the movie's end credits, performing it with Rod Stewart and Sting. As Janet Maslin predicted, the song was a big hit (reaching No. 1 on the Billboard Hot 100 in North America and several other territories). Kamen also composed the movie's score, conducting the Greater Los Angeles All Star Orchestra.

The soundtrack album was released on compact disc and cassette on November 12, 1993 by Hollywood Records and Columbia Records in North America and A&M Records (the label to which both Adams and Sting were signed at the time) elsewhere.

1. "All for Love" – Bryan Adams, Rod Stewart & Sting (4:45)
2. "The Cavern of Cardinal Richelieu (Overture & Passacaille)" (2:58)
3. "D'Artagnan (Galliard & Air)" (3:19)
4. "Athos, Porthos and Aramis (Courante)" (5:24)
5. "Sword Fight (Bransle)" (3:20)
6. "King Louis XIII, Queen Anne and Constance/Lady in Waiting (Gavotte)" (5:05)
7. "The Cardinal's Coach (Estampie)" (4:45)
8. "Cannonballs (Rigadoon)" (3:29)
9. "M'Lady DeWinter (Lament)" (4:16)
10. "The Fourth Musketeer (Concert Royaux)" (5:19)

== Comic book adaptation ==
- Marvel Comics: Disney's The Three Musketeers (January 1994)
