= Caravan Pictures =

American film production company

Caravan Pictures, Inc.
- Company type: Subsidiary
- Industry: Entertainment
- Founded: November 17, 1992; 33 years ago
- Founders: Roger Birnbaum; Joe Roth
- Defunct: 1999; 26 years ago
- Fate: Closed
- Successor: Spyglass Entertainment
- Headquarters: Santa Monica, California, United States
- Key people: Roger Birnbaum (chairman, CEO); Jonathan Glickman (president)
- Products: Films
- Number of employees: 7 (1997)
- Parent: The Walt Disney Studios

Caravan Pictures, Inc. was an American film production company at Walt Disney Studios, formed by Roger Birnbaum and Joe Roth that was active from November 17, 1992 to 1999. Caravan Pictures' films were distributed by Buena Vista Pictures Distribution (now known as Walt Disney Studios Motion Pictures since 2007).

While Disney would sign directors and talent to two- and three-picture deals, Caravan Pictures would work with talent based on the project being produced and not lock them into agreements. The production company's slate strategy was to commit to screenwriters as directors, put bankable actors in predictable roles, and low-budget movies with like breakthrough talent. The unit had greenlight authority up to $30 million with the expectation of producing 5 to 7 films a year and did not have salary caps. They also did not have its own full business and legal affairs departments, and executives did not have titles until 1997.

== History ==
Caravan Pictures was founded by Roger Birnbaum and Joe Roth as a production company at Disney in 1992 to fill the Disney Studios' then-yearly 50 to 60 production and distribution slots. Caravan Pictures was given a five-year, 25-picture agreement with greenlight authority up to $30 million and an overhead budget of $3 million, and was expected to produce 5 to 7 films per year originally. After just releasing its first picture, The Three Musketeers, on Christmas Day 1993, Caravan Pictures expected to release 10 films in 1994, which could accelerate the end of the deal in 2 1/2 years instead of 5 years. They were able to get the adaptation of Angie, I Says that was in turnaround at 20th Century Fox, where they have previously worked. In 1993, Jonathan Glickman, who came from the USC's Peter Stark Program, joined Caravan Pictures as an intern. In early 1994, Fox executive Riley Kathryn Ellis, of which was a close friend of Roth, joined the company.

When three out of the next four films flopped at the box office, Roth promised to cover I Love Trouble cost overruns pegged at $15 million if it did poorly. It eventually flopped as well.

Roth moved on to be Disney studio chief on August 24, 1994, leaving Birnbaum in charge. Disney CEO Michael Eisner was so set on replacing Jeffrey Katzenberg as Disney studio chief with Roth that he forgave the cost overrun debt and paid Roth $40 million of fees for 21 unproduced films under the deal.

Caravan Pictures was restructured in September 1997 to expand production in quantity and television films. Glickman was promoted to president of Caravan Pictures at that time, which led Birnbaum to start giving out titles to executives.

In August 1998, Birnbaum left Caravan Pictures to co-found Spyglass Entertainment (with Gary Barber, former vice chairman and COO of Morgan Creek Productions) at Roth's prompting, in which Disney took an equity stake and signed a five-year distribution agreement. With Disney cutting its yearly production output, Roth recommended forming a self-financing production firm similar to New Regency Productions. After Caravan Pictures' remaining three films were released, the company went inactive. The final production credited to Caravan Pictures is the 1999 Walt Disney Pictures film Inspector Gadget; on a rather ironic note, if not a brief moment of foreshadowing, the Caravan Pictures logo at the end of the film shows the man walking as usual before sprouting a propeller from his hat á la Gadget and flying away offscreen, never to be seen again. Caravan Pictures' slate of movie projects and an initial financial advance of $10 million to $20 million against future overages were also contributed by Disney.

== List of notable Caravan Pictures films ==
Title	Release date	Disney label released as	Notes	Budget	Gross (worldwide)
The Three Musketeers	November 12, 1993	Walt Disney Pictures	co-production with Avnet-Kerner Productions; first film	$30 million	$111 million
Angie	March 4, 1994	Hollywood Pictures	co-production with Morra-Brezner-Steinberg-Tenenbaum Productions	$26 million	$9.4 million
I Love Trouble	June 29, 1994	Touchstone Pictures	co-production with Nancy Meyers/Charles Shyer Productions	$45 million	$61.9 million
Angels in the Outfield	July 15, 1994	Walt Disney Pictures		$24 million	$50.2 million
A Low Down Dirty Shame	November 23, 1994	Hollywood Pictures		$10 million	$29.4 million
Houseguest	January 6, 1995	Hollywood Pictures		$10.5 million	$26.3 million
The Jerky Boys: The Movie	February 3, 1995	Touchstone Pictures		$8 million	$7.5 million
Heavyweights	February 17, 1995	Walt Disney Pictures			$17.6 million
Tall Tale	March 24, 1995	Walt Disney Pictures		$32 million	$11 million
While You Were Sleeping	April 21, 1995	Hollywood Pictures	co-production with Roger Birnbaum Productions	$17 million	$182 million
The Big Green	September 29, 1995	Walt Disney Pictures	co-production with Roger Birnbaum Productions	$12 million	$17.7 million
Dead Presidents	October 4, 1995	Hollywood Pictures	co-production with Underworld Entertainment	$10 million	$24.1 million
Powder	October 27, 1995	Hollywood Pictures	co-production with Daniel Grodnik Productions and Roger Birnbaum Productions	$9.5 million	$30.8 million
Before and After	February 23, 1996	Hollywood Pictures	co-production with Schroeder/Hoffman Productions	$35 million	$8.8 million
Celtic Pride	April 19, 1996	Hollywood Pictures	co-production with Roger Birnbaum Productions		$9.2 million
First Kid	August 30, 1996	Walt Disney Pictures	co-production with Roger Birnbaum Productions	$15 million	$26.5 million
The Rich Man's Wife	September 13, 1996	Hollywood Pictures	co-production with Roger Birnbaum Productions		$8.5 million
Metro	January 17, 1997	Touchstone Pictures	co-production with Roger Birnbaum Productions	$55 million	$74 million
Grosse Pointe Blank	April 11, 1997	Hollywood Pictures	co-production with Roger Birnbaum Productions, Roth/Arnold Productions and New Crime Entertainment	$15 million	$31 million
Gone Fishin'	May 30, 1997	Hollywood Pictures	co-production with Roger Birnbaum Productions	$53 million	$19.7 million
G.I. Jane	August 22, 1997	Hollywood Pictures	co-production with Scott Free Productions, Largo Entertainment, Roger Birnbaum Productions and Moving Pictures	$50 million	$97.1 million
RocketMan	October 10, 1997	Walt Disney Pictures	co-production with Roger Birnbaum Productions and Gold/Miller Management	$16 million	$15.4 million
Washington Square	October 17, 1997	Hollywood Pictures	co-production with Roger Birnbaum Productions and Alchemy Filmworks	$15 million	$1.8 million
Six Days, Seven Nights	June 12, 1998	Touchstone Pictures	co-production with Roger Birnbaum Productions and Northern Lights Entertainment	$70 million	$164.8 million
Simon Birch	September 11, 1998	Hollywood Pictures	co-production with Roger Birnbaum Productions and Laurence Mark Productions	$30 million	$18.2 million
Holy Man	October 9, 1998	Touchstone Pictures	co-production with Roger Birnbaum Productions	$60 million	$27 million
Inspector Gadget	July 23, 1999	Walt Disney Pictures	co-production with Avnet/Kerner Productions, Roger Birnbaum Productions and DiC Entertainment; final film	$75 million	$134.4 million
