= Houseguest =

- Promotional movie poster
- Directed by: Randall Miller
- Written by: Michael J. Di Gaetano; Lawrence Gay
- Produced by: Joe Roth; Roger Birnbaum
- Starring: Sinbad; Phil Hartman; Jeffrey Jones; Kim Greist
- Cinematography: Jerzy Zielinski
- Edited by: Eric Sears
- Music by: John Debney
- Production companies: Hollywood Pictures; Caravan Pictures
- Distributed by: Buena Vista Pictures Distribution
- Release date: January 6, 1995
- Running time: 109 minutes
- Country: United States
- Language: English
- Budget: $10,500,000
- Box office: $26,325,256

Houseguest is a 1995 American comedy film starring Sinbad and Phil Hartman and directed by Randall Miller, released to theaters in the United States on January 6, 1995 by Buena Vista Pictures Distribution to negative reviews from critics.

== Plot ==
Kevin Franklin is an inner city Pittsburgh native. Raised in an orphanage, he has delusions of grandeur, and talks about getting rich and driving a Porsche one day. Twenty-five years later, he drives a rusted MG Midget and all his ambitions revolve around a series of ill fated get-rich-quick schemes. A handshake loan of $5,000 from loan sharks grows to $50,000 through interest and penalties, resulting in him trying to skip town at Pittsburgh International Airport.

Kevin overhears a conversation between lawyer Gary Young and his three children as they are waiting to pick up his childhood friend, Derek Bond, who is now a successful, strait-laced and vegetarian dentist. Upon hearing him say that he has not seen Derek in twenty five years and does not know what he looks like, Kevin gives his baseball cap to the real Derek to throw off the two dimwitted mobsters chasing him and poses as Derek to the Youngs, who take him to their posh home in Sewickley.

Although he knows nothing about dentistry, Kevin still manages to convince those around him that he is in fact Derek Bond, and his affable personality makes him popular with Gary's otherwise stuffy and rich associates. Gary has little time for his family. His wife, Emily, runs a chain of successful new frozen yogurt businesses, which gradually builds a gap between them, largely due to the demands of his bigoted, arrogant boss at the law firm where he works, and the fact that their clients are a rival yogurt company that is Emily's competition. This leads to Kevin developing a bond with Gary's Goth daughter, Brooke, helping her stand up to her cheating boyfriend, and his young son, Jason, who has aspirations of playing pro basketball. Gary eventually stands up to his boss with Kevin's support and quits the firm to be with his family.

Meanwhile, the mobsters threaten Kevin's best friend, Larry, into revealing his whereabouts, and Kevin asks him to pick him up. After he does so reluctantly, he sparks an argument with him over his lack of appreciation of friendship, causing him to realize that Gary has been his friend all along. He returns to the Youngs' house only to find that the mobsters have taken them hostage, and his true identity is revealed when the real Derek Bond finally shows up.

After the mobsters take Kevin away, he manages to escape, losing them in a charity marathon, where he meets up with Gary, who graciously decides to help him despite his charade, in return for helping bring his family closer together. Kevin reveals that he has an instant lottery ticket he purchased the previous day for a chance at a $1 million cash prize spin on a Saturday night television show, which he reluctantly gives up to the mobsters in exchange for the forgiveness of his debt.

The film fast forwards to wintertime, Kevin parallel parks a shiny new red Porsche with Larry in tow, in front of the Youngs' house, appearing for a promotional party for his new best-seller book, Handbook for Houseguests, based on his experiences with them. The partygoers gather in front of the television to watch the mobsters spin the wheel for the jackpot.

It initially lands on the million dollar jackpot, but then falls and lands on $5,000, much to the mafia don's dismay and Kevin's delight. During the closing credits, Gary and Kevin sing a medley of food based parodies of Christmas songs, as they cook a barbecue in the Youngs' backyard outside of a Christmas party.

== Cast ==
- Sinbad as Kevin Franklin
- Phil Hartman as Gary Young
- Jeffrey Jones as Ron Timmerman
- Kim Greist as Emily Young, Gary's wife
- Stan Shaw as Larry, the Tattoo Artist
- Tony Longo as Joey Gasperini, Pauly's younger brother
- Paul Ben-Victor as Pauly Gasperini, Joey's older brother
- Mason Adams as Mr. Pike
- Chauncey Leopardi as Jason Young, Gary & Emily's son
- Talia Seider as Sarah Young, Gary & Emily's younger daughter
- Kim Murphy as Brooke Young, Gary & Emily's older daughter
- Ron Glass as Dr. Derek Bond
- Kevin West as Vincent Montgomery
- Kevin Jordan as Steve 'ST-3', Brooke's boyfriend
- Patricia Fraser as Nancy Pike
- Don Brockett as Happy Marcelli
- Kirk Baily as Stuart the Manager

== Production ==
In February 1993, Sinbad signed a deal with The Walt Disney Company for a 13 episode television show and a pay or play deal for the film. Phil Hartman joined it in March 1994.

Some scenes for the film were shot and it was filmed between May 9 and June 30, 1994 on location at the Pittsburgh International Airport, Pittsburgh's historic Hill District and South Side, Downtown Pittsburgh, and the Sewickley suburb. Since Sewickley does not have a McDonald's, production built a complete functional one at the Bruegger's Bagels location which remained open for business during the shoot before being closed and dismantled. Randall Miller confirmed in a 2023 interview that the production received no subsidies from McDonald's and that the heavy incorporation into the narrative was simply part of a recurring joke.

== Reception ==
=== Box office ===
The film debuted at no. 3. It eventually grossed $26 million in North America. When compared to its $10.5 million budget, it was a modest commercial success.

=== Critical response ===
The film received negative reviews. Rotten Tomatoes gives the film a score of 17% based on 23 reviews, with an average rating of 3.80/10. The site's consensus reads, "Perplexingly unfunny given the involvement of its two hilarious leads, Houseguest wears out its welcome almost immediately". Caryn James of The New York Times describes the film as "an inane fish out of water comedy" and says "That Sinbad survives with his dignity and comic reputation intact is amazing" but notes that Phil Hartman is not so lucky.
