= Shanghai (film series) =

Action comedy franchise

- Blu-ray box set for the duology
- Directed by: Tom Dey (1); David Dobkin (2); Jared Hess (3)
- Screenplay by: Alfred Gough; Miles Millar; Aaron Buchsbaum (3); Theodore Riley (3)
- Based on: Characters by Alfred Gough; Miles Millar
- Produced by: Roger Birnbaum; Gary Barber; Jonathan Glickman
- Starring: Jackie Chan; Owen Wilson (See below)
- Cinematography: Dan Mindel (1); Adrian Biddle (2)
- Edited by: Richard Chew (1); Malcolm Campbell (2)
- Music by: Randy Edelman
- Production companies: Touchstone Pictures; Spyglass Entertainment
- Distributed by: Buena Vista Pictures
- Release dates: May 6, 2000 (1); February 7, 2003 (2)
- Country: United States
- Language: English
- Budget: $105 million
- Box office: $188 million

Shanghai is a series of martial arts action comedy films based on the characters written by Alfred Gough and Miles Millar. The series includes: Shanghai Noon (2000), Shanghai Knights (2003), and the upcoming Shanghai Dawn (TBA). It stars Jackie Chan and Owen Wilson as the Chinese Imperial guard Chon Wang and the American bandit Roy O'Bannon. The series grossed a combined $188 million.

== Films ==
=== Shanghai Dawn (TBA) ===
On May 14, 2015, MGM announced that they are moving forward with Shanghai Dawn. Jackie Chan, Owen Wilson and Fann Wong are expected to reprise their roles as Chon Wang, Roy O'Bannon and Chon Lin respectively. In September 2016, Jared Hess signed on as director for the film while both Millar and Gough will develop a screen story with Theodore Riley and Aaron Buchsbaum writing the script for the film. As of 2026, there is no information about either the film's progress or its release date.

== Principal cast ==
Character	Film	
Character	Shanghai Noon	Shanghai Knights
Character	2000	2003
Chon Wang	Jackie Chan	Jackie Chan
Roy O'Bannon	Owen Wilson	Owen Wilson
Princess Pei-Pei	Lucy Liu	Mentioned only
Falling Leaves	Brandon Merrill	Mentioned only
Lo Fong	Roger Yuan	
Wallace	Walton Goggins	
Marshal Nathan Van Cleef	Xander Berkeley	
Calvin Andrews	Jason Connery	
Vasquez	Rafael Baez	
Blue	P. Adrien Dorval	
Chon Lin		Fann Wong
Lord Nelson Rathbone		Aidan Gillen
Wu Chow		Donnie Yen
Inspector Arthur "Artie" Doyle		Tom Fisher
Chon Father		Kim Chan
Queen Victoria		Gemma Jones
Charlie Chaplin		Aaron Taylor-Johnson

== Crew ==
Year	Film	Director	Producer	Screenwriter	Composer	Editor	Cinematographer
2000	Shanghai Noon	Tom Dey	Gary Barber, Roger Birnbaum & Jonathan Glickman	Miles Millar & Alfred Gough	Randy Edelman	Richard Chew	Dan Mindel
2003	Shanghai Knights	David Dobkin	Gary Barber, Roger Birnbaum & Jonathan Glickman	Miles Millar & Alfred Gough	Randy Edelman	Malcolm Campbell	Adrian Biddle
TBA	Shanghai Dawn	Jared Hess	TBA	Theodore Riley & Aaron Buchsbaum	TBA	TBA	TBA

== Reception ==
=== Box office performance ===
Film	Release date	Box office gross				Box office ranking		Budget	Ref(s)
Film	Release date	Opening weekend (North America)	North America	Other territories	Worldwide	All time North America	All time worldwide	Budget	Ref(s)
Shanghai Noon	May 26, 2000	$15,607,034	$56,937,502	$42,336,965	$99,274,467	#1333	#485	$55,000,000	
Shanghai Knights	February 7, 2003	$19,603,630	$60,476,872	$27,846,615	$88,323,487	#1233	#545	$50,000,000	
Total			$117,414,374	$70,183,580	$187,597,954			$105,000,000	

=== Critical and public response ===
Film	Rotten Tomatoes	Metacritic	CinemaScore
Shanghai Noon	80% (134 reviews)	77 (30 reviews)	A−
Shanghai Knights	66% (150 reviews)	58 (33 reviews)	B+
