= List of awards and nominations received by Owen Wilson =

Owen Wilson awards and nominations
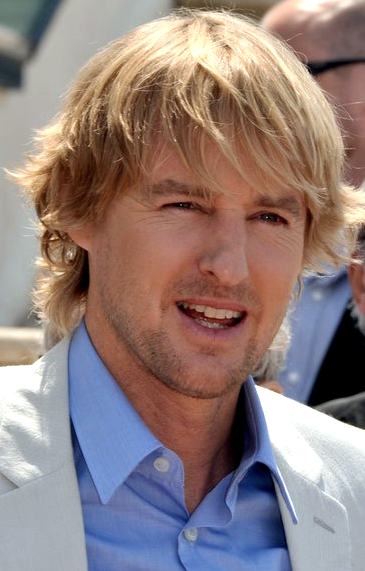
- Wilson in 2011
Awards and nominations
Award	Wins	Nominations
Golden Globe	0	1
Academy Awards	0	1
BAFTA Awards	0	1
Screen Actors Guild Awards	0	2

Owen Wilson is an actor, comedian, screenwriter, and producer.

Wilson is known for his career as an onscreen comedian and member of the Frat Pack, having starred in such comedies as Zoolander (2001), Starsky & Hutch (2004), Wedding Crashers (2005), and You, Me and Dupree (2006). He is also known for the family films Marley and Me (2008), and the Night at the Museum film series (2005–2014). Among his notable voice acting credits are Lightning McQueen in the Cars film series (2006–present), Coach Skip in Fantastic Mr. Fox (2009) and Reggie in Free Birds (2013). Wilson starred as Mobius M. Mobius in the Disney+ limited series Loki (2021–2023).

Wilson has collaborated on multiple occasions with independent filmmaker Wes Anderson, the two jointly having been nominated for an Academy Award and British Academy Film Award for their screenplay The Royal Tenenbaums (2001). In 2011, he was nominated for the Golden Globe Award for Best Actor – Motion Picture Musical or Comedy for his performance in the Woody Allen time traveling romantic comedy Midnight in Paris (2011). He also received two Screen Actors Guild Award nominations for Outstanding Ensemble Cast in a Motion Picture for Allen's Midnight in Paris (2011), and Anderson's The Grand Budapest Hotel (2014). In 2014, he received the Independent Spirit Robert Altman Award along with the cast of Paul Thomas Anderson's Inherent Vice (2014).

== Major associations ==
=== Academy Awards ===
Year	Category	Nominated work	Result	Ref.
2002	Best Original Screenplay	The Royal Tenenbaums	Nominated (Note: Shared with Wes Anderson)	

=== British Academy Film Awards ===
Year	Category	Nominated work	Result	Ref.
2002	Best Original Screenplay	The Royal Tenenbaums	Nominated	

=== Golden Globe Award ===
Year	Category	Nominated work	Result	Ref.
2012	Best Actor in a Motion Picture - Comedy or Musical	Midnight in Paris	Nominated	

=== Screen Actors Guild Award ===
Year	Category	Nominated work	Result	Ref.
2012	Outstanding Ensemble Cast in a Motion Picture	Midnight in Paris	Nominated (Note: Shared with the cast)	
2015	Outstanding Ensemble Cast in a Motion Picture	The Grand Budapest Hotel	Nominated	

=== Independent Spirit Awards ===
Year	Category	Nominated work	Result	Ref.
2015	Robert Altman Award	Inherent Vice	Won	

=== Writers Guild of America Awards ===
Year	Category	Nominated work	Result	Ref.
2002	Best Original Screenplay	The Royal Tenenbaums	Nominated	

== Critics awards ==
Year	Title	Association	Category	Results
1998	New York Film Critics Circle Award	Best Screenplay	Rushmore	Nominated
1998	National Society of Film Critics Award	Best Screenplay	Rushmore	Nominated
2001	New York Film Critics Circle Award	Best Screenplay	The Royal Tenenbaums	Nominated
2001	Toronto Film Critics Association Award	Best Screenplay	The Royal Tenenbaums	Nominated
2002	Chicago Film Critics Association Award	Best Screenplay	The Royal Tenenbaums	Nominated
2002	Las Vegas Film Critics Society Award	Best Screenplay	The Royal Tenenbaums	Nominated
2002	Online Film Critics Society Award	Best Screenplay	The Royal Tenenbaums	Nominated
2002	Phoenix Film Critics Society Award	Best Screenplay - Original	The Royal Tenenbaums	Nominated
2002	Phoenix Film Critics Society Award	Best Acting Ensemble	The Royal Tenenbaums	Nominated
2004	Boston Society of Film Critics Award	Best Ensemble Cast	The Life Aquatic with Steve Zissou	Nominated
2005	Critics Choice Movie Award	Best Acting Ensemble	The Life Aquatic with Steve Zissou	Nominated
2011	Phoenix Film Critics Society Award	Best Acting Ensemble	Midnight in Paris	Nominated
2014	Detroit Film Critics Society Award	Best Ensemble	The Grand Budapest Hotel	Won
2014	Florida Film Critics Circle Award	Best Ensemble	The Grand Budapest Hotel	Won
2014	Phoenix Film Critics Society Award	Best Acting Ensemble	The Grand Budapest Hotel	Nominated
2014	San Diego Film Critics Society Award	Best Ensemble	The Grand Budapest Hotel	Nominated
2014	Southeastern Film Critics Association Award	Best Ensemble	The Grand Budapest Hotel	Won
2014	Washing DC Area Film Critics Association Award	Best Acting Ensemble	The Grand Budapest Hotel	Nominated
2015	Central Ohio Film Critics Association Award	Best Ensemble	The Grand Budapest Hotel	Won
2015	Georgia Film Critics Association Award	Best Ensemble	The Grand Budapest Hotel	Won

== Miscellaneous awards ==
Year	Title	Association	Category	Results
1996	Lone Star Film & Television Award	Debut of the Year (Note: Shared with Wes Anderson & Luke Wilson.)	Bottle Rocket	Won
1999	Lone Star Film & Television Award	Best Screenplay	Rushmore	Won
2000	Blockbuster Entertainment Award	Favorite Supporting Actor - Horror	The Haunting	Nominated
2000	Chlotrudis Award	Best Screenplay (Note: Shared with Wes Anderson.)	Rushmore	Nominated
2001	Awards Circuit Community Award	Best Cast Ensemble	The Royal Tenenbaums	Nominated
2001	Blockbuster Entertainment Award	Favorite Supporting Actor - Comedy	Meet the Parents	Nominated
2001	Blockbuster Entertainment Award	Favorite Action Team - Internet Only (Note: Shared with Jackie Chan.)	Shanghai Noon	Nominated
2001	Satellite Award	Best Supporting Actor in a Motion Picture - Comedy or Musical	Shanghai Noon	Nominated
2001	The Stinkers Bad Movie Award	Worst On-Screen Hairstyle	Zoolander	Nominated
2002	MTV Movie + TV Award	Best On-Screen Team	Zoolander	Nominated
2002	Online Film & Television Association Award	Best Original Screenplay	The Royal Tenenbaums	Nominated
2002	Satellite Award	Best Supporting Actor in a Motion Picture - Comedy or Musical	The Royal Tenenbaums	Nominated
2003	Golden Raspberry Award	Worst Screen Couple (Note: Shared with Eddie Murphy.)	I Spy	Nominated
2003	MTV Movie + TV Award	Best On-Screen Team	Shanghai Knights	Nominated
2004	MTV Movie + TV Award	Best On-Screen Team (Note: Shared with Ben Stiller.)	Starsky & Hutch	Nominated
2004	MTV Movie + TV Award	Best Kiss (Note: Shared with Carmen Electra & Amy Smart.)	Starsky & Hutch	Won
2004	Teen Choice Award	Choice Movie Actor - Comedy	Starsky & Hutch	Nominated
2004	Teen Choice Award	Choice Movie - Chemistry	Starsky & Hutch	Nominated
2005	Oldenburg Film Festival Award	German Independence Honorary Award	—N/a	Won
2005	People's Choice Award	Favorite On-Screen Chemistry	Starsky & Hutch	Nominated
2006	MTV Movie + TV Award	Best Comedic Performance	Wedding Crashers	Nominated
2006	MTV Movie + TV Award	Best On-Screen Team (Note: Shared with Vince Vaughn.)	Wedding Crashers	Won
2006	People's Choice Award	Favorite On-Screen Match-Up	Wedding Crashers	Won
2006	Teen Choice Award	Choice Movie - Liplock (Note: Shared with Rachel McAdams.)	Wedding Crashers	Nominated
2009	Teen Choice Award	Choice Movie - Liplock (Note: Shared with Clyde the dog.)	Marley & Me	Nominated
2011	Dubai International Film Festival Award	International Star of the Year	—N/a	Won
2011	Gold Derby Award	Ensemble Cast	Midnight in Paris	Nominated
2011	People's Choice Award	Favorite Animated Voice	Cars 2	Nominated
2013	CinemaCon Award	Comedy Duo of the Year	The Internship	Won
2015	Gold Derby Award	Ensemble Cast	Inherent Vice	Nominated
2017	Golden Raspberry Award	Worst Supporting Actor	Zoolander 2	Nominated
2017	Golden Raspberry Award	Worst Screen Combo	Zoolander 2	Nominated
2017	Nickelodeon Kid's Choice Award	BFFs (Best Friends Forever)	Zoolander 2	Nominated
2017	Teen Choice Award	Choice Movie Actor - Comedy	Cars 3	Nominated
2017	Teen Choice Award	Choice Summer Movie Star - Male	Cars 3	Nominated
2022	MTV Movie & TV Awards	Best Team (Note: Shared with Tom Hiddleston and Sophia Di Martino.)	Loki	Won
2022	Hollywood Critics Association TV Awards	Best Supporting Actor in a Streaming Series, Drama	Loki	Nominated
2024	Astra TV Awards	Best Supporting Actor in a Streaming Drama Series	Loki	Nominated
