= Randy Edelman =

American musician, producer, and composer (born 1947)

- Born: June 10, 1947 (age 79); Paterson, New Jersey, U.S.
- Genres: Pop, film score
- Occupations: Composer, conductor
- Instrument: Piano
- Years active: 1972–present
- Spouse(s): Jackie DeShannon (m. 1976); 1 child

Randy Edelman (born June 10, 1947) is an American musician, producer, and composer and conductor for film and television. He began his career as a member of Broadway's pit orchestras; he later produced solo albums for songs that were picked up by leading music performers including The Carpenters, Barry Manilow, and Dionne Warwick. He is known for his work in comedy films. He has been awarded many prestigious awards along with two nominations for a Golden Globe Award, a BAFTA Award, and twelve BMI Awards. Edelman was given an honorary doctorate in fine arts by the University of Cincinnati in 2004.

Some of Edelman's best known films scores include The Chipmunk Adventure, Twins, Ghostbusters II, Kindergarten Cop, My Cousin Vinny, Beethoven, The Distinguished Gentleman, Gettysburg, Angels in the Outfield, The Mask, Pontiac Moon, The Indian in the Cupboard, The Quest, Dragonheart, Daylight, and XXX. He also wrote the theme of the popular television series MacGyver. Many of his musical pieces have been reused in television advertising, trailers, Disney movies, and award shows.

== Life and career ==
Edelman was born on 10 June 1947 in Paterson, New Jersey, to a Jewish family. He was raised in Teaneck, New Jersey, the son of a first-grade teacher and an accountant, and graduated from Teaneck High School in 1965. He attended the Cincinnati Conservatory of Music before heading to New York where he played piano in Broadway pit orchestras. He produced several solo albums of songs, some of which were later recorded by The Carpenters ("I Can't Make Music", "Piano Picker" and "You"), Barry Manilow ("Weekend in New England"), "If Love Is Real" from Olivia Newton-John's Making a Good Thing Better, Dionne Warwick ("The Laughter and the Tears"), Blood, Sweat & Tears ("Blue Street") and many others before moving to Los Angeles. Edelman started to work there in television and film scoring, while producing his solo albums which found a cult following in the United Kingdom, Europe, and Japan.

=== Musical scores ===
One of his first film scores was for the 1973 film Executive Action, which put forward a conspiracy theory concerning the assassination of John Fitzgerald Kennedy in 1963. In 1977 Edelman contributed the orchestral piece 'Grey' to the multi-composer suite Colours, put together and conducted by Vic Lewis. In the mid-1980s, Edelman wrote the theme to and scored many episodes of MacGyver, a popular television series starring Richard Dean Anderson.

During the 1980s and early 1990s, he also collaborated with Ivan Reitman, producing scores for several of his comedies, including Drop Dead Fred, Ghostbusters II, Pontiac Moon, Twins, and Kindergarten Cop. He also contributed to Beethoven; The Last of the Mohicans; The Chipmunk Adventure; The Distinguished Gentleman; The Mask; The Quest; Daylight; Anaconda; XXX; Gettysburg; My Cousin Vinny; While You Were Sleeping; Dragonheart; Shanghai Noon; Six Days, Seven Nights; The Indian in the Cupboard; Billy Madison; Angels in the Outfield; and EDtv to name a few.

Edelman was honored with the Richard Kirk Award at the 2003 BMI Film and TV Awards. The award is given annually to a composer who has made significant contributions to film and television music. In 2004, he received an honorary doctorate in fine arts from the University of Cincinnati. He and three other honorees distinguished in other fields, including Coretta Scott King were given the degree.

He produced the scores for the 2008 film The Mummy: Tomb of the Dragon Emperor. This score was recorded at Abbey Road Studios in London, where in 2010 Edelman also recorded and composed the Irish flavored music score for Amy Adams's film Leap Year. He was awarded the Goldspirit Award (named in honor of Jerry Goldsmith) for best comedy score of 2011 for the Leap Year soundtrack CD on Varèse Sarabande.

=== Scores reused elsewhere ===
While some of the films scored by Edelman were not commercial successes, the music was often reused elsewhere. Themes he wrote for Kindergarten Cop (in particular Rain Ride), Dragonheart, Dragon: The Bruce Lee Story (including the film's love theme Bruce and Linda), Gettysburg, and other films have been widely used in television advertising, film trailers, Disney movies including Mulan, and during the Academy Awards. Themes from his score for Come See the Paradise have been used in film trailers more than cues from any other film soundtrack.

=== NBC Sports ===
His music from The Adventures of Brisco County, Jr. is featured during NBC's Olympic Games coverage when upcoming events are being announced. In addition it was used during NBC's coverage of the 1997 World Series. At the end of the 1996 Summer Olympics, NBC used the closing music of Gettysburg. In the 1990s, Edelman composed the popular theme music for NBC's NFL telecasts which was used for the 1995–97 seasons through Super Bowl XXXII.

=== Personal life ===
Edelman has been married to singer Jackie DeShannon since June 3, 1976. DeShannon is known for 1960s hits including "When You Walk in the Room", "Put a Little Love in Your Heart," and "What the World Needs Now Is Love". DeShannon had a brief first marriage that was annulled after a few months. She and Edelman have a son, Noah.

== Musical discography (as artist and songwriter) ==
=== Solo albums ===
- Randy Edelman – MGM Records, 1972 (LP)
- The Laughter and the Tears – MGM Records, 1972 (LP)
- Outside In - MGM Records, 1972 (LP)
- Prime Cuts – 20th Century Records, 1974 (LP and CD) (No. 95 AUS)
- Farewell Fairbanks – 20th Century Records, 1975 (LP and CD) (No. 54 AUS)
- If Love Is Real – Arista Records, 1977 (LP and CD)
- You're the One – Arista Records, 1979 (LP and CD)
- 'Up-Town Up-Tempo: The Best of Randy Edelman – 20th Century Records, 1979 (LP)
- On Time – Rocket Records, 1982 (LP)
- Randy Edelman and His Piano – PRT Records, 1984 (LP and CD)
- Switch of the Seasons – PRT Records (Polar), 1985 (LP)
- Up-Town Up-Tempo Woman (compilation album) – Warwick Reflection Records, 1987 (CD)
- And His Piano ... The Very Best of Randy Edelman – Revola/Cherry Red Records, 2003 (CD)
- The Pacific Flow to Abbey Road – Cherry Red (UK) / Varèse Sarabande (US), 2011 (CD)

=== Charted solo singles ===
- "Everybody Wants to Find a Bluebird" (March 1975) – US No. 92, US AC No. 18
- "Concrete and Clay" (March 1976) – US AC No. 11, AUS No. 79, UK No. 11 (cover of the Unit 4 + 2 hit song)
- "Uptown Uptempo Woman" (September 1976) – UK No. 25
- "You" (January 1977) – UK No. 49
- "Can't It All Be Love" (November 1977) – CAN (RPM) No. 99
- "Nobody Made Me" (July 1982) – UK No. 60

=== Artists who have covered Edelman's songs (both music and lyrics) ===
(this is a partial list)

- Barry Manilow – "Weekend in New England" (No. 10, US)
- The Carpenters – "I Can't Make Music", "You", "Piano Picker"
- Labelle – "Isn't it a Shame"
- Olivia Newton-John – "If Love Is Real"
- Nelly – "My Place"
- Dionne Warwick – "You Are the Sunlight, I Am the Moon", "The Laughter and the Tears", "Give a Little Laughter"
- Blood Sweat and Tears – "Blue Street"
- Jackie DeShannon – "Sunny Days", "Let the Sailors Dance"
- Agnetha Fältskog – "Turn the World Around"
- The Fifth Dimension – "Everybody Wants to Call You Sweetheart"
- Kool and the Gang – "Amore Amore"
- Bing Crosby – "The Woman on Your Arm"
- Shirley Bassey – "Isn't It a Shame"
- Nancy Wilson – "The Laughter and the Tears"
- Rosemary Clooney – "You"
- Petula Clark – "Make a Time for Lovin'"

== Filmography ==
=== Film ===
Year	Title	Director	Studio(s)	Notes
1972	Outside In	Allen Baron; G. D. Spradin		
1973	Snatched	Sutton Roley	ABC Circle Films	Television film
1973	Executive Action	David Miller	National General Pictures	
1973	Blood Sport	Jerrold Freedman	Danny Thomas Productions	Television movie
1983	When Your Lover Leaves	Jeff Bleckner	Fair Dinkum, Inc. Major H Productions; NBC Productions	Television film
1984	A Doctor's Story	Peter Levin	Embassy Television	Television film
1985	Scandal Sheet	David Lowell Rich	ABC	Television film
1985	Molly and the Skywalkerz: Happily Ever After	Bill Melendez		Television film
1987	The Chipmunk Adventure	Janice Karman	Bagdasarian Productions; The Samuel Goldwyn Company	
1987	Dennis the Menace: Dinosaur Hunter	Doug Rogers		Television film
1988	Feds	Daniel Goldberg	Warner Bros.	
1988	Twins	Ivan Reitman	Universal Pictures	with Georges Delerue
1989	Troop Beverly Hills	Jeff Kanew	Weintraub Entertainment Group; Columbia Pictures	
1989	Ghostbusters II	Ivan Reitman	Columbia Pictures	
1990	Quick Change	Howard Franklin; Bill Murray	Warner Bros.	
1990	Come See the Paradise	Alan Parker	20th Century Fox	
1990	Kindergarten Cop	Ivan Reitman	Imagine Entertainment; Universal Pictures	
1991	Drop Dead Fred	Ate de Jong	Working Title Films; New Line Cinema (US); PolyGram Filmed Entertainment (International; original release); Universal Pictures (International; current rights)	
1991	V.I. Warshawski	Jeff Kanew	Hollywood Pictures	
1991	Eyes of an Angel	Robert Harmon	LIVE Entertainment	
1991	Shout	Jeffrey Hornaday	Universal Pictures	
1992	My Cousin Vinny	Jonathan Lynn	20th Century Fox	
1992	Taking Back My Life: The Nancy Ziegenmeyer Story	Harry Winer		Television film
1992	Beethoven	Brian Levant	Universal Pictures	
1992	The Last of the Mohicans	Michael Mann	Morgan Creek Productions; 20th Century Fox (US & Canada); Warner Bros. (International)	with Trevor Jones
1992	The Distinguished Gentleman	Jonathan Lynn	Hollywood Pictures	
1993	Dragon: The Bruce Lee Story	Rob Cohen	Universal Pictures	
1993	Gettysburg	Ronald F. Maxwell	Turner Pictures; New Line Cinema	
1993	Beethoven's 2nd	Rod Daniel	Northern Lights Entertainment; Universal Pictures	
1994	Greedy	Jonathan Lynn	Imagine Entertainment; Universal Pictures	
1994	Angels in the Outfield	William Dear	Caravan Pictures; Walt Disney Pictures	
1994	The Mask	Chuck Russell	Dark Horse Entertainment; New Line Cinema	
1994	Pontiac Moon	Peter Medak	Paramount Pictures	
1995	Billy Madison	Tamra Davis	Universal Pictures	
1995	Citizen X	Chris Gerolmo	HBO	Television film
1995	Tall Tale	Jeremiah S. Chechik	Caravan Pictures; Walt Disney Pictures	
1995	While You Were Sleeping	Jon Turteltaub	Caravan Pictures; Hollywood Pictures	
1995	The Indian in the Cupboard	Frank Oz	The Kennedy/Marshall Company; Scholastic; Paramount Pictures (US theatrical; International video release); Columbia Pictures (US video release; International theatrical)	
1995	The Big Green	Holly Goldberg Sloan	Caravan Pictures; Walt Disney Pictures	
1996	Down Periscope	David S. Ward	20th Century Fox	
1996	Diabolique	Jeremiah S. Chechik	Morgan Creek Productions; Warner Bros.	
1996	The Quest	Jean-Claude Van Damme	Universal Pictures	
1996	Dragonheart	Rob Cohen	Universal Pictures	
1996	Daylight	Rob Cohen	Davis Entertainment; Universal Pictures	
1997	Anaconda	Luis Llosa	Columbia Pictures	
1997	Gone Fishin'	Christopher Cain	Caravan Pictures; Hollywood Pictures	
1997	Leave It to Beaver	Andy Cadiff	Universal Pictures	
1997	For Richer or Poorer	Bryan Spicer	The Bubble Factory; Universal Pictures	
1998	Six Days, Seven Nights	Ivan Reitman	Northern Lights Entertainment; Caravan Pictures; Touchstone Pictures	
1999	EDtv	Ron Howard	Imagine Entertainment; Universal Pictures	
1999	The Hunley	John Gray	Turner Television Network	Television film
2000	Passion of Mind	Alan Berliner	Paramount Classics	
2000	The Whole Nine Yards	Jonathan Lynn	Morgan Creek Productions; Franchise Pictures; Warner Bros.	
2000	The Skulls	Rob Cohen	Original Film; Universal Pictures	
2000	Shanghai Noon	Tom Dey	Spyglass Entertainment; Touchstone Pictures	
2001	Head over Heels	Mark Waters	Universal Pictures	
2001	China: The Panda Adventure	Robert M. Young	Trane Pictures	
2001	Osmosis Jones	Farrelly brothers Tom Sito; Piet Kroon	Warner Bros. Feature Animation; Warner Bros.	
2001	Who Is Cletis Tout?	Chris Ver Wiel	Fireworks Entertainment; Seven Arts Productions; Paramount Classics	
2001	Corky Romano	Rob Pritts	Touchstone Pictures	
2001	Black Knight	Gil Junger	The Firm, Inc. Regency Enterprises; 20th Century Fox	
2002	A Season on the Brink	Robert Mandel	ESPN Films	
2002	Frank McKlusky, C.I.	Arlene Sanford	Touchstone Pictures	
2002	XXX	Rob Cohen	Revolution Studios; Original Film; Columbia Pictures	
2003	National Security	Dennis Dugan	Columbia Pictures	
2003	Shanghai Knights	David Dobkin	Spyglass Entertainment; Touchstone Pictures	
2003	Gods and Generals	Ronald F. Maxwell	Ted Turner Pictures; Warner Bros.	with John Frizzell
2004	Connie and Carla	Michael Lembeck	Spyglass Entertainment; Universal Pictures	
2004	Surviving Christmas	Mike Mitchell	DreamWorks Pictures	
2005	Son of the Mask	Lawrence Guterman	Dark Horse Entertainment; New Line Cinema	
2006	The Last Time	Michael Caleo	No distributor	
2007	Underdog	Frederik Du Chau	Spyglass Entertainment; Walt Disney Pictures	
2007	Balls of Fury	Robert Ben Garant	Spyglass Entertainment; Rogue Pictures	
2008	27 Dresses	Anne Fletcher	Dune Entertainment; Spyglass Entertainment; 20th Century Fox	
2008	The Mummy: Tomb of the Dragon Emperor	Rob Cohen	Relativity Media; Universal Pictures	
2010	Leap Year	Anand Tucker	Spyglass Entertainment; Universal Pictures	
2011	The Greening of Whitney Brown	Peter Skillman Odiorne	ARC Entertainment	
2015	The Boy Next Door	Rob Cohen	Blumhouse Productions; Nuyorican Productions; Universal Pictures	With Nathan Barr Additional Music By Lisbeth Scott
2015	Leaves of the Tree	Ante Novakovic		
2016	Back in the Day	Paul Borghese	Tappan Films	
2017	Max 2: White House Hero	Brian Levant	Warner Bros.	
2019	Backdraft 2	Gonzalo López-Gallego	Universal 1440 Entertainment	Video
2019	Love in Kilnery	Daniel Keith	Archway Pictures	
2021	Skelly	Matt Greene-Delanghe	Walk Like a Duck Entertainment	
2023	A Look in the Rear View	Gregg Harris	That Don't Fly	
2024	Heart Strings	Ate de Jong	Mulholland Films	
2024	The Beast Inside	Jim Towns	Uncorked Ent.	
2025	Dog Patrol	Josh Webber	Webber Films	
2027	Cassi	Josh Webber	GVN Distribution	
TBA	Naya...Legend of the Golden Dolphin 3D	Jonathon Kay	Magic Factory Prod.	

=== Television ===
Year	Title	Notes
1983	Ryan's Four	6 episodes
1984	CBS Schoolbreak Special	episode: All the Kids Do It
1985–87	MacGyver	seasons 1–2
1986	Mr. Sunshine	episode: Pilot
1988	ABC Afterschool Special	episode: A Family Again
1993	The Adventures of Brisco County, Jr.	episode: Pilot
2006	The Ten Commandments	miniseries

== Awards, milestones and announcements ==
Platinum and gold Records

Barry Manilow Greatest Hits, Live,

This One's for You

- The Carpenters: "A Song for You", Now And Then, and A Kind of Hush
- Olivia Newton-John: Making A Good Thing Better
- Nelly: Suit
- Now 17: "My Place"
- Last of the Mohicans (soundtrack)

Saturn Awards

- "Dragonheart" nominated by Academy of Science Fiction, Fantasy & Horror Films (Saturn Award for Best Music)

International Film Music Critics Association Nomination

- "Ten Commandments": Nominated by the IFMCA (International Film Music Critics Association) for

Best Original Score for Television for ABC's mini-series

Honorary Doctorate of Fine Arts

- University of Cincinnati: Recipient of Honorary Doctorate of Fine Arts

Broadcast Music, Inc. (BMI)

- Recipient of BMI's highest honor, the Richard Kirk Lifetime Achievement Award
- Top Grossing Film Award: 27 Dresses
- Top Grossing Film Award: The Mask
- Top Grossing Film Award: The Mummy: Tomb of the Dragon Emperor
- Top Grossing Film Award: The Last of the Mohicans
- Top Grossing Film Award: XXX
- Top Grossing Film Award: Kindergarten Cop
- Top Grossing Film Award: Six Days Seven Nights
- Top Grossing Film Award: Ghostbusters II
- Top Grossing Film Award: Anaconda
- Top Grossing Film Award: Twins
- Top Grossing Film Award: While You Were Sleeping
- Top TV Series Award: MacGyver
- Spotlight Award: Awarded for two decades of NBC's Randy Edelman Olympic Theme

Emmy Awards

- Winner: "Atlanta Olympics NBC Broadcast" Emmy Award

Golden Globes Award

- Nominated: Last of the Mohicans ( Best Original Score - Motion Picture)

British Academy of Film and Television Awards Nomination

- Last of the Mohicans: Nominated (Best Original Film Score) BAFTA Award for Best Film Music

Kautz Alumni Masters Awards

- University of Cincinnati: Kautz Alumni Masters Award for Outstanding Alumnus

Goldspirit Awards

- Leap Year (film): Named in honor of Jerry Goldsmith as Best Comedy Score

Long Island International Film Expo

- Lifetime Achievement Award: In Film Scoring and Composition
- 2018 Composer and Lyricist Guild
- Lifetime Achievement Award L.A.

=== LA Film Awards ===
- Love in Kilnery: Best Score, 2019

=== New England Music Hall of Fame ===
- Lifetime Achievement Award, 2023

=== New York Get Out Magazine ===
- Lifetime Achievement Award, 2023

=== NYR Metropolitan Club ===
- Career Bridge Lifetime Achievement Award, 2024

=== Grand Ole Opry, Nashville ===
- Josie Songwriter Legend Award, 2024

=== Broadway World Magazine ===
- Best Producer for album Waltzing on a High Wire, 2025
