= Richard Chew =

American film editor (born 1940)

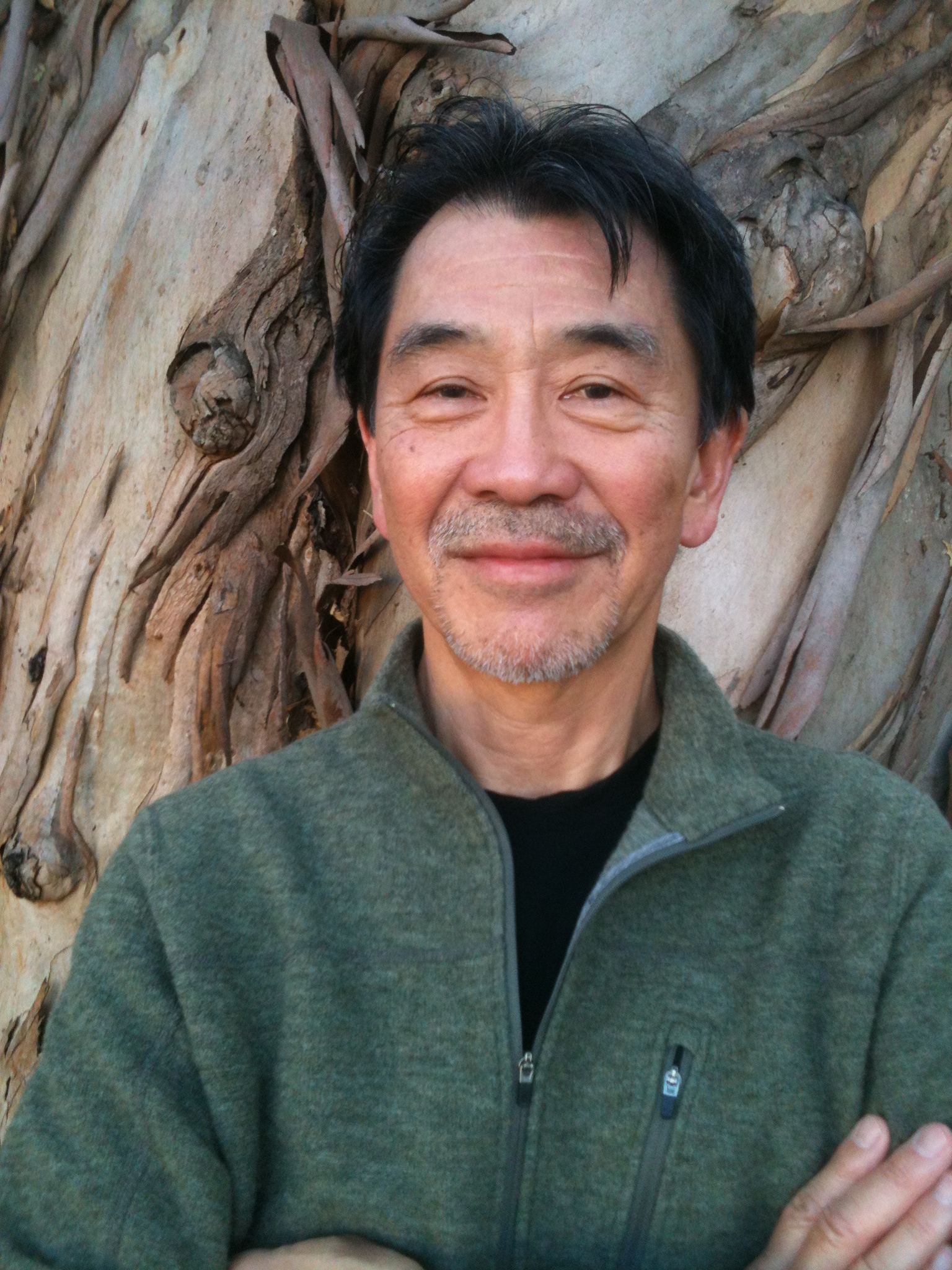
- Photo of Chew in 2013 by Liv Torgerson
- Born: Richard Franklin Chew; June 28, 1940 (age 86); Los Angeles, California, U.S.
- Occupation: Film editor
- Years active: 1967–present
- Spouse: Liv Torgerson
- Awards: Best Film Editing; 1977 Star Wars; Saturn Award for Outstanding Editing; 1977 Star Wars

Richard Franklin Chew (born June 28, 1940) is an American film editor, best known for his Academy Award-winning work on Star Wars (1977), alongside Paul Hirsch and Marcia Lucas. Other notable films include One Flew Over the Cuckoo's Nest (1975), Risky Business (1983), Waiting to Exhale (1995), That Thing You Do! (1996), and I Am Sam (2001). His career over a variety of films spans more than four decades.

== Early life and career ==
Born of Chinese immigrant parents in Los Angeles, Chew attended its inner-city schools, served in the U.S. Navy, and graduated from UCLA with a B.A. in Philosophy. After a stint at Harvard Law School, Chew, inspired by the independent cinema of the 1960s, left school to pursue a film career.

Starting with camera and editing work on documentaries, such as The Redwoods, an Oscar winner for Best Short Documentary in 1967, he eventually transitioned to editing feature films as co-editor on Francis Ford Coppola's The Conversation, Miloš Forman's One Flew Over the Cuckoo’s Nest, and George Lucas's Star Wars.

During his varied career, he has edited films for actor-directors such as Jack Nicholson, Tom Hanks, and Forest Whitaker. Other writer-directors with whom Chew has worked include: Cameron Crowe, Paul Brickman, Bruce Joel Rubin, and Emilio Estevez.

Chew was Oscar-nominated for One Flew Over the Cuckoo’s Nest. He also won British Oscars (BAFTA) as co-editor on both The Conversation and One Flew Over the Cuckoo’s Nest. His work on Shanghai Noon was nominated for Best Feature Comedy by American Cinema Editors.

At various times throughout his editing career, Chew has taught and lectured with the goal of enhancing audience appreciation for the cinema arts. For over thirty years, he has appeared at art schools and colleges, churches, and community groups.

On January 27, 2011, he was honored at the Detroit Institute of Arts with “An Evening with Richard Chew,” a program featuring clips of some of his extensive work plus an interview conducted by DIA film curator Elliot Wilhelm. Additionally, Chew was named Allessee Visiting Professor of Media at Wayne State University for the 2011 Spring semester. In September 2013, Chew was selected as a Duncan Littlefair Great Speaker in the Creation Talks Series (http://www.creationtalks.org/about-us/duncan-littlefair-great-speakers/), joining the ranks of renowned speakers from the worlds of politics and arts. He spoke about the power of music in film at the legendary Fountain Street Church in Grand Rapids, Michigan. . In November, 2016, Chew received the Third Annual Andrew V. McLaglen Lifetime Achievement Award from Friday Harbor Film Festival (Washington).

For his body of work, American Cinema Editors, an honorary society of film editors, presented to Chew the ACE Career Achievement Award during its annual Eddies Award show in March, 2022. In closing his acceptance speech, Chew said, “I’m thinking maybe we (filmmakers) could make movies to entertain and send a message. Maybe we could use movies to encourage the better angels of our nature.”

He is a member of the Academy of Motion Picture Arts & Sciences, Motion Picture Editors Guild, and American Cinema Editors.

== Selected filmography ==
Editor
Year	Film	Director	Notes
1974	The Conversation	Francis Ford Coppola	
1977	Star Wars	George Lucas	
1978	Goin' South	Jack Nicholson	
1979	When You Comin' Back, Red Ryder?	Milton Katselas	
1982	My Favorite Year	Richard Benjamin	
1983	Risky Business	Paul Brickman	First collaboration with Paul Brickman
1985	Real Genius	Martha Coolidge	First collaboration with Martha Coolidge
1985	Creator	Ivan Passer	
1986	Where the River Runs Black	Christopher Cain	
1986	Streets of Gold	Joe Roth	First collaboration with Joe Roth
1987	Revenge of the Nerds II: Nerds in Paradise	Joe Roth	Second collaboration with Joe Roth
1988	Clean and Sober	Glenn Gordon Caron	
1990	Men Don't Leave	Paul Brickman	Second collaboration with Paul Brickman
1991	Late for Dinner	W. D. Richter	
1992	Singles	Cameron Crowe	
1993	Mi Vida Loca	Allison Anders	
1993	My Life	Bruce Joel Rubin	
1995	Tall Tale	Jeremiah S. Chechik	
1995	Waiting to Exhale	Forest Whitaker	First collaboration with Forest Whitaker
1996	That Thing You Do!	Tom Hanks	
1998	Hope Floats	Forest Whitaker	Second collaboration with Forest Whitaker
2000	Shanghai Noon	Tom Dey	
2001	I Am Sam	Jessie Nelson	
2004	First Daughter	Forest Whitaker	Third collaboration with Forest Whitaker
2005	The New World	Terrence Malick	
2006	Bobby	Emilio Estevez	First collaboration with Emilio Estevez
2010	The Runaways	Floria Sigismondi	
2010	Louis	Daniel Pritzker	
2010	The Way	Emilio Estevez	Second collaboration with Emilio Estevez
2018	The Public	Emilio Estevez	Third collaboration with Emilio Estevez
2019	I'll Find You	Martha Coolidge	Second collaboration with Martha Coolidge

Editorial department
Year	Film	Director	Role
1975	One Flew Over the Cuckoo's Nest	Miloš Forman	Supervising film editor
2003	Shanghai Knights	David Dobkin	Additional editor
2013	Sugar	Rotimi Rainwater	Consulting editor

Additional crew
Year	Film	Director	Role
1992	Singles	Cameron Crowe	Title supervisor

Producer
Year	Film	Director	Credit
1987	Revenge of the Nerds II: Nerds in Paradise	Joe Roth	Associate producer
1992	Singles	Cameron Crowe	Co-producer

Second unit director or assistant director
Year	Film	Director	Role
1992	Singles	Cameron Crowe	Second unit director

Sound department
Year	Film	Director	Role
1975	Smile	Michael Ritchie	Sound editor

Thanks
Year	Film	Director	Role
2001	Monkeybone	Henry Selick	The producers wish to thank
2009	The Red Machine	Stephanie Argy; Alec Boehm	Special thanks

Documentaries

Editor
Year	Film	Director
1967	The Redwoods	Trevor Greenwood
1968	Have You Heard of the San Francisco Mime Troupe?	Don Lenzer; Fred Wardenburg
1969	The Medium Is the Massage, You Know	Trevor Greenwood
1970	Imogen Cunningham, Photographer	John Korty

Camera and electrical department
Year	Film	Director	Role
1970	Woodstock	Michael Wadleigh	Additional photographer
1974	Janis	Howard Alk	Additional photography

Cinematographer
Year	Film	Director
1967	The Redwoods	Trevor Greenwood
1969	The Medium Is the Massage, You Know	Trevor Greenwood

Shorts

Editorial department
Year	Film	Director	Role
2012	Lil Tokyo Reporter	Jeffrey Gee Chin	Editing consultant

Thanks
Year	Film	Director	Role
2011	Pass the Salt, Please	Tatjana Najdanovic	Very special thanks

TV movies

Editorial department
Year	Film	Director	Role
1972	The People	John Korty	Associate film editor

Thanks
Year	Film	Director	Role
1984	The Ratings Game	Danny DeVito	Special thanks

TV series

Editorial department
Year	Title	Role	Notes
1982	American Playhouse	Editorial consultant	1 episode

TV shorts

Editor
Year	Film	Director
1974	The Music School	John Korty
1976	The Other Side of Victory	Bill Jersey

TV specials

Thanks
Year	Film	Director	Role
1976	TVTV Looks at the Academy Awards	Wendy Apple	Thanks

== Awards ==
Film

Awards
Year	Film	Role
1975	The Conversation	BAFTA Film Award - Best Film Editing
1976	One Flew Over the Cuckoo's Nest	BAFTA Film Award - Best Film Editing; Nominated - Academy Award for Best Film Editing; Nominated - Eddie Award for Best Edited Feature Film
1978	Star Wars	Academy Award for Best Film Editing; Saturn Award for Outstanding Editing; Nominated - BAFTA Film Award for Best Film Editing; Nominated - Eddie Award for Best Edited Feature Film
2001	Shanghai Noon	Nominated - Eddie Award for Best Edited Feature Film - Comedy or Musical

Shorts

Awards
Year	Film	Role
1968	The Redwoods	Academy Award for Best Documentary (Short Subject)
