= Underdog (2007 film) =

Film by Frederik Du Chau

- Theatrical release poster
- Directed by: Frederik Du Chau
- Screenplay by: Adam Rifkin; Joe Piscatella; Craig A. Williams
- Story by: Joe Piscatella; Craig A. Williams; Adam Rifkin
- Based on: Underdog by: W. Watts Biggers; Chet Stover; Joe Harris
- Produced by: Gary Barber; Roger Birnbaum; Jay Polstein; Jonathan Glickman
- Starring: Jim Belushi; Peter Dinklage; John Slattery; Patrick Warburton; Brad Garrett; Amy Adams; Jason Lee
- Cinematography: David Eggby
- Edited by: Tom Finan
- Music by: Randy Edelman
- Production companies: Walt Disney Pictures; Spyglass Entertainment; Classic Media
- Distributed by: Buena Vista Pictures Distribution
- Release date: August 3, 2007
- Running time: 84 minutes
- Country: United States
- Language: English
- Budget: $25 million
- Box office: $65.3 million

Underdog is a 2007 American superhero film loosely based on the 1960s animated television series of the same name, which in turn is a spoof on the DC Comics character Superman. Directed by Frederik Du Chau, the film stars Jason Lee as the voice of the titular canine, alongside Jim Belushi, Peter Dinklage, John Slattery, and Patrick Warburton in live-action roles, with Brad Garrett and Amy Adams in voice roles. The story follows a diminutive hound who becomes a superhero after gaining superpowers from an accident at an evil scientist's lab, and becomes adopted by a 15 year old boy. Unlike the TV series, the titular character is portrayed as a realistic dog rather than an anthropomorphic one.

Underdog was released in theaters on August 3, 2007. The film received generally negative reviews from critics and grossed $65.3 million worldwide on a $25 million budget, becoming a box-office bomb.

== Plot ==
In the Capital City Town Hall, a beagle on the police bomb squad sets off a false alarm. Ridiculed and rejected, the beagle leaves and is abducted by Cad Lackey, who takes him to the lab of mad scientist Simon Barsinister. Bitter that his proposal for genetic experimentation was declined, Barsinister plans to prove his theory by testing his new serum on the beagle. The beagle escapes and runs amok in the lab, starting a fire and becoming exposed to various chemicals, which modify his DNA and give him superpowers.

After his escape, the beagle avoids an encounter with a Rottweiler named Riff Raff and his lackeys. A man named Dan Unger accidentally strikes the beagle with his car, but the dog is unharmed. Dan takes him home and names him Shoeshine after the dog licks his shoes, but his teenage son, Jack, becomes jealous of Shoeshine's attention. Dan retired from the police to spend more time with Jack after his wife died but still seems busy. Unaware of his new powers, Shoeshine accidentally makes a large mess when left home alone. When Jack returns, Shoeshine surprises them both by verbally apologizing. After the initial shock passes, Jack and Shoeshine bond over their respective attraction to Molly and Polly, Jack's friend and her dog. The two then test Shoeshine's powers, discovering he has super speed, strength, hearing, and smell in the process.

When Molly and Polly are mugged, Shoeshine rushes to their aid, discovering that he can fly. After discreetly rescuing them, Shoeshine returns home with Jack, who makes him promise to never reveal his powers. Cad shows up looking for Shoeshine, but Jack fools him into leaving. Barsinister and Cad later find a new lair beneath the city and plan a robbery to fund the reconstruction of his lab. Seeing Cad's heist on the news, Jack convinces Shoeshine to intervene. Shoeshine disguises himself as a fish, saves the hostages, and defeats two robbers; Cad, however, escapes. Adopting the alias "Underdog", Shoeshine becomes the city's resident superhero, donning a shrunken red sweater and blue cape as his outfit.

Barsinister repeatedly fails to recreate his serum and sends Cad to obtain a sample of Underdog's DNA. Cad fails to capture Underdog, but obtains his collar, which contains his true name and address. Barsinister and Cad kidnap Dan and force him to call Shoeshine for help. Shoeshine and Jack attempt a rescue, but Simon takes Jack and Dan as hostages to convince Shoeshine to give up his DNA. Barsinister synthesizes Underdog's superpowers, feeds Shoeshine an antidote to the serum, and gives the super pills to three trained German Shepherds. He and Cad leave the family trapped in the sewers, but Dan's police experience allows him to free everyone. They pursue Barsinister with a hypodermic needle filled with the antidote.

At the City Hall, Barsinister takes the mayor hostage and instructs Cad to attach a bomb rigged with a mind control serum to the roof; Molly and Polly follow Cad. Shoeshine smells the bomb and, overcoming his self-doubt, enters the building. Cad discovers Molly and Polly, captures them, and ties them up. During a scuffle with Barsinister, Shoeshine accidentally rips open Barsinister’s pocket and swallows a super pill, restoring his powers. Shoeshine takes the giant ball and knocks Cad unconscious. Shoeshine temporarily incapacitates the German Shepherds after he hears Molly and Polly call for help, but Barsinister ingests a pill and distracts Shoeshine. When the German Shepherds recover, Shoeshine convinces them to turn on Barsinister, who has not treated them well. While they restrain Barsinister, Underdog appears on the roof and saves Molly and Polly, cut off ties them up, instructing them to take the mind control serum to the police while he removes the bomb. After being reinstated and promoted by the mayor, Dan arrives and injects Barsinister with the antidote while arresting him. Underdog takes the bomb and buries it underground just before it explodes. Although he tries to escape, he is caught in the explosion, launched into space, and presumed dead. Amidst a mournful crowd, Underdog revives, leaving everyone overjoyed. Shoeshine returns to protecting Capital City as Underdog.

== Cast ==
- Jason Lee as Shoeshine / Underdog, a Beagle who becomes Jack's dog and a superhero to protect Capital City from Simon Barsinister.
- Peter Dinklage as Dr. Simon Barsinister, a mad scientist and Underdog's archenemy.
- Jim Belushi as Dan Unger, a former police officer turned security guard.
- Alex Neuberger as Jack Unger, the son of Dan who befriends Shoeshine.
- Taylor Momsen as Molly, Jack's friend and Polly's owner.
- Patrick Warburton as Cad Lackey, Simon Barsinister's henchman.
- John Slattery as the Mayor of Capital City
- Amy Adams as Polly Purebred, a Cavalier King Charles Spaniel and Molly's dog who is the love interest of Shoeshine/Underdog.
- Brad Garrett as Riff Raff, a Rottweiler and the leader of a gang of bully dogs.
- John DiMaggio as Bulldog, one of the bully dogs.
  - DiMaggio also voices a Supershep
- Cam Clarke as Little Brown Dog, one of the bully dogs.
  - Clarke also voices a Attack ("Supershep #3")
- Phil Morris as Maim ("Supershep #1")
- Michael Massee as Kill ("Supershep #2")
- Samantha Bee as Principal Helen L. Patterson, the principal of Jack and Molly's school.
- Susie Castillo as Diana Flores
- Timothy Crowe as the Chief of Police
- Frank L. Ridley as Police Sergeant
- Jay Leno as Himself (cameo)
- Danny Mastrogiorgio as Crazy Dog
- Jess Harnell as Astronaut

== Production ==
In June 2002, it was announced Spyglass Entertainment had acquired the rights to Underdog from rights holders Classic Media for a preemptive bid of over $2 million with the intent on adapting it as a live-action film for Walt Disney Pictures.

In June 2005, it was announced Spyglass and Disney were finalizing negotiations with the possibility of starting production that fall in Canada. By August of that year, Frederik Du Chau was announced to be in final negotiations to direct the film.

== Release ==
Underdog opened on August 3, 2007, in 3,013 theaters across the United States. It earned $11,585,121 on its opening weekend, placing in third behind The Bourne Ultimatum and the second weekend of The Simpsons Movie. The film closed on December 13, 2007, having grossed $43.8 million in the US box office and $21.5 million overseas for a worldwide total of $65.3 million. The film was released on DVD and Blu-ray on December 18, 2007.

== Soundtrack ==
The licensed soundtrack album is only available as a download on various online music stores. It contains the original score by Randy Edelman and the hip hop rendition of the Underdog theme title, "Underdog Raps", performed by then-Disney star Kyle Massey, which received airplay on Radio Disney. The Plain White T's rendition of the theme, titled "Underdog Rocks", plays at the beginning of the film but was not included on the album.

== Reception ==
On Rotten Tomatoes, the film has an approval rating of 14% based on 69 reviews and an average rating of 4.1/10. The site's critical consensus reads, "Underdog is a mostly forgettable adaptation that relies far too heavily on recycled material and sloppy production." On Metacritic, the film has a score of 37 out of 100 based on 16 critics, indicating "generally unfavorable reviews". Audiences polled by CinemaScore gave the film an average grade of "A−" on an A+ to F scale.

== See also ==
- 2007 in film
