= I Can't Make Music =

1972 song by Randy Edelman

"I Can't Make Music" is a song written, performed and recorded by Randy Edelman for his album The Laughter and the Tears (1972). The lyrics follow the subject afraid of the future of a relationship, using an inability to compose music on a piano as a metaphor. It was later, and most notably, recorded at A&M Studios by The Carpenters, duo of Karen and Richard Carpenter, for their fifth studio album Now & Then (1973). It closed the album's A-side named Now, dominated by six current (at the time) songs. The B-side, Then entirely consisted of "Yesterday Once More" and an oldies medley. Both contemporaneous and retrospective critics and music writers gave positive reviews of The Carpenters' recording in general.

== Randy Edelman version ==
"I Can't Make Music"

Song by Randy Edelman

from the album The Laughter and the Tears
- Released: 1972
- Studio: Devonshire Sound (North Hollywood, Los Angeles)
- Length: 2:58
- Label: Lion
- Songwriter: Randy Edelman
- Producer: Michael Stewart

The writer of "I Can't Make Music" was Randy Edelman, an emerging New Jersey songwriter who was also an occasional opening act for The Carpenters before Now & Then. Edelman also performed the song when opening for the duo. A 2:58 version was recorded by him and produced by Michael Stewart for his album The Laughter and the Tears (1972), where it was the opener. Record World, reviewing the album, called his version "lovely". The song depicts the subject afraid to keep having a successful relationship with their partner: "I’d like to wish you luck and hope / That life will be with someone else / Just like I thought it would be with me / But I can't see." It uses an allegory of an inability to compose an impressive piece of music "with an old piano in a vacant room". The chorus is, "And I can't make music / No, I can't make rhyme / No, I can't do anything / To take me away this time".

=== Personnel ===
Credits adapted from the liner notes of The Laughter and the Tears.

- Randy Edelman – vocals, keyboards, arrangement
- Michael Stewart – production
- Ron Malo – engineer
- John Guerin – drums
- Lyle Ritz – bass
- Artisan Sound Recorders – mastering

== The Carpenters version ==
"I Can't Make Music"

Song by The Carpenters

from the album Now & Then
- Released: May 1, 1973
- Recorded: February 16, 1973; March 10, 1973
- Studio: A&M Studios (Hollywood, Los Angeles); Whitney Recording Studio (Glendale, California)
- Genre: Pop
- Length: 3:17
- Label: A&M
- Songwriter: Randy Edelman
- Producer: The Carpenters

=== Background ===
American duo The Carpenters, consisting of drummer and lead vocalist Karen Carpenter and pianist and producer Richard Carpenter, recorded a 3:17 version for their fifth studio album Now & Then (1973). The vocals and most instruments of The Carpenters' version of "I Can't Make Music" were recorded at Studio B of A&M Studios on 16-track, 2" tape. An exception was the pipe organ, recorded at Whitney Recording Studio in Glendale, California. The orchestra was recorded on February 16, 1973, the harmonica March 10. First-chair violinist Jimmy Getzoff, who performed a solo on the song's outro, is uncredited on Now & Then's sleeve. The instrumental backing is a climax to a complete arrangement of piano, pipe organ and strings, preceding a calm ending led by a harmonica and violin.

Now & Then was first released on May 1, 1973, by A&M Records. A triple-vinyl limited edition box set released that year, named The Carpenters Collection, also included the song. A remix of "I Can't Make Music" by Roger Young appeared on the Japanese double CD compilation album Treasures (1987), and a UK-only Reader's Digest CD compilation Magical Memories Of The Carpenters (1993). Another Japan-only compilation of Carpenters tracks, By Request (2000), included the original mix of the song.

=== Contemporaneous reviews ===
A review in Cash Box predicted "I Can't Make Music" to be a future hit. In a review of Now & Then for The Pittsburgh Press, Tony Polermo called "I Can't Make Music" a beautiful close to the A-side, highlighting the contrast in tone from Edelman's typically "bright, cheerful" material. "Beautiful" was also used by Victor Stanton of the Waterloo Region Record to summarize the Carpenters' treatment as "beautiful torch-song". Lincoln Journal Star's Holly Spence highlighted the "happy feeling" on "I Can't Make Music" as well as "Sing". Conversely, Lester Bangs summarized "I Can't Make Music" as a "hymn of despair" a la "Sometimes I Feel So Uninspired" by Traffic.

Peter Barsocchini, who later became a screenwriter of High School Musical (2006), wrote an unfavorable review of Now & Then for The San Mateo Times. It concluded with, "Interestingly enough, The Carpenters may either be young enough or old enough to be quite ingenuous, because the title of the last song of side two, 'I Can't Make Music.' To which one can only add, right on." Richard, in 1988, recalled reading that portion and not taking it well: "Wait a minute! You may not like the style of our music, but don't tell me we can't make music."

=== Retrospective coverage ===
Randy Schmidt, writing a Karen Carpenter biography published in 2010, opined the composition was "perfectly suited" for the duo. A 2014 deep dive into The Carpenters' discography by Richard Havers claimed "I Can't Make Music" was "almost hidden away" on the first side, but was "a great pop song, with lovely lyrics, expertly done". For The Suburban's Joel Goldenberg, it was one of his all-time favorite songs from The Carpenters, acclaiming Karen as "wonderfully vulnerable". A more middling opinion came from Richard E. Cook of the online magazine Perfect Sound Forever, who stated she "sounds as if she's going through the motions".

In The Carpenters: The Untold Story, Ray Coleman interpreted it as foreshadowing the struggles she would face two years after Now & Then's release, being about the loss of creative spark. This created an "awful eeriness" for those aware of the story of the duo, particularly Karen. He also noted its significance as the only introspective song on a generally joyous album.

=== Personnel ===
Credits from the liner notes of Then & Now.

- Richard Carpenter – keyboards, lead and backing vocals, arranger, orchestration, producer
- Karen Carpenter – drums, lead and backing vocals, producer
- Joe Osborn – bass guitar
- Bob Messenger – flute, tenor saxophone
- Doug Strawn – baritone saxophone
- Tom Scott – recorder
- Tony Peluso – lead and rhythm guitars
- Gary Sims – rhythm guitar
- Buddy Emmons – steel guitar
- Jay Dee Maness – steel guitar
- Earl Dumler – oboe, bass oboe, English horn
- Ray Gerhardt – engineer
- Roger Young – assistant engineer
- Bernie Grundman – mastering engineer
