= Pontiac Moon =

1994 film by Peter Medak

- Theatrical release poster
- Directed by: Peter Medak
- Screenplay by: Finn Taylor; Jeffrey D. Brown
- Story by: Finn Taylor
- Produced by: Robert Schaffel; Youssef Vahabzadeh
- Starring: Ted Danson; Mary Steenburgen; Eric Schweig; Cathy Moriarty
- Cinematography: Thomas Kloss
- Edited by: Anne V. Coates
- Music by: Randy Edelman
- Distributed by: Paramount Pictures
- Release date: November 4, 1994
- Running time: 108 minutes
- Country: United States
- Language: English

Pontiac Moon is a 1994 adventure film directed by Peter Medak, and produced by Robert Schaffel and Youssef Vahabzadeh.

The film stars Ted Danson as Washington Bellamy, a "pigheaded" science teacher in a small town of California, as well as Mary Steenburgen as his wife Katherine. Danson was also one of three executive producers of the film, along with Jeffrey D. Brown (co-writer) and Robert Benedetti.

== Plot ==
The film takes place in the summer of 1969, when NASA astronauts successfully landed on the Moon for the first time, in the Apollo 11 spacecraft.

Katherine Bellamy, suffering from panic attacks caused by an automobile accident which resulted in the loss of their unborn child, has agoraphobia. In contrast, her husband Washington Bellamy is a man of adventure who enjoys travel and experiencing life. As a result of the conflict between them, their 11-year-old son Andy has never traveled in a car, nor has he ever left town.

Washington, who also maintains a ragtag collection of automobiles of various vintages, decides to travel with Andy to the Spires of the Moon National Park (a fictitious park possibly based on Craters of the Moon National Monument and Preserve). They plan to arrive at the very moment that the Apollo 11 crew lands on the Moon.

They make the trip in Washington's 1949 Pontiac Eight Chieftain DeLuxe convertible (the grille indicates it's a 1950) nicknamed "Old Chief". The car's mileage, when arriving at its destination, will be exactly the distance in miles from the Earth to the Moon. On the way they make some enemies, new friends, and learn the meaning of family.

When Katherine finds out where her husband and son are going, she faces her fears (she hasn't been out the house for seven years), and follows them in one of Washington's cars, an Amphicar. She learns the importance of living as she follows the Pontiac to Spires of the Moon.

On the way, the Pontiac's engine dies, and Washington arranges for a mechanic to install a replacement one, only to leave the premises without paying for it as he doesn't have enough money to pay. At the moment of the Apollo 11 landing, the Pontiac crashes into a crater at Spires of the Moon, with Andy at the wheel. Katherine arrives, and they escape a police chase by driving the Amphicar into a lake to Canada and safety.

The adventure brings the Bellamy family together, and they are now ready to begin a more normal life.

== Cast ==
- Ted Danson as Washington Bellamy
- Mary Steenburgen as Katherine Bellamy
- Ryan Todd as Andy Bellamy
- Eric Schweig as Ernest Ironplume
- Cathy Moriarty as Lorraine
- Max Gail as Jerome Bellamy

== Production ==
Parts of the film were shot in Cisco, Crescent Junction, Ruby Ranch Road, and Arches National Park in Utah. Benson, Arizona was another one of the filming locations for Paramount's 1994 film Pontiac Moon.

== Year-end lists ==
- 4th worst – Bob Strauss, Los Angeles Daily News
