= Owen Wilson =

American actor (born 1968)

- Wilson in 2026
- Born: Owen Cunningham Wilson; November 18, 1968 (age 58); Dallas, Texas, U.S.
- Occupations: Actor; screenwriter; producer
- Years active: 1994–present
- Children: 3
- Parents: Laura Wilson; Robert Wilson
- Relatives: Andrew Wilson (brother); Luke Wilson (brother)
- Awards: Full list

Owen Cunningham Wilson (born November 18, 1968) is an American actor, screenwriter and producer. His accolades include nominations for an Academy Award, two Actor Awards, a BAFTA Award, a Golden Globe Award, and an Independent Spirit Award.

Wilson is known for his frequent collaborations with filmmaker Wes Anderson, having met as college roommates while attending the University of Texas at Austin. They shared writing and acting credits on the films Bottle Rocket (1996), Rushmore (1998), and The Royal Tenenbaums (2001), for which the pair received a nomination for the Academy Award for Best Original Screenplay. He also appeared in Anderson's The Life Aquatic with Steve Zissou (2004), The Darjeeling Limited (2007), Fantastic Mr. Fox (2009), The Grand Budapest Hotel (2014), and The French Dispatch (2021).

Wilson gained wider recognition as part of a group of comedic actors, colloquially known as the Frat Pack, with whom he starred in several successful comedy films. These films include Meet the Parents (2000), Zoolander (2001), Starsky & Hutch (2004), Wedding Crashers (2005), You, Me and Dupree (2006), and The Internship (2013). He also starred in the Shanghai films (2000–2003) with Jackie Chan, the Night at the Museum films (2006–2014), and the voice of Lightning McQueen in Pixar's Cars franchise (2006–present). His other successes include the action films Anaconda (1997), Armageddon (1998), Behind Enemy Lines (2001), and No Escape (2015); the horror film The Haunting (1999); and the comedy-dramas Marley & Me (2008) and Midnight in Paris (2011).

On television, Wilson made his Marvel Cinematic Universe debut as Mobius M. Mobius in the Disney+ series Loki (2021–2023) and recently starred in the Apple TV sports comedy series Stick (2025).

== Early life ==
Wilson was born in Dallas, the middle child of three sons of photographer Laura Cunningham Wilson (b. 1939) and Robert Andrew Wilson (1941–2017), an advertising executive and operator of a public television station. His brothers Andrew and Luke are also actors. Wilson's parents are of Irish descent. As a teenager, Wilson broke his nose twice: the first time in a high school fight, and the second time playing football with friends. "You know, probably my nose wouldn't have been that great even if it hadn't been broken," Wilson told The Los Angeles Times.

After getting expelled from high school for cheating in geometry, he attended New Mexico Military Institute. He later attended the University of Texas at Austin, where he pursued a Bachelor of Arts degree in English, but did not graduate. While in college, he met and was roommates with Wes Anderson, who became a director and frequent collaborator.

== Career ==
=== 1994–1999: Early films and breakthrough ===
Wilson made his film debut acting in the Wes Anderson short film Bottle Rocket (1994), which was later expanded into the feature-length film Bottle Rocket (1996). Wilson co-wrote the screenplay with Anderson, and acted opposite his brother Luke Wilson. David Hunter of The Hollywood Reporter praised the film, saying, "A marvelous debut film for its director, writer and lead actors, Bottle Rocket is propelled by a fresh approach to the caper genre". That same year, he had a supporting role in the black comedy The Cable Guy (1996), starring Jim Carrey and directed by Ben Stiller, an early admirer of Bottle Rocket. Wilson played Leslie Mann's date in the film. In 1997, he had a role in the adventure thriller Anaconda and executive produced the James L. Brooks comedy As Good as It Gets.

In 1998, Wilson had roles in the science fiction disaster film Armageddon and the independent drama film Permanent Midnight.

He also reunited with Anderson, co-writing the script for his next two films, Rushmore and The Royal Tenenbaums, which Anderson directed. The pair garnered an Oscar nomination for Best Original Screenplay for 'Tenenbaums'. Wilson did not act in Rushmore, but was shown briefly in a photograph in the film. After appearing in supporting roles in 1999, he acted in the horror films The Haunting and The Minus Man. His future girlfriend, singer Sheryl Crow, was a co-star in the latter film.

=== 2000–2006: Film stardom ===
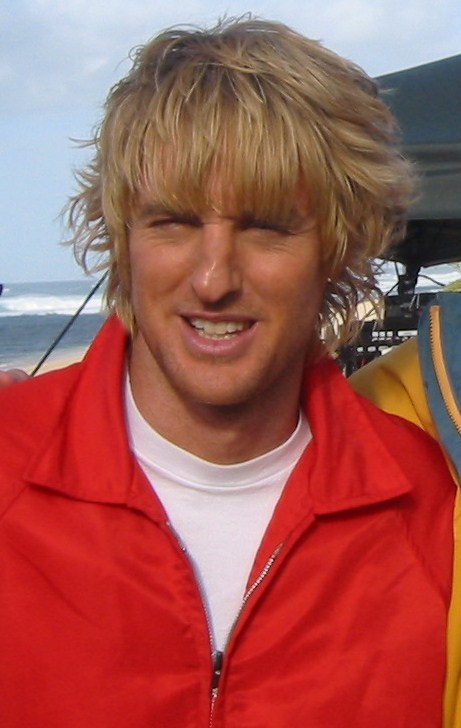
Wilson in 2003

Wilson starred in the 2000 comedy action film Shanghai Noon alongside Jackie Chan. The film grossed nearly $100 million worldwide. His fame continued to rise after starring alongside Ben Stiller and Will Ferrell in the 2001 film Zoolander. Gene Hackman reportedly took notice of Wilson's performance in Shanghai Noon and recommended the actor to co-star in the 2001 action film Behind Enemy Lines. Also in 2001, Wilson and Anderson collaborated on their third film, The Royal Tenenbaums, a financial and critical success. The film earned the writing team an Academy Award nomination for Best Original Screenplay.

Wilson returned to the buddy-comedy genre in 2002 with the action comedy I Spy, co-starring Eddie Murphy. The big-screen remake of the same-named television series did not perform well at the box office. He made a cameo appearance in the Girl Skateboards video Yeah Right! in 2003. He then reunited with Chan to make Shanghai Knights (2003), and co-starred in the film remake of the 1970s television series Starsky & Hutch (2004). Due to his busy schedule as an actor and an ongoing sinus condition, Wilson was unavailable to collaborate on the script for Wes Anderson's fourth feature film, The Life Aquatic with Steve Zissou. The 2004 film was ultimately co-written by filmmaker Noah Baumbach. However, Wilson did star in the film as Bill Murray's would-be son, Ned Plimpton; it was a role written specifically for him. In 2004, he and his brother Luke played the Wright brothers in the 2004 film Around the World in 80 Days. Wilson is said to be attached to a sequel to Shanghai Knights, marking his third collaboration with Jackie Chan.

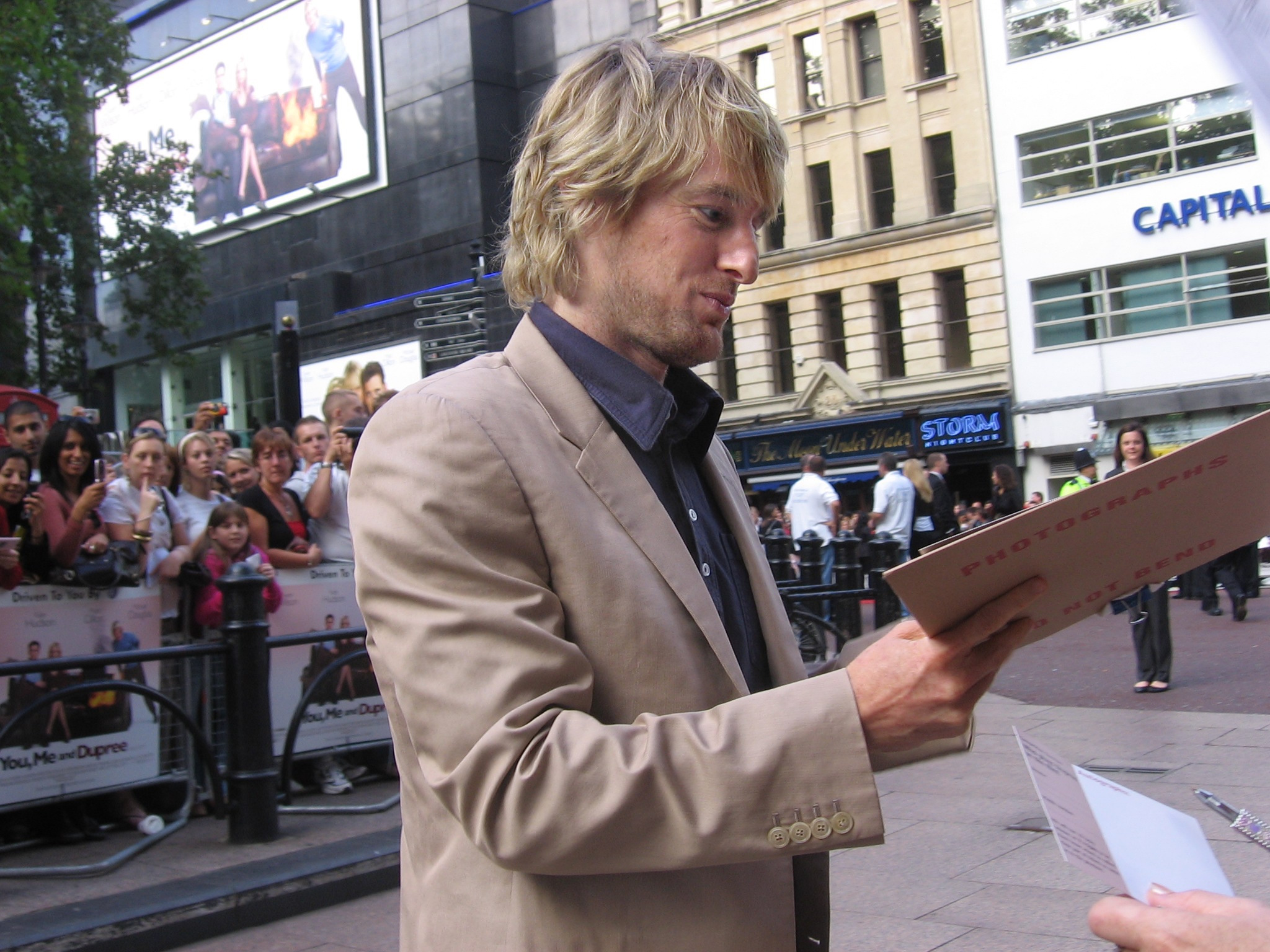
Wilson at the London premiere of You, Me and Dupree in 2006

Wilson partnered with Vince Vaughn in the 2005 comedy film Wedding Crashers, which grossed over $200 million in the United States alone. Also in 2005, Owen collaborated with his brothers in The Wendell Baker Story, written by Luke and directed by Luke and Andrew. In 2006, Wilson voiced Lightning McQueen in the Disney/Pixar film Cars, starred in You, Me and Dupree with Kate Hudson, and appeared with Stiller in Night at the Museum as cowboy Jedediah.

During this time, Wilson gained a reputation for frequently exclaiming "Wow!" in his roles, becoming something of a meme, as well as his trademark.

=== 2007–2015: Established career ===
Wilson appeared in another Wes Anderson film, The Darjeeling Limited, which screened at the 45th annual New York Film Festival, the Venice Film Festival, and opened September 30, 2007. It co-stars Jason Schwartzman and Adrien Brody. The Darjeeling Limited was selected for a DVD and Blu-ray release by The Criterion Collection in October 2010. Wilson next starred in the Judd Apatow comedy, Drillbit Taylor which was released in March 2008. He appeared in a film adaptation of John Grogan's best-selling memoir, Marley & Me (2008), co-starring Jennifer Aniston. He provided the voice for the Whackbat Coach Skip in Wes Anderson's stop motion animated film Fantastic Mr. Fox (2009). Wilson is a member of the comedic acting brotherhood colloquially known as the Frat Pack. Wilson made a guest appearance on the NBC comedy Community with fellow Frat Pack member Jack Black.

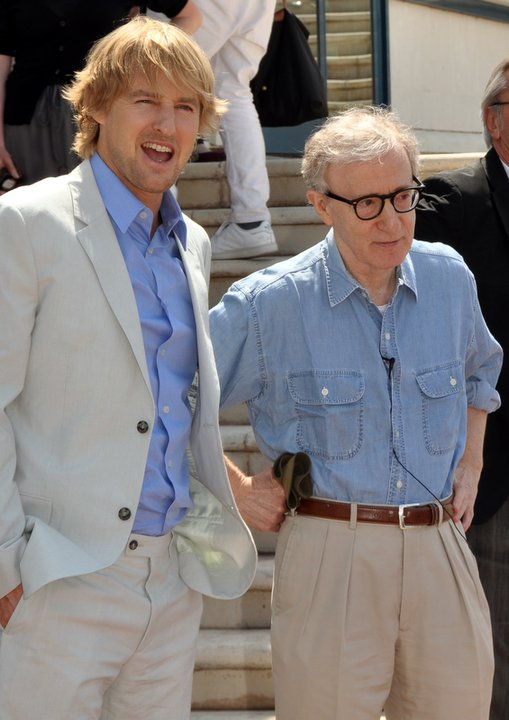
Wilson with Woody Allen at the Cannes Film Festival premiere of Midnight in Paris in 2011

In 2011, Wilson starred as a nostalgia-seized writer in the romantic comedy Midnight in Paris, written and directed by Woody Allen. The film premiered at the 64th Cannes Film Festival to critical acclaim. The film became Allen's highest grossing thus far, and was also well received by critics. Roger Ebert wrote of Wilson's performance, "[He] is a key to the movie's appeal". Peter Debruge of Variety also praised Wilson, writing "Wilson makes the role endearingly his own". For his performance, Wilson earned a nomination for the Golden Globe Award for Best Actor – Motion Picture Musical or Comedy.

That same year, he starred in the film The Big Year (2011) an adaptation of Mark Obmascik's book The Big Year: A Tale of Man, Nature and Fowl Obsession. The film was released in October 2011 by 20th Century Fox, and co-starred Jack Black, JoBeth Williams, Steve Martin and Rashida Jones. The same year, Wilson returned to voice McQueen in Cars 2. In March 2012, Wilson was signed to star in the John Erick Dowdle thriller The Coup, later renamed "No Escape", in which he played the role of the father of an American family that moves to Southeast Asia, only to find itself swept up in a wave of rebel violence that is overwhelming the city. The film was not released until 2015, and was Wilson's return to the action genre for the first time since Behind Enemy Lines in 2001. He also voiced turkey Reggie in Reel FX's first animated film, Free Birds.

In 2014, Wilson appeared in Wes Anderson's acclaimed ensemble comedy The Grand Budapest Hotel and in Paul Thomas Anderson's book adaptation of Inherent Vice. In 2015, he starred with Jennifer Aniston in Peter Bogdanovich's film She's Funny That Way, and in the action thriller film No Escape alongside Lake Bell and Pierce Brosnan. Wilson's films have grossed more than US$2.25 billion domestically (United States and Canada), with an average of US$75 million per film.

=== 2017–present ===
In 2017, Wilson again voiced Lightning McQueen in Cars 3, played a suburban father in the drama Wonder, and co-starred with Ed Helms in the comedy Father Figures. In November 2017, Wilson became the face of a new £20 million advertising campaign for the UK sofa retailer Sofology. He returned to work with Sofology in 2019 for a second advertising campaign.

In 2021, Wilson starred in the comedy film Bliss, directed by Mike Cahill opposite Salma Hayek for Amazon Studios. In 2021, Wilson also reunited with Wes Anderson for The French Dispatch, which premiered at the 2021 Cannes Film Festival. and Marry Me alongside Jennifer Lopez and directed by Kat Coiro for Universal Pictures.

From 2021 to 2023, Wilson starred in the Marvel Cinematic Universe series Loki opposite Tom Hiddleston on Disney+ as Mobius M. Mobius, a role he reprised in the 2023 film Ant-Man and the Wasp: Quantumania. He also signed on to star in a new film adaptation of The Haunted Mansion.

Wilson currently stars in Stick, an Apple TV+ comedy-drama series that premiered in June 2025.

== Personal life ==
In August 2007, Wilson attempted suicide and was subsequently treated for depression at St. John's Health Center and Cedars-Sinai Medical Center in Los Angeles. A few days after his hospitalization, Wilson withdrew from his role in Tropic Thunder. The incident resulted in much unwanted publicity for Wilson, and he became reluctant to do interviews. In a 2021 interview with Esquire, Wilson described how his brothers supported him during his recovery.

In January 2011, Wilson and his then-girlfriend Jade Duell had a son. Wilson and Duell ended their relationship later that year. In January 2014, he had a son with Caroline Lindqvist. In October 2018, he had a daughter with ex-girlfriend Varunie Vongsvirates.

== Filmography ==
=== Film ===
Year	Title	Role	Notes
1994	Bottle Rocket	Dignan	Short
1996	Bottle Rocket	Dignan	Also writer
1996	The Cable Guy	Robin's Date	
1997	Anaconda	Gary Dixon	
1997	As Good as It Gets	—N/a	Associate producer
1998	Armageddon	Oscar Choice	
1998	Permanent Midnight	Nicky	
1998	Rushmore	—N/a	Writer
1999	The Haunting	Luke Sanderson	
1999	Breakfast of Champions	Monte Rapid	
1999	The Minus Man	Vann Siegert	
2000	Shanghai Noon	Roy O'Bannon	
2000	Meet the Parents	Kevin Rawley	
2001	Zoolander	Hansel McDonald	
2001	The Royal Tenenbaums	Eli Cash	Also writer
2001	Behind Enemy Lines	Lt. Chris Burnett	
2002	I Spy	Alex Scott	
2002	The Sweatbox	Himself	Archive footage; haven't been released to the public
2003	Shanghai Knights	Roy O'Bannon	
2003	Yeah Right!	Himself	Cameo appearance
2004	The Big Bounce	Jack Ryan	
2004	Starsky & Hutch	Ken Hutchinson	
2004	Around the World in 80 Days	Wilbur Wright	
2004	The Life Aquatic with Steve Zissou	Ned Plimpton	
2004	Meet the Fockers	Kevin Rawley	
2005	The Wendell Baker Story	Neil King	
2005	Wedding Crashers	John Beckwith	
2006	Cars	Lightning McQueen	Voice role
2006	Mater and the Ghostlight	Lightning McQueen	Voice role; Short film
2006	You, Me and Dupree	Randolph Dupree	Also producer
2006	Night at the Museum	Jedediah	Uncredited
2007	The Darjeeling Limited	Francis Whitman	
2008	Drillbit Taylor	Drillbit Taylor	
2008	Marley & Me	John Grogan	
2009	Night at the Museum: Battle of the Smithsonian	Jedediah	
2009	Fantastic Mr. Fox	Coach Skip	Voice role
2010	Marmaduke	Marmaduke	Voice role
2010	How Do You Know	Matty Reynolds	
2010	Little Fockers	Kevin Rawley	
2011	Hall Pass	Richard "Rick" Mills	
2011	Midnight in Paris	Gil Pender	
2011	Cars 2	Lightning McQueen	Voice role
2011	The Big Year	Kenny Bostick	
2013	The Internship	Nick Campbell	
2013	Free Birds	Reggie	Voice role
2013	Are You Here	Steve Dallas	
2014	The Grand Budapest Hotel	M. Chuck	
2014	The Hero of Color City	Ricky The Dragon	Voice role
2014	Inherent Vice	Coy Harlingen	
2014	Night at the Museum: Secret of the Tomb	Jedediah	
2015	She's Funny That Way	Arnold Albertson	
2015	No Escape	Jack Dwyer	
2016	Zoolander 2	Hansel McDonald	
2016	Masterminds	Steve Chambers	
2017	Lost in London	Himself	
2017	Cars 3	Lightning McQueen	Voice role
2017	Wonder	Nate Pullman	
2017	Father Figures	Kyle Reynolds	
2021	Bliss	Greg Wittle	
2021	The French Dispatch	Herbsaint Sazerac	
2022	Marry Me	Charlie Gilbert	
2022	Secret Headquarters	Jack Kincaid / The Guard	
2023	Ant-Man and the Wasp: Quantumania	Mobius M. Mobius	Uncredited cameo; post-credits scene
2023	Paint	Carl Nargle	
2023	Haunted Mansion	Kent	
2026	Charlie the Wonderdog	Charlie	Voice role
2026	Runner	Ben Bishop	
2026	Avengers Endgame: Encore	Mobius M. Mobius	Uncredited; extended version of Avengers: Endgame
2026	Rolling Loud: The Movie	Hank	
2026	Focker-in-Law	Kevin Rawley	
2026	Avengers: Doomsday †	Mobius M. Mobius	Post-production
2027	Paris Paramount †	TBA	Post-production

Key
†	Denotes films that have not yet been released

=== Television ===
Year	Title	Role	Notes
1999	Heat Vision and Jack	Heat Vision	Voice; Short
2001	King of the Hill	Rhett Van Der Graaf	Voice; Episode: "Luanne Virgin 2.0"
2010	Community	Other Study Group's Leader	Episode: "Investigative Journalism"; uncredited
2013	Drunk History	John Harvey Kellogg	Episode: "Detroit"
2014	Cars Toons: Tales From Radiator Springs	Lightning McQueen	Voice; Episode: "The Radiator Springs 500 ½"
2016; 2021	Saturday Night Live	Hansel McDonald / Himself	2 episodes
2019	Documentary Now!	Father Ra-Shawbard	Episode: "Batsh*t Valley" (2 parts)
2021–2023	Loki	Mobius M. Mobius	Main role; 11 episodes
2021–2023	Marvel Studios: Assembled	Himself	2 episodes
2022	Cars on the Road	Lightning McQueen	Voice; Disney+ Original Short Series
2024	LEGO Pixar: BrickToons	Lightning McQueen	Voice; Episode: "Trust Yer Ol' Pal, Mater"
2025–present	Stick	Pryce Cahill	Lead role; also executive producer
2026	Rick and Morty	Reese	Voice; Episode: "A Ricker Runs Through It"
2027	Cars: Lightning Racers †	Lightning McQueen	Voice; Upcoming series

Key
†	Denotes television productions that have not yet been released

=== Video games ===
Year	Title	Role	Notes
2006	Cars	Lightning McQueen	Home console versions only
2012	Kinect Rush: A Disney-Pixar Adventure	Lightning McQueen	
2014	Cars: Fast as Lightning	Lightning McQueen	
2018	Lego The Incredibles	Lightning McQueen	
2023	Rocket League	Lightning McQueen	Part of the "Lightning McQueen" bundle
2026	Disney Speedstorm	Lightning McQueen	Part of the Season 18 update

=== Music videos ===
List of music videos, with year released and lead artist shown
Year	Song	Artist
2006	"God's Gonna Cut You Down"	Johnny Cash
2008	"You Don't Think I'm Funny Anymore"	Willie Nelson
2013	"Christmas in L.A."	The Killers

=== Theme park attractions ===
Year	Attraction	Role	Location	Notes
2012	Radiator Springs Racers	Lightning McQueen	Cars Land	
2019	Lightning McQueen's Racing Academy	Lightning McQueen	Disney's Hollywood Studios	Attraction closed in 2024

=== Commercials ===
Year	Title	Role	Notes
2017–2019	Sofology	Himself	
2023	Teardown	Narrator	Console launch trailer

== See also ==
- Frat Pack, group of actors he has appeared in several films with
