= Dan Mindel =

South African-American cinematographer (born 1958)

- Born: Ivor Daniel Mindel; May 27, 1958 (age 67); Johannesburg, South Africa
- Years active: 1983–present

Ivor Daniel Mindel, ASC, BSC, SASC (born 27 May 1958) is a South African-American cinematographer,.

Known for his preference for shooting on film and implementing the Panavision anamorphic format, Mindel's work is mostly based on blockbuster action films, and had a frequent collaboration with directors Tony Scott and J. J. Abrams.

== Early life ==
Mindel was born in Johannesburg and received education in Australia and in Britain.

== Career ==
He began his career as a camera loader before becoming a clapper loader and assistant cameraman on John Boorman's 1985 film, The Emerald Forest, under French cinematographer Philippe Rousselot. He soon after moved to the United States and began working on commercials for Ridley and Tony Scott, among several other directors.

Throughout the 1990s, Mindel worked as a camera operator or photographer on feature films directed by either Tony Scott or Ridley Scott, including Thelma & Louise and Crimson Tide. In 1997, Mindel was assigned as second unit director of photography on Ridley Scott's G.I. Jane. This opened the door for Mindel to become director of photography on Tony Scott's 1998 action-thriller, Enemy of the State.

Mindel went on to serve as director of photography for films such as Shanghai Noon, Stuck on You, The Skeleton Key, John Carter, and Tony Scott's Spy Game and Domino. He has also done additional photography for the films The Bourne Identity and Lions for Lambs.

Director J. J. Abrams selected Mindel to be director of photography on 2006's Mission: Impossible III. Mindel worked with Abrams again as the cinematographer of 2009's Star Trek and its follow-up, Star Trek Into Darkness.

Mindel was the director of photography on Star Wars: The Force Awakens, which was released on December 18, 2015. He was later announced to return to the franchise with Star Wars: The Rise of Skywalker, also directed by Abrams, which commenced filming on August 1, 2018, at Pinewood Studios.

Three years after the release of The Rise of Skywalker, Mindel worked on additional photography for the Marvel Studios films Doctor Strange in the Multiverse of Madness and Ant-Man and the Wasp: Quantumania.

== Personal life ==
Mindel is married to Lisa Fallon Mindel and has four children, Samuel, Eden, Molly and Lily.

== Filmography ==
Television

Year	Title	Director	Notes
1992	Red Shoe Diaries	Zalman King; Michael Kalbernikoff	3 episodes
1996	Dangerous Minds	James Hayman	Episode "Pilot"

Short film

Year	Title	Director
1996	Recon	Breck Eisner
1996	Snakeland	Joëlle Bentolila
2000	Killer Pink	Patrick Cadell
2004	Tooth Fairy	Jake Scott
2007	Cutlass	Kate Hudson

Feature film

Year	Title	Director	Notes
1998	Enemy of the State	Tony Scott	
2000	Shanghai Noon	Tom Dey	
2000	Sand	Matt Palmieri	With John Skotchdopole
2001	Spy Game	Tony Scott	
2003	Stuck on You	The Farrelly brothers	
2005	Domino	Tony Scott	
2005	The Skeleton Key	Iain Softley	
2006	Mission: Impossible III	J. J. Abrams	Also made a cameo as "Doctor" (Uncredited)
2009	Star Trek	J. J. Abrams	
2012	John Carter	Andrew Stanton	
2012	Savages	Oliver Stone	
2013	Star Trek Into Darkness	J. J. Abrams	
2014	The Amazing Spider-Man 2	Marc Webb	
2015	Star Wars: The Force Awakens	J. J. Abrams	
2016	Zoolander No. 2	Ben Stiller	
2018	The Cloverfield Paradox	Julius Onah	
2018	Pacific Rim: Uprising	Steven S. DeKnight	
2019	Star Wars: The Rise of Skywalker	J. J. Abrams	
2024	Twisters	Lee Isaac Chung	
2024	Red One	Jake Kasdan	
2027	Godzilla x Kong: Supernova	Grant Sputore	Filming
