= The Redwoods =

1967 film

- Directed by: Trevor Greenwood
- Written by: Trevor Greenwood
- Produced by: Trevor Greenwood; Mark Jonathan Harris
- Cinematography: Richard Chew
- Edited by: Richard Chew
- Production company: King Screen Productions
- Distributed by: Sierra Club
- Release date: 1967
- Country: United States
- Language: English

The Redwoods is a 1967 American short documentary film produced by Trevor Greenwood and Mark Jonathan Harris. It was produced for the Sierra Club as part of their campaign for a national park to protect the redwood forest. In 1968, it won an Oscar at the 40th Academy Awards for Documentary Short Subject.

== See also ==
- List of American films of 1967
