= Bollywoof =

- Directed by: Frederic Du Chau
- Screenplay by: Stephen Leslie
- Produced by: Andrew Baker; Laurie Cook; Gregory Gavanski; Jason Newmark; Nisha Parti; Bob Thompson
- Starring: David Jonsson; Kunal Nayyar; Olivia Colman; Ambika Mod; Sanjeev Bhaskar; Rhys Ifans
- Edited by: Kerrin Kokot
- Production companies: Prime Focus Studios; Cantilever Media; Newscope Films; Sky Cinema
- Distributed by: Vue Lumière
- Release dates: 15 November 2026 (LIFF); 22 January 2027 (United Kingdom)
- Running time: 95 minutes
- Country: United Kingdom
- Language: English

Bollywoof is an upcoming British animated comedy film directed by Frederic Du Chau. The film follows a dog who gets lost in the city of Kolkata, and teams up with a charismatic street dog and embark on a journey across India.

The film is scheduled to have its world premiere at the Leeds International Film Festival on 15 November 2026, before its theatrical release in the United Kingdom on 22 January 2027.

== Voice cast ==
- David Jonsson as Basil
- Olivia Colman
- Kunal Nayyar
- Rhys Ifans
- Sanjeev Bhaskar
- Ambika Mod

== Production ==
In October 2014, Kunal Nayyar was cast in the film, originally a live-action film titled Bollywoof Tale, with Frederic Du Chau directing and Jason Newmark and Nisha Parti producing. Principal photography was planned to commence at the first quarter of 2015, but never came to fruition. In February 2024, it was reported that Cantilever Media and Sky Cinema would produce the film, now simply titled Bollywoof, with Mikros Animation attached to provide animation services. In June 2025, Cantilever and ReDefine agreed on a deal to produce animated feature films, with Bollywoof being one of them; the latter would replace Mikros as the new animation provider, and Prime Focus Studios would co-produce the film. David Jonsson, Olivia Colman, Rhys Ifans, Sanjeev Bhaskar, and Ambika Mod were announced as the lead cast in September 2026. Kerrin Kokot edited the film.

== Release ==
Icon Film Distribution originally had distribution rights to the film by 2014. In February 2024, Embankment Films acquired the worldwide sales to the film. The film is scheduled to have its world premiere at the Leeds International Film Festival on 15 November 2026, before Vue Lumière will release it in the United Kingdom on 22 January 2027.
