= Zen Noir =

- Directed by: Marc Rosenbush
- Written by: Marc Rosenbush
- Produced by: Frank Crim; Erika Gardner; Marc Rosenbush
- Starring: Duane Sharp; Kim Chan; Debra Miller; Ezra Buzzington
- Cinematography: Christopher Gosch
- Edited by: Camden Toy
- Music by: Steven Chesne
- Release date: April 21, 2004 (Newport Beach International Film Festival)
- Running time: 71 minutes
- Country: United States
- Language: English

Zen Noir is a 2004 surrealist Buddhist murder mystery film directed by independent filmmaker Marc Rosenbush and starring Kim Chan, Duane Sharp, Ezra Buzzington, Debra Miller, Jennifer Siebel and Howard Fong.

== Plot ==
The story begins with a morose and brooding Detective (Duane Sharp) receiving a phone call from a local temple, saying someone is about to die. At the temple, a meditating monk (Howard Fong) is seen falling over, apparently dead. The Detective shows up moments afterwards and begins to question the other monks in the temple. He receives cryptic answers to all his queries from Ed (Ezra Buzzington), Jane (Debra Miller) and the Master (Kim Chan), to his rapidly growing frustration.

The Detective continues to treat the case as a murder, although both Jane and Ed insist that they did not kill the dead man. An agitated Ed directs the Detective to meet him at midnight for an unspecified purpose. In the meantime, the Detective rants at the Master, who remains unperturbed, before discovering that the Detective's gun is missing.

Ed meets with the Detective and commits suicide with the Detective's gun. The Detective, stunned by Ed's sudden death and haunted by visions of his deceased wife Nora (Jennifer Siebel), is comforted by Jane. The two eventually make love. Afterwards, the two talk, and the Detective is alarmed to realize that he cannot remember his own name.

Jane reveals that she is dying. Distressed, the Detective says he cannot go through the heartbreak of losing someone again, and goes to the Master for his insights on life and death. The master says that he does not know what happens when we die, because he is "not dead yet." He does, though, calm the Detective with a lecture on interconnectedness.

The Detective sits with the Master, who after a time also falls over, dead. The Detective continues to sit alone, at first sobbing, then at peace as Nora's ghost leaves him.

The film ends with a shaven-headed Detective sitting with Jane, holding hands. He asks Jane how long she has to live, and she says she does not know. The Detective accepts this, and they continue to sit together quietly.

== Awards ==
The film, which opened in theatres on September 15, 2006, has won several prestigious film festival awards.

- Grand Jury Award for Best Feature at the Washington DC Independent Film Festival
- Audience Award for Best Feature at the Rhode Island International Film Festival
- Best Feature at the Moondance Film Festival
- Best Actress at Indiefest Chicago
- Best Cinematography at the Ashland Independent Film Festival.
