= Frederic Du Chau =

Belgian film director and screenwriter

- Frederic Du Chau in 2026
- Born: 15 May 1965 (age 61); Ghent, Belgium
- Occupations: Film Director; Screenwriter; Animator
- Years active: 1989–present
- Known for: Quest for Camelot (1998), Racing Stripes (2005), Underdog (2007)

Frederic Du Chau (born 15 May 1965) is a Belgian film director, screenwriter and animator. Du Chau lives and works in California and has directed a number of animated feature films including Quest for Camelot (1998) and the 2027 release Bollywoof. He has also directed two live-action films with animated visual effects: Racing Stripes (2005) and Underdog (2007). As of 2026 Frederic Du Chau was directing the animated feature film Bollywoof, a co-production between Sky and DNEG, due for release in 2027.

== Career ==
=== Early life ===
Du Chau attended the Academy of Fine Arts in his hometown of Ghent, where he studied film and majored in animation under Raoul Servais. After graduation, he worked for Walt Disney Animation France and later as a freelance animator and directed several local commercials, combining live-action and animation.

The selection of his student film, The Mystery of the Lamb (Het mysterie van het lam), for the Los Angeles Animation Celebration Conference brought him to Hollywood where he was offered a job as an animator and later as a visual development and storyboard artist for Disney, Warner Bros., and Universal.

=== Hollywood ===
Du Chau's break as a director came when Sony offered him to co-direct a short film with Hoyt Yeatman for Sony Wonder. This was followed with a stint as a storyboard artist for Chuck Jones where he learned everything he could about gags, timing and funny business from the master himself.

After a job as the animation director for Universal's The Land Before Time III: The Time of the Great Giving, Du Chau was then offered a position as a visual development artist at the newly formed Warner Bros. Feature Animation department, where he sold two screenplays. He was attached to one of them as a director and was soon offered to direct the first animated feature for Warner Bros. Quest for Camelot.

Du Chau wrote and sold a number of screenplays with Kirk DeMicco. One of the screenplays, titled Sky Boys, is a drama about two Irish immigrants who fight over the love of one girl while building the Empire State Building. Another screenplay was titled Hong Kong Phooey, based on the popular cartoon and was sold to Alcon and Warner Bros. This led to the opportunity to write and direct Racing Stripes for Warner Bros.

Racing Stripes grossed around $90 million worldwide, and this success led to the job of directing the American feature film titled, Underdog, for The Walt Disney Company, based on the popular 60s cartoon of a flying dog that becomes a superhero. It starred James Belushi, Jason Lee and Amy Adams.

Du Chau is currently attached to three different movies at several major studios. He just started filming The Krostons, based on the popular Belgian comic book series by Paul Deliege, his first Stereoscopic 3D movie for which he also wrote the screenplay.

When not directing Du Chau draws and develops his own series of graphic novels Fish Out of Water, and Ameluna. Du Chau's graphic novel work was selected at the Festival d'Angouleme 2008 to be exhibited as one of the Unpublished Young talents.

Du Chau lives and works in San Francisco, California.

As of 2026 Frederik Du Chau was directing the animated feature film "Bollywoof", a co-production between Sky and DNEG.

== Filmography ==
Year	Film	Director	Writer	Animator
1989	The Smoggies	No	No	Yes
1989	Het mysterie van het lam	Yes	No	No
1990–1991	TaleSpin	No	No	Yes
1992	Tom and Jerry: The Movie	No	No	Yes
1995	The Land Before Time 3	No	No	Yes
1998	Quest for Camelot	Yes	No	No
2005	Racing Stripes	Yes	Yes	No
2007	Underdog	Yes	No	No
2014	The Krostons	Yes	Yes	No
