= Jonathan Glickman =

American film producer (born 1969)

- Born: May 18, 1969 (age 57); Detroit, Michigan, US
- Education: University of Michigan
- Years active: 1995–present

Jonathan Glickman (born May 18, 1969) is an American film producer who served as the President of the MGM Motion Picture Group from 2011 to 2020 and has been the CEO of Miramax since April 2, 2024.

== Personal life and education ==
Glickman was born into a Jewish family and is the son of Rhoda Yura and Dan Glickman, the former Kansas Congressman, Secretary of Agriculture, and president of the MPAA. He was born in Detroit, Michigan and raised in Wichita, Kansas and Washington, D.C.

While he was a child, his mother introduced him to directors Martin Scorsese and Woody Allen. Glickman graduated from Georgetown Day School in Washington, D.C. in 1987, and from the University of Michigan in 1991. He worked briefly for HBO before enrolling in the University of Southern California's School of Cinematic Arts in 1992, although he quit in 1993.

== Career ==
Glickman began working in Hollywood when he convinced producer Joe Roth to give him an internship at Caravan Pictures after meeting him in an elevator at USC in 1993. By 1997, Glickman was president of production at Caravan. By 2002, he was president of production at Spyglass Entertainment. In 2003, he became president and partner at Spyglass.

Glickman was invited to join the Producers’ Branch of the Academy of Motion Picture Arts & Sciences in 2007.

Before he became a studio executive, Glickman's producer credits included While You Were Sleeping, Grosse Pointe Blank, Rush Hour and its two sequels, Shanghai Noon, Shanghai Knights, The Count of Monte Cristo, 27 Dresses, Four Christmases, The Tourist and The Vow.

On February 2, 2011, Glickman was named president of MGM's film division. His role at MGM will include the oversight of development and production for all feature films, as well as helping to identify co-financing opportunities with other studios. During Glickman's tenure, MGM has seen its key franchises reach new heights. He oversaw production on and released Skyfall and Spectre, the 23rd and 24th installments of the 007 franchise produced by Michael G. Wilson and Barbara Broccoli, which became the highest-grossing Bond films of all time earning a combined box office of over $2B worldwide. Glickman revived the Rocky franchise after its nine-year hiatus with Ryan Coogler’s critical and commercial smash Creed which earned Sylvester Stallone a Golden Globe win and Academy Award nomination. The updated franchise continued with in 2018 with Creed II directed by Steven Caple Jr., which set the record for highest-grossing live-action opener across Thanksgiving. In 2019, Glickman oversaw the production and release of The Addams Family, which is the highest non sequel animated film of the year, having already earned nearly $200M in worldwide box office.

Glickman has also overseen the revival of MGM as a domestic film distributor through its partnership with Annapurna Pictures in creating United Artists Releasing. In 2017, he oversaw the relaunch of Orion Pictures as a genre label. Additionally, he began overseeing MGM's live stage productions based on MGM properties in 2016.

On January 3, 2020, Glickman stepped down as president of MGM Motion Picture Group to transition into a producer role for the studio, although he continued overseeing No Time to Die, the 25th film in the Bond franchise. Glickman's eight year term as president of the studio was the longest since Dore Schary. During his term, 26.6% of the directors Glickman hired were female, far above the industry average.

Jonathan Glickman started a new company, Glickmania, in February 2020. Respect starring Jennifer Hudson is going to be the first movie produced by Glickmania. In 2021, Glickman founded the Panoramic Media Company, an incubator focusing on established and emerging storytellers across all platforms with key investors Spyglass Media Group, Eagle Pictures and United Talent Agency. In 2021, Glickman executive produced the hit Netflix series Wednesday, which earned Emmy Nomination and Golden Globe nominations for best comedy series.

In January 2024, Glickman was reported to be in talks with Miramax to join the company as its CEO following the departure of Bill Block in October 2023. If talks were successful, Glickman's Panoramic Media Company would be acquired by Miramax as well. On April 2, 2024, it was announced that Glickman would serve as CEO of Miramax effective immediately, with the company acquiring some projects from Panoramic Media Company as part of the deal.

== Philanthropy and honors ==
Glickman sits on the national board of the Posse Foundation as well as the National Archives Foundation.

Glickman was listed on The Hollywood Reporter 100 Most Powerful People in Entertainment 2019 as well as 2017 and 2019's Variety 500 list of the most influential people in the entertainment industry.

== Filmography ==
Film:

Producer

- Rush Hour (1998)
- Shanghai Noon (2000)
- Rush Hour 2 (2001)
- Out Cold (2001)
- The Count of Monte Cristo (2002)
- Shanghai Knights (2003)
- The Perfect Score (2004)
- Connie and Carla (2004)
- The Pacifier (2005)
- The Hitchhiker's Guide to the Galaxy (2005)
- The Invisible (2007)
- Rush Hour 3 (2007)
- Underdog (2007)
- 27 Dresses (2008)
- Four Christmases (2008)
- Leap Year (2010)
- The Tourist (2010)
- The Vow (2012)
- Respect (2021)
- Creed III (2023)

Associate producer

- The Jerky Boys: The Movie (1995)
- While You Were Sleeping (1995)
- Before and After (1996)

Executive producer

- Celtic Pride (1996)
- Grosse Pointe Blank (1997)
- RocketMan (1997)
- Holy Man (1998)
- Keeping the Faith (2000)
- Reign of Fire (2002)
- The Recruit (2003)
- Mr. 3000 (2004)
- Stay Alive (2006)
- Stick It (2006)
- The Lookout (2007)
- Balls of Fury (2007)
- Flash of Genius (2008)
- No Strings Attached (2011)
- Footloose (2011)
- The Addams Family 2 (2021)
- Roofman (2025)
- Scary Movie (2026)

Television:

Executive producer:

- Wednesday (2022)
- Zero Day (2025)

Ref.:
