= Shanghai Noon =

2000 film by Tom Dey

- Theatrical release poster
- Directed by: Tom Dey
- Written by: Alfred Gough; Miles Millar
- Produced by: Roger Birnbaum; Gary Barber; Jonathan Glickman
- Starring: Jackie Chan; Owen Wilson; Lucy Liu
- Cinematography: Dan Mindel
- Edited by: Richard Chew
- Music by: Randy Edelman
- Production companies: Touchstone Pictures; Spyglass Entertainment; Birnbaum/Barber Productions; Jackie Chan Films
- Distributed by: Buena Vista Pictures Distribution
- Release dates: May 26, 2000 (United States); June 1, 2000 (Hong Kong)
- Running time: 110 minutes
- Countries: United States; Hong Kong
- Language: English
- Budget: $55 million
- Box office: $99.3 million

Shanghai Noon is a 2000 martial arts western action comedy film directed by Tom Dey in his feature film debut, written by Alfred Gough and Miles Millar, and starring Jackie Chan, Owen Wilson and Lucy Liu. It is the first entry in the Shanghai film series.

The film, set in Nevada and other parts of the American West in the 19th century, is a juxtaposition of a Western with a kung fu action film with extended martial arts sequences, as reflected by its title, which is a wordplay on the notable western High Noon. It also has elements of slapstick comedy and the "buddy film" genre, featuring two vastly different heroes (a Chinese Imperial Guard and an American Western outlaw) who team up to stop a crime.

The film premiered in Malaysia in May 19, 2000 and was released in the United States on May 26, 2000. It received generally positive reviews from critics. A sequel, Shanghai Knights, was released in 2003, with Chan and Wilson reprising their roles.

== Plot ==
In 1881, Chon Wang – a homophone for John Wayne – is a Chinese Imperial Guard in the Forbidden City. After Princess Pei-Pei, aided by her foreign tutor, runs away to the United States, the Emperor of China sends three of his guards and the Royal Interpreter to retrieve her. Having failed to stop her escape, Wang insists on joining the mission. The Royal Interpreter, Wang's uncle, allows him to accompany the party, and the Captain of the Imperial Guards hopes the "foreign devils" will get rid of Wang. The party arrives in Nevada, where outlaw Roy O'Bannon and his gang hijack their train. Wallace, a new member of Roy's gang, kills Wang's uncle, and Wang, a skilled martial artist, fights off the gang before uncoupling the train cars and escaping on the engine. Wallace takes over the gang, leaving Roy buried up to his chin in the desert. Meanwhile, Pei-Pei, tricked into believing she was freely escaping her arranged marriage in China, learns she has been kidnapped by an agent of Lo Fong, a rebel who fled the Forbidden City. Fong later kills his agent after he demands an increased pay from him.

Wang finds Roy and demands to know the direction to Carson City. Roy tells him the city is on the other side of a mountain, and Wang leaves two chopsticks in Roy's mouth to dig himself out. Reaching the other side of the mountain, Wang saves a Sioux boy from the Crow tribe and half-consciously marries the Sioux chief's daughter, Falling Leaves, (Note: Merrill's character is never referred to by name in the film, and is listed in the credits as "Indian Wife". However, the film's script identifies her as "Falling Leaves".) during the wild celebrations. Wang finds a small town and encounters Roy in a tavern, inciting a barroom brawl. The two are sent to jail, and share each other's stories. Tempted by mention of the gold ransom, Roy offers to help Wang find the princess. After Falling Leaves helps them escape, Roy trains Wang in the ways of the cowboy, assisted by Falling Leaves.

In Carson City, Roy discovers that both he and Wang are wanted by Lo Fong's ally Marshal Nathan Van Cleef, narrowly escaping capture. They reach Roy's "hideout" (a bordello), and bond with each other while recuperating there. They are arrested by Van Cleef after a drunken encounter with Wang, and discover that Lo Fong is behind the princess' abduction. As they are about to be hanged, Wang frees himself, Falling Leaves shoots Roy loose, and they escape. Wang, upset at overhearing Roy tell a prostitute he is not Wang's friend, rides off alone. He finds Pei-Pei in Lo Fong's labor camp, but she wishes to stay and help the enslaved Chinese laborers. Lo Fong discovers Wang and attacks him, but Roy appears, saving Wang and the two reconcile.

The next day, the Imperial Guards bring gold to the Carson City Mission church to ransom Pei-Pei from Lo Fong, but the exchange is complicated by the appearance of Wang and Roy. Wang tells his fellow guards he will not allow them to take the princess against her wishes. As the guards and Lo Fong fight, Van Cleef arrives and engages Roy in a gunfight. Roy survives unscathed, and shoots Van Cleef through his sheriff's star, killing him. Wang fights the Imperial Guards as Lo Fong chases Pei-Pei through the rafters of the church, but Wang convinces his guards to let him go to Pei-Pei's aid instead. Wang and Lo Fong reach the bell tower, and Pei-Pei is wounded. Wang dismantles the bell, causing the ropes to strangle Lo Fong to death. The Imperial Guards agree to let Pei-Pei remain in Nevada, and reward Wang and Roy with the ransom gold.

Wallace and his gang arrive at the church, and demand that Roy and Wang come out and fight, but find themselves surrounded by the Sioux. At a Chinese cultural celebration, Roy shares a passionate kiss with Falling Leaves while Pei-Pei embraces Wang. Wang and Roy, who reveals his real name to be Wyatt Earp, become sheriffs and ride off after a new band of train robbers.

== Cast ==
- Jackie Chan as Chon Wang
- Owen Wilson as Roy O'Bannon
- Lucy Liu as Princess Pei-Pei
- Roger Yuan as Lo Fong
- Walton Goggins as Wallace
- Xander Berkeley as Marshal Nathan Van Cleef
- Jason Connery as Calvin Andrews the agent of Lo Fong
- Brandon Merrill as Indian Wife / Falling Leaves
- Rafael Baez as Vasquez
- P. Adrien Dorval as Blue
- Yu Rongguang as Captain Yu of the Imperial Guards
- Kate Luyben as Fifi
- Russell Badger as Sioux Chief
- Sam Simon as Chief's Sidekick
- Simon R. Baker as Little Feather
- Henry O as the Royal Interpreter
- Tseng Chang as Pei-Pei's Father
- Yuen Biao as Saloon Fighter (uncredited)

== Production ==
In August 1998, it was announced Spyglass Entertainment had begun development on an untitled feature set to star Jackie Chan written by Alfred Gough and Miles Millar. In January 1999 following the success of Rush Hour, Spyglass formally greenlit the film under its new title of Shanghai Noon. The following month, Owen Wilson was cast as the co-lead opposite Chan with Tom Dey set to direct. In April of that year, Lucy Liu was cast as the princess whom Chan's character tries to rescue.

Principal photography began on May 25, 1999 and completed on August 20. Filming took place in the Canadian Badlands, near Drumheller, Alberta, Canada, near Exshaw, Alberta, and also near Cochrane, Alberta. The opening sequence was shot on-location at the Forbidden City in Beijing.

Curtis Armstrong had a role in the film, playing Bulldog Drummond, but these scenes were deleted.

== Reception ==
=== Box office ===
Produced at a budget of $55 million, the film grossed $99,274,467 worldwide. The film opened in third place at the US box office grossing $19.6 million in its opening weekend behind Dinosaur and Mission: Impossible 2 and went on to gross $56.9 million. It opened at number one in Hong Kong with an opening week gross of $1.2 million.

=== Critical response ===
On the review aggregator website Rotten Tomatoes, 80% of 130 critics' reviews are positive. The website's consensus reads: "Although the plot is really nothing to brag about, Jackie Chan and Owen Wilson work well together. The cinematography looks great, and Jackie delivers a hilarious performance. This is an old-fashioned crowd-pleaser." Metacritic, which uses a weighted average, assigned the film a score of 77 out of 100, based on 30 critics, indicating "generally favorable" reviews. Audiences polled by CinemaScore gave the film an average grade of "A−" on an A+-to-F scale.

Joe Leydon of Variety gave Shanghai Noon a favorable review, characterizing it as "Fast, furious and, quite often, very, very funny." Roger Ebert of the Chicago Sun-Times gave the film 3 out of 4 stars, writing: "If you see only one martial arts Western this year (and there is probably an excellent chance of that), this is the one."

== Sequel ==
A sequel, Shanghai Knights, was released on February 7, 2003. Chan and Wilson reprised their roles, while David Dobkin replaced Tom Dey as director.

== See also ==
- The Fighting Fist of Shanghai Joe
- Red Sun
- The Stranger and the Gunfighter
- Jackie Chan filmography
- List of martial arts films
