= Kim Chan =

Chinese actor (1917– 2008)

- Born: Chan Kim Shung; December 28, 1917; Shanghai, Republic of China
- Died: October 5, 2008 (aged 90); New York City, United States
- Other name: Kim S. Chan
- Years active: 1951–2007

Chinese name
- Chinese: 陈锦湘
Transcriptions
Standard Mandarin
- Hanyu Pinyin: Chén Jǐnxiāng
Yue: Cantonese
- Jyutping: can4 gam2 soeng1
other Yue
- Taishanese: cin3 gim3 lhiang1

Kim Chan (born Kim Shung Chan; Chinese: 陈锦湘; December 28, 1917 – October 5, 2008) was a Chinese and American actor and producer. He was most notable for his roles as Lo Si, also known as The Ancient, in Kung Fu: The Legend Continues and Mr. Kim in The Fifth Element.

== Early life and education ==
Kim Shung Chan was born in Shanghai, to a family originally from Taishan, Guangdong. Together with his father and two sisters, Chan immigrated to the United States in 1928, first living in Rhode Island, before settling in the Bronx in New York City in 1938. Chan worked as a maître d'hôtel at the House of Chan family restaurant in Manhattan. Having held a life-long fascination with the film industry, he left this position in the 1940s to pursue an acting career, which led to his father cutting off ties with him. Although Chan was happy with the higher wages for work as an extra, he had frequent financial difficulties and was homeless for two years, often living in Central Park. He primarily worked menial jobs in construction, restaurants and laundries, during this time.

== Career ==
Chan was a familiar character actor, especially when he was elderly. An early role that brought him notice was in the Martin Scorsese film The King of Comedy with Robert De Niro and Jerry Lewis, in which he played Lewis' butler.

He played the character Lo Si, also known as The Ancient, in 52 episodes of Kung Fu: The Legend Continues, from 1993 through 1997. He also played the villainous monk Ping Hai on the TV series. The series was a revised version of the original 1973 classic Kung Fu, with both series starring David Carradine. He played the recurring villain The Eggman in four episodes of the science fiction TV series Now and Again. He appeared in many guest roles in series, including: Mad About You (1998), Law & Order: Criminal Intent (2002) and Law & Order: Special Victims Unit (2004).

Other film roles include: uncle Benny Chan in Lethal Weapon 4 (1998), the father of Chon Wang (Jackie Chan) in Shanghai Knights (2003), Mr. Kim in The Fifth Element (1997), Fuji in Who's the Man? (1993), Benny Wong in The Corruptor (1999), The Master in Zen Noir (2004), and a cameo appearance as a waiter in Private Parts (1997). He was also a producer on Zen Noir.

Chan retired from acting in 2007, subsequently moving from his long-time residence in the Bronx to an assisted living facility in Brooklyn.

== Personal life ==
Chan never married, but had romantic relationships with non-Chinese women. He had no biological children, but had an adoptive son, Michael Chandler.

== Death ==
Chan died on October 5, 2008, after being hospitalized for respiratory disease. His age at death is most commonly reported as 90, although he had reportedly told Linda Wang that he was 93, shortly before he died. His niece, Judy Gee, also claimed that he was likely 93 or 94 years old.

He was featured in a photography exhibit when he was in his 90s. In October 2009, a year after his death, Chan appeared on the cover of the journal The Gerontologist beside his photography portrait.

== Honors and awards ==
In November 1999, the Screen Actors Guild presented Chan with an award for lifetime achievement. He received another award for lifetime achievement in August 2004, at the Rhode Island International Film Festival.

== Filmography ==
=== Film ===
Kim Chan film credits
Year	Title	Role	Notes
1957	A Face in the Crowd	Commercial Spokesperson	No Dialogue / Uncredited
1970	The Owl and the Pussycat	Theatre Cashier	
1979	Squadra antigangsters	Chan Chu Kai	Uncredited
1982	Soup for One	Harold The Cook	
1983	The King of Comedy	Jonno	
1984	Over the Brooklyn Bridge	Japanese Buyer #2	
1984	Moscow on the Hudson	Chinese Customer	
1984	The Cotton Club	Ling	
1985	Desperately Seeking Susan	Park Bum	
1985	Streetwalkin'	Desk Clerk	
1986	9½ Weeks	Chinatown Butcher	
1986	Gung Ho	Member of Board	
1986	Jumpin' Jack Flash	Korean Flower Vendor	
1986	No Mercy	Old Asian Man	
1987	Fatal Attraction	Party Guest	Uncredited
1989	Cookie	Hong Kong Tailor	
1989	Second Sight	Chinese Store Owner	
1990	Cadillac Man	Dim Sum Cook	
1990	Alice	Dr. Yang's Patient	
1991	Thousand Pieces of Gold	Li Ping	
1991	American Shaolin	Master Kwan	
1993	Who's the Man?	Fuji	
1994	Robot in the Family	Massage Parlor Patron #1	
1996	Breathing Room	Meditation Teacher	
1997	Private Parts	Waiter	
1997	The Fifth Element	Mr. Kim	
1997	The Devil's Advocate	Chinese Man	
1997	Kundun	Second Chinese General	
1998	Lethal Weapon 4	Benny 'Uncle Benny' Chan	
1999	A Fish in the Bathtub	Medicine Shop Owner	
1999	The Corruptor	Benny 'Uncle Benny' Wong	
1999	On the Q.T.	Asian Busker	
2002	High Times' Potluck	Saki	
2002	Rollerball		Uncredited
2003	Shanghai Knights	Chon Wang's Father	
2004	Zen Noir	The Master	
2005	The Honeymooners	Quinn	
2006	16 Blocks	Sam	

=== Television ===
Kim Chan television credits
Year	Title	Role	Notes
1985	The Equalizer	Man Sitting on Steps (uncredited)	Episode: "China Rain"
1986	Outlaws	Mr. Luk	
1990	Law & Order	Juror (uncredited)	Episode: "Indifference"
1991	Law & Order	Restaurant Manager	Episode: "Heaven"
1993–1997	Kung Fu: The Legend Continues	Lo Si (The Ancient) / Ping Hai	54 episodes
1999–2000	Now and Again	The Eggman	4 episodes
2002	Law & Order: Criminal Intent	Mr. Hsu	Episode: "Chinoiserie"
2004	Law & Order: Special Victims Unit	Mr. Zhang	Episode: "Debt"
