= Shanghai Knights =

2003 film by David Dobkin

- Theatrical release poster
- Directed by: David Dobkin
- Screenplay by: Alfred Gough; Miles Millar
- Based on: Characters by Alfred Gough; Miles Millar
- Produced by: Roger Birnbaum; Gary Barber; Jonathan Glickman
- Starring: Jackie Chan; Owen Wilson; Donnie Yen; Aidan Gillen
- Cinematography: Adrian Biddle
- Edited by: Malcolm Campbell
- Music by: Randy Edelman
- Production companies: Touchstone Pictures; Spyglass Entertainment; Birnbaum / Barber Productions; Jackie Chan Films
- Distributed by: Buena Vista Pictures Distribution
- Release dates: February 7, 2003 (United States); April 4, 2003 (United Kingdom); April 10, 2003 (Czech Republic)
- Running time: 114 minutes
- Countries: United States; United Kingdom; Czech Republic
- Language: English
- Budget: $50 million
- Box office: $88.3 million

Shanghai Knights is a 2003 martial arts western action comedy film. It is the sequel to Shanghai Noon, and the second installment of the Shanghai film series. Directed by David Dobkin and written by Alfred Gough and Miles Millar, it stars Jackie Chan, Owen Wilson, Fann Wong, Donnie Yen and Aidan Gillen.

It was released in the United States on February 7, 2003. The film received mixed reviews, but it performed well at the box office.

== Plot ==
In 1887, Lord Nelson Rathbone leads a band of Boxers into the Forbidden City, stealing the Imperial Seal of China and mortally wounds its Keeper. Before dying, the Keeper gives his daughter Chon Lin a puzzle box for her brother, Chon Wang. In Carson City, Nevada, Wang is now sheriff. He receives the box and a letter from Lin, telling him of their father's death and that she has tracked his killer to London.

Wang travels to New York City to find his old partner Roy O'Bannon and collect his share of their gold so that he can buy passage to London. Roy has left law enforcement, invested all the gold, and is now a waiter and gigolo. Following a series of misunderstandings, the pair ship themselves to London in a crate.

In London, Roy's pocket is picked by a youth named Charlie, leading to a massive brawl; Roy and Wang are arrested. In Scotland Yard, the two quickly befriend Inspector Artie Doyle and are released. Artie shows them that Lin is in custody for attempting to kill Rathbone. Roy is instantly smitten with Lin. Wang and Roy reunite with Charlie and acquire an invitation to a gala at Rathbone's country estate.

Roy and Wang infiltrate the gala in disguise, and follow Rathbone to a private library, where he slips through a secret passage. Lin, having escaped prison, arrives and saves Roy from Boxer guards. The three see Rathbone give the Imperial Seal to Wu Chow, the illegitimate brother of the Emperor of China. After a brief struggle, Charlie steals the seal. Everyone escapes and Wang, Roy and Lin make their way to Whitechapel.

At a brothel, Roy is devastated when he overhears Wang try to convince Lin that Roy is an unsuitable husband. Wang, Roy, and Lin are found and captured by Rathbone, who reveals his plan: In exchange for the seal, Wu Chow will kill the British royal family with a prototype machine gun and frame Lin. Rathbone, tenth in line for the throne, will become king. Roy and Wang reconcile and manage to escape.

Wang and Roy consult Artie about Charlie's location. Artie deduces that Charlie is at Madame Tussauds. They save him from the Boxers, but are forced to hand over the seal in exchange for Charlie's life. Roy and Wang are arrested, but Charlie rescues them and reveals that his full name is Charlie Chaplin. Roy and Wang free Lin and stop the assassination, killing Wu Chow with fireworks. The three pursue Rathbone to the top of Big Ben. Wang is able to throw Rathbone through the face of the clock, killing him.

Roy, Wang, and Artie are knighted for saving the royal family. Artie decides to become a writer and creates the character Sherlock Holmes based on the disguise Roy wore at the gala. Wang opens the box his father sent him to find a message reminding him of the importance of family. Roy proposes that he and Wang go to Hollywood to join the new motion picture industry. Charlie stows away in their carriage as they drive off.

== Cast ==
- Jackie Chan as Chon Wang
- Owen Wilson as Roy O'Bannon
- Donnie Yen as Wu Chow
- Aidan Gillen as Lord Nelson Rathbone
- Fann Wong as Chon Lin
- Tom Fisher as Arthur "Artie" Doyle
- Kim Chan as Chon Wang and Chon Lin's Father
- Gemma Jones as Queen Victoria
- Aaron Johnson as Charlie Chaplin
- Oliver Cotton as Jack the Ripper
- Tom Wu as "Lead Boxer" Liu
- Kelly-Marie Kerr as Clara
- Constantine Gregory as the Mayor of New York City
- Ray Donn as Chinese villager (uncredited)
- Barbara Nedeljáková as Debutante
- Anna-Louise Plowman as Debutante
- Georgina Chapman as Debutante
- Daisy Beaumont as Cigarette girl
- Alison King as Prostitute
- Matt Hill as Deputy
- Barry Stanton as Lord Chancellor

=== Jackie Chan Stunt Team ===
- Brad Allan as Street thug / Library thug (uncredited)
- Paul Andreovski as Library thug with sword (double) / English policeman (uncredited)
- Nicky Li
- He Jun
- Wu Gang
- Park Hyun Jin
- Lee In Seob
- Han Guan Hua
- Peter Edward Dutton
- John Hillman

== Production ==
Director David Dobkin was personally chosen by Jackie Chan. Dobkin had a difficult time choosing a suitable Asian actress who could do movement work, emote well and speak excellent English. He then saw clips of Fann Wong's videos "Wo lai ye" (2001) and "Qing she yu bai she" (2001) and asked to audition her in London, which she did. She got the role and the number of scenes with her in was increased by thirty percent. According to Jackie Chan's memoir Never Grow Up, Faye Wong from his native city Hong Kong was his first choice, but Fann Wong was incorrectly hired instead.

Aside from establishing shots of iconic English landmarks, including The Houses of Parliament, Buckingham Palace and Madame Tussaud's, the scenes in London were largely filmed in Prague, Czech Republic from February 4 to June 21, 2002.

== Reception ==
=== Critical response ===
Shanghai Knights received mixed reviews from critics, with praise for the chemistry between Chan and Wilson, the action sequences, and the fun nature of the film, but strong criticism for the plot.

On review aggregator website Rotten Tomatoes, the film has an approval rating of 66% based on 149 reviews, with an average rating of 5.9/10. The site's consensus states: "A silly, anachronistic mess, but the pairing of Chan and Wilson makes the movie fun."

On Metacritic, the film has a score of 58 out of 100, based on reviews from 33 critics. Audiences surveyed by CinemaScore gave the film a grade "B+" on scale of A to F.

Roger Ebert of the Chicago Sun Times gave the film three out of four stars, calling it "fun in a broad, genial way", but disapproved of the "entirely arbitrary" plot. Joe Leydon of Variety found it better than its predecessor: "A hugely entertaining and more lavishly mounted follow-up to 2000's Shanghai Noon, the high-concept East-meets-Western – that first teamed [the] top-billed duo – pic rides even taller in the saddle as a fleet and funny crowd-pleaser." Elvis Mitchell of The New York Times gave a positive review, singling out Chan's fight sequences and Wilson's performance, noting how "Wilson gets to steal a part of the movie that Chan is smart enough not to want." Mitchell also praised the "bluntly gorgeous" cinematography, and said Chan's reputation is "resuscitated in the rousing, cheerful sequel", calling it "one of his best." Nathan Rabin of The A.V. Club also praised the chemistry between the two leads, writing, "Chan [...] found the perfect screen buddy in Wilson." Rabin criticized the "thin" plot, but found "there's a greatest-hits element" to Chan's fight scenes.

== Planned sequel ==
MGM announced in May 2015 that they were moving forward with Shanghai Dawn. Jackie Chan, Owen Wilson, and Fann Wong are expected to reprise their roles as Chon Wang, Roy O'Bannon, and Chon Lin respectively. In September 2016, Jared Hess signed on as director for the film, while both Millar and Gough would develop a screen story with Theodore Riley and Aaron Buchsbaum writing the script for the film.

Gough said the third film will be set in China because Chan "wants to showcase China in the way that the first film showcased the old West". Gough added that Chan and Wilson also have a hand in the creative process: "With those films, the collaboration of Jackie and Owen comes out on screen as they get along very well. With that in mind, you want to get their input in the story phase, so that when we got to script, it's based into the DNA of the story."

In 2024, Gough later revealed that the sequel will most likely never happen as Chan seemed to lose interest in producing it. He further revealed that the plot would have picked up from where the last film left off with Chon Wang now a Hollywood stunt man. He would receive news that Roy O'Bannon was in Mexico with revolutionaries and would team back up with him. Despite this, in 2025, Chan claimed that the script was still being worked on. However, there's no further progress information about the film's development as of 2026.
