= Tom Dey =

American film director

- Born: Thomas Ridgeway Dey; April 14, 1965 (age 60); Hanover, New Hampshire, U.S.
- Education: Brown University (BA); American Film Institute (MFA)
- Occupations: Film director; screenwriter; producer

Thomas Ridgeway Dey (born April 14, 1965) is an American film director, screenwriter, and producer. His credits include Shanghai Noon (2000), Showtime (2002), Failure to Launch (2006), and Marmaduke (2010).

== Early life ==
Dey was born in Hanover, New Hampshire, the son of Phoebe Ann (née Evans) and Charles Frederick Dey, who was Associate Dean at Dartmouth College from 1963 to 1973 and headmaster of Choate Rosemary Hall.

Dey is a graduate of Choate Rosemary Hall, Brown University, and the American Film Institute. He got his start by shooting a spec commercial reel which landed him the roster at Ridley Scott Associates. Dey stayed at RSA for eighteen years before moving to Native Pictures.

== Filmography ==
Film

- Shanghai Noon (2000)
- Showtime (2002)
- Failure to Launch (2006)
- Marmaduke (2010)
- Wedding Season (2022)

Television

- The Hunger (1997) (Episode 21)
- Snatch (2018) (3 episodes)
