= Angels in the Outfield (franchise) =

- Official franchise logo, as released in 1996.
- Based on: Original story by David Mickey Evans; Richard Conlin
- Starring: Various (See list below)
- Distributed by: Metro-Goldwyn-Mayer; Buena Vista Pictures
- Country: United States
- Budget: $32,081,000 (2 films)
- Box office: $19,821,831 (2 films) (Note: These figures are based on the available numbers for the theatrical films. Though there are a total four feature-length movies, there is no financial information publicly available for the made-for-television installments.)

The Angels in the Outfield franchise consists of American comedy-sports films, centered around the premise and original story written by Richard Conlin. The series of films include the 1951 original film, a 1994 remake and its two made-for-television sequels which were subsequently released straight-to-home video. Each installment depicts the fictional events of struggling sports teams, who receive help from heavenly messengers, and ultimately overcome their pitfalls. The sporting events depicted in the films, include Major League Baseball and High School Football. The plot depicts the development of character and spiritual growth, that comes with the help of angels.

The critical response for the original film, and its remake received mixed-to-positive and a less-than-positive response from critics, respectively. The latter's following two sequels, were met with poor critical reception. Despite this, the 1951 release is regarded as a classic film, while Angels in the Outfield (1994) has subsequently gained a cult childhood classic status, and is ranked No. 9 on The Wrap's list of the twenty highest-grossing movies based on baseball.

== Films ==
Film	U.S. release date	Director	Screenwriter(s)	Story by	Producer(s)
Angels in the Outfield	October 19, 1951	Clarence Brown	Dorothy Kingsley & George Wells	Richard Conlin	Clarence Brown
Angels in the Outfield	July 15, 1994	William Dear	Holly Goldberg Sloan	Holly Goldberg Sloan	Irby Smith, Joe Roth and Roger Birnbaum
Angels in the Endzone	November 9, 1997	Gary Nadeau	Alan Eisenstock & Larry Mintz	Alan Eisenstock & Larry Mintz	Richard L. O'Connor
Angels in the Infield	April 9, 2000	Robert King	Robert King & Garrett K. Shiff	Holly Goldberg Sloan & Robert King	Fitch Cady

=== Angels in the Outfield (1951) ===
A newspaper reporter name Jennifer Paige investigates the MLB Pittsburgh Pirates' losing streak. The progress of the team is at a stand still, led by field manager "Guffy" McGovern, whose swearing and fighting further hinder their potential. An orphan named Bridget White has been praying for the team in the meantime. Her pleas are answered, when the voice of an angel urges McGovern to be kinder. In doing so, the angelic voice promises to help the Pirates finally win. During the playoffs the manager's temper is further tested, but McGovern seeks to help his team by keeping his promise with the heavenly messenger.

=== Angels in the Outfield (1994) ===
A foster-kid Roger Bomman loves the MLB California Angels, though they continue to be the worst team in the league. His estranged birth-father flippantly promises to reunite the family if the Angels make it to the World Series, with no intention of doing so. Roger resolves to ask God for some divine help, and prays that the team can turn things around. Soon thereafter, an angel from heaven named Al descends in response to the boy's plea and agrees to help the team so that the Roger can regain a family. California's hopeless coach, George Knox, is surprised when he sees he's team on achieve victory. Knox is not amused when Roger tells him the truth, that messengers from heaven are assist the team. When the team miraculously reaches the finals of the World Series, Knox begins to believe in the heavenly aid. Roger's father never returns to retrieve him. With Knox's job on the line, the urgency of the matter intensifies when the team struggles in the early innings of the final game. Together they learn that the spirits cannot and will not help the team in the last game of the Series, and hope for the team to rise above its follies.

=== Angels in the Endzone (1997) ===
The Westfield High School Angels football team have yet to win a game, in the last decade. Jesse Harper the team's halfback is a rising star, and gives the team hope in the upcoming season. This changes when after a severe rainstorm, Jesse's father dies in a motor vehicle accident. Saddened by these events, Jesse quits the team. Realizing that football gave Jesse purpose and motivation, his younger brother Kevin prays for help. Al the Angel returns to again to help the family with their loss, specifically focusing on Jesse. The angel assists the team in ending their losing streak, and seeks to change the lives of these brothers who suffer and struggle at the loss of their father.

=== Angels in the Infield (2000) ===
A past their prime MLB Anaheim Angels Pitcher named Eddie "Steady" Everett, makes a mistake when pitching to Randy Fleck in the crucial game of a series against the Boston Red Sox. Following these events, he threw away both his career and his personal life. In the process, he loses his family. Though his wife divorces him, his young daughter named Laurel still believes in him. After asking in prayer that God's help find her father, her personal guardian angel named Bob descends from heaven to help the family. Bob "Bungler" Bugler, a former MLB Pitcher himself, seeks to restore the confidence in Everett, help him recover from his career slump, assist the Anaheim Angels in regaining their winnings, and solve Laurel's struggles in ballet. After helping Eddie retain his position right as he was about to be cut from the roster, the team proceeds to attain an incredible winning streak. As the season ends, the Anaheim Angels are forced to play a single-elimination tournament in a postseason game against their rivals: the Arizona Crimson Devils. Though the heavenly messengers cannot and will not help the baseball team win the final game, the devil strikes a deal with the Crimson Devil's rising star, Randy Fleck. When the game is delayed due to rain Everett, who has come to value his relationship with his family, leaves to attend Laurel's ballet performance. Upon returning to the game, Everett finds that his team is losing 2–0. Knowing that the angelic team won't be assisting Anaheim's ball game, Everett feels lost and asks God what is to be done. On the Pitcher's mound, Bob whispers into his ear that Everett's angel is with him just as his ex-wife arrives to the game to support him. He realizes his family is most important, and finds strength within to continue the game.

== Main cast and characters ==
List indicators

This section includes characters who will appear or have appeared in the franchise in main roles.

- An empty grey cell indicates the character was not in the film, or that the character's official presence has not yet been confirmed.
- ^{V} indicates a voice-only role.

Character	Film			
Character	Angels in the Outfield (1951)	Angels in the Outfield (1994)	Angels in the Endzone	Angels in the Infield
Principal cast
Archangel Gabriel	James Whitmore^{V}			
Aloysius X. "Guffy" McGovern Pitsburg Pirates Manager	Paul Douglas			
Jennifer Paige-McGovern	Janet Leigh			
Bridget White-McGovern	Donna Corcoran			
Al "The Boss Angel"		Christopher Lloyd	Christopher Lloyd	
George Knox California Angels Manager		Danny Glover		
Roger Bomman-Knox		Joseph Gordon-Levitt		
J.P. Knox		Milton Davis, Jr.		
Maggie Nelson		Brenda Fricker		
Jesse Harper Westfield High School Angels Halfback			Matthew Lawrence	
Kevin Harper			David Gallagher	
Peter Harper			Jack Coleman	
Grace Harper			Lynda Boyd	
Bob "Bungler" Bugler				David Alan Grier
Eddie "Steady" Everett Anaheim Angels Pitcher				Patrick Warburton
Laurel Everett				Brittney Irvin
Claire Everett				Rebecca Jenkins
Supporting cast
Mel Clark California Angels Pitcher		Tony Danza		
Whitt Bass California Angels Pitcher		Neal McDonough		
Frank Gates California Angels Pitcher		Robert Clohessy		
Abascal California Angels First baseman		Mitchell Page		
José Martínez California Angels Second baseman		Israel Juarbe		
Ray Mitchell California Angels Third baseman		Stoney Jackson		
Triscuitt Messmer California Angels Catcher		Tony Longo		
Pablo García California Angels Shortstop		Albert García		
Danny Hemmerling California Angels Teammate		Adrien Brody		
Ben Williams California Angels Center fielder		Matthew McConaughey		
Randy Fleck Arizona Crimson Devils Player				Duane Davis
The Devil				Colin Fox

== Additional crew and production details ==
Film	Crew/Detail					
Film	Composer	Cinematographer	Editor	Production companies	Distributing companies	Running time
Angels in the Outfield (1951)	Daniele Amfitheatrof	Paul C. Vogel	Robert J. Kern	Metro-Goldwyn-Mayer, Loew's Incorporated	Metro-Goldwyn-Mayer	1hr 39mins
Angels in the Outfield (1994)	Randy Edelman	Matthew F. Leonetti	Bruce Green	Walt Disney Pictures, Caravan Pictures	Buena Vista Pictures	1hr 42mins
Angels in the Endzone	Frédéric Talgorn	Ron Orieux	Jeff Freeman	Walt Disney Television, Arts & Leisure Corporation, Endzone Productions	Buena Vista Television, American Broadcasting Company	1hr 30mins
Angels in the Infield	Ira Newborn	James Gardner	Corky Ehlers	Walt Disney Television, Roger Birnbaum Productions	Buena Vista Television, American Broadcasting Company	1hr 29mins

== Reception ==
=== Box office and financial performance ===
Film	Box office gross			Box office ranking		Budget	Worldwide Net income	Ref.
Film	North America	Other territories	Worldwide	All time North America	All time worldwide	Budget	Worldwide Net income	Ref.
Angels in the Outfield (1951)	information unavailable	—N/a	$1,666,000	information unavailable	information unavailable	$1,081,000	$585,000	
Angels in the Outfield (1994)	$50,236,831	—N/a	$50,236,831	#1,734	#2,755	$31,000,000	$19,236,831	
Angels in the Endzone	—N/a	—N/a	—N/a	—N/a	—N/a	information unavailable	—N/a	
Angels in the Infield	—N/a	—N/a	—N/a	—N/a	—N/a	information unavailable	—N/a	

=== Critical response ===
Film	Rotten Tomatoes	Metacritic
Angels in the Outfield (1951)	—N/a	—N/a
Angels in the Outfield (1994)	33% (21 reviews)	44 (24 reviews)
Angels in the Endzone	—N/a	—N/a
Angels in the Infield	—N/a	—N/a
