= Foley Square (TV series) =

- Genre: Sitcom
- Created by: Diane English
- Starring: Margaret Colin; Héctor Elizondo; Vernee Watson-Johnson; Michael Lembeck; Cathy Silvers; Sanford Jensen; Israel Juarbe; Jon Lovitz; Richard C. Sarafian
- Theme music composer: Gordon Lustig
- Country of origin: United States
- Original language: English
- No. of seasons: 1
- No. of episodes: 14

Production
- Executive producers: Saul Turteltaub; Bernie Orenstein
- Producer: Diane English
- Running time: 30 minutes
- Production companies: Shukovsky English Entertainment; CBS Productions

Original release
- Network: CBS
- Release: December 11, 1985 – April 8, 1986

Foley Square is an American sitcom starring Margaret Colin which centers on an assistant district attorney in New York City. Original episodes aired from December 11, 1985, until April 8, 1986.

== Cast ==
- Margaret Colin as Alex Harrigan
- Héctor Elizondo as Jesse Steinberg
- Vernee Watson-Johnson as Denise Willums
- Michael Lembeck as Peter Newman
- Cathy Silvers as Molly Dobbs
- Sanford Jensen as Carter DeVries
- Israel Juarbe as Angel Gomez
- Jon Lovitz as Mole
- Richard C. Sarafian as Spiro Papadopolis

== Synopsis ==
Clockwise from top: Cast members Michael Lembeck, Margaret Colin, and Héctor Elizondo in a promotional photograph for Foley Square.

Alex Harrigan is a perky, dedicated, unmarried assistant district attorney who works in a District Attorney's office located in New York City on Foley Square in Manhattan. Her boss, District Attorney Jesse Steinberg, is a veteran prosecutor who has seen it all and who she feels overlooks her when assigning the office's important cases to its staff of prosecutors. She also works with Assistant District Attorney Carter DeVries, who is overbearing and ambitious, and young Assistant District Attorney Molly Dobbs, who has just graduated from law school. Alex's secretary is Denise Willums, and the office's messenger is Angel Gomez, a young ex-convict. Mole is the office's investigator. When on break and after work, the co-workers gather across the street from the office at a coffee shop owned and operated by Spiro Papadopolis.

Alex lives in an apartment building on Manhattan's Upper West Side. Peter Newman, a schoolteacher, is her neighbor in the building and a good friend. Alex's social life is prone to ups and downs.

== Production ==
Creator and producer Diane English intended Foley Square and its scripts to reflect what she considered to be the "women's viewpoint."

Cast members Cathy Silvers and Michael Lembeck held the unusual distinction of being the second generation of their respective families to appear together in a television show: Their fathers, Phil Silvers and Harvey Lembeck, had acted together in The Phil Silvers Show from 1955 to 1959.

Writers involved in Foley Square were Dennis Danziger, Diane English, Karyl Geld Miller, Bernie Orenstein, Ellen Sandler, Korby Siamis, and Saul Turteltaub. Episode directors were Peter Baldwin, Peter Bonerz, and Ellen Gittelsohn.

== Broadcast history and cancellation ==
Foley Square aired on Wednesdays at 8:30 p.m., paired with Mary Tyler Moore's sitcom Mary at 8:00 p.m. Both shows premiered on December 11, 1985, and languished near the bottom of the Nielsen ratings in the weeks that followed. After the tenth episode of Mary was broadcast on February 19, 1986, Mary went into hiatus as did Foley Square after its eleventh episode aired a week later on February 26, 1986. CBS rescheduled the shows to appear on Tuesdays, with Mary at 9:00 p.m. and Foley Square at 9:30 p.m., hoping that this change would improve their ratings, and telecasts of the two shows resumed on March 25, 1986. Despite the change of day and time, ratings remained low, and both shows were cancelled after only three-episode runs in their new times, with Foley Square's fourteenth and last episode airing on April 8, 1986, right after Mary's thirteenth and last episode.

During the summer of 1986, CBS aired prime-time reruns of Foley Square at 8:00 p.m. on Wednesdays from June 11 to July 23.

== Episodes ==
No.	Title	Directed by	Written by	Original release date
1	"Personals"	Peter Bonerz	Bernie Orenstein & Saul Turteltaub	December 11, 1985
Alex feels that her boss, Jesse, is giving her too many cases to prosecute that are beneath her, such as that of an 85-year-old man who attacked a grocer, even though there are a number of murder cases that he could have assigned to her. Meanwhile, her friends pressure her into placing a personal ad to try to get some romance into her life.
2	"Make My Day"	Peter Bonerz	Diane English	December 18, 1985
Alex cancels her date with Mark so that she can convince a witness to testify in the murder case she is working.
3	"Hey, Landlord"	Peter Bonerz	Bernie Orenstein & Saul Turteltaub	December 25, 1985
After a series of assaults occur in her building, Alex suspects her landlord.
4	"Court-ship"	Peter Bonerz	Diane English	January 8, 1986
Alex finally starts dating a man, but has to put the relationship on hold because he is a reporter covering a case she is prosecuting.
5	"The Star"	Peter Bonerz	Bernie Orenstein & Saul Turteltaub	January 15, 1986
Alex develops a love interest in a movie star who is trying to sue his dishonest business manager. Guest star: Andy Garcia
6	"The Longest Weekend"	Peter Bonerz	Diane English	January 22, 1986
Alex is on call and the only one without plans for the weekend.
7	"The Prosecution Never Rests"	Peter Bonerz	Korby Siamis & Karyl Miller	January 29, 1986
Jesse finally grants Alex her wish and assigns her to an important case, but she feels undervalued and underappreciated as it progresses.
8	"Nobody's Perfect"	Peter Baldwin	Diane English	February 5, 1986
Stressed out at work, Alex sees a doctor who recommends that she take some time off work and relax – but she ignores his advice out of a fear that she would be letting her co-workers down if she did.
9	"Where Angel Goes"	Ellen Gittelsohn	Bernie Orenstein & Saul Turteltaub	February 12, 1986
After Angel is arrested for a robbery he did not commit, Alex bails him out of jail– but she needs him to tell her the truth for her to keep him out of prison.
10	"Kid Stuff"	Peter Bonerz	Diane English	February 19, 1986
Alex must convince a pregnant teenager to testify against the man who raped her.
11	"Jack's Back"	Peter Bonerz	Bernie Orenstein & Saul Turteltaub	February 26, 1986
Alex receives presents from a secret admirer, then discovers that he is a paroled ex-convict who she had prosecuted and put in jail.
12	"Judgment Call"	Ellen Gittelsohn	Dennis Danzinger & Ellen Sandler	March 25, 1986
The judge in Molly's first felony case makes an indecent proposal to Alex.
13	"24 Hours"	Ellen Gittelsohn	Diane English	April 1, 1986
A reporter writing a story watches the District Attorney's office closely, and Alex is frightened when she comes home and walks in on a burglar.
14	"Someone to Watch Over Me"	Peter Baldwin	Bernie Orenstein & Saul Turteltaub	April 8, 1986
After Alex gets a letter threatening her life, Jesse hires a bodyguard to protect her.

== Ratings ==
No.	Title	Air Date	Time	Rank	Rating	Viewers (Millions)
1	"Personals"	December 11, 1985	Wednesday at 8:30 P.M.	#49 of 71	14.9	12.8
2	"Make My Day"	December 18, 1985	Wednesday at 8:30 P.M.	##43 of 66	12.9	11.1
3	"Hey, Landlord"	December 25, 1985	Wednesday at 8:30 P.M.	#49 of 67	11.4	9.8
4	"Court-ship"	January 8, 1986	Wednesday at 8:30 P.M.	#56 of 69	13.4	11.5
5	"The Star"	January 15, 1986	Wednesday at 8:30 P.M.	#59 of 71	12.8	11.0
6	"The Longest Weekend"	January 22, 1986	Wednesday at 8:30 P.M.	#41 of 67	15.3	13.1
7	"The Prosecution Never Rests"	January 29, 1986	Wednesday at 8:30 P.M.	#51 of 68	12.8	11.0
8	"Nobody's Perfect"	February 5, 1986	Wednesday at 8:30 P.M.	#52 of 60	11.5	9.9
9	"Where Angel Goes"	February 12, 1986	Wednesday at 8:30 P.M.	#57 of 66	11.5	9.9
10	"Kid Stuff"	February 19, 1986	Wednesday at 8:30 P.M.	#58 of 68	12.2	10.4
11	"Jack's Back"	February 26, 1986	Wednesday at 8:30 P.M.	#53 of 63	10.5	9.0
12	Judgement Call	March 25, 1986	Tuesday at 9:30 P.M.	#60 of 65	9.0	7.7
13	"24 Hours"	April 1, 1986	Tuesday at 9:30 P.M.	#61 of 67	10.0	8.5
14	""Someone to Watch Over Me""	April 8, 1986	Tuesday at 9:30 P.M.	#64 of 71	8.9	7.6

Source: A.C. Nielsen Company via Los Angeles Times
