= Angels in the Outfield =

Angels in the Outfield may refer to:

- Angels in the Outfield (1951 film), starring Paul Douglas and Janet Leigh
- Angels in the Outfield (1994 film), remake of above, starring Danny Glover, Tony Danza and Christopher Lloyd
