= Heidi 4 Paws =

- Created by: Holly Goldberg Sloan (writer and director)
- Starring: Richard Kind; Angela Lansbury; Steve Guttenberg; Stephen Rea; Meghan Strange
- Country of origin: United States
- Original language: English

Production
- Running time: 60 minutes

Original release
- Network: various public television stations through American Public Television
- Release: October 22, 2008

Heidi 4 Paws is a feature-length children's film that retells the classic story of Heidi using dogs in all the acting roles. Heidi 4 Paws was syndicated to public television stations in the United States through American Public Television and WTTW Chicago in November/December 2008.

Based on the 1881 novel of the little Swiss orphan by Johanna Spyri, Heidi 4 Paws closely follows the original 1880 best-selling novel, but with a canine twist. The young Heidi is sent to live with her reclusive Grandfather high in the Alps. Just as Heidi adjusts to her new life in the mountains, she is taken away by her social worker. Heidi finds herself living in the big city with Clara Sesehound, who has been made an invalid after a debilitating illness. Although Heidi comes to love Clara, her quest to return to the mountains dominates her stay. In the end, she is able to reunite with her beloved Grandfather. When Clara later comes to visit, she miraculously regains her ability to walk.

Heidi 4 Paws is the first in an intended series of eight films that retell classic stories with live action dogs playing all the roles.

== Origins ==
Inspired by the 1930s MGM shorts, Dogville Comedies, children's television series such as Wishbone, and the family film Babe, writer/director Holly Goldberg Sloan (Angels in the Infield and The Big Green) created the 4 Paws brand as a way to revitalize classic literature for a new generation.

Three partners, Tim Goldberg, Tim Ellis, and Chuck Sloan, joined forces to create Goldberg Sloan, and made Heidi 4 Paws independently, without financial support from a major studio. The film took over four years to make, and features a blend of live action photography, 3D animation and visual effects.

== Characters ==
- Heidi: a golden Labrador puppy, Heidi is a precocious orphan who is abandoned into the care of her gruff Grandfather.
- Grandfather: a crusty sheepdog, Grandfather is an Alpine hermit whose life is changed by the love of his little grandpuppy, Heidi.
- Peter the Goatherd: a whippet, Peter the Goatherd is in charge of caring for Grandfather's goats, Daisy and Dusky. He becomes Heidi's first real friend.
- Clara Sesehound: a cockapoo mix, Clara is a wealthy invalid who asks her father for a companion and gets more than she bargained for in Heidi.
- Grandmamma Sesehound: a kind Labrador, Grandmamma brings peace to the Sesehound household and teaches Heidi how to read.
- Detie: a beagle, Detie is Heidi's social worker.
- Sebastian: an apricot poodle, Sebastian is the butler in the Sesehound household.
- The Doctor: a lovable old terrier, the Doctor is a good family friend of the Sesehound's whose kindness to Heidi helps to diagnose her chronic homesickness.
- Miss Rottenmeier: Clara's strict and fussy governess who takes an immediate disliking to Heidi but when Heidi leaves, she misses her and catches a cold.
- Mr. Sesehound: a German Shepherd, Mr. Sesehound is Clara's often absent but well-meaning father.

== Cast ==
- Meghan Strange - voice of Heidi
- Richard Kind - voice of Grandfather
- Julian Sands - voice of Peter the Goatherd
- Kimberly Beck - voice of Clara Sesehound
- Angela Lansbury - voice of Grandmamma Sesehound
- Joanne Baron - voice of Detie
- Steve Guttenberg - voice of Sebastian
- Stephen Rea - voice of The Doctor
- Majandra Delfino - voice of Miss Rottenmeier
- Marshall Bell - voice of Mr. Sesehound
- Mike Fishburn - voice of Mr. Usher the teacher

== Other ==
Sixteen different dogs have roles in the film. All but two of the sixteen dogs were rescue animals, coming from local animal shelters. Only the title role of Heidi, played by eight-week-old purebred yellow lab puppies, and an apricot poodle playing the butler Sebastian, were from breeders. The title character of Heidi was played by nine different puppies. Since the dogs grew as filming progressed, they were only able to work for a week at a time before they had outgrown their role and their costumes.
