= Michael Boisvert =

Canadian actor and choreographer

Michael "Monkey" Boisvert is a Canadian actor and choreographer.

Boisvert studied business at college, but left to become a model. He later turned to acting, moving to New York City and then California to pursue work opportunities. He is a graduate of the American Musical and Dramatic Academy.

Boisvert has appeared in film and television and is most notable for his lead roles in Celeste in the City, Deadly Skies and the television series Young Blades.

== Filmography ==
=== Film ===
Year	Film	Role	Other notes
1995	Street Law	Cop #1	(uncredited)
1998	Mistress of Seduction	Paul	
1999	If on a Winter's Night	The Killer	(Short)
2001	Exit Wounds	SWAT Team Member	
2001	Get Over It	Dancer	
2001	Driven	Japan Reporter #1	
2012	Hail Satan	Jason	(Short)
2014	Corner Gas: The Movie	Survivan Ivan	
2015	Pixels	Secret Service Man	
2017	Undercover Grandpa	Mechanic	(uncredited)
2017	Jigsaw	Lee James	
2018	eHero	Tyler Conway's Father	
2020	Life in a Year	Bouncer	

=== Television ===
Year	Title	Role	Other notes
2001	Brian's Song	Jack Concannon	(TV movie)
2001	Prince Charming	Thisbe	(TV movie)
2001	Singles Court	Edgar	TV series, 1 episode
2003	Tarzan	Detective Tom Bridgham	TV series, 1 episode
2004	Queer as Folk	Outside Bar Guy	TV series, 1 episode
2004	Sue Thomas: F.B.Eye	Limo Driver	TV series, 1 episode
2004	Celeste in the City	Mitch Tanzer	TV movie on ABC Family
2005	Stargate: Atlantis	Bridge Lieutenant	TV series, 1 episode
2005	Young Blades	King Charles II	TV series, 1 episode
2005	This Is Wonderland	Mark Evans	TV series, 1 episode
2006	Behind the Camera: The Unauthorized Story of 'Diff'rent Strokes'	Beverly Hills Cop	(TV movie)
2006	Deadly Skies	Lt. Mark Lewis	(TV movie)
2006	12 Hours to Live	Agent Mark Phillips	(TV movie)
2006	Disaster Zone: Volcano in New York	Ace	(TV movie)
2006	Killer Instinct	Sam	TV series, 1 episode
2007	Rent-a-Goalie	White Gloves	TV series, 1 episode
2010	Murdoch Mysteries	Count Leoline	TV series, 1 episode
2011	XIII: The Series	CIA Agent	TV series, 1 episode
2012	Flashpoint	Ruscitti	TV series, 1 episode
2012	The Firm	D.C Jail Guard	TV series, 1 episode
2012	The Wife He Met Online	Geoffrey Westlin	(TV movie)
2013	The Listener	Nick Markussen	TV series, 1 episode
2014	Hemlock Grove	Guard #1	TV series, 1 episode
2015	Between	Special Ops / Special Forces Guy	TV series, 2 episodes
2016	Suits	Guard	TV series, 2 episode
2016	12 Monkeys	Officer / Security Guard	TV series, 2 episodes
2016	Degrassi: Next Class	Coach	TV series, 1 episode
2016	Bitten	Henchman Chase 1	TV series, 2 episodes
2017	Star Trek: Discovery	Kovil	TV series, 1 episode
2017	The Beaverton	Officer #2	TV series, 1 episode
2017	Salvation	Secret Service	TV series, 1 episode
2017	Played	Cop	TV series, 1 episode
2017	Dark Matter	Ferrous Officer	TV series, 1 episode
2017	Private Eyes	Security Guard	TV series, 1 episode
2017	The Kennedys: Decline and Fall	Detective George Killen	TV mini-series, 1 episode
2017	Mary Kills People	Cop	TV series, 1 episode
2018	Impulse	Colonel Crosby	TV series, 1 episode, uncredited
