= Disaster Zone: Volcano in New York =

- Theatrical poster
- Genre: Disaster; Adventure
- Written by: Sarah Watson
- Directed by: Robert Lee
- Starring: Costas Mandylor; Alexandra Paul; Michael Ironside
- Theme music composer: Michael Richard Plowman
- Country of origin: United States
- Original language: English

Production
- Producers: Jaye Gazeley; Michael Jacobs; Harvey Kahn; Robert Lee; Fernando Szew
- Cinematography: Adam Sliwinski
- Editor: Bethany Sutton
- Running time: 92 minutes
- Production companies: Front Street Pictures; Lava Lane Productions
- Budget: $1 million

Original release
- Release: February 25, 2006

Disaster Zone: Volcano in New York is a 2006 American television disaster film directed by Robert Lee. It stars Costas Mandylor, Alexandra Paul, and Michael Ironside. It was produced by Front Street Pictures and Lava Lane Productions and was distributed by Echo Bridge Home Entertainment.

== Plot ==
A volcano beneath New York City seems unlikely, yet nothing else can explain the bizarre tremors and terrifying explosions wreaking havoc on the city. Tunnel digger Matt MacLachlan, head of the team of "Sandhogs," has witnessed lava seeping into the city's aqueduct system and knows the unimaginable truth. A group of tramps trying to keep warm in Central Park near a heat vent die from carbon dioxide and sulfur dioxide poisoning. A boat in the harbor is caught in a vent and explodes. The FBI Terror Task Force begins looking for the imagined terrorists who killed the tramps and blew up the boat.

Matt is taken off the Sandhogs as some of his men were severely injured, prompting an investigation. Pipes that were supposed to carry water are filled with steaming acid because of the volcano. He reunites with his former wife, Susan, who has been sent to interview him on what happened, and convinces her that there is something seriously wrong in tunnel number three. Together they sneak down into the tunnels, which have been sealed off, and she sees enough to believe him.

Doctor Andrew Levering has been conducting a geothermal energy experiment that triggered volcanic activity. His project drills down seven miles into the earth in a secret location hidden in a warehouse in downtown New York. Neil Kavanagh and other people are financing this project, but since there have been no results, they are ready to pull the funding, forcing Andrew to take more chances to produce instant results.

Matt and Susan go to the Mayor, only to find out that Susan's boss Jacob Reed lets her down. Neil, who is there also, manages to make the idea of a volcano look impossible, so the Mayor dismisses them. Shortly afterward, a homeowner opens the door to his house, only to be buried alive and instantly killed by a stream of molten lava. The whole block of houses goes up in flames, with 72 people missing, all of whom are presumed dead, and the Mayor begins to wonder, while Agent Walters of the FBI's Terror Task Force is given leave to do whatever he has to do.

Matt and Susan drive around the suspect area using a handheld thermal detector and find unnatural heat coming from a warehouse. They enter, but Matt is recognized by Andrew, who then binds them as prisoners. In an effort to produce results, Andrew, by this point, acting in desperation, goes too far, and the workers start to desert as flames leap from the drill hole. He tries to seal it, but flames badly burn him. Meanwhile, Matt and Susan manage to escape as the unleashed lava causes the warehouse to explode. The effects of Andrew's latest efforts are seen on the streets of New York as lava spouts out of manholes and buildings catch fire, killing thousands and causing untold damage.

The Mayor sees what is happening from his office, and Neil reluctantly admits his part. He decides on an evacuation of the city. But all is not lost, as Matt has an idea. He tells his work crew that an explosion in the right place will divert the lava along the city's aqueduct tunnels and into the nearby sea. The race is then on to do it in time, but Andrew, who survived his burns but was horribly disfigured and now stalking the city streets with a gun, learns of their plans via a television broadcast. The deranged doctor follows the team into the tunnels and faces Matt and Susan as they attempt to set the charges necessary to open the tunnels. Delusively believing that his project is still viable, Andrew shoots Matt, but one of his shots goes astray and destabilizes the wall, releasing steam that blinds him. Matt and Susan escape from the tunnels just in time to avoid the lava flow, while Andrew is killed in the eruption. Their plan works, and the city is saved.

== Cast ==
- Costas Mandylor as Matt MacLachlan
- Michael Ironside as Andrew Levering
- Alexandra Paul as Dr. Susan Foxley
- Michael Boisvert as "Ace"
- Eric Breker as R.J.
- Ron Selmour as Frank
- Pascale Hutton as Karen
- Zak Santiago as Jose
- Robert Moloney as Jacob Reed
- Kaj-Erik Eriksen as Joey
- Matthew Bennett as FBI Agent Walters
- Andrew Kavadas as Tommy
- Kevin McNulty as Neil Kavanagh
- Tom Heaton as Hal
- Louis Chirillo as Paulie
- William MacDonald as Site Director
- William Taylor as Mayor
- Claire Riley as Newscaster
- Robert Morton as Home Owner

== Release ==
While the film was originally released in North America in 2006, it has appeared in other countries in the following years. France, Germany, and Argentina received the film a year later, followed by Hungary in 2008. In 2009, the film was released in Italy.
