= State's Evidence =

- Directed by: Benjamin Louis
- Written by: Mark Brown
- Starring: Douglas Smith, Alexa Vega, Majandra Delfino, Kris Lemche, Cody McMains, Drew Tyler Bell
- Distributed by: Terra Entertainment
- Release date: November 7, 2006
- Running time: 89 minutes
- Language: English

State's Evidence is a direct-to-DVD independent film released in 2006 starring Douglas Smith, Alexa Vega, Majandra Delfino, Kris Lemche, Cody McMains, and Drew Tyler Bell.

== Plot ==
Scott declares his intention to kill himself and say goodbye to his friends and relatives. And to shoot it with his camera. At school he tells his five best friends (Brian, Rick, Patrick, Trudi, Sandy), who try to reassure him. But then they decide to kill themselves too and buy cameras for everyone, aiming to upload complete videos to a website. Patrick occasionally filmed a local bully Tyrone Johnson with his girlfriend. And was beaten by him for that. Patrick starts a plan to kill students who irritate him before killing himself. He films a video where he makes a list of the students he'll kill. Which is found by one of the boys and shown to the others. He is yelled at by Sandy and Trudi, which Trudi says he's losing it. But Patrick says that it was just a joke.

Sandy (Alexa Vega) and Scott slowly fall in love with each other, while Trudi and Brian become close friends. Before the joint suicide, Patrick creates a tape where he rapes and kills an innocent little girl in a supermarket. His tape is found by Scott and is shown to the others. Despite Patrick's begging for it back. Sandy calls him a murderer. The boys decide not to tell anyone about that video. Except to save it on a camera, which they call "State's Evidence".

They all arrange to meet at school at one time in the same place and go to sleep. However, Patrick and Rick get up earlier and go to school. In the hall Patrick loads his gun and tells Rick to follow him and film everything he does. When Patrick comes around the corner, he starts shooting students. Then he looks for Tyrone and his friends. Other friends come to a corridor and see killed and injured schoolmates. Scott hurries to stop Patrick. He finds Patrick threatening and abusing Tyrone who is crying on his knees. And Rick's still filming everything. Scott offers Patrick to let Tyrone go and "take him instead" but Patrick injures Scott and then kills Tyrone with one shot. Rick throws the camera and runs away.

Patrick takes the camera and pulls the wounded Scott to a science room. There he says on camera that it wasn't a random killing. He aimed to attract the attention of the American people. He hopes that his act will stop teenage suicides and bullying at school. He then shoots himself in the head. Scott finally admits he did it all out of pure boredom. And that he wants to live before dying. The police arrive, they find both boys dead and switch off the camera.

The film ends with Scott's mother crying near the TV set.

== Reception ==
Reviews were negative to mixed.
