= The Shooter (1995 film) =

1995 American action drama film

- Promotional release poster
- Directed by: Ted Kotcheff
- Written by: Yves André Martin; Meg Thayer; Billy Ray
- Produced by: Silvio Muraglia; Paul Pompian
- Starring: Dolph Lundgren; Maruschka Detmers; Assumpta Serna; Gavan O'Herlihy; John Ashton
- Cinematography: Fernando Arguelles
- Edited by: Ralph Brunjes
- Music by: Stefano Mainetti
- Production companies: Adelson-Baumgarten Productions; Muraglia/Sladek Filmworks; Newmarket Capital Group; Canal+ Conquistador Entertainment; Arco Films S.L. Etamp-Netto; Romivest; Transatlantique Films
- Distributed by: Conquistador Entertainment; Miramax
- Release date: December 15, 1995 (UK)
- Running time: 104 minutes
- Countries: United States; Czech Republic; United Kingdom; France; Spain
- Language: English
- Budget: $11 million

The Shooter (also released as Hidden Assassin) is a 1995 American action thriller film directed by Ted Kotcheff and starring Dolph Lundgren as a deputy United States Marshal who gets caught up in politics when he is hired to solve the assassination of a Cuban ambassador.

This was the final theatrical film directed by Kotcheff before his death in 2025.

== Plot ==
A federal marshal gets caught up in political intrigue after he gets brought in to solve the murder of a Cuban ambassador.

== Cast ==
- Dolph Lundgren as U.S. Marshal Michael Dane
- Maruschka Detmers as Simone Rosset
- Assumpta Serna as Marta
- Gavan O'Herlihy as Dick Powell
- John Ashton as Alex Reed
- Simón Andreu as Alberto Torena
- Pablo Scola as Belgado
- Petr Drozda as Marcus
- Roslav Walter as Police Captain
- Pavel Vokoun as Henchman
- Martin Hub as Henchman
- Jiri Kraus as Cab Driver
- Guilio Kukurugya as Cuban Ambassador
- Enid Rose as Mistress

== Production ==
=== Filming ===
The movie was filmed mainly in the Czech Republic, in Prague. The story was initially set in France but was changed to the Czech Republic.

== Release ==
=== Alternate versions ===
There are two versions released for this film: the international cut running 104 minutes, and the shorter cut running 89 minutes, released in the U.S. and France.
