= The Secret Life of Girls =

- Directed by: Holly Goldberg Sloan
- Written by: Holly Goldberg Sloan
- Produced by: Mark Borman; Dan Parada
- Starring: Majandra Delfino; Linda Hamilton; Eugene Levy; Meagan Good; Kate Vernon; Emily Osment
- Cinematography: Ralf D. Bode
- Edited by: Shawna Callahan
- Music by: Andrew Gross
- Production companies: Her Way; Ocean Park Pictures; Overseas FilmGroup
- Release date: 29 May 1999 (USA)
- Running time: 90 minutes
- Country: United States
- Language: English
- Budget: $2,500,000 (estimated)

The Secret Life of Girls is a 1999 comedy-drama film directed and written by Holly Goldberg Sloan, and starring Majandra Delfino, Linda Hamilton, Eugene Levy, Meagan Good, Kate Vernon and Emily Osment in her film debut.

== Premise ==
A teenager discovers how difficult growing up can be in 1973.
