= Cathy Silvers =

American actress

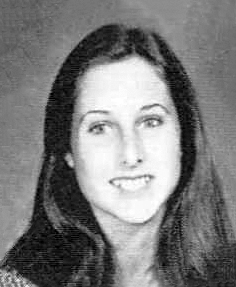
- Silvers in her 1978 high school junior yearbook
- Born: New York City, U.S.
- Occupations: Actress; author
- Years active: 1980–1996
- Spouses: Alexander Burnett (m. 1988–1996); David Fullmer; (m. 2001–present)
- Children: 5
- Father: Phil Silvers

Cathy Silvers is an American actress and author. She is the daughter of actress Evelyn Patrick and actor/comedian Phil Silvers. She is best known for her role as boy-crazy teenager Jenny Piccolo in later seasons of the TV sitcom Happy Days. She was a member of the cast of the 1985–86 sitcom Foley Square. She also provided the voice of Marie Dodo, Big Bird's adoptive sister, in Sesame Street Presents: Follow That Bird.

As of August 2002, she was an announcer for the TV series SoapTalk on the cable station SoapNet.

She is the author of the 2007 book Happy Days Healthy Living.

== Early life ==
Cathy Silvers was born in New York City. She is the daughter of actor Phil Silvers and his wife, Evelyn, a model and former Miss Florida. She has four sisters, one of whom is her twin. The family moved to Los Angeles when she was 6 months old. She graduated from Beverly Hills High School where, with her mother's encouragement, she starred in plays and participated for four years in dramatic and humorous interpretation categories in forensics competition. She subsequently studied drama at California State University, Northridge.

== Personal life ==
Silvers was married to doctor Alexander Burnett in August 1988, and they had two children. They divorced in 1996. She married entertainment lawyer David Fullmer in 2001, and they had two children and raised a stepchild.

Silvers earned a degree in marketing from American University. She formed her own business after she finished acting in Hollywood. A vegan, she operates a service that delivers organic produce from farmers’ markets to customers throughout Los Angeles County.

== Filmography ==
Film and Television
Year	Title	Role	Notes
1980–84	Happy Days	Jenny Piccolo	recurring (season 8–9); main (season 10); guest (season 11 finale)
1983	High School U.S.A.	Peggy	television movie
1985	1st & Ten	Betty Ann Smith	episode: "The Sins of the Quarterback"
1985	The Love Boat	Robin Mills	episode: "No Dad of Mine"
1985	Sam	Susan	television pilot
1985	Sesame Street Presents: Follow That Bird	Marie Dodo (voice)	feature film
1985	The Paper Chase	Weinstein	episode: "The Choice"
1985	Punky Brewster	Mrs. Darney	episode: "Baby Buddies, Inc."
1985–86	Foley Square	Molly Dobbs	main cast (14 episodes)
1994	Wings	Phoebe	episode: "Insanity Claus"
1995	Too Something	Janet	episodes: "Foreign Affair" and "Meter Feeders"
1995	Cleghorne!	Coral	main cast (12 episodes)
1996	Sgt. Bilko	1st Lt. Monday	feature film
1996	Encino Woman	Susan	television movie

== Works ==
- Happy Days Healthy Living: From Sit-Com Teen to the Health-Food Scene. North Atlantic Books. 2007. pp. 336pp. ISBN 978-1556437144.
