= Angels in the Infield =

2000 American TV movie

- Genre: Adventure; Comedy; Drama
- Based on: Angels in the Outfield by Richard Conlin
- Screenplay by: Robert King; Garrett K. Shiff
- Story by: Holly Goldberg Sloan; Robert King
- Directed by: Robert King
- Starring: Patrick Warburton; Brittney Irvin; David Alan Grier; Kurt Fuller
- Music by: Ira Newborn
- Country of origin: United States

Production
- Executive producer: Roger Birnbaum
- Producers: Fitch Cady; Deb LeFaive; Holly Goldberg Sloan; Irby Smith; Gary Stutman
- Production location: Rogers Centre (Toronto)
- Cinematography: James Gardner
- Editor: Corky Ehlers
- Running time: 89 minutes
- Production companies: Walt Disney Television; Roger Birnbaum Productions

Original release
- Network: ABC
- Release: April 9, 2000

Angels in the Infield is a 2000 American sports comedy television film directed by Robert King and starring Patrick Warburton, Brittney Irvin, David Alan Grier, and Kurt Fuller. A follow-up to the 1994 film Angels in the Outfield and the 1997 film Angels in the Endzone, it is about a group of angels trying to help a baseball team win a championship game, while at the same time helping to reunite the team's pitcher's family. The Anaheim Angels are again featured, in a reprise of the role that the team played during Angels in the Outfield. The film originally aired on ABC on April 9, 2000, as part of The Wonderful World of Disney.

== Plot ==
When Eddie Everett was a rookie in 1992, he was one of the best pitchers of his time. He led the California Angels to the American League Championship Series, where they played the Boston Red Sox, and were one out away from making it to the World Series (this same situation occurred in real life, but in 1986, not 1992). When a rookie playing for the Red Sox hits a ground ball to Eddie, he drops the ball and is unable to get the other player out, while the runners he let on base score, losing a chance for the Angels to make it to the World Series. Ever since then, Eddie has never been the same pitcher or the same person.

Six years later, Eddie and his wife, Claire are divorced, and he has barely kept contact with their thirteen-year-old daughter, Laurel. However, at a game where the Anaheim Angels are playing the fictitious Arizona Crimson Devils, and they lose, Claire says that she is taking a job in Boston and is leaving Laurel with him. When he takes her back home, she realizes that his life isn't at all what she thought it'd be. He can't get over losing that game in his rookie year, and one night Laurel prays for him to get a second chance.

Shortly afterward, underappreciated angel and former Angels pitcher Bob Bugler, who himself had his career end in disgrace, is sent to answer her prayer. He and the other angels help the team have an incredible winning streak, right when Eddie was about to get cut from the team. Soon, Eddie's game improves, as does his relationship with Laurel.

As the season ends, the Angels and the Crimson Devils are forced to play in a one-game playoff to determine which team will represent the American League in the World Series. The devil makes a deal with Randy Fleck, the Crimson Devils' star player who was also the one who hit the grounder that blew the 1992 ALCS for the Angels, for Eddie to lose the game, and everything he cares about, in exchange for his soul. He agrees.

The devil makes the game delayed thanks to rain, and Eddie leaves to see Laurel's ballet recital. To get him to the game faster, Bob speeds up the recital. When he gets to the game, the Crimson Devils are up 2-0 in the bottom of the eighth inning. The Angels soon score three runs thanks to a home run by Eric Jacobs, who had a demon holding him back. Bob explains to Laurel that he and the other angels are unable to interfere in a championship game because championship have to be won on their own. When the ninth inning comes, Eddie gets two quick outs, but then a player hits a triple. When Randy Fleck comes to the plate and Eddie quietly asks God for help, Bob appears to him and tells him that his newfound confidence, as well as his family's confidence in him, is all he needs to win the game. Encouraged, Eddie pitches to Fleck, who once again hits a ground ball, but this time Eddie manages to catch it and throw it to first base, winning the game and the Angels won the pennant. The stadium cheers, and Eddie hugs Laurel and kisses Claire.

== Cast ==
- Patrick Warburton as Eddie "Steady" Everett
- Brittney Irvin as Laurel Everett
  - Hannah Lochner as Young Laurel
- David Alan Grier as Bob Bugler
- Colin Fox as The Devil
- Kurt Fuller as Simon
- Rebecca Jenkins as Claire Everett
- Duane Davis as Randy Fleck
- Beau Starr as Gus Keeler
- Peter Keleghan as Dexter Deekin
- David Duran as Rex Lumbar
- Rufus Crawford as Assistant Manager
- Tamara Hickey as Pretty Elevator Woman
- Kyle Kass as Piano Playing Kid (credited as Kyle Kassardjian)
- Guilio Kukurugya as St. Peter (credited as Cuilio Kukurugya)
- Paul A. MacFarlane as Babe Ruth (Angel)
- Rachel Skarsten as Brigitte
- Zoltan Buday as Devil's Minion (uncredited)

== See also ==
- List of films about angels
- List of baseball films
