= Paul Salata =

American football player (1926–2021)

- Salata in 1949

No. 22, 55, 51, 86, 75
- Position: End

Personal information
- Born: October 17, 1926; Los Angeles, California, U.S.
- Died: October 16, 2021 (aged 94); Newport Beach, California, U.S.
- Listed height: 6 ft 2 in (1.88 m)
- Listed weight: 191 lb (87 kg)

Career information
- High school: Franklin (Los Angeles)
- College: USC (1944, 1946–1947)
- NFL draft: 1951: 10th round, 118th overall pick

Career history
- Los Angeles Bulldogs (1948); San Francisco 49ers (1949–1950); Baltimore Colts (1950); Calgary Stampeders (1952); Ottawa Rough Riders (1953)

Awards and highlights
- CFL All-Star (1952)

Career NFL/AAFC statistics
- Receptions: 74
- Receiving yards: 907
- Receiving touchdowns: 8
- Stats at Pro Football Reference

Paul Thomas Salata (October 17, 1926 – October 16, 2021) was an American professional football player who was a wide receiver in the National Football League (NFL), All-America Football Conference (AAFC) and Western Interprovincial Football Union (WIFU). Salata is best known for creating the Mr. Irrelevant Award, granted to the player selected last in each year's NFL draft.

== Biography ==
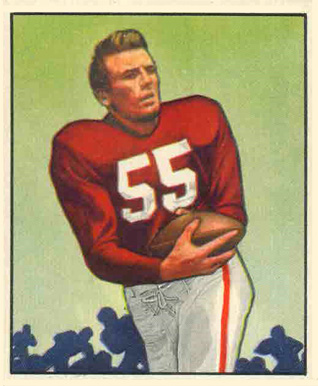
Salata on a 1950 Bowman football card.

Paul Salata was born to a Serbian-born father and second generation Serbian-American mother. After his college football days at USC Salata played for the AAFC/NFL's San Francisco 49ers (1949–1950) and the AAFC/NFL's Baltimore Colts (1950). After the Colts franchise folded in 1950, he was declared draft-eligible and was subsequently drafted in the tenth round of the 1951 NFL draft by the Pittsburgh Steelers. He scored the 49ers final touchdown in the All-American Football Conference, as well as the team's first TD in the NFL. He also played in the CFL, including with the Calgary Stampeders in 1952 and the Ottawa Rough Riders in 1953.

In later years, Salata became known for his creation in 1976 of the Mr. Irrelevant Award, awarded annually to the last overall pick in the year's NFL draft. After retiring from football, he joined his family's Southern California construction business. He has also acted in a number of Hollywood movies. He played Tony Minelli in Angels in the Outfield (1951) and appeared, uncredited, in the 1953 film Stalag 17 as a prisoner.

Salata died on October 16, 2021, one day before his 95th birthday. He is buried at Pacific View Memorial Park.
