= Jayce and the Wheeled Warriors =

1985 animated TV series

- Logotype
- Jayce et les Conquérants de la Lumière (Jayce and the Conquerors of Light)
- Genre: Sci-fi/Animation
- Developed by: J. Michael Straczynski
- Voices of: Darrin Baker; Len Carlson; Luba Goy; Charles Jolliffe; Valerie Politis; Dan Hennessey; Giulio Kukurugya
- Narrated by: Ernie Anderson
- Opening theme: "Jayce and the Wheeled Warriors Opening Theme", performed by Shuki Levy
- Ending theme: "Keep on Rolling", performed by Shuki Levy
- Composers: Shuki Levy; Haim Saban
- Countries of origin: France; Canada
- Original languages: French; English
- No. of seasons: 1
- No. of episodes: 65

Production
- Executive producers: Jean Chalopin; John Kemeny
- Running time: 22 min.
- Production companies: DIC Audiovisuel; ICC TV Productions, Ltd.

Original release
- Network: TF1 (France); Syndication (United States)
- Release: September 9 – December 16, 1985

Jayce and the Wheeled Warriors (French: Jayce et les Conquérants de la Lumière) is an animated show which was first broadcast on TF1 on September 9, 1985, on the block Salut les p'tits loups!, and eventually on September 16 in the United States in syndication. It was produced by DIC Audiovisuel (originally distributed for syndication by SFM Entertainment) and animated by the Japanese animation studios Sunrise, Shaft, Studio Giants, Studio Look and Swan Production. The show, which ran for 65 twenty-minute episodes, was created to support Mattel's Wheeled Warriors toyline. The show had an ongoing plot which was left unresolved, with no series finale.

"Thundering across the stars to save the universe from the Monster Minds, Jayce searches for his father to unite the magic root and lead his Lightning League to victory over the changing form of Saw Boss. Wheeled Warriors explode into battle - Lightning Strikes!"

— opening narration, read by Ernie Anderson.

The show featured two duelling forces. The heroes are called the Lightning League, led by a teenager named Jayce who drive white and silver vehicles with assorted weaponry. The villains are organic plant-based creatures called the Monster Minds who travel via large green organic vines, which can grow in and across interstellar space, and sprout seeds that grow rapidly into further Monster Minds. They are led by the very first of the Monster Minds, Saw Boss.

== Background ==
The series was created to accompany the pre-existing line of toys. No backstory was given with the toys for the Lightning League and the Monster Minds doing battle, and so distinct characters were created by DIC and Straczynski to allow for a structured story.

Most of the episodes were written by the French writers Jean Chalopin and Haskell Barkin. Writers at DIC also included Larry DiTillio, Barbara Hambly and J. Michael Straczynski. Straczynski wrote about a quarter of the episodes, attempting, in his words, to "hijack a dopey concept and make it into something more". Haim Saban and Shuki Levy provided the music for the show. Nearly a decade later, it was rerun on USA Network's USA Cartoon Express block from July 3, 1994 to August 25, 1995.

In the United Kingdom, the series was first screened in some regions on the ITV network in a Sunday early morning slot in 1985, but with not all of the regional franchises having a Sunday morning service at that time, it was moved to Channel 4 where it was broadcast nationally for the first time in 1986. The series was subsequently frequently repeated on Sky Channel between 1989 and 1993.

=== Plot ===
The series follows protagonists Jayce, Flora, Herc Stormsailor, Oon and Gillian in their search for Jayce's father, Audric. Meanwhile, they are opposing the main antagonist Saw Boss and his followers, the Monster Minds. Audric was a botanist who performed experiments with biotechnology, and one experiment created Flora. In another experiment, Audric attempted to create a plant that could prevent starvation. But when he succeeded, a nearby star exploded into a supernova. The radiation from the supernova's explosion changed the plant and four others into the Monster Minds; a race of plant-like monsters who wish to conquer the universe. Audric created a root that could destroy the Monster Minds, but was forced to flee before he could complete the task, after which the Monster Minds made Audric's laboratory their headquarters. Audric kept half of the root himself and gave the other half to his servant, the Eternal Squire Oon, whom he sent to serve Jayce. Jayce and his friends are thereafter on a quest to find Audric and form the complete root.

== Film ==
Due to less than successful toy sales, the series' 65-episode run was not extended and the series had ended unresolved, but according to Straczynski, a film had also been commissioned along with the series, following in the footsteps of other toy-based animated series such as Transformers and G.I. Joe; if the series had proven successful by increasing toy sales, production would have begun. Straczynski wrote the script, but due to the failure of the toy line, preparation for the film was shelved.

Had the movie been filmed, it would have provided a finale for the series, with Jayce and his Lightning League meeting the original Lightning League and being trained on the home world of the Guardians. Jayce would be reunited with his father Audric, but Audric would have been killed by Saw Boss as the Monster Minds began a final assault on the galaxy, and in a final battle, Jayce would unite the root and destroy Saw Boss, ending the Monster Mind threat forever.

== Characters ==
=== Lightning League ===
- Jayce: The protagonist and the bearer of the Legendary Ring of Light and half of the Magic Root.
- Audric: Jayce's father and the original master of Oon, he is the creator of the Magic Root (of which he bears the other half), the Monster Minds, Flora, and the early Lightning League vehicles.
- Gillian: A wizard and mentor to Jayce and Flora, he is Flora's co-creator and the creator of all five Lightning League vehicles. He is implied to be centuries old.
- Flora: A flower created and developed into a humanoid by Gillian and Audric, she has telepathic powers with which she can sense Monster Minds and can communicate with animals & plants.
- Oon: An Eternal Squire, created by Squiresmith Wixland, Oon originally served Audric, but has since been appointed to Jayce.
- Herc Stormsailor: A mercenary who is the proud owner and pilot of the space barge The Pride Of The Skies II, he used to have a close relationship with Pirate Queen Morgana and it is implied he once was a member of the Pirate Guild. He was once an intergalactic commando before he quit. He was largely modeled after Han Solo.
- Brock is Flora's flying fish mount, which "speaks" in chirps and whistles.
- The Zoggies are a trio of robotic canines. They seem to have a liking for Oon, who is almost always being chased by them.
- Jal Gorda is anthropomorphic alien spy who acts as a recurring guest character throughout the series. He was rescued by Audric from a Monster Mind invasion of his village and has been loyal to him ever since.

=== Monster Minds ===
- Saw Boss is the leader of the Monster Minds. He was spawned from the very plant that Audric had intended to end starvation.
- Gun Grinner: A sub-boss of the Monster Minds, he oversees the Gun Trooper clones.
- Terror Tank: A sub-boss of the Monster Minds, he oversees the Terror Trooper clones.
- K.O. Kruiser: A sub-boss of the Monster Minds, he oversees the KO Trooper clones.
- Beast Walker Commander: A sub-boss of the Monster Minds, he oversees the Beast Walker clones.
- Saw Trooper Commander is the only one other than Saw Boss that can take a humanoid form. He is smaller in stature than Saw Boss and is notable by the stripes on his chest and the absence of a cape.
- Dr. Zorg is a scientist working with Saw Boss.

== Lightning League vehicles ==
Every Lightning League vehicle can be driven by members of the League. They can also operate on pre-programmed battle plans, without drivers, through commands issued on Jayce's communicator. When he talks to the vehicles, they respond with a single phrase, "Command Acknowledged".

1st Lightning League AI Ground Vehicles created by Gillian:

- Armed Force is a vehicle with a large golden grappling arm mounted atop it. Gillian had intended it for Audric, but instead he gave it to Jayce, when Audric was unable to join the League. It seats two, unlike its toy counterpart. Armed Force's toy counterpart included a gimmick dubbed "Stack n' Attack". Any of the other smaller vehicles could detach their wheeled chassis and attach to the top of Armed Force. A promotional comic in He-Man magazine showed two vehicles stacked atop Armed Force, though this was physically impossible using the toys, as only Armed Force featured two lined up holes suitable for another vehicle's underside to attach into. This never happens in the show; instead, the phrase "stack n' attack" refers to the Lightning League vehicles being able to exchange weapons mid-battle. The pilots are Jayce and Oon, although in "The Vase of Xiang", Flora and Brock drive it as they attempt to rescue Jayce.
- Drill Sergeant is a two-seater vehicle with a drill to dig tunnels. It is also equipped with two pop-out guns in the front of the cab. It is driven in the opening sequence by Flora.
- Quickdraw is a vehicle with a concealed gun in a shield atop the vehicle, and an extended arm at the front with a spiked wheel for digging. It seats one, Gillian drives it in the opening sequence, but it has no regular driver in the series.
- Spike Trike is a three-wheeled vehicle built for speed. Similar to a half-tracked dune buggy, it has a pair of crunching spiked wheels at the front that lift on a single arm. Herc drives it in the opening sequence, and it is his vehicle of choice during the series as well, but in the episode "Deadly Reunion", it refuses to allow Herc to pilot it, stating that it only responds to Jayce's commands.
- Trailblazer is a large, robotic, four-legged vehicle with a front-mounted battering ram, capable of carrying the smaller vehicles. It usually seats one, but is occasionally seen with unused seating for four. Trailblazer is stronger and more durable (other than being crushed by the Monster Mind's Battle Base, in the episode "The Purple Tome") than the other vehicles, but was used much less often for reasons never disclosed (unlike the expenditure of resources that served as an excuse for the more rarely used larger vehicle troopers of the Monster Minds). Trailblazer is depicted as much larger in scale with the other vehicles than the toy counterparts. While the toy version of Trailblazer could carry a single smaller vehicle on its back, the cartoon counterpart could carry four of the smaller vehicles within its body, via a platform that lowered from its underside, every member of the Lightning League can pilot the Trailblazer.
- Battle Base is a mobile fortress that houses all the other vehicles, and it is usually attached to the Pride as its bridge. The main weapon is a large elevating gun turret. Battle Base, like Trailblazer, is of a much larger relative scale in the animation than in its toy form. The toy for Battle Base had three garages that could each hold a single smaller vehicle, and its control bridge seated two. In the series, not only could Battle Base contain all of the smaller vehicles, but even Trailblazer was seen to be able to enter it. The bridge was a rather large full room; just like Trailblazer, every member of the Lightning League can also pilot the Battle Base as well too.

2nd Lightning League AI Ground Vehicles created by Gillian:

- Flingshot is a vehicle equipped with a catapult, built in "The Stallions of Sandeen". A toy was designed, but never produced.
- Spray Gunner is a vehicle with a cannon that sprays various fluids, that was added later in the series, but has no introductory episode. The toy did not reach the production stage.
- Motor Module is a low-riding vehicle with a powerful drive system, often used to field repair other vehicles, or to haul loads in an attachable trailer. It was added later in the series, but has no introductory episode. The toy did not reach the production stage, but was designed to be motorized, and could "Stack n' Attack" as Armed Force could (the toy version of the gimmick remained unused in the cartoon).

Lightning League AI Air And Space Vehicles:

- Pride of the Skies II: Also known as "The Pride" for short, it is the space barge owned by Herc Stormsailor and home to the Lightning League throughout the series.
- Space Scooter is a small air-bike.
- Emergency Cruiser is the Pride's seldom used shuttle craft.

== The Monster Minds vehicles ==
Generally, Monster Mind battles are carried out by clones of the main Monster Minds that are grown from vines. Saw Boss is able to communicate with these clones telepathically. These clones are referred to as "troopers"; Saw Trooper, Terror Trooper, K.O. Trooper, etc. The true Monster Minds change from their humanoid forms into vehicles upon leaving their headquarters, although they are significantly larger and more powerful than their mass-produced clones.

The 1st Monster Minds' Ground Legions:

- Saw Trooper is a vehicle with a large buzzsaw on a rotating stalk.
- Gun Trooper is a vehicle with a cluster of cannons clenched in its teeth. The main weapon is a multi-headed spiked flail mounted on top of the body.
- Terror Trooper is a tank-like vehicle with a large, Venus flytrap-like mouth mounted on the body.
- K.O. Trooper is a truck-like vehicle with a large wrecking ball-like stalk. The front grill and headlights look like an angry face.
- Beast Walker is a large, four-legged vehicle with a front-mounted claw weapon that is the powerhouse of a Monster Mind clone army. They were seldom used, due to the greater energy required to spawn. Like Trailblazer, they greatly resemble the AT-ATs from Star Wars.

The second Monster Minds' Ground Legions:

- Flapjack is a van-like vehicle with a catapult; they were designed, but not produced in the toy line.
- Lurcher is a vehicle with a front ram; they were not produced in the toy line.
- Snapdragon is a smaller four-legged walking vehicle with front-mounted "petals" that opened like a flower to expose a laser cannon.
- Battle Station is the Monster Minds' answer to Battle Base, but it was not produced in the toy line. It was used in only one episode as it took enormous amounts of energy to spawn.

The Monster Minds' Air and Space Legions:

- Cruiser is a larger Monster Mind spacecraft.
- Scout/Satellite is a smaller Monster Mind spacecraft.
- Drill Vine is a small rocket craft with a drill nose cone, containing a Monster Mind vine cluster, which was used to penetrate targets and release a growth of vines.
- Pod is a plant-like insertion craft launched by Cruisers or Scouts, when Drill Vines were not called for.
- Space Fighter is a small Monster Mind starfighter, used much less commonly than Scouts.

The Monster Minds' Network of Legions:

- Expansion Vine is a large vine growth used to infest a planet and spawn Monster Mind Troopers, also sometimes used to connect planets through open space.
- Spore Vine is not as large as Expansion Vine, but they are used to deploy biological weapons in the form of gases.
- Receptacle is a block-like plant that is used to form a teleportation point for Saw Boss's headquarters (originally Audric's lab).
- Brain is a small plant mass with a single central eye, used for communication by Monster Mind agents of other races.

== Episodes ==
#	Title	US air date
1	"Escape from the Garden of Evil"	September 16, 1985
2	"The Vase of Xiang"	September 17, 1985
3	"Steel Against Shadow"	September 18, 1985
4	"Silver Crusaders"	September 19, 1985
5	"Ghostship"	September 20, 1985
6	"Flora, Fauna and the Monster Minds"	September 23, 1985
7	"Fire and Ice"	September 24, 1985
8	"Space Outlaws"	September 25, 1985
9	"Future of the Future"	September 26, 1985
10	"Underwater"	September 27, 1985
11	"Frostworld"	September 30, 1985
12	"Critical Mass"	October 1, 1985
13	"The Purple Tome"	October 2, 1985
14	"Hook, Line and Silver"	October 3, 1985
15	"Bloodstone"	October 4, 1985
16	"The Slaves of Adelbaren"	October 7, 1985
17	"The Hunt"	October 8, 1985
18	"Blockade Runners"	October 9, 1985
19	"The Sleeping Princess"	October 10, 1985
20	"Deadly Reunion"	October 11, 1985
21	"Sky Kingdom"	October 14, 1985
22	"Quest into Shadow"	October 15, 1985
23	"Unexpected Trouble"	October 16, 1985
24	"Bounty Hunters"	October 17, 1985
25	"Double Deception"	October 18, 1985
26	"Gate World"	October 21, 1985
27	"Space Thief"	October 22, 1985
28	"Moon Magic"	October 23, 1985
29	"Affair of Honor"	October 24, 1985
30	"Doomed Flower"	October 25, 1985
31	"The Stallions of Sandeen"	October 28, 1985
32	"Brain Trust"	October 29, 1985
33	"Lightning Strikes Twice"	October 30, 1985
34	"The Liberty Stone"	November 1, 1985
35	"The Vines"	November 4, 1985
36	"The Space Fighter"	November 5, 1985
37	"Heart of Paxtar"	November 6, 1985
38	"Appointment at Forever"	November 7, 1985
39	"What's Going On?"	November 8, 1985
40	"Dark Singer"	November 11, 1985
41	"Swamp Witch"	November 12, 1985
42	"Deadly Reflections"	November 13, 1985
43	"Early Warning"	November 14, 1985
44	"A Question of Conscience"	November 15, 1985
45	"Life Ship"	November 18, 1985
46	"The Mirage Makers"	November 19, 1985
47	"Do Not Disturb"	November 20, 1985
48	"Dreamworld"	November 21, 1985
49	"The Children of Solarus II"	November 22, 1985
50	"The Gardener"	November 25, 1985
51	"Armada"	November 26, 1985
52	"The Chimes of Sharpis"	November 27, 1985
53	"Galaxy Gamester"	November 28, 1985
54	"Circus Planet"	November 29, 1985
55	"Common Bond"	December 2, 1985
56	"Mistress of Soul Tree"	December 3, 1985
57	"The Life Eater"	December 4, 1985
58	"Wasteland"	December 5, 1985
59	"The Oracle"	December 6, 1985
60	"Short Circuit, Long Wait"	December 9, 1985
61	"Time and Time Again"	December 10, 1985
62	"The Source"	December 11, 1985
63	"The Raid"	December 12, 1985
64	"The Squire Smith"	December 13, 1985
65	"Final Ride at Journey's End"	December 16, 1985

== Cast ==
- Darrin Baker as Jayce
- Charles Joliffe as Gillian
- Gilles Tamiz as Oon (uncredited)
- Luba Goy as Oon (alternate; uncredited)
- John Stocker as Gun Grinner (uncredited)
- Dan Hennessey as Audric, K.O. Kruiser, and Saw Trooper
- Valerie Politis as Flora
- Giulio Kukurugya as Saw Boss
- Len Carlson as Herc Stormsailor and Terror Tank
- Peter Lewis as The opening announcer (uncredited)
- Ernie Anderson as The main opening announcer (uncredited)
- Victor Lanoux as The closing announcer (uncredited)

== Mattel Wheeled Warriors toys ==
Originally conceived as a line of toy vehicles with "stack & attack" as a selling point, the tagline was: "Monster Minds gone mad! Lightning League to the rescue!".

The vehicles could be mixed and matched across most of the product line to allow children to create their own combinations. Accessory packs were released with extra wheels and weapons to allow for even more options. A mini comic was included with the toys, but no overarching storyline was established beyond premise of the Monster Minds versus the Lightning League. Characters included with the toys were blank human drivers as pilots of the Lightning League vehicles and green brains for the Monster Minds.

Mattel ordered an animated series to promote the product, but development on this did not start until after the toys had already been produced and sales of the toys had been disappointing. When the animated series premiered, it had a vastly different storyline and, aside from the vehicles and their names, nothing linked the toys to the animated series so the show did little to boost sales.

Due to the success of the animated series, Mattel developed new drivers for a second series of vehicles that more resembled their animated counterparts, as well as new vehicles, but the toys never made it to the shelves.

Series 1 - 1985
Name	Log Line	Allegiance	Type	Item number
Armed Force	Lightning League Leader	The Lightning League	Vehicle	9001
Drill Sergeant	Lightning League Escape Artist	The Lightning League	Vehicle	9002
Spike Trike	Lightning League Scout	The Lightning League	Vehicle	9003
Quick Draw	Lightning League Weapons X-pert	The Lightning League	Vehicle	9004
Saw Boss	Monster Minds Tyrant	Monster Minds	Vehicle	9005
K.O. Kruiser	Monster Minds Demolitions X-pert	Monster Minds	Vehicle	9006
Gun Grinner	Monster Minds Enforcer	Monster Minds	Vehicle	9007
Terror Tank	Monster Minds Cannibal	Monster Minds	Vehicle	9008
Trail Blazer	Lightning League Combat Stalker	The Lightning League	Battery powered vehicle	9407
Beast Walker	Monster Minds Combat Creature	Monster Minds	Battery powered vehicle	9408
Battle Base	Lightning League Mobile Fighting Fortress	The Lightning League	Vehicle	9406
Victory Pack	Lightning League X-changeable X-tras	The Lightning League	Accessories	9403
Attack Pack	Monster Minds X-changeable X-tras	Monster Minds	Accessories	9403

Series 2 - 1986 Unreleased/prototypes
Name	Log Line	Allegiance	Type	Item number
Thunderstruction	Environment Set	The Lightning League	Carrying Case	2697
Thunderstruction Vehicle Set	Environment Set with Armed Force	The Lightning League	Carrying Case	2696
Fling Shot	Lightning League Long-range Marksman & Herc figure	The Lightning League	Vehicle	2514
Spray Gunner	Lightning League Marine Machine & Jayce Figure	The Lightning League	Vehicle	2699
Grim Creeper	Monster Minds Battle Spy	Monster Minds	Vehicle	2700
Bru-Toss	Monster Minds Hurler	Monster Minds	Vehicle	2514
Motorvator Set	Lightning League Power Pack & Jayce Figure	The Lightning League	Motorised Expansion pack	2701
Monstervator Set	Monster Minds Power Pack	Monster Minds	Motorised Expansion pack	2702
Run-A-Mut	Lightning League Zoggies	The Lightning League	Windup Pet	2078
Rev-Em-Mut	Lightning League Zoggies	The Lightning League	Windup Pet	2079
Scraps	Lightning League Zoggies	The Lightning League	Windup Pet	2800
Adventure Pack	Jayce - Lightning League Leader	The Lightning League	Figure	2447
Adventure Pack	Flora - Mischievous Tomboy	The Lightning League	Figure	2447
Adventure Pack	Oon - comical Suit of Armor	The Lightning League	Figure	2447
Adventure Pack	Gillian - Wise Wizard	The Lightning League	Figure	2447
Adventure Pack	Herc Stormsailor - Cocky Starpilot	The Lightning League	Figure	2447
Adventure Pack	Saw Boss - Monster Minds Leader	Monster Minds	Figure	2447

== Home media ==
In France, the entire series was released on two VHS box sets and later released as two DVD boxed sets by Manga Distribution. In 2014, the entire series was re-released as two DVD box sets by IDP Home Video. In America, several compilations were released on VHS in the 1980s by Magic Window, a sub-division of RCA-Columbia Pictures Home Video.

In October 2003, Sterling Entertainment released a single disc release on DVD in Region 1 entitled Escape from the Garden of Evil, which contains four episodes from the series. The DVD was re-issued by NCircle Entertainment in 2007.

Shout! Factory acquired the rights to the series in 2007 and subsequently released Jayce and the Wheeled Warriors - Volume 1, a four-disc set containing the first 33 episodes of the series, on March 25, 2008.

In 2011, Mill Creek Entertainment acquired the rights to the series. They subsequently released Jayce and the Wheeled Warriors - Volume 1, containing the first 32 episodes of the series, and a 10 episode "best of" collection on DVD in Region 1 on February 21, 2012 both include a bonus episode of C.O.P.S.. Volume 2, featuring the final 33 episodes of the series, was released on February 19, 2013. Mill Creek later released Jayce and the Wheeled Warriors - The Complete Series on DVD in Region 1 in March 2018.

DVD name	Ep #	Release date
Volume 1	32	February 21, 2012
Volume 2	33	February 19, 2013
Complete Series	65	March 14, 2018

== Comic ==
An uncredited, unfinished comic based on the series was published in the French comic magazine Pif Gadget #922. The 13-page adventure ended on a cliffhanger as the next issue did not include the follow-up story and the conclusion to that story was never published in Pif Gadget. It included characters created specifically for the comic, such as a white-haired young sorceress called Algora who was an ally of Saw Boss. The story, entitled "Le Sortilège d'Algora" ("Algora's Spell") was later re-printed and completed in Poche Junior, a free supplement for younger readers in the French television listing magazine Télé Poche, in several installments: Poche Junior #1 (May 1987), Poche Junior #2 (May 1987), Poche Junior #17 (August 1987), Poche Junior #23 (October 1987), and Poche Junior #25 (October 1987).

== See also ==
- Ginga: Nagareboshi Gin
