= Majandra Delfino =

Venezuelan-born American actress and singer

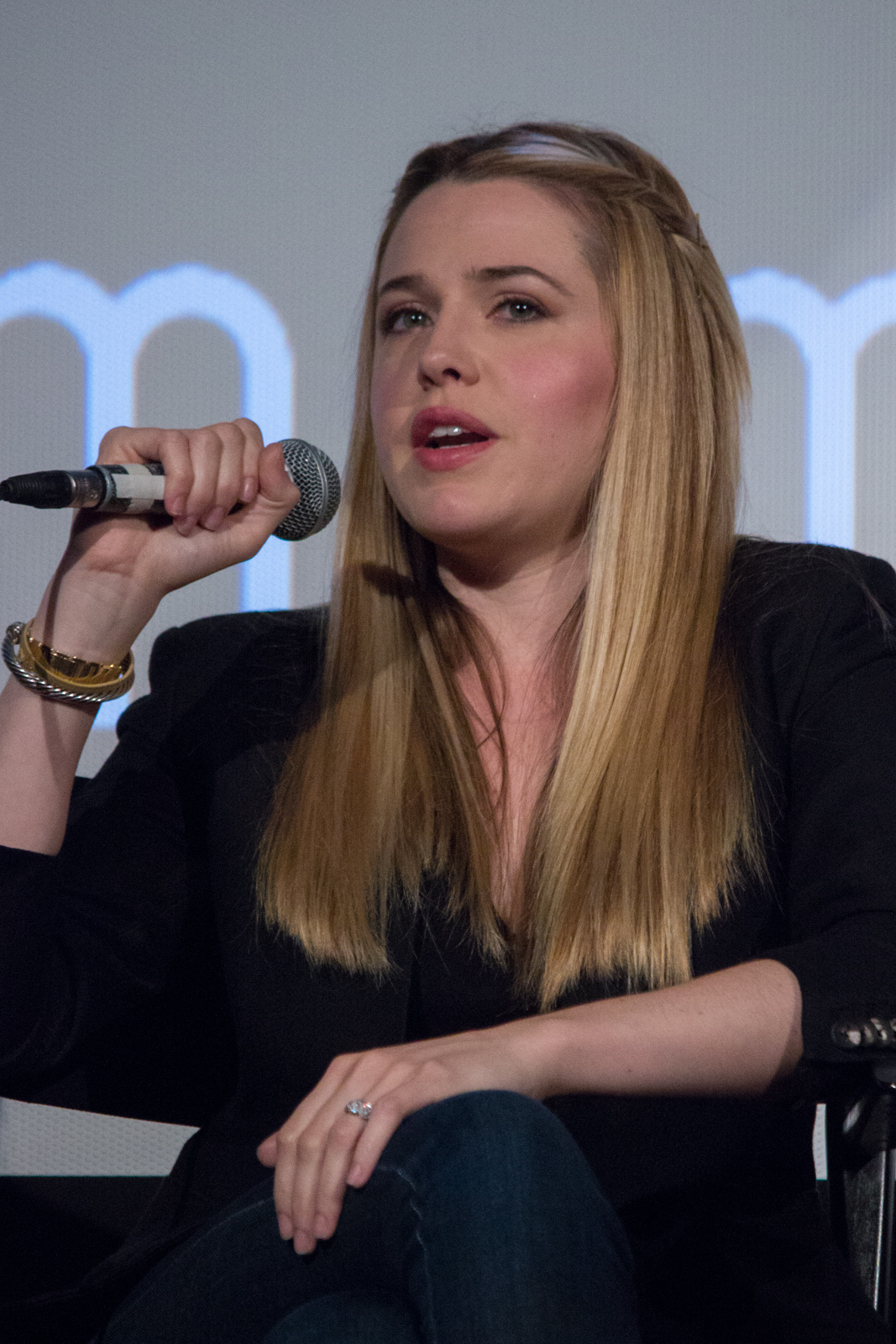
- Delfino at ATX TV Festival in June 2014
- Born: Maria Alejandra Delfino; February 20, 1981 (age 45); Caracas, Venezuela
- Occupations: Musician, singer, songwriter, actress, classical ballet, artist
- Years active: 1997–present
- Spouse: David Walton (m. 2011)
- Children: 2

Maria Alejandra Delfino (/məˈhɑːndrə dɛlˈfiːnoʊ/ mə-HAHN-drə del-FEE-noh), known professionally as Majandra Delfino, is a Venezuelan-American actress and singer. She is best known for her role as Maria DeLuca on Roswell, and as Andi on the CBS sitcom Friends with Better Lives.

== Early life ==
Delfino was born in Caracas, Venezuela. Her father, Enrique Delfino, is Italian Venezuelan, and her mother, Mary Hellmund, is Cuban. As a child, she lived in Caracas and Miami, Florida, before moving to Los Angeles as a teenager.

== Career ==
=== Acting ===
Delfino was cast in MGM's Zeus & Roxanne before winning the role of Tina Dimeo in NBC's The Tony Danza Show, where she played Danza's teenage daughter. After playing Natalie Sanford in the independent film The Secret Life of Girls, Delfino was cast as Maria DeLuca on Roswell. On hiatus, she performed in the small role of Vanessa in Traffic. She also acted in Reeseville, Celeste in the City, R.S.V.P. and State's Evidence.

Delfino starred in several episodes of the NBC show Quarterlife, also shown on MySpaceTV, which started airing November 11, 2007. In 2011, she starred with Raven-Symoné in the show State of Georgia on ABC Family until its cancellation.

Delfino performed in ABC's pilot The Family Trap starring Mandy Moore and Stockard Channing. She was eight months pregnant with her first child during the shooting, so director Shawn Levy shot around the pregnancy for the entire project. One month after giving birth, Delfino was cast as Dwight Schrute's sister, Fannie Schrute, on NBC's The Office attempted spin-off, The Farm. NBC did not greenlight the series.

Delfino starred in CBS's Friends with Better Lives, where writers included her pregnancy in the storyline.

=== Music ===
Delfino sang in several Roswell episodes, such as "Viva Las Vegas", "Cry Your Name" and "Behind the Music". In the summer of 2000, she released three songs onto the internet, "Siren", "Bruises" and "Tattoo", written and produced in association with "Sci-Fi Lullaby." On October 31, 2001, she released the EP The Sicks on her own label, Dripfeed, without radio or television airplay.

Her second album, Tarte, was released on April 23, 2007 by her own record company, Red Velvet Cake Records. In February 2011, she announced via Twitter that she was working on her third studio album, scheduled for a late 2018 release.

== Personal life ==
On March 18, 2011, Delfino married actor David Walton in Miami. They have two children, a daughter born in 2012, and a son born in 2013.

== Discography ==
- The Sicks (EP) (2001) Dripfeed
- Le Prince Bleu D'Arthelius (2003) (CD single duet with RoBERT)
- Tarte (2007) RVC Records

== Film and television credits ==
Year	Title	Role	Notes
1997	Zeus and Roxanne	Judith Dunhill	
1997–1998	The Tony Danza Show	Tina DiMeo	14 episodes
1999	The Secret Life of Girls	Natalie Sanford	
1999	Katie Joplin	Sara Shotz	7 episodes
1999–2002	Roswell	Maria DeLuca	Main role; 60 episodes
2000	Shriek If You Know What I Did Last Friday the 13th	Martina Martinez	Direct-to-video
2000	Traffic	Vanessa	
2001	The Learning Curve	Ashley	
2002	R.S.V.P.	Callie	
2003	Reeseville	Irish Buchanan	
2004	Boston Public	Jill Sharp	Episode "Chapter Seventy-Seven"
2004	Celeste in the City	Celeste Blodgett	TV movie
2005	Don't Come Knocking	1st Girl	
2006	Three Moons Over Milford	Grace Wochuck	Episode "Unaired Pilot"
2006	Ultra	Suzette	TV movie
2006	Help Me Help You	Pissed-Off Girl / Lucy	Episodes "Pilot" and "The Mattress"
2006	State's Evidence	Trudi	
2008	Heidi 4 Paws	Miss Rottenmeier	
2008	Quarterlife	Vanessa	5 episodes
2009	"Bent"	Megan	Short film
2009	Pulling	Louise	TV movie
2009	Web of Lies	Abby Turner	TV movie
2010	Life as We Know It	Jenna	
2011	Men of a Certain Age	Stella	Episodes "The Pickup" and "A League of Their Owen"
2011	State of Georgia	Josephina "Jo" Pye	Main role; 12 episodes
2012	Family Trap	Sarah	TV movie
2013	The Office	Fannie Schrute	Episode "The Farm"
2014	Friends with Better Lives	Andi Lutz	Main role
2017	Life in Pieces	Marsha	Episode "Ear Scorn Registry Manuscript"
2017	Band Aid	Maria	
2017	BoJack Horseman	Henrietta	Episode "Time's Arrow"
2025	Kill Me Again	Ana	TV movie
