= Cody McMains =

American actor

- Born: Cody Arthur McMains; Pasadena, California, U.S.
- Occupation: Actor
- Years active: 1994–2012

Cody Arthur McMains is an American actor. He is best known for playing Mitch Briggs in Not Another Teen Movie. He also appeared as Patch in Thomas & the Magic Railroad, and as Kirby in Big Bully. He was featured in the movie Bring It On in 2000. He also appeared in the TV series Monk as Mr. Monk's psychiatrist's son, Troy Kroeger, on two episodes. In addition, McMains played Keith on 10 Things I Hate About You, as well as having roles in 90210 and numerous other TV shows.

== Filmography ==
=== Film ===
Year	Title	Role	Notes
1996	Big Bully	Kirby	
1999	Tumbleweeds	Adam Riley	
1999	Impala	Will	Short film
2000	Escape to Grizzly Mountain	Rollie	
2000	Thomas and the Magic Railroad	Patch	
2000	Bring It On	Justin Shipman	
2001	Not Another Teen Movie	Mitch Briggs	
2005	Pretty Persuasion	Kenny	
2005	Madison	Bobby Epperson	
2006	State's Evidence	Brian	
2007	Freakin' Zombies, Man!	Stan Johnson	Video short
2008	Trailer Park of Terror	Jason	
2008	Christmas Break	Goldy	Short film
2009	The Intervention	Boy	
2009	Vicious Circle	Alfred	
2012	FDR: American Badass!	James	

=== Television ===
Year	Title	Role	Notes
1996	Bless This House	Hunter	Episode: "One Man's Ceiling Is Another Man's Stereo"
1996	Men Behaving Badly	Timmy	Episode: "Welcome to Jamieco"
1996	What Love Sees	Billy Holly	TV film
1997	The Pretender	Ike	Episode: "Dragon House: Part 1"
1997	The Parent 'Hood	Andy	Episode: "No Soul on Ice"
1999	Brimstone	Young Ezekiel Stone	Episode: "It's a Helluva Life"
1999	The Love Boat: The Next Wave	Justin	Episode: "Three Stages of Love"
2001	Prank Attack	Host	TV series
2002	Beyond Belief: Fact or Fiction	Darren	Episode: "Summer Camp"
2002–03	Everwood	Wendell	Recurring role
2004	Joan of Arcadia	Danny	Episode: "Back to the Garden"
2004	Cold Case	John (1979)	Episode: "Daniela"
2006	In from the Night	Tristan	TV film
2006, 2007	Monk	Troy Kroger	2 episodes: "Mr. Monk Gets a New Shrink", "Mr. Monk and the Buried Treasure"
2007	Desperate Housewives	Hector	Episode: "God, That's Good"
2007	Without a Trace	Tyler	Episode: "Two of Us"
2008	The Closer	John McFadden	Episode: "Time Bomb"
2009	Trust Me	Chip Lyons	Episode: "All Hell the Victors"
2009–10	10 Things I Hate About You	Keith	Recurring role
2009, 2010	90210	Stuart	3 episodes: "Women's Intuition", "Javianna", "Confessions"
2010	No Ordinary Family	Clerk	Episode: "No Ordinary Vigilante"
