= Giulio Kukurugya =

American actor

- Born: March 2, 1941; Coolspring Township, Pennsylvania
- Died: May 2, 2019 (aged 78); Orillia, Ontario, Canada

Julius Karl Alexander Kukurugya, better known as Giulio Kukurugya, was an American-Canadian actor.

== Career ==
Kukurugya was born in Coolspring Township, Pennsylvania.

On television, he played the voice of the villain Saw Boss on DiC Entertainment's Jayce and the Wheeled Warriors. His other roles in film and television include Instant Star, Angels in the Infield, Twice in a Lifetime, The Shooter and Night Heat.
