= Jack (1996 film) =

1996 film by Francis Ford Coppola

- Theatrical release poster
- Directed by: Francis Ford Coppola
- Written by: James DeMonaco; Gary Nadeau
- Produced by: Ricardo Mestres; Fred Fuchs; Francis Ford Coppola
- Starring: Robin Williams; Diane Lane; Jennifer Lopez; Brian Kerwin; Fran Drescher; Bill Cosby
- Cinematography: John Toll
- Edited by: Barry Malkin
- Music by: Michael Kamen
- Production companies: Hollywood Pictures; American Zoetrope; Great Oaks Entertainment
- Distributed by: Buena Vista Pictures Distribution
- Release date: August 9, 1996
- Running time: 113 minutes
- Country: United States
- Language: English
- Budget: $45 million
- Box office: $78 million

Jack is a 1996 American coming-of-age comedy-drama film co-produced and directed by Francis Ford Coppola. The film stars Robin Williams, Diane Lane, Jennifer Lopez, Brian Kerwin, Fran Drescher, and Bill Cosby. Williams plays the role of Jack Powell, a boy who ages four times faster than normal as a result of a unique medical condition.

Jack was released in the United States on August 9, 1996 by Buena Vista Pictures. The film received negative reviews from critics and grossed $78 million against a $45 million budget.

== Plot ==
During a costume party, guest Karen Powell goes into labor and is rushed to the hospital by her husband Brian and their friends. The baby, named Jack, inexplicably looks full-term and healthy despite having been born in the 10th week of gestation. Medical exams reveal that Jack suffers from a unique condition that results in him growing four times faster than normal.

Ten years later, at age 10, Jack has the body of a 40-year-old man. One day, four boys are lurking outside of his house, intrigued by rumors of a monster inhabiting it. Jack scares them away by dipping a fake eye into slime and throwing it at them from his window. Jack has grown childish due to this secluded life, having socialized only with his parents and his tutor, Lawrence Woodruff, who suggests that he attend school. Jack's parents initially reject the suggestion, fearing that school could be traumatic to him, but they eventually agree.

When he first attends school, Jack is rejected by most kids due to his appearance. His father encourages him by installing a basketball hoop to help him learn to fit in. One day, a boy named Louis picks Jack for his team to play basketball, and they win against some bullies. After school, Louis asks Jack to pose as the principal to avoid punishment from his mother, Dolores. Afterward, they become friends and Louis invites Jack to a clubhouse with the other kids, enlisting him to get adult items for them.

Jack develops his first crush on Miss Marquez, his teacher, but, when she rejects him, he becomes deeply saddened and collapses going down the stairs. At the hospital, Jack is revealed to have begun developing cardiovascular problems, a sign that he is aging. Realizing the dangers that it might entail for his health, his parents decide to withdraw him from school, which upsets him.

Jack sneaks out of the house and goes to a bar, where he gets drunk, befriends a man named Paulie, and tries to hit on Dolores. However, he gets into a fight with an angry man at the bar, and both are arrested. Dolores bails out Jack and comforts him after dropping him off at home. He locks himself in his room and does not come out for weeks. Karen speculates that Jack realized the fragility of his life and is scared of facing the outside world again.

Meanwhile, his friends continue to come to his house, hoping that he will come out and play, but he refuses. Finally, Louis lures Jack out of the house by bringing over the entire class, spending the day playing in the front yard. The next day, Jack decides to return to school.

Seven years later, an elderly-looking Jack and his four best friends are at their high-school graduation. Jack delivers the valedictorian speech, reminding those in attendance that life is short, and he encourages his classmates to make the best of it as they all head into the future.

== Cast ==
- Robin Williams as Jack Powell
- Diane Lane as Karen Powell, Jack's mother
- Jennifer Lopez as Miss Marquez
- Brian Kerwin as Brian Powell, Jack's father
- Fran Drescher as Dolores Durante
- Bill Cosby as Lawrence Woodruff
- Michael McKean as Paulie
- Don Novello as Bartender
- Allan Rich as Dr. Benfante
- Keone Young as Dr. Lin
- Al Nalbandian as Principal McGee
- Allison Whitbeck as Lucy
- Dwight Hicks as High School Principal
- Mark Coppola as Radio Personality (voice)
- Adam Zolotin as Louis Durante, Dolores's son and Jack's primary best friend
  - Michael Madland as Louis (age 18)
- Todd Bosley as Eddie
  - Matt Kroot as Eddie (age 18)
- Seth Smith as John-John
  - Tyler Smith as John-John (age 18)
- Mario Yedidia as George
  - Ryan Kennedy as George (age 18)
- Jeremy Lelliott as Johnny Duffer
  - Jesse James Chisholm as Johnny Duffer (age 18)
- Rickey D'Shon Collins as Eric
  - Jonathan A. Turner as Eric (age 18)
- Hugo Hernandez as Victor
- Jurnee Smollett as Phoebe
  - Kamela Peart as Phoebe (age 16)
- Dani Faith as Jane
  - Jennifer Hagan as Jane (age 16)
- Ben Jones as Mechanic (part cut from film)

== Production ==
Francis Ford Coppola came across the James DeMonaco and Gary Nadeau script Jack and resonated with it describing it as a "warm fable" that reminded him of his work on Peggy Sue Got Married. Coppola in particular saw parallels between the isolation and loneliness that Jack's rapid aging caused and his own childhood experience with polio as well as the grief over the short life of his son Gian-Carlo "Gio" Coppola to whom he'd dedicate the film. Coppola also voiced a desire to make a film which his then nine-year-old granddaughter, Gia, could see. Coppola and Robin Williams had been acquainted for years and had discussed off and on the possibility of them working together on a project, and Coppola felt with Williams's energy he'd be perfect for the role of a boy trapped in a man's body.

In January 1995, it was announced that Williams would star in Jack with Coppola set to direct. John Travolta was interested in playing the lead role of Jack, but due to an apology from Disney to Williams regarding royalties from Aladdin, Williams was guaranteed the role. Former Hollywood Pictures President Ricardo Mestres encouraged Disney to acquire the script in June 1994 after finding the script while on a trip to New York. In a 2025 interview with IndieWire, DeMonaco and Nadeau wrote the script together with the intention of Nadeau to direct. Following the script's acquisition by Disney, Nadeau was fired from the director's position as Williams had a directors list which included Coppola, Martin Scorsese, Barry Levinson, and Brian De Palma. DeMonaco assumed this was simply political grandstanding by Williams against Disney and that Nadau would be rehired when Williams' director choices said no with DeMonaco taken aback when Coppola said yes. While DeMonaco recalled his experience with Coppola rather fondly, a regime change saw Michael Ovitz become head of the Walt Disney Company. When Ovitz saw what Coppola was doing on Jack, he sent in studio notes to Coppola demanding the melancholy tone be enlivened and more morbid scenes excised from the film. Neither Coppola nor DeMonaco were satisfied with the final film.

== Release ==
The film was theatrically released on August 9, 1996. A home video release followed on February 4, 1997.

Jack debuted at number one at the US box office and grossed roughly $58.6 million in the United States and Canada, and $78 million worldwide, on a budget of $45 million.

== Reception ==
Review aggregator Rotten Tomatoes reports that 17% of 35 critics have given the film a positive review, with an average rating of 4.4/10. The site's critical consensus reads: "Robin Williams' childlike energy is channeled in all the wrong places with Jack, a bizarre tragedy that aims for uplift but sinks deep into queasy schmaltz." Metacritic, which uses a weighted average, assigned the film a score of 31 out of 100, based on 14 critics, indicating "generally unfavorable" reviews. Audiences surveyed by CinemaScore gave the film a grade of "B+" on a scale of A+ to F.

Todd McCarthy of Variety called it a "tedious, uneventful fantasy" that wastes the talents of the filmmakers.

=== Accolades ===
Jack was nominated for Worst Picture at the 1996 Stinkers Bad Movie Awards but lost to Striptease.

=== Response from Francis Ford Coppola and the crew ===
About the film's reception, Francis Ford Coppola said, "Jack was a movie that everybody hated and I was constantly damned and ridiculed for. I must say I find Jack sweet and amusing. I don't dislike it as much as everyone, but that's obvious—I directed it. I know I should be ashamed of it but I'm not. I don't know why everybody hated it so much. I think it was because of the type of movie it was. It was considered that I had made Apocalypse Now and I'm like a Marty Scorsese type of director, and here I am making this dumb Disney film with Robin Williams. But I was always happy to do any type of film."

First-time screenwriter Gary Nadeau wasn't quite as positive, describing his experience of seeing the initial cut of Jack as a terrifying one. “I thought my career had ended,” he admitted to The Telegraph. “Not only that, but I'd be the man who destroyed Francis Ford Coppola's career.”

== Music ==
The film's theme is "Star", performed by Canadian musician Bryan Adams.
