= Celeste in the City =

2004 television movie

Celeste in the City is a television movie starring Majandra Delfino and Nicholas Brendon. It premiered on ABC Family in 2004. It was directed by Larry Shaw.

== Plot ==
Celeste Blodgett is a somewhat unkempt young woman who moves from her small hometown to Manhattan with aspirations of becoming a journalist. Her romantic ideas about New York are quickly shattered when she discovers her new apartment is small, dirty and rat-infested. Luckily, her neighbor Kyle is an interior designer and helps her fix up the place. She obtains a job as a lowly fact checker at a newspaper called the New York Examiner and feels discouraged about her career prospects.

Celeste reconnects with her cousin Dana, who has come out as gay since moving to the city. Since Celeste looks and feels out of place, Dana and his friends give her a makeover. This helps her out romantically and in her career. She gets the chance to be a journalist and is ecstatic.

Kyle has been harboring feelings for Celeste, which she doesn't realize because she's under the false impression that he's gay due to his profession. Trying to be helpful, she sets Kyle up with Dana on a date. Kyle expresses confusion and Dana quickly figures out what happened.

Celeste eventually realizes that her boss, Mitch, was only treating her well because he was sexually attracted to her. She stands up to him and calls him on his behavior. Celeste learns that Kyle is straight and they begin a relationship.

== Cast ==
- Majandra Delfino as Celeste Blodgett
- Nicholas Brendon as Dana Harrison
- Ethan Embry as Kyle Halley
- Michael Boisvert as Mitch Tanzer
