= Gary Nadeau =

American film director and screenwriter

- Occupation(s): Film director, screenwriter
- Years active: 1994–present

Gary Nadeau is an American Film director and Screenwriter. He is best known for co-writing the screenplay for the 1996 film Jack which involves a 10-year-old boy who grows 4x faster than the normal person starring Robin Williams and directed by Francis Ford Coppola.

His first major credit was directing, editing, producing and writing the short film Red (1994). Nadeau also directed the television films Angels in the Endzone (1997) and The Jennie Project (2001). His most recent project was a short film entitled Pizza Verdi (2011).
