= Angels in the Endzone =

- Home release cover
- Directed by: Gary Nadeau
- Written by: Alan Eisenstock; Larry Mintz
- Starring: Paul Dooley; Matthew Lawrence; David Gallagher; Christopher Lloyd
- Cinematography: Ron Orieux
- Edited by: Jeff Freeman
- Music by: Frédéric Talgorn
- Production companies: Walt Disney Television; Arts & Leisure Corporation; Endzone Productions
- Distributed by: Buena Vista Television; American Broadcasting Company
- Release date: November 9, 1997
- Running time: 90 minutes
- Country: United States
- Language: English

Angels in the Endzone is a 1997 American fantasy sports film directed by Gary Nadeau and starring Christopher Lloyd. It is a sequel to the 1994 film Angels in the Outfield. The film is about a high school football team that lacks skill.

== Plot ==
The Westfield Angels high school football team is on a 54-game skid. Jesse Harper is their best player and is playing as tailback, shedding a new light for the team. However, after a terrible accident in a rainstorm in which his father Peter, a former high school football star, dies, he feels demoralized and lonely and quits the team.

On the night that Jesse quits, his younger brother Kevin confronts him telling him that football was a major part of his life and that he belongs on the team. He responds by saying that the only way he would return to the team is if they start winning.

Kevin prays to the angels to come and help the team to win some games, so that Jesse will start playing again. The next day, they come, headed by Al, the only returning character from Angels in the Outfield; Kevin is the only one who can see them, though.

Game after game after game, Westfield keep winning with the angels' help. Kevin becomes a "lucky charm" for his brother's football team, since he can tell Coach Buck what the angels need.

At the same time elsewhere, Jesse begins to associate with shady teenage bookie Bodean and his friend Tyler, who had previously profited greatly over Westfield's losses, but have since started losing money due to their angel-assisted victories. At one point, Jesse inadvertently distracts a gas station attendant with a fill-up and a window washing while Bodean robs the station's cash registers to recoup his losses as Tyler observes. Jesse soon notices the robbery in progress, but hesitates to say anything to the attendant as he pays him, and the three quickly drive off just as the attendant discovers the robbery, with Jesse accidentally leaving his wallet behind in the process. The station attendant picks up the wallet and reports the crime, and the police later encounter Jesse walking home after cutting ties with Bodean and Tyler over the robbery and, after questioning him, bring him back home. With the information he gives them, Bodean and Tyler are arrested at the championship game several days later.

The day before the championship game, Coach Buck asks Jesse to come back to play for the team, as he is retiring after this season and will be the final game he coaches. He accepts, since now he has confidence that they can win.

The climax comes on the day of the game, coincidentally between the Westfield Angels and the Central High Screaming Demons. However, Kevin is facing a slight predicament, because there is a "Heavenly Law" that angels can't help in championship games. In the end, with the game down to one last play, he motivates the team by spontaneously flapping his arms like an angel. Soon, the entire football field is filled with people doing the same thing. On Westfield's last play, Jesse starts to run for a 50-yard touchdown while remembering his father's words of advice. As Jesse scores the winning touchdown, he sees his father's spirit, and rushes over and hugs him, and soon after the team cheers and lifts him and Kevin into the air as Westfield celebrates their championship victory.

== Cast ==
- Paul Dooley as Coach Buck
- Matthew Lawrence as Jesse Harper, (RB)
- David Gallagher as Kevin Harper
- Jack Coleman as Peter Harper
- Lynda Boyd as Grace Harper
- Allan Zinyk as Assistant Coach Artie
- Christopher Lloyd as The Boss Angel aka Al
- Ken Kirzinger as Angel #1
- Ron Robinson as Angel #2
- David Paul Grove as Angel #3
- James Hibbardas Angel #4
- Kate Twa as Angel #5
- Curtis Bechdholt as Nolan (Shotgun) Bailey, (QB)
- Jason Emanuel as Kenny Kerner, (RB)
- Trevor Roberts as Hogg, (DL)
- Kevin Hansen as Albie Dabinsky
- Winston Brown as Curtis (Shack) Shackleford, (WR)/(DB)
- Sean Amsing as Garo, (PK)

== See also ==
- Angels in the Infield
- List of films about angels
