= Korby Siamis =

American television producer and writer

- Born: 1955 or 1956 (age 69–70)
- Occupation(s): Television producer and writer

Korby Siamis (born 1955/1956) is an American television producer and writer. She won a Primetime Emmy Award and was nominated for five more in the categories Outstanding Comedy Series and Outstanding Writing for her work on the television program Murphy Brown.
