= Angels in the Outfield (1994 film) =

American sports film by William Dear

- Theatrical release poster
- Directed by: William Dear
- Screenplay by: Holly Goldberg Sloan
- Based on: Angels in the Outfield; 1951 film by Dorothy Kingsley; George Wells; Richard Conlin
- Produced by: Irby Smith; Joe Roth; Roger Birnbaum
- Starring: Danny Glover; Tony Danza; Brenda Fricker; Ben Johnson; Jay O. Sanders; Christopher Lloyd
- Cinematography: Matthew F. Leonetti
- Edited by: Bruce Green
- Music by: Randy Edelman
- Production companies: Walt Disney Pictures; Caravan Pictures
- Distributed by: Buena Vista Pictures Distribution
- Release date: July 15, 1994
- Running time: 102 minutes
- Country: United States
- Language: English
- Budget: $31 million
- Box office: $50.2 million

Angels in the Outfield is a 1994 American family sports fantasy comedy-drama film directed by William Dear. It is a loose remake of the 1951 film of the same name. It stars Danny Glover, Tony Danza and Christopher Lloyd, and features several future stars, including Joseph Gordon-Levitt (in the lead), Adrien Brody, Matthew McConaughey, and Neal McDonough. Angels in the Outfield was released by Buena Vista Pictures Distribution on July 15, 1994. The film received mixed reviews from critics and grossed $50.2 million against a $31 million budget. It was followed by two made for TV sequels, Angels in the Endzone and Angels in the Infield.

== Plot ==
Young foster child Roger Bowman and his friend, J.P., enjoy sneaking into the baseball games of the California Angels.

Still in limited contact with his widowed father, Roger asks when they will be a family again. He replies sarcastically, "I'd say when the Angels win the pennant." Taking his words literally, Roger prays for God to help the Angels win. After he prays, a star, unseen by Roger, twinkles in the sky.

Then, in a game against the Toronto Blue Jays which Roger and J.P. attend, he sees a group of angels led by Al helping the team. Although Roger can see the angels quite clearly, everyone else can only explain the seemingly impossible acts as freak occurrences.

Roger's unique ability to see which players are receiving help from angels leads the Angels' skeptical manager, George "Skip" Knox (who dislikes children) to keep Roger around as a good luck charm/consultant. Due to the much-needed help, the Angels start to win games and make a surprising second-half surge to the top of their division. They have made it to the Division championship, but Roger is forced to miss the first Championship game because of a court hearing, only to find out that his father permanently gave up custody of him instead. Knowing that he had come a long way for nothing, and seeing his father leave forever, he bursts into tears.

Meanwhile, the Angels lose the first game and J.P. is crying. When Knox goes into his office, J.P. accidentally reveals to antagonistic sportscaster Ranch Wilder that Roger has the ability to see angels, and that Knox has been winning through the advice he gave him. Then, later, their caretaker, Maggie Nelson, and Roger return home at the same time Knox and J.P. do, Maggie tells Knox what happened, then he tells Roger that when he was his age he and his brothers rarely saw their father, because he couldn't take care of himself and also if Roger continues to think people would let him down, like Knox, he would dislike children when he becomes an adult.

Meanwhile, Ranch, hoping to destroy Knox informs the press of what J.P. told him and tells owner Hank Murphy who threatens to fire Knox for this seemingly absurd notion that angels are helping the team. Roger comes clean about his special ability and at a press conference they and the entire team defend Knox in front of the press. Moved by their faith, Murphy allows Knox to continue being the manager of the team and play for the championship.

At the championship game against the Chicago White Sox, none of the Angels show up to help the team. Later on, Al explains that championships must be played without help from the Angels, and that he was just checking on Knox's longtime friend Mel Clark who will be one of them soon (as he's been a smoker for years and has only six months left to live). Throughout the game, Clark has been in but is getting tired after 156 pitches. When Knox goes in, everyone thinks he's going in to take him out, but instead, he gives Clark some motivation, with help from Roger, the team, and finally, the entire audience, as well as Murphy and the broadcasters (minus Ranch).

Clark makes his pitch and after his opponent hits the ball, he dives and catches it with his glove, therefore, clinching the game and the pennant for the Angels. Knox tells him that they really didn't need the Angels' help and that Clark did it on his own, Wilder gets fired by Murphy over Wilder's insults about the Angels and Knox over the radio.

When Knox returns Roger and J.P. home, Maggie tells Roger that he must depart from her to live in a new home. J.P. is crying and gets nervous about losing him; so, he runs back to his room and Maggie goes after him. Knox then tells Roger that he called the Family Court and asked them if he would become Roger's new dad and adopt him, and they agree. Roger says he would only go if J.P. went with them. Then J.P. returns, still crying, and Knox then says that he will be living with them too, and that he will be Roger's new brother. He stops crying and runs over to them and they share a hug. J.P. wants Maggie to join them too, but she says she has to stay behind and hopefully get new angels living with her, too. J.P. turns to see Al at the window, who smiles. J.P. smiles back, and says, "I knew it could happen". Al circles around the house and says "We're always watching" and flying off into the stars, which re-enact a baseball game.

== Cast ==
- Danny Glover as George "Skip" Knox, the manager of the California Angels and adoptive father of Roger & J.P.
- Tony Danza as Mel Clark, the first pitcher of the California Angels
- Christopher Lloyd as Al the Boss Angel
- Brenda Fricker as Maggie Nelson, Roger's foster mother
- Ben Johnson as Hank Murphy, the owner of the California Angels
- Joseph Gordon-Levitt as Roger Bomman
- Jay O. Sanders as Ranch Wilder, the sportscaster & PA announcer of the California Angels
- Taylor Negron as David Montagne, the team assistant of the California Angels
- Milton Davis Jr. as J.P., Roger's friend, later younger adoptive brother
- Tony Longo as Triscuitt Messmer, the catcher of the California Angels
- Neal McDonough as Whitt Bass, the second pitcher of the California Angels
- Stoney Jackson as Ray Mitchell, the third baseman of the California Angels
- Matthew McConaughey as Ben Williams, an outfielder for the California Angels
- Adrien Brody as Danny Hemmerling, a utility player for the California Angels
- Tim Conlon as Wally, the color commentator of the California Angels
- Israel Juarbe as Jose Martinez, the second baseman of the California Angels
- Albert Alexander Garcia as Pablo Garcia, the shortstop of the California Angels
- Dermot Mulroney as Mr. Bomman, Roger's birth father
- Robert Clohessy as Frank Gates, the third pitcher of the California Angels
- Danny Walcoff as Marvin
- O.B. Babbs as Mapel, a player of the California Angels
- Mitchell Page as Abascal, the first baseman of the California Angels
- Carney Lansford as Kit "Hit or Die" Kesey, a player for the Chicago White Sox
- Bill Dear as Blue Jays Manager
- Mark Cole as Norton, an outfielder for the California Angels
- Jeff Seaberg as Popcorn Vendor
- Jonathan Proby as Miguel Scott

== Production ==
In July 1993, Caravan Pictures reached an agreement with director William Dear to helm screenwriter Holly Goldberg Sloan's remake of MGM’s 1951 baseball picture Angels in the Outfield. Unlike the original, which focused on the Pittsburgh Pirates as the team in heavenly need, the film focuses on the California Angels, who did not exist when the original was released in 1951; in addition to the name coincidence, The Walt Disney Company, which distributed the film, was a minority owner of the Angels at the time. The film did, however, premiere at the Pirates' home stadium at the time, Three Rivers Stadium in Pittsburgh.

Originally Leslie Nielsen was offered the role of Al The Boss Angel, but Nielsen was too busy with Naked Gun 33 1/3: The Final Insult and Tony Danza who played Mel Clark suggested his Taxi co-star Christopher Lloyd for the role which Lloyd accepted. Director William Dear's original choice for the role of George "Skip" Knox was Bob Hoskins, but Hoskins was deemed too short for the role, Tommy Lee Jones was also considered for the role. Danny Glover accepted the role because of not only his height but because he wanted to star in more family friendly movies because his young daughter wanted to see him in his movies. Angela Lansbury was the original choice for the role of foster caretaker Maggie Nelson because Lansbury played a similar character in Bedknobs and Broomsticks but Lansbury was too busy with Murder, She Wrote, Betty White, Bea Arthur and Joan Plowright were also considered and Brenda Fricker accepted the role. Macaulay Culkin was the original choice for the role of Roger but Culkin was deemed too popular and was also busy with Richie Rich, Thomas Ian Nicholas was also considered for the role, the role went to Joseph Gordon-Levitt because Levitt's agent wanted him in a larger role and also because prior to that, Levitt was only appearing for a brief time in several movies and TV shows. Jim Varney was the original choice for the role of Ranch Wilder but Varney's voice was too raspy for the role and the role went to Jay O. Sanders. Before Tony Danza was cast, Patrick Swayze was the original choice for the role of Mel Clark but was busy with other commitments, Christopher Reeve, John Travolta, Kelsey Grammer, Steve Guttenberg, Matthew Broderick, Michael Keaton, Rick Moranis, Robert Hays, Kevin Costner and John Ritter were also considered for the role. Jack Lemmon, Walter Matthau and Lloyd Bridges were considered for the role of Hank Murphy but the role went to Ben Johnson.

== Reception ==
Angels in the Outfield generally earned mixed reviews from critics upon release. The film has a rating of 31% on Rotten Tomatoes based on 29 reviews, with an average rating of 4.5/10. The site's consensus reads: "A queasy mishmash of poignant drama and slapstick fantasy, Angels in the Outfield strikes out as worthy family entertainment". On Metacritic, the film holds a weighted average score of 44 out of 100, based on 23 reviews, indicating "mixed or average" reviews. Audiences polled by CinemaScore gave the film an average grade of "A" on an A+ to F scale.

=== Box office ===
The film opened at #4 at the North American box office, making $8.9 million USD in its opening weekend. It went on to gross $50.2 million at the box office domestically.

=== Year-end lists ===
- Top 10 worst (not ranked) – Dan Webster, The Spokesman-Review

== Home media ==
Angels in the Outfield was released on VHS in 1995. Walt Disney Studios Home Entertainment released the film on DVD on April 23, 2002.

The film was made available for streaming on Disney+ on July 15, 2024, to coincide with the film's 30th anniversary. Additionally, the film became available for purchase and rental on digital release services, such as Amazon Instant Video and Apple TV, shortly afterwards after having never been available on such platforms.

== See also ==
- List of films about angels
- List of baseball films
