= Israel Juarbe =

American actor

- Born: Israel Juarbe; March 1, 1963 (age 63)
- Occupation: Actor
- Years active: 1983–1997

Israel Juarbe (born March 1, 1963) is an American actor most well known for portraying Jose Martinez in Angels in the Outfield and Freddy Fernandez in The Karate Kid and The Net (1995). He appeared in the Sliders episode (5/15) "To Catch a Slide" (1999).

== Filmography ==
Year	Title	Role	Notes
1982	Dreams Don't Die	Kirk	
1983	Hadley's Rebellion	Manuel Hernandez	
1984	The Karate Kid	Freddy Fernandez	
1984	Beverly Hills Cop	Room Service Waiter	
1987	Overboard	The Yacht: Engine Room Crewman	
1988	Kandyland	Lumpy	
1988	The Night Before	Attendant	
1989	Bert Rigby, You're a Fool	Bell Hop	
1993	Indecent Proposal	Citizenship Student	
1994	Angels in the Outfield	Jose Martinez	
1995	The Net	Thief	
1996	Larger than Life	Villager	
1996	Dear God	Ernesto on Scaffold	
1997	Boogie Nights	Maurice's Brother	
