= Holly Goldberg Sloan =

American novelist

- Born: Holly Goldberg; 7 August 1958 (age 68); Ann Arbor, Michigan, U.S.
- Education: Wellesley College
- Occupation: Film director; producer; novelist; screenwriter
- Spouses: Chuck Sloan (m. 1982; div. 1992); Gary A. Rosen (m. 1995)
- Children: 2
- Writing career
- Years active: 1987–present

Holly Goldberg Sloan (born 1958) is an American film director, producer, screenwriter and New York Times bestselling novelist.

== Life and career ==
Sloan was born in Ann Arbor, Michigan, to psychology professor Lewis R. Goldberg and architect mother Robin Montgomery. She spent her childhood living in California, the Netherlands, Turkey, Washington, D.C., and Eugene, Oregon. She received her undergraduate degree from Wellesley College in Massachusetts, and after working briefly at Grey Advertising in New York City, moved to Los Angeles where she sold her first screenplay at 24 years old.

Her film credits include writing Made in America (1993), and writing and producing Angels in the Outfield (1994). She was the first woman to direct a live action film for Disney when she both wrote and directed the soccer film The Big Green (1995). Sloan followed this up when she wrote and directed the independent film The Secret Life of Girls which debuted at the Seattle film Festival.

Sloan was the screenwriter on Steve Irwin's feature film for MGM The Crocodile Hunter: Collision Course (2002). She was the writer and director of the film Heidi 4 Paws (2008), which is a retelling of the children's classic story of Heidi, written by Johanna Spyri in 1880, but with live-action dogs in all of the parts. The film first aired on Public Television sponsored by Chicago Public Television station WTTW. She was the screenwriter of the 2014 Hallmark Hall of Fame Christmas movie: One Christmas Eve.

Sloan's debut novel, I'll Be There, was published by Little, Brown, and Company in the spring of 2011. Her books are currently in print from 32 publishers in 24 languages. Her second novel, Counting By 7s, was published by Dial in August 2013. It was Amazon's best book of the year for middle graders and has spent over forty weeks on the New York Times Bestseller list. A sequel to I'll Be There, titled Just Call My Name, was published on August 5, 2014. Both I'll Be There and the follow-up novel has been optioned by for a one-hour television series.

Counting By 7s was nominated for a Dorothy Canfield Fisher Book Award in 2014, and was a nominee for the Global Read Aloud Award, and was an E.B White Honor Book. In Italy, it received the Hans Christian Andersen Award in Genoa in May 2015 for best novel for children ages 12+. It has appeared on 44 state reading lists in the United States and won the best book for young readers in North Carolina, Pennsylvania and Michigan, and has sold over one million copies.

Sloan's novel Appleblossom the Possum, was published in August 2015 by Dial (Penguin Random House). It was an Amazon Best Book of the Month, and an Indie Next selection for the fall of 2018. The audiobook was read by Dustin Hoffman and features music from Ry Cooder. The book features illustrations by her husband, Gary A. Rosen, who is also a film and television writer.

Sloan's next novel was published by Dial (Penguin Random House) in January 2017. It was titled "Short" and was a New York Times bestseller and was an Indie Bookstore bestseller.

In February 2019 Sloan co-authored with Meg Wolitzer the novel To Night Owl From Dogfish. It debuted as an Indie Bookstore bestseller and has been optioned by Disney+.

Sloan's next novel published in March 2021 from Dial (Penguin Random House). It was titled "The Elephant in the Room", and published simultaneously in the U.K. by Piccadilly Press – Bonnier Books UK, who are the U.K. publishers of "Counting By 7s".

Sloan's first novel written for an adult audience, titled "Pieces of Blue", was published in May 2023 from Flatiron (Macmillan).

Rocky Pond, an imprint of Penguin Random House, published her tenth novel, "Finding Lost", in October of 2025. It was reviewed in the New York Times along with an article commemorating the 25 year anniversary of the publication of Kate DiCamillo's book "Because of Winn Dixie".
