= Angels in the Outfield (1951 film) =

1951 American comedy film

- Theatrical release poster
- Directed by: Clarence Brown
- Screenplay by: Dorothy Kingsley; George Wells
- Story by: Richard Conlin
- Produced by: Clarence Brown
- Starring: Paul Douglas; Janet Leigh
- Cinematography: Paul C. Vogel
- Edited by: Robert J. Kern
- Music by: Daniele Amfitheatrof
- Production companies: Metro-Goldwyn-Mayer; Loew's Incorporated
- Distributed by: Loew's, Inc.
- Release date: September 7, 1951 (US)
- Running time: 99 minutes
- Country: United States
- Language: English
- Budget: $1,081,000
- Box office: $1,665,000

Angels in the Outfield is a 1951 American sports comedy film produced and directed by Clarence Brown and starring Paul Douglas and Janet Leigh. Based on a story by Richard Conlin, the film is about a young woman reporter who blames the Pittsburgh Pirates' losing streak on their abusive manager, who begins hearing the voice of an angel promising to help the team if he changes his ways. The film was released by Metro-Goldwyn-Mayer on September 7, 1951. It was President Dwight D. Eisenhower's favorite film.

== Plot ==
With baseball's Pittsburgh Pirates in last place, their combative, foul-mouthed manager Guffy McGovern is upset. His abusive language toward players is publicized by local newspaper reporter Jennifer Paige, who disdains his management style.

While wandering through Forbes Field in search of his good-luck charm one night, Guffy hears the voice of an angel who was a baseball player during his mortal life. The angel represents the Heavenly Choir Nine, an angelic team of dead ballplayers, and he begins bestowing miracles upon the Pirates, but only if Guffy will stop swearing and fighting. Guffy acquiesces and, with the help of the invisible ghosts of past baseball greats, the Pirates are involved in the pennant race.

During a game, eight-year-old orphan Bridget White insists that she can see the angels helping the players. Bridget's prayers to the archangel Gabriel had prompted the baseball angel to visit Guffy. Jennifer inadvertently transforms Bridget's angelic visions into a nationwide news story, causing McGovern aggravation.

After a line drive strikes him in the head during a game, Guffy deliriously confirms Bridget's claims to the press. He falls into the hands of vengeful sportscaster Fred Bayles, who has been scheming to have Guffy banned from baseball and persuades the commissioner to investigate Guffy's fitness to lead the team.

During the pennant-deciding game, Guffy is forced to rely exclusively upon the talents of his ballplayers with no help from the angels. The angel declares that Guffy's aging pitcher Saul Hellman will soon die and join the Heavenly Choir team. Guffy goes with Hellman to pitch the deciding game, which they ultimately win. Guffy wins Jennifer's love, and they plan to adopt Bridget.

== Cast ==
- Paul Douglas as Aloysius "Guffy" McGovern
- Janet Leigh as Jennifer Paige
- Keenan Wynn as Fred Bayles
- Lewis Stone as Arnold P. Hapgood
- Spring Byington as Sister Edwitha
- Bruce Bennett as Saul Hellman
- Marvin Kaplan as Timothy Durney
- Ellen Corby as Sister Veronica
- Donna Corcoran as Bridget White
- Jeff Richards as Dave Rothberg
- John Gallaudet as Reynolds
- King Donovan as McGee
- Don Haggerty as Rube Ronson
- Paul Salata as Tony Minelli
- John McKee as Bill Baxter
- Fred Graham as "Chunk"
- James Whitmore as Angel (voice)
- Judy Nugent as Margaret (uncredited)

The film also contains short cameos of men appearing as themselves to comment on the angels, including Bing Crosby (a minority owner of the Pirates), retired baseball Hall of Famer Ty Cobb, active player Joe DiMaggio and Hollywood songwriter Harry Ruby.

Uncredited members of the real Pittsburgh Pirates include Ralph Kiner (hitting a home run and playing first base), George Strickland, Ed Fitz Gerald and George Metkovich, as well as coaches Sam Narron and Lenny Levy.

== Production ==
Father Richard F. Grady, an English professor and administrator at the University of Scranton, wrote the story as a radio comedy under the pseudonym of Richard Conlin. MGM purchased the story as a vehicle for Spencer Tracy, who was later replaced by Clark Gable. When Gable instead chose to appear in Lone Star, MGM unsuccessfully attempted to borrow James Cagney from Warner Bros. before settling on Paul Douglas. Two years earlier, Douglas had played a catcher in the baseball comedy film It Happens Every Spring.

Location filming in Pittsburgh occurred in the spring of 1951, with many baseball action shots filmed at Forbes Field, the former home of the Pittsburgh Pirates that was demolished in 1971. Several distinguishing features of the park visible in the film include the "Kiner's Korner" inner fence in left field, with the 365-feet left-field foul line marker observable on the outer wall, and the 335-feet sign on the inner fence. The other distance markers (376, 457, 436, 375 and 300) are visible in some scenes. Also visible are the flagpole and batting cage near the 457-foot marker in deep left-center field and the Barney Dreyfuss monument in straightaway centerfield. The University of Pittsburgh's Cathedral of Learning is prominent in many of the shots.

Some scenes were shot on location at Wrigley Field in Los Angeles. Although its ivy-covered outfield wall resembled that of Forbes Field, "Kiner's Korner" is conspicuous in its absence, and visible distance markers (412 feet in centerfield, 345 feet in left) are inconsistent with Forbes Field's larger dimensions. Stock footage from Comiskey Park in Chicago is also present in the film.

Although he had no background in baseball, Bruce Bennett, who portrays a veteran pitcher, had played football in the 1926 Rose Bowl and won a silver medal in the shot put at the 1928 Summer Olympics. Jeff Richards, who appears as Rothberg, had been a minor-league baseball player before becoming an actor. Fred Graham, who plays Chunk, had been a semi-pro player. Paul Salata, who portrays Tony Minelli, played professional football from 1949 to 1953.

As the Hays Code prohibited profanity in films at the time, Guffy's foul language is audio gibberish that was created by scrambling recordings of Douglas's voice.

== Release ==
The film's world premiere was held with two showings at Pittsburgh's Loew's Penn Theatre on September 7, 1951. Author Richard F. Grady, star Paul Douglas and director Clarence Brown appeared on the stage and the entire Pirates team joined them for the afternoon premiere only, as they played the St. Louis Cardinals in the evening at Forbes Field.

Grady, Douglas and Brown presented Pirates manager Billy Meyer with the film's original manuscript during a ceremony preceding a Pirates-Reds game at Forbes Field on September 6. Although the Pirates play for the National League pennant in the film, on the date of the world premiere, the real team was in seventh place with a record of 57–79, 30.5 games behind the Brooklyn Dodgers.

The film was retitled Angels and the Pirates for its 1952 release in the United Kingdom, where audiences were largely unfamiliar with baseball and would not have understood the original title.

== Reception ==
In a contemporary review for The New York Times, critic A. H. Weiler wrote: "[L]et it be said that this combination of whimsy, sports, religious faith and romance is a heart-warming and edifying amalgam which can pass the test of what is traditionally termed entertainment. ... 'Angels in the Outfield,' in short, is slight, completely unconvincing but thoroughly delightful."

The day after the film's Pittsburgh premiere, Pittsburgh Sun-Telegraph reviewer Karl Krug wrote: "Just put down 'Angels in the Outfield' as the most delightful cinematic experience in its field since 'Miracle on 34th Street,' and you will have the situation very well in hand. ... Faith and tolerance are the keynotes of Mr. Brown's wizardry with the 'Angels in the Outfield' script, which, under less sympathetic treatment, might have become very boring, indeed. You can't bring heavenly visitors to earth to help a losing baseball team win a pennant with anything less than the most delicate guidance and a grand sense of humor. ... However, baseball is simply a sounding board for this charming story, which snuggles into your heart and stays there on a tempo of human interest and a romance as refreshingly casual as it is irresistible."

On review-aggregation website Rotten Tomatoes, the film has an 83% approval rating based on six reviews, with an average rating of 7/10.

== Box office ==
According to MGM records, the film returned receipts of $1,466,000 in the U.S. and Canada and $200,000 elsewhere but recorded a net loss of $171,000.

== See also ==
- Angels in the Outfield, 1994 film
- List of films about angels
- List of baseball films
