= Sharon Stone filmography =

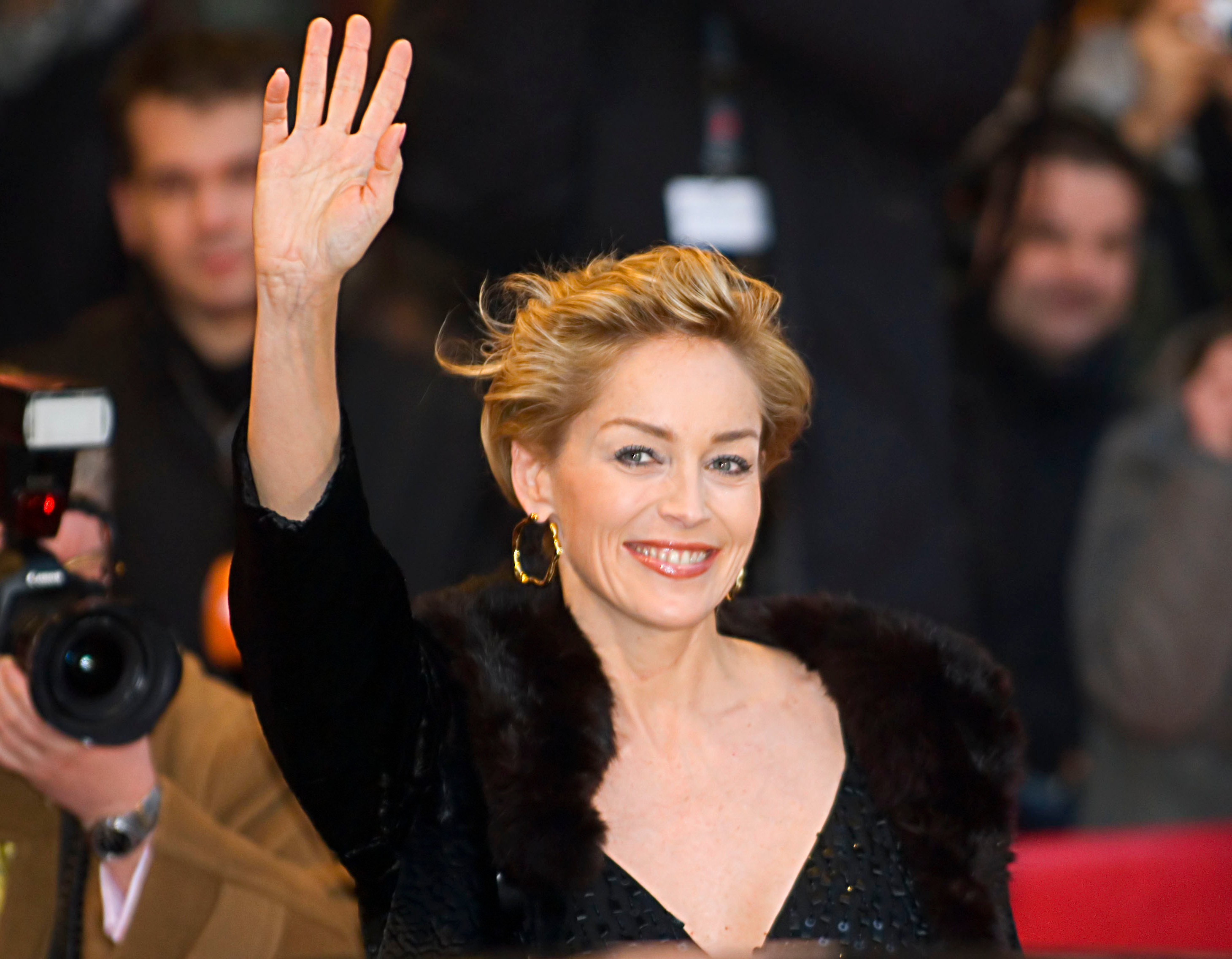
Stone at the 2007 Berlin International Film Festival

Sharon Stone is an American actress, film producer, and former fashion model. The following is a filmography of her work.

Stone came to international attention for her role in Paul Verhoeven's erotic thriller Basic Instinct. She was nominated for an Academy Award for Best Actress and won a Golden Globe Award for Best Actress in a Motion Picture Drama for her performance in Casino. She also received a Golden Globe nomination for Basic Instinct.

She has also appeared on television programs and in television films and produced several films.

== Film ==
Key
| † | Denotes works that have not yet been released |

Feature films
| Year | Title | Role | Notes |
|---|---|---|---|
| 1980 | Stardust Memories | Pretty Girl On Train | |
| 1981 | Les Uns et les Autres | Girl With Glenn Senior | Uncredited |
| 1981 | Deadly Blessing | Lana Marcus | |
| 1984 | Irreconcilable Differences | Blake Chandler | |
| 1985 | King Solomon's Mines | Jesse Huston | |
| 1986 | Allan Quatermain and the Lost City of Gold | Jesse Huston | |
| 1987 | Police Academy 4: Citizens on Patrol | Claire Mattson | |
| 1987 | Cold Steel | Kathy Connors | |
| 1988 | Above the Law | Sara Toscani | |
| 1988 | Action Jackson | Patrice Dellaplane | |
| 1989 | Beyond the Stars | Laurie McCall | |
| 1989 | Blood and Sand | Doña Sol | |
| 1990 | Total Recall | Agent Lori | |
| 1991 | He Said, She Said | Linda Metzger | |
| 1991 | Scissors | Angie Anderson | |
| 1991 | Diary of a Hitman | Kiki | |
| 1991 | Year of the Gun | Alison King | |
| 1991 | Where Sleeping Dogs Lie | Serena Black | |
| 1992 | Basic Instinct | Catherine Tramell | |
| 1993 | Sliver | Carly Norris | |
| 1993 | Last Action Hero | Catherine Tramell | Cameo |
| 1994 | Intersection | Sally Eastman | |
| 1994 | The Specialist | May Munro / Adrian Hastings | |
| 1995 | The Quick and the Dead | Ellen "The Lady" McKenzie | |
| 1995 | Casino | Ginger McKenna | |
| 1995 | Catwalk | Herself | Documentary film |
| 1996 | Diabolique | Nicole Horner | |
| 1996 | Last Dance | Cindy Liggett | |
| 1997 | Off the Menu: The Last Days of Chasen's | Herself | Documentary film |
| 1998 | Sphere | Dr. Elizabeth "Beth" Halperin | |
| 1998 | Antz | Princess Bala | Voice |
| 1998 | The Mighty | Gwen Dillon | |
| 1998 | Junket Whore | Herself | Documentary film |
| 1999 | Gloria | Gloria Swenson | |
| 1999 | The Muse | Sarah Little | |
| 1999 | Simpatico | Rosie Carter | |
| 1999 | Forever Hollywood | Narrator | Documentary film; Voice |
| 1999 | Jews and Buddhism: Belief Amended, Faith Revealed | Narrator | Documentary film; Voice |
| 2000 | Picking Up the Pieces | Candy Cowley | |
| 2000 | Beautiful Joe | Alice "Hush" Mason | |
| 2002 | Searching for Debra Winger | Herself | Documentary film |
| 2003 | Cold Creek Manor | Leah Tilson | |
| 2004 | A Different Loyalty | Sally Cauffield | |
| 2004 | Catwoman | Laurel Hedare | |
| 2004 | Jiminy Glick in Lalawood | Herself | Cameo |
| 2004 | Prajna Earth – Journey Into Sacred Nature | Narrator | Documentary film; Voice |
| 2005 | Broken Flowers | Laura Daniels Miller | |
| 2005 | Rockin' the Corps | Herself | Concert film |
| 2006 | Alpha Dog | Olivia Mazursky | |
| 2006 | Basic Instinct 2 | Catherine Tramell | |
| 2006 | Bobby | Miriam Ebbers | |
| 2007 | When a Man Falls in the Forest | Karen Fields | |
| 2007 | If I Had Known I Was a Genius | Gloria Fremont | |
| 2008 | The Year of Getting to Know Us | Jane Rocket | |
| 2008 | No Subtitles Necessary: Laszlo & Vilmos | Herself | Documentary film |
| 2008 | Five Dollars a Day | Dolores Jones | |
| 2009 | Streets of Blood | Nina Ferraro | |
| 2010 | The Invocation | Narrator | Documentary film; Voice |
| 2011 | Largo Winch II | Diane Francken | |
| 2012 | Border Run | Sofie Talbert | |
| 2013 | Lovelace | Dorothy Boreman | |
| 2013 | Femme | Herself | Documentary film |
| 2013 | Fading Gigolo | Dr. Parker | |
| 2013 | Gods Behaving Badly | Aphrodite | |
| 2014 | Love in Vegas | Angela Blake | |
| 2014 | Dior and I | Herself | Documentary film |
| 2014 | Un ragazzo d'oro | Ludovica Stern | |
| 2015 | Mindfulness: Be Happy Now | Herself | Documentary film |
| 2015 | Life on the Line | Mother | |
| 2016 | Savva: Heart of the Warrior | Puffy | Voice: English dub |
| 2016 | Harry Benson: Shoot First | Herself | Documentary film |
| 2016 | Mothers and Daughters | Nina | |
| 2016 | Jewel's Catch One | Herself | Documentary film |
| 2017 | Running Wild | Meredith Parish | |
| 2017 | All I Wish | Senna Berges | |
| 2017 | The Disaster Artist | Iris Burton | |
| 2018 | The Cure | Herself | Documentary film |
| 2018 | We the People | Herself | Documentary film |
| 2018 | This Changes Everything | Herself | Documentary film |
| 2019 | Rolling Thunder Revue: A Bob Dylan Story by Martin Scorsese | The Beauty Queen | Pseudo-documentary film |
| 2019 | The Laundromat | Hannah | |
| 2019 | House of Cardin | Herself | Documentary film |
| 2019 | That Click | Herself | Documentary film |
| 2021 | Here Today | Herself / Iris | |
| 2022 | Beauty | Colonizer | |
| 2023 | Milano – The Inside Story of Italian Fashion | Herself | Documentary film |
| 2024 | What About Love | Linda Tarlton | |
| 2024 | The Trainer | Herself | |
| 2025 | Nobody 2 | Lendina | |
| 2026 | In Memoriam | Vicky Cash | |
| 2026 | Babies | Susan | |
| TBA | Speed-the-Plow † | Gemma Speed | Post-production |

Short films
| Year | Title | Role | Notes |
|---|---|---|---|
| 1999 | Basic Insect | Princess Bala | Voice; Uncredited |
| 2007 | Democrazy | Patricia Hill | |
| 2012 | The American Tetralogy | The Shepherd's Star | |
| 2012 | Raise My Hands | Hands / Herself | |
| 2014 | Scorsese's Women | Scarface / Victim | |
| 2016 | An Undeniable Voice | Herself | Documentary film |

== Television ==
Television feature films
| Year | Title | Role | Notes |
|---|---|---|---|
| 1982 | Not Just Another Affair | Lynette | |
| 1984 | Calendar Girl Murders | Cassie Bascomb | |
| 1984 | The Vegas Strip War | Sarah Shipman | |
| 1986 | Mr. and Mrs. Ryan | Ashley Hamilton Ryan | |
| 1988 | Badlands 2005 | Alex Neil | |
| 1988 | Tears in the Rain | Casey Cantrell | |
| 1993 | The Roots of Roe | Angela Heywood | Voice |
| 1999 | The Sissy Duckling | Narrator | Voice |
| 2000 | If These Walls Could Talk 2 | Fran | |
| 2000 | Beyond the Summit | Narrator | Documentary film; Voice |
| 2012 | Sunset Strip | Herself | Documentary film |
| 2017 | Into the Night: Portraits of Life and Death | Narrator | Documentary film; Voice |
| 2023 | Albert Brooks: Defending My Life | Herself | Documentary film |

Television series
| Year | Title | Role | Notes |
|---|---|---|---|
| 1978 | Grease Live On Broadway | Grease Model | Television trailer |
| 1982 | Silver Spoons | Debbie | Episode: "A Little Magic" |
| 1983 | Remington Steele | Jillian Montague | Episode: "Steele Crazy After All These Years" |
| 1983 | Bay City Blues | Cathy St. Marie | Episode: "Pilot" |
| 1983 | Les Uns et les Autres | Girl with Glenn Senior | Uncredited |
| 1983 | Bay City Blues | Cathy St. Marie | 3 episodes |
| 1984 | The New Mike Hammer | Julie Eland | Episode: "Shots in the Dark" |
| 1984 | Bay City Blues | Cathy St. Marie | 4 episodes |
| 1984 | Magnum, P.I. | Diane Dupres / Deirdre Dupres | 3 episodes |
| 1985 | T. J. Hooker | Dani Starr | Episode: "Hollywood Starr" |
| 1988–1989 | War and Remembrance | Janice Henry | 8 episodes |
| 1992 | Saturday Night Live | Herself (host) | Episode: "Sharon Stone/Pearl Jam" |
| 1994 | The Larry Sanders Show | Herself | Episode: "The Mr. Sharon Stone Show" |
| 1995 | Roseanne | Trailer Park Resident | Episode: "Happy Trailers" |
| 1999 | Happily Ever After: Fairy Tales for Every Child | Henny Penny | Voice; Episode: "Henny Penny" |
| 2001–2002 | Harold and the Purple Crayon | Narrator | Voice; 14 episodes |
| 2003 | The Practice | Sheila Carlisle | 3 episodes |
| 2005 | Higglytown Heroes | Nikki The Blind Art Teacher | Voice; Episode: "Twinkle's Masterpiece/The Egg-cellent Adventure" |
| 2005 | Will & Grace | Dr. Georgia Keller | Episode: "The Blonde Leading the Blind" |
| 2005 | Kurtlar Vadisi | Lisa | 2 episodes |
| 2006 | Huff | Dauri Rathburn | 3 episodes |
| 2010 | Law & Order: Special Victims Unit | Assistant District Attorney Jo Marlowe | 4 episodes |
| 2015 | Agent X | Vice President Natalie Maccabee | 10 episodes |
| 2018 | Mosaic | Olivia Lake | 6 episodes |
| 2019 | Better Things | Reiki Davis | Episode: "Nesting" |
| 2020 | Ratched | Lenore Osgood | 4 episodes |
| 2020 | The New Pope | Herself | Episode #1.5 |
| 2022 | Murderville | Herself | Episode: "Heartless" |
| 2022 | The Flight Attendant | Lisa Bowden | 3 episodes |
| 2023 | Saturday Night Live | Femme Fatale / Herself | Episode: "Aubrey Plaza/Sam Smith"; Uncredited |
| 2024 | Elizabeth Taylor: Rebel Superstar | Herself | Documentary series; 3 episodes |
| 2026 | Euphoria | Patricia Lance | 5 episodes |
| 2026 | It's Florida, Man | The Dolphin | Voice, 1 episode |

== Music videos ==
| Year | Artist | Title | Role | Notes |
|---|---|---|---|---|
| 1993 | UB40 | "(I Can't Help) Falling in Love with You" | Carly Norris | Archival footage from the 1993 film Sliver |
| 1993 | Enigma | "Carly's Song" | Carly Norris | Archival footage from the 1993 film Sliver |
| 1994 | Gloria Estefan | "Turn the Beat Around" | May Munro / Adrian Hastings | Archival footage from the 1994 film The Specialist |
| 1998 | Sting | "The Mighty" | Gwen Dillon / Princess | Also archival footage from the 1998 film The Mighty |
| 2005 | Various Artists | "Come Together Now" | Herself | |
| 2006 | Johnny Cash | "God's Gonna Cut You Down" | Herself | |
| 2012 | Delleile Ankrah | "Teach Me How to Dream" | The Queen | |
| 2022 | Ibrahim Maalouf | "Our Flag" | Herself | |
| 2023 | Rita Ora | "You Only Love Me" | Herself | |
| 2024 | Orville Peck & Beck | "Death Valley High" | Herself | |

== Commercials ==
| Year | Title | Role | Notes |
|---|---|---|---|
| 1981 | Maybelline: New Slim Tint Lip Gloss | Maybelline Model | |
| 1982 | Coppertone | Coppertone Model | |
| 1982 | Finesse: Sometimes You Need | Finesse Model | |
| 1982 | Braun: Hair of the Gods | Braun Model | |
| 1983 | Charlie | Charlie | |
| 1984 | Diet Coke: Caffeine Free | Diet Coke Model | |
| 1986 | Seagram's: At a Bar | Seagram's Model | |
| 1987 | 3M: Buf Puf | 3M Model | |
| 1988 | Alcon: Opti-Zyme | Alcon Model | |
| 1988 | Camellia Diamond | Camellia Model | |
| 1990 | Diet Sprite: Changes on a Train | Sprite Model | |
| 1990 | Clairol: Nice and Easy | Clairol Model | |
| 1992 | Freixenet: Burbujas de Navidad | Herself | |
| 1993 | Pirelli: Driving Instinct | Herself | |
| 1995 | Sundae Kibon: Basic Ice Cream | Herself | |
| 1996 | E Max | Herself | |
| 1999 | Martini: There's a Party | Herself | |
| 1999 | Vernal: Face Soap | Vernal Model | |
| 2000 | Banca 121: Fans | Banca 121 Model | |
| 2000 | Banca 121: Basketball | Banca 121 Model | |
| 2000 | El Corte Inglés: Protagonista la Moda | Herself | |
| 2003 | AOL: Welcome to the World Wide WOW | Herself | |
| 2003 | I Am a Stroke | Herself | American Stroke Association |
| 2004 | William Lawson's: Scottish Instinct | William Lawson's Model | |
| 2005 | Dior: Capture Totale | Herself | |
| 2006 | Dior: Capture Totale | Herself | |
| 2007 | Vanity Fair: Killers Kill, Dead Men Die | The Society Dame | |
| 2010 | Dior: One Essential | Herself | |
| 2012 | Sharon Stone by Thierry De Goues | Outlaw | French Revue de Modes |
| 2015 | Afflelou: Moi c'est Afflelou | Herself | |
| 2015 | Airfield: Le Papillon | Airfield Model | |
| 2016 | Airfield: Fashion Is a Lovestory | Airfield Model | |
| 2016 | Afflelou: Win-Win | Herself | |
| 2017 | Afflelou: Tchin-Tchin Progressif | Herself | |
| 2018 | Afflelou: Smart Tonic | Herself | |
| 2020 | Desert Rose | Herself | |
| 2022 | LensCrafters: Because Sight | Herself | |
| 2022 | Slotomania: Captain SlotoStar | Captain SlotoStar | |
| 2022 | Dolce & Gabbana: Devotion | Herself | |

== Museum ==
Film installations
| Year | Title | Role | Notes |
|---|---|---|---|
| 2010 | The Clock | Ellen "The Lady" McKenzie / Leah Tilson | Archival footage from the 1995 film The Quick and the Dead and from the 2003 film Cold Creek Manor |

== See also ==
- List of awards and nominations received by Sharon Stone
