= List of awards and nominations received by Sharon Stone =

Sharon Stone awards and nominations
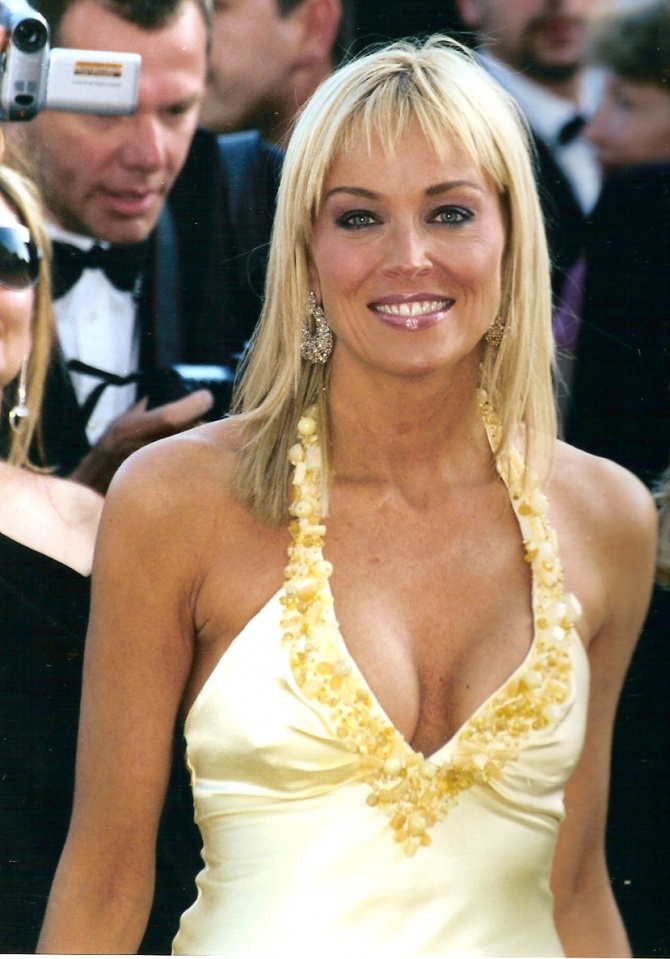
- Stone at the 2005 Cannes Film Festival
Awards and nominations
Award	Wins	Nominations
Academy Awards	0	1
Broadcast Film Critics Association Awards	0	1
Chicago Film Critics Association Awards	0	2
Dallas-Fort Worth Film Critics Association Awards	0	1
Emmy Awards	1	1
Golden Globe Awards	1	4
Golden Raspberry Awards	3	10
Hollywood Film Awards	1	1
MTV Movie Awards	2	7
Saturn Awards	0	2
Satellite Awards	1	1
Screen Actors Guild Awards	0	2
Stinkers Bad Movie Awards	2	8
Women Film Critics Circle Awards	0	1

Totals (Note: Certain award groups do not simply award one winner. They acknowledge several different recipients, have runners-up, and have third place. Since this is a specific recognition and is different from losing an award, runner-up mentions are considered wins in this award tally. For simplification and to avoid errors, each award in this list has been presumed to have had a prior nomination.)
- Wins: 11
- Nominations: 42

American actress Sharon Stone has won 11 awards from 42 nominations, including one Emmy Award, one Golden Globe Award, two MTV Movie Awards, and one Satellite Award. She has also received several "dishonors" for poor performances in films, earning three Golden Raspberry Awards, and two Stinkers Bad Movie Awards.

Stone's breakout role as Catherine Tramell in Basic Instinct (1992) earned her a Chicago Film Critics Association Award, Golden Globe Award, and Saturn Award nominations. This was followed by two nominations for MTV Movie Award for Most Desirable Female for the films Sliver (1993) and The Specialist (1994). For her role as Ginger McKenna in Casino (1995), she won the Golden Globe Award for Best Actress in a Motion Picture – Drama and received an Academy Award nomination, in the Best Actress category. She guest starred as an attorney who believes she can communicate with God in The Practice (1997–2004), a role that earned her the Primetime Emmy Award for Outstanding Guest Actress in a Drama Series. In Basic Instinct 2 (2006), her return to the character Tramell received mixed critical reviews, and garnered her a Golden Raspberry Award.

Stone has also received a number of non-performance honors. She was inducted to the Hollywood Walk of Fame in 1995 for her contribution to acting. The actress was nominated for Golden Apple Award for being easy to work with according to her co-stars. In 2005, she was named Officer of the Order of Arts and Letters in France (Commander in 2021). She received recognition at the 2006 Women Film Critics Circle Awards for her collaborations with AmfAR with their research on AIDS.

== Awards and nominations ==
Award	Year of ceremony	Nominee/work	Category	Result	Ref(s)
Academy Awards	1996	Casino	Best Actress	Nominated	
Broadcast Film Critics Association Awards	2007	Bobby	Best Acting Ensemble	Nominated	
Chicago Film Critics Association Awards	1993	Basic Instinct	Best Actress	Nominated	
Chicago Film Critics Association Awards	1996	Casino	Best Actress	Nominated	
Dallas-Fort Worth Film Critics Association Awards	1996	Casino	Best Actress	3rd Place	
Golden Globe Awards	1993	Basic Instinct	Best Actress – Motion Picture Drama	Nominated	
Golden Globe Awards	1996	Casino	Best Actress – Motion Picture Drama	Won	
Golden Globe Awards	1999	The Mighty	Best Supporting Actress – Motion Picture	Nominated	
Golden Globe Awards	2000	The Muse	Best Actress – Motion Picture Comedy or Musical	Nominated	
Golden Raspberry Award	1988	Allan Quatermain and the Lost City of Gold	Worst Actress	Nominated	
Golden Raspberry Award	1993	Basic Instinct	Worst New Star	Nominated (Note: Was nominated as "Sharon Stone's 'Tribute to Theodore Cleaver'")	
Golden Raspberry Award	1994	Sliver	Worst Actress	Nominated	
Golden Raspberry Award	1995	Intersection & The Specialist	Worst Actress	Won	
Golden Raspberry Award	1995	The Specialist	Worst Screen Combo	Won (Note: Tied with Tom Cruise and Brad Pitt in Interview with the Vampire)	
Golden Raspberry Award	1997	Diabolique & Last Dance	Worst New Star	Nominated (Note: Was nominated as the 'new serious' Sharon Stone.)	
Golden Raspberry Award	2000	Gloria	Worst Actress	Nominated	
Golden Raspberry Award	2005	Catwoman	Worst Supporting Actress	Nominated	
Golden Raspberry Award	2005	Catwoman	Worst Screen Couple (Note: Halle Berry received the nomination for her performance with either Stone or Benjamin Bratt in the film.)	Nominated	
Golden Raspberry Award	2007	Basic Instinct 2 (Note: The film was retitled Basically, It Stinks, Too! for the award ceremony.)	Worst Actress	Won	
Hollywood Film Awards	2006	Bobby	Ensemble of the Year	Won	
MTV Movie Award	1993	Basic Instinct	Most Desirable Female	Won	
MTV Movie Award	1993	Basic Instinct	Best Female Performance	Won	
MTV Movie Award	1993	Basic Instinct	Best On-Screen Duo	Nominated	
MTV Movie Award	1994	Sliver	Most Desirable Female	Nominated	
MTV Movie Award	1995	The Specialist	Most Desirable Female	Nominated	
MTV Movie Award	1996	Casino	Best Female Performance	Nominated	
Primetime Emmy Awards	2004	The Practice: Season 8	Outstanding Guest Actress in a Drama Series	Won	
Satellite Awards	2019	Mosaic	Best Supporting Actress in a Series, Miniseries or Television Film	Won	
Saturn Award	1993	Basic Instinct	Best Actress	Nominated	
Saturn Award	1996	The Quick and the Dead	Best Actress	Nominated	
Screen Actors Guild Award	2007	Bobby	Outstanding Performance by a Cast in a Motion Picture	Nominated	
Stinkers Bad Movie Awards	1993	Sliver	Worst Actress	Won	
Stinkers Bad Movie Awards	1994	Intersection & The Specialist	Worst Actress	Won	
Stinkers Bad Movie Awards	1998	Sphere	Worst Actress	Nominated	
Stinkers Bad Movie Awards	1998	Sphere	Worst On-Screen Hairstyle	Nominated	
Stinkers Bad Movie Awards	1999	Gloria & The Muse	Worst Actress	Nominated	
Stinkers Bad Movie Awards	1999	Gloria & The Muse	Worst On-Screen Female Hairstyle	Nominated	
Stinkers Bad Movie Awards	1999	Gloria	Worst Fake Accent	Nominated	
Stinkers Bad Movie Awards	2005	Catwoman	Worst Supporting Actress	Nominated	
Stinkers Bad Movie Awards	2006	Basic Instinct 2	Worst Actress	Nominated	
Women Film Critics Circle Awards	2013	Lovelace	Film That Most Passionately Opposes Violence Against Women	Nominated	

== Other honors ==
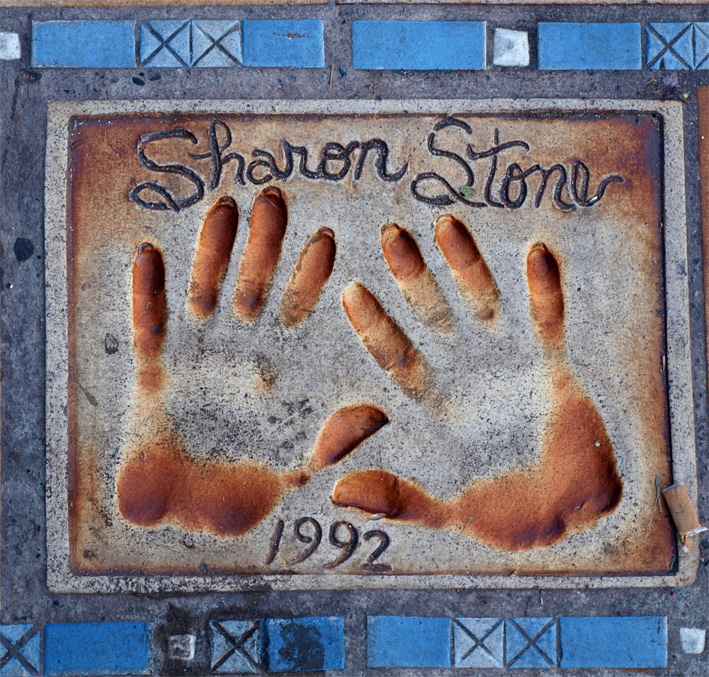
Sharon Stones fingerprint at the Cannes Walk Of Fame (Chemin des étoiles)

Throughout her career, Stone has received several other awards for her work in film. In 1992, she won the Bravo Otto silver medal in the Best Actress category. She was given a star on the Hollywood Walk of Fame in 1995 for her contribution to motion pictures. It is located at 6925 Hollywood Blvd. Stone received the Hamptons International Film Festival award for Outstanding Achievement in Acting in 2009. The actress was also awarded the Women in Film Crystal + Lucy Awards in 1995 and 2000. She also won the Karlovy Vary International Film Festival Special Prize for Outstanding Contribution to World Cinema in 2005, and an honorary award at the Marrakech International Film Festival in 2013 as part of a tribute to her career. The AARP Movies for Grownups Awards, which recognizes contributions to film by actors over the age of fifty, honored Stone with a Career Achievement Award in 2012. In 2021, Stone received the Golden Icon Award at the Zurich Film Festival for her acting career.

Stone has also been awarded for activities other than acting. In 1996, she was nominated for the Golden Apple Award for being easy to work with according to her co-stars. On May 20, 2005, she was named Officer of the Order of Arts and Letters in France (Commander on 16 July 2021). She received recognition at the 2006 Women Film Critics Circle Awards for her collaborations with AmfAR on their research on AIDS. On October 23, 2013, Stone received the Peace Summit Award for her work with HIV/AIDS sufferers. In 2015, Stone was guest of honor at the Pilosio Building Peace Award in Milan. She began an impromptu auction on stage in front of a crowd of CEOs from the construction industry and other dignitaries, gaining enough pledges to build 28 schools in Africa.

The Kyiv Museum of Wax Figures included a Sharon Stone wax figure. It is modeled after the scene in Basic Instinct in which she uncrosses her legs and exposes her genitalia during a police interrogation. Yevhen and Oleksy Sazhyn, the father and son running the museum, reported that the design process for the figure took eight months. They found sculptures based on women were more difficult to plan than those on men. For the creation of the Sharon Stone figure, they said: "capturing her legs in just the right position was tricky business".
