= Casey Silver =

American film executive and producer (born 1955)

Casey Silver (born Andrew Silver; May 5, 1955) is an American film executive and producer. Formerly the chairman and chief executive officer of Universal Pictures, he began his career in the motion picture industry as a screenwriter. After serving as an assistant to director Adrian Lyne on Flashdance, he became the director of development and production for Simpson-Bruckheimer Productions, where he was instrumental in the development of the original Beverly Hills Cop and Top Gun.

In his role at Universal, Silver was responsible for all divisions of Universal Pictures including its production, marketing and distribution operations. He supervised all activities worldwide concerning Universal's partnerships with United International and domestic distribution activities through its partnership with October Films. Additionally, Silver was in charge of Universal Studios Home Video, Universal Pictures Animation and Visual Effects, and Universal Family & Home Entertainment Production which included Universal Cartoon Studios.

During his tenure at Universal, the studio developed, produced and released the award winning films Schindler's List, Shakespeare in Love, Apollo 13, Casino, Jurassic Park, Out of Sight, Field of Dreams, Twelve Monkeys, In the Name of the Father, Do the Right Thing, Scent of a Woman, Born on the Fourth of July, Dazed and Confused, Midnight Run, American Pie, and Gladiator.

Prior to joining Universal, Silver was the vice president of production for TriStar Pictures and then promoted to senior vice president of production. He served as executive producer on Netflix's first original limited series Godless, a seven-part series from screenwriter and director Scott Frank. Nominated for eleven Primetime Emmy Awards, the series won in three categories including both the Best Supporting Actress and Actor categories for Merritt Wever and Jeff Daniels respectively. Godless aired on Netflix in 2017.

Through his own company, Casey Silver Productions, Silver produced The Highwaymen starring Kevin Costner, Hidalgo starring Viggo Mortensen, Ladder 49 starring Joaquin Phoenix, Leatherheads starring George Clooney, and The Forbidden Kingdom starring Jackie Chan. Silver is also a founding member and CEO of the start-up PodOp. The company's first transmedia project, Mosaic, was executive produced by Silver. Directed by Steven Soderbergh and starring Sharon Stone, Mosaic aired on HBO in 2017. In 2021, Silver completed production on Steven Soderbergh's No Sudden Move for HBO Max. The cast includes Don Cheadle, Benicio del Toro, and Brendan Fraser.

== Filmography ==
He was a producer in all films unless otherwise noted.

=== Film ===
Year	Film
2003	Gigli
2004	Hidalgo
2004	Ladder 49
2008	Leatherheads
2008	The Forbidden Kingdom
2019	The Highwaymen
2021	No Sudden Move
2025	Black Bag

Miscellaneous crew

Year	Film	Role
1980	Foxes	Production assistant
1982	Movie Madness	Production assistant
1983	Flashdance	Assistant: Adrian Lyne
2008	The Forbidden Kingdom	Presenter

Thanks

Year	Film	Role
1998	The Mighty	Thanks
1998	Shakespeare in Love	Thanks

=== Television ===
Year	Title	Credit
2017	Godless	Executive producer
2018	Mosaic	Executive producer
2018	Curious George	Line producer

Thanks

Year	Title	Role	Notes
1997	Obsessed with Vertigo	Thanks	Documentary
