= Sliver (film) =

1993 film by Phillip Noyce

- Theatrical release poster
- Directed by: Phillip Noyce
- Screenplay by: Joe Eszterhas
- Based on: Sliver (1991 novel) by Ira Levin
- Produced by: Robert Evans
- Starring: Sharon Stone; William Baldwin; Tom Berenger; Martin Landau
- Cinematography: Vilmos Zsigmond
- Edited by: Richard Francis-Bruce; William Hoy
- Music by: Howard Shore
- Production company: Paramount Pictures
- Distributed by: Paramount Pictures
- Release dates: May 19, 1993 (Westwood, premiere); May 21, 1993 (U.S.)
- Running time: 107 minutes
- Country: United States
- Language: English
- Budget: $40 million
- Box office: $123.9 million

Sliver is a 1993 American erotic thriller film directed by Phillip Noyce from a screenplay by Joe Eszterhas, and starring Sharon Stone, William Baldwin, and Tom Berenger. Based on Ira Levin's 1991 novel, the film is about the mysterious occurrences in a privately owned New York high-rise sliver building.

Because of a major battle with the MPAA (which originally gave the film an NC-17 rating), the filmmakers were forced to make extensive reshoots before release which necessitated changing the killer's identity.

The film was released theatrically on May 21, 1993, by Paramount Pictures. It topped the U.S. box office despite underperforming and was a huge hit in the international market. Despite a negative critical reception, Sliver, like many erotic thrillers of the time, found greater success in the home video market and was the 8th most rented film in the United States for 1994.

== Plot ==
Carly Norris, a beautiful book editor and divorcee in her mid-30s, moves into the exclusive New York City sliver building "113". She meets other tenants including Zeke Hawkins, a video game designer; Jack Landsford, a novelist; Vida Warren, a fashion model who moonlights as a call girl; and Gus Hale, a professor of videography at New York University. They tell Carly that she bears a striking resemblance to Naomi Singer, the previous tenant of her apartment who fell to her death from her balcony.

After running into Zeke numerous times, Carly invites him to her housewarming party. Soon afterwards, they begin a sexual relationship. Meanwhile, Jack stalks Carly and warns her about Zeke, who he says is "sick". He also points out that Zeke's deceased mother, a soap opera actress named Thea Manning, bears a resemblance to Carly. As Jack's behavior becomes more erratic, Gus dies in the shower under suspicious circumstances. Vida is murdered in the stairwell, and Carly discovers Jack crouched over her body. Jack is arrested.

Zeke reveals to Carly that he is the owner of 113, which he bought with an inheritance from his wealthy father. As owner of 113, Zeke has installed a comprehensive video and audio surveillance system throughout the building, allowing him to spy on all of the tenants from his own secret surveillance room.

While out on bail, Jack ambushes Carly in her apartment to warn her about Zeke. When Zeke arrives, Jack confronts him with a gun. During a struggle, Carly grabs the gun and accidentally shoots Jack.

Suspicious of Zeke, she discovers where he has hidden several tapes and a gun. She watches tapes of his liaisons with Vida and Naomi where Zeke repeats the same things he said to Carly. A horrified Carly holds Zeke off with his gun while he professes his love for her. The tape of Naomi keeps playing and reveals Jack threw her off the balcony. Carly shoots up Zeke's surveillance room and tells him to "get a life".

== Cast ==
- Sharon Stone as Carly Norris
- William Baldwin as Zeke Hawkins
- Tom Berenger as Jack Landsford
- Polly Walker as Vida Warren
- Colleen Camp as Judy Marks
- Amanda Foreman as Samantha Moore
- Martin Landau as Alex Parsons
- Nicholas Pryor as Peter Farrell
- C. C. H. Pounder as Lieutenant Victoria Hendrix
- Nina Foch as Evelyn McEvoy
- Keene Curtis as Gus Hale
- Anne Betancourt as Jackie Kinsella
- Tony Peck as Martin Kinsella
- Allison Mackie as Naomi Singer
- Jim Beaver as Detective Ira
- Jose Rey as Detective Corelli
- Victor Brandt as Detective McCracken
- Ryan Cutrona as Detective Ennis
- Robert Miano as Detective Howard
- Steve Eastin as Detective Phillip
- Sandy Gutman as Ted Weisberger
- Radu Gavor as Dmitri
- Matthew Faison as Mr. Ballinger
- Robin Groves as Mrs. Ballinger
- Marnette Patterson as Joanie Ballinger
- Sid McCoy as Mr. Anderson
- Wendy Cutler as Ms. Colson
- Melvyn Kinder as Dr. Palme
- Gilbert Rosales as Rodriguez

== Production ==
=== Development and casting ===
Michelle Pfeiffer, Julia Roberts and Meryl Streep were all considered for the role of Carly Norris. Sharon Stone originally passed on the role, until Joe Eszterhas (who previously worked with her on Basic Instinct) rewrote the script to tailor it to her. Stone didn't officially commit until shortly before the start of production, when Evans bluffed her by claiming that Geena Davis (who was nearly cast in Basic Instinct) had agreed to take the role.

Stephen Frears was originally attached to direct.

=== Filming ===
For Zeke's surveillance room, a second unit spent six weeks shooting 250,000 feet of film to be used as footage of the various tenants.

==== Locations ====
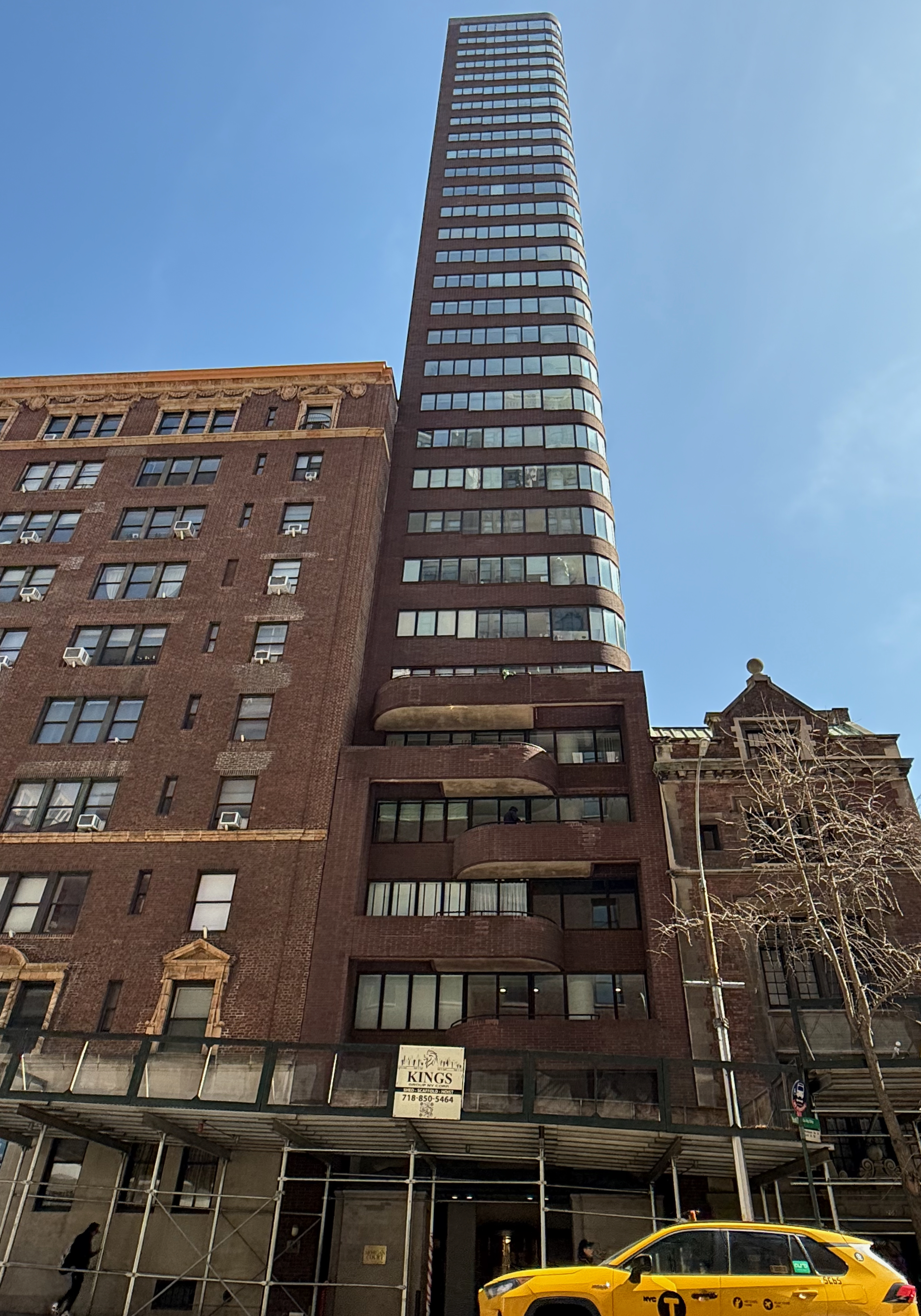
Morgan Court, a sliver building at 211 Madison Ave in New York City, used as the filming location

In the film, the tall and narrow sliver building is located at 113 East 38th Street in Manhattan, placing it at 38th Street and Park Avenue. The actual building used in the film is known as Morgan Court, located at 211 Madison Avenue in New York, one block west and two blocks south of the fictional address. The building has since become a condominium development. It was built in 1985 and has 32 floors. While the movie made use of the building's courtyard, the lobby was a set at Paramount's studios in Los Angeles.

==== Allegations about Robert Evans' behavior ====
In her 2021 memoir The Beauty of Living Twice, Stone stated—without naming names—that a producer had once told her to sleep with a costar in a film. In 2024, being interviewed for The Louis Theroux Podcast, Stone revealed the producer to be Robert Evans and specified that his suggestion had occurred during the production of Sliver. She recounted that Evans had wanted Stone and Baldwin to have sex, arguing that "then [they'd] have chemistry onscreen" and that "Baldwin's performance [in the film] would get better" and that doing so would "save the movie". She went on to state that she categorically refused Evans's suggestion and that over the coming weeks on set Baldwin made a "few haphazard passes at me, I'm sure spurred on by this genius [Evans]". Baldwin later attacked Stone's allegations on social media, asking rhetorically if Stone still had "a crush on me." At least one entertainment blog criticized Baldwin's comments as "a disgusting misogynistic rant" and noted that Janice Dickinson, whom Baldwin had claimed said Stone had expressed interest in him, had denied his claims.

=== Unused original ending ===
In the film's original ending Zeke Hawkins (Baldwin), instead of Jack Landsford (Tom Berenger), turns out to be the killer. After the police assume Jack to be the murderer, Carly Norris (Stone) and Zeke burn the videotapes. Soon afterwards, they wed atop the Sliver building. On their honeymoon, they fly a helicopter over a Hawaiian volcano where Carly reveals that she knows he is the killer. She tells him she still has the tape of him murdering Gus in the shower and that "it's safe", implying she is willing to cover up his crimes and that she has found the excitement missing from her previous marriage. With their seatbelts off and Carly videotaping the scenery Zeke lowers the aircraft into the volcano as they both laugh gleefully. The scene then cuts to Zeke's surveillance room where the televisions display nothing but static. The end credits roll and leave the audience to decide whether they survive.

The shooting of the final scene resulted in the crashing of the helicopter. After an investigation, the pilot's certificate was temporarily suspended.

Preview audiences disliked the idea of Carly turning immoral, so the ending was re-written and re-shot to the one used in the final release. Original cinematographer Vilmos Zsigmond was no longer available, so his friend László Kovács took over for reshoots.

=== MPAA ratings issues ===
Director Phillip Noyce claimed he had to make 110 edits to the film in order to avoid an NC-17 rating by removing the display of male frontal nudity. Several sex scenes had to be re-shot with alternate angles.

== Music ==
The film score was composed by Howard Shore.

== Release ==
The film premiered on May 19, 1993, at Mann National Theatre in Westwood Village, Los Angeles. It was released two days later, on May 21.

=== Home media ===
When originally released on VHS, the film was released in both its theatrical R-rated version and an unrated version which restored the cuts made by the MPAA. In March 2006, to coincide with the theatrical release of Basic Instinct 2, which starred Stone, Sliver was released on DVD. Only the unrated cut was made commercially available, but the R-rated cut was distributed for rental. Although the film was theatrically shown in the 2.35 aspect ratio, the DVD features a matted, 2.10 aspect ratio transfer. In 2013, the R-rated cut was released on Blu-ray, sourced from the same 2.10 aspect ratio HD master used for the DVD release.

In 2024, Vinegar Syndrome, under license from Paramount, announced an Ultra HD Blu-ray release of the film as part of their annual Black Friday sales event, featuring a new director-supervised 4K restoration of the unrated version presented in its original 2.35 theatrical aspect ratio. The alternative scenes from the R-rated cut are also included as a bonus.

== Reception ==
=== Critical response ===
The film received negative reviews from critics. Review aggregate website Rotten Tomatoes reported that 21% of critics have given the film a positive review based on 29 reviews, with an average rating of 3.9/10. The site's critics consensus reads "Sliver is an absurd erotic thriller with technobabble and posits prime Sharon Stone as a professional book nerd." On Metacritic, the film has a weighted average score of 38 out of 100 based on 21 critics, indicating "generally unfavorable reviews".

The main criticisms were that the film provided little in the way of compelling thriller elements, the script diluted the plot of the Ira Levin novel, the characters were underdeveloped and the actors were not on form. Critics argued that compared to Sharon Stone's role as femme fatale Catherine Tramell in Basic Instinct the year prior, her portrayal in Sliver as Carly, a passive character who has to be "lured into sexual intrigue" is unconvincing. The Austin Chronicle stated, "There's no suspense, no drama, no tension, no logic. It makes you appreciate all the craft that went into Basic Instinct".

Criticism was also directed at the handling of the recurring themes of voyeurism and surveillance. Peter Rainer of the Los Angeles Times wrote, "There’s no emotional pull to the neo-Gothic world in Sliver, where people connect up by video monitor and computer with occasional forays in the flesh. It’s no news that we like to watch. But first you must give us something worth watching." Lastly, many critics also singled out the editing and ending, calling the latter hasty and unconvincing. Audiences polled by CinemaScore gave the film a grade of "C−" on a scale from A+ to F.

=== Box office ===
The film debuted at No. 1 at the box office making $12.1 million in 2,093 theaters. By the second week the box office taking dropped to No. 6. Sliver eventually grossed $36.3 million domestically and $87.6 million internationally to a total of $123.9 million worldwide.

=== Accolades ===
Event	Category	Nominee	Result
14th Golden Raspberry Awards	Worst Picture	Robert Evans	Nominated
14th Golden Raspberry Awards	Worst Director	Phillip Noyce	Nominated
14th Golden Raspberry Awards	Worst Screenplay	Joe Eszterhas	Nominated
14th Golden Raspberry Awards	Worst Actor	William Baldwin	Nominated
14th Golden Raspberry Awards	Worst Actress	Sharon Stone	Nominated
14th Golden Raspberry Awards	Worst Supporting Actor	Tom Berenger	Nominated
14th Golden Raspberry Awards	Worst Supporting Actress	Colleen Camp	Nominated
1994 Stinkers Bad Movie Awards	Worst Picture		Won
1994 Stinkers Bad Movie Awards	Worst Actress	Sharon Stone	Won
1994 MTV Movie Awards	Most Desirable Male	William Baldwin	Won
1994 MTV Movie Awards	Most Desirable Female	Sharon Stone	Nominated

== See also ==
- List of film accidents
- List of films featuring surveillance
- The Temp
- The Tenants Downstairs

Awards
Preceded by Shining Through	Stinker Award for Worst Picture; 1993 Stinkers Bad Movie Awards	Succeeded by North
