= Sliver (novel) =

1991 erotic novel by Ira Levin

- First edition cover
- Author: Ira Levin
- Language: English
- Publisher: Bantam Books
- Publication date: March, 1991
- Publication place: United States
- Media type: Print (hardback, paperback)
- Pages: 190
- ISBN: 0-553-07292-7

Sliver is an erotic novel by the American writer Ira Levin, first published in 1991. The story follows a group of mysterious people in a privately owned high-rise apartment building in New York City after an attractive young woman moves in. The novel was adapted into a film of the same name in 1993. Directed by Phillip Noyce and written by Joe Eszterhas, it starred Sharon Stone, William Baldwin, Polly Walker and Tom Berenger.

== Plot summary ==
Kay Norris, a book editor, moves into a Manhattan "sliver” building. Tall and slender, it has only two apartments on each floor. She meets a handsome and friendly fellow occupant. Norris does not know at first that the young man is the owner. He turns out to be a modern-day “peeping tom” who secretly had surveillance cameras and microphones installed in every apartment, with his own place in the building serving as his headquarters. Norris soon becomes embroiled in a murder mystery, and finds herself in danger.

== Reception ==
Carolyn See's review in the Los Angeles Times observed the book's heroine "lives such a blameless life...that it comes as a refreshing relief when the voyeur insinuates his way into her real life--even though we all know that no good can come of it." See concluded that "'Sliver,' on the horror graph, comes in at about the level of a hot fudge sundae."
