= MTV Movie Award for Most Desirable Female =

This is a following list of the MTV Movie Award winners for Most Desirable Female. This award was last given out in 1996, along with its counterpart, Most Desirable Male.

Year	Actor Movie	Nominated
1992	Linda Hamilton – Terminator 2: Judgment Day as Sarah Connor	Christina Applegate - Don't Tell Mom the Babysitter's Dead as Sue Ellen Crandell; Kim Basinger - Final Analysis as Heather Evans; Tia Carrere - Wayne's World as Cassandra Wong; Julia Roberts - Dying Young as Hilary O'Neil
1993	Sharon Stone – Basic Instinct as Catherine Tramell	Kim Basinger - Cool World as Holli Would; Halle Berry - Boomerang as Angela Lewis; Madonna - Body of Evidence as Rebecca Carlson; Michelle Pfeiffer - Batman Returns as Selina Kyle / Catwoman
1994	Janet Jackson – Poetic Justice as Justice	Kim Basinger - The Getaway as Carol McCoy; Demi Moore - Indecent Proposal as Diana Murphy; Alicia Silverstone - The Crush as Adrian Forrester; Sharon Stone - Sliver as Carly Norris
1995	Sandra Bullock – Speed as Annie Porter	Halle Berry - The Flintstones as Miss Sharon Stone; Cameron Diaz - The Mask as Tina Carlyle; Demi Moore - Disclosure as Meredith Johnson; Sharon Stone - The Specialist as May Munro
1996	Alicia Silverstone – Clueless as Cher Horowitz	Sandra Bullock - While You Were Sleeping as Lucy Moderatz; Nicole Kidman - Batman Forever as Dr. Chase Meridian; Demi Moore - The Scarlet Letter as Hester Prynne; Michelle Pfeiffer - Dangerous Minds as LouAnne Johnson
