= Sharon Stone =

American actress (born 1958)

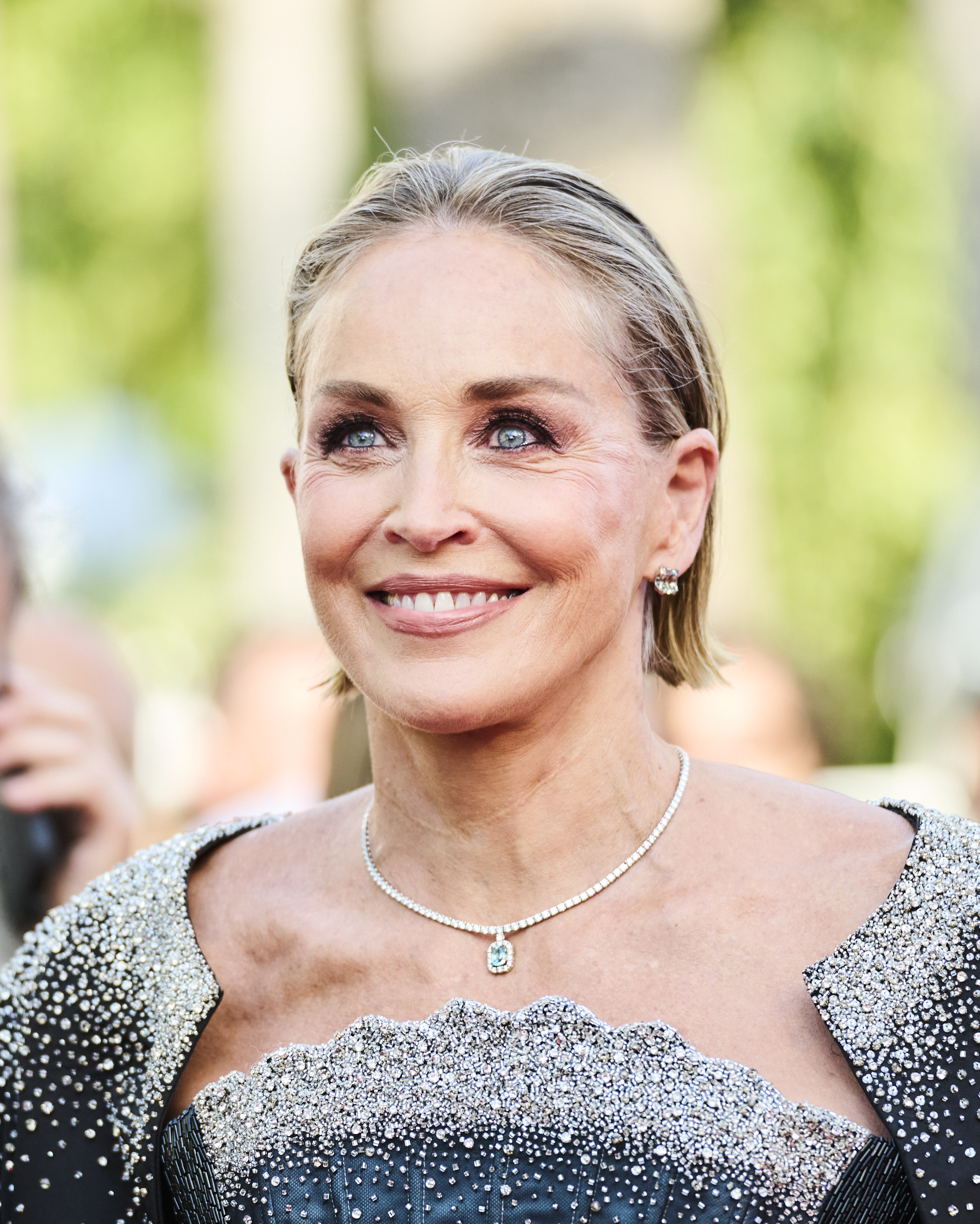
- Stone in 2026
- Born: Sharon Vonne Stone; March 10, 1958 (age 68); Meadville, Pennsylvania, U.S.
- Occupation: Actress
- Years active: 1976–present
- Works: Filmography
- Spouses: Michael Greenburg (m. 1984; div. 1990); Phil Bronstein (m. 1998; div. 2004)
- Partner(s): William Macdonald (1992–1994); Bob Wagner (1994–1995)
- Children: 3
- Awards: Full list

Sharon Vonne Stone (born March 10, 1958) is an American actress. Known for primarily playing femmes fatales and women of mystery in film and television, she became one of the most popular sex symbols of the 1990s. Her accolades include a Primetime Emmy Award, a Golden Globe Award, and a nomination for an Academy Award. She was named Officer of the Order of Arts and Letters in France in 2005 (Commander in 2021).

After modeling in television commercials and print advertisements, Stone made her film debut as an extra in Woody Allen's Stardust Memories (1980) and played her first speaking part in Wes Craven's Deadly Blessing (1981). In the 1980s, she appeared in such films as Irreconcilable Differences (1984), King Solomon's Mines (1985), Action Jackson (1988), and Above the Law (1988). She had a breakthrough with her part in Paul Verhoeven's science fiction film Total Recall (1990), before rising to international recognition when she portrayed Catherine Tramell in Verhoeven's erotic thriller Basic Instinct (1992), for which she earned her first Golden Globe Award nomination.

Stone's performance as a trophy wife in Martin Scorsese's crime drama Casino (1995) earned her a Golden Globe Award along with a nomination for the Academy Award for Best Actress. Her other notable films include Sliver (1993), The Specialist (1994), The Quick and the Dead (1995), Catwoman (2004), Broken Flowers (2005), Alpha Dog (2006), Bobby (2006), Fading Gigolo (2013), The Disaster Artist (2017), Rolling Thunder Revue: A Bob Dylan Story by Martin Scorsese (2019), and The Laundromat (2019).

On television, Stone has featured in the ABC miniseries War and Remembrance (1987), the HBO television film If These Walls Could Talk 2 (2000), Steven Soderbergh's Mosaic (2017) and Ryan Murphy's Ratched (2020). She made guest appearances in The Practice (2004) and Law & Order: Special Victims Unit (2010), winning the Primetime Emmy Award for Outstanding Guest Actress in a Drama Series for the former.

== Early life ==
Sharon Vonne Stone was born on March 10, 1958, in Meadville, Pennsylvania, to Methodist parents Dorothy Marie (née Lawson), an accountant, and Joseph William Stone II, a tool and die manufacturer and former factory worker. She has three siblings. She is mostly of Scots-Irish and English descent. She has some Irish ancestry. In a 2013 interview with Conan O'Brien, she stated that her Irish ancestors arrived in the United States during the Great Famine. She has a reported IQ of 154. Stone was considered academically gifted as a child and entered the second grade when she was five years old. Stone said that she and her sister were both sexually abused as children by their maternal grandfather, in an interview to The New York Times in March 2021, while promoting her memoir The Beauty of Living Twice. At 14, her neck was badly injured while breaking a horse when the animal bucked as it charged toward a washing line.

She graduated from Saegertown High School in Saegertown, Pennsylvania, in 1975. Stone was admitted to Edinboro State College on a creative writing scholarship at age 15, but quit college and moved to New York City to become a fashion model. Inspired by Hillary Clinton, in 2016 Stone went back to Edinboro University of Pennsylvania to complete her degree.

== Career ==
=== Modeling and early screen appearances (1976-1989) ===
While attending Edinboro State College, Stone won the title of Miss Crawford County, Pennsylvania, and in 1976, was a candidate for Miss Pennsylvania. One of the pageant judges told her to quit college and move to New York City to become a fashion model. Stone left Meadville and moved in with an aunt in New Jersey, and by 1977, she had been signed by Ford Modeling Agency in New York City. She soon moved to Europe, living for a year in Milan and then in Paris. While living there, she decided to quit modeling and pursue acting. "So I packed my bags, moved back to New York, and stood in line to be an extra in a Woody Allen movie", she later recalled. At 20, Stone was cast for a brief role in Allen's dramedy Stardust Memories (1980) and had a speaking part a year later in the horror film Deadly Blessing (1981).

French director Claude Lelouch cast Stone in the musical epic Les Uns et les Autres (1982), starring James Caan, but she was on screen for two minutes and did not appear in the credits. She secured guest-spots on the television series Silver Spoons (1982), Bay City Blues (1983), Remington Steele (1983), Magnum, P.I. (1984), and T. J. Hooker (1985); played a starlet who breaks up the marriage of a successful director and his screenwriter wife in the drama Irreconcilable Differences (1984), opposite Ryan O'Neal, Shelley Long and a young Drew Barrymore; and starred as a resourceful woman teaming up with a fortune hunter (played by Richard Chamberlain) in the action-centered King Solomon's Mines (1985) and Allan Quatermain and the Lost City of Gold (1986), a light, comedic take on the Indiana Jones film series, which were poorly received by critics and audiences. In his review for King Solomon's Mines, Walter Goodman of The New York Times considered that Stone was "up to date as a spunky, sexy, smart-talking heroine with an effective right hook" but felt that the story was "lost in the effects". For her performance in Allan Quatermain and the Lost City of Gold, she received her first Golden Raspberry Award nomination for Worst Actress.

Stone obtained the role of Janice Henry in the ABC miniseries War and Remembrance (1987), the sequel to the 1983 miniseries The Winds of War, based on the 1978 novel of the same name written by Herman Wouk. Through the remainder of the 1980s, she appeared as a reporter in the comedy Police Academy 4: Citizens on Patrol (1987), an attractive but mysterious woman with a hidden agenda in the thriller Cold Steel (1987), the wife of an ex-CIA agent in the crime film Above the Law (1988) and the ill-fated wife of a successful businessman in the action film Action Jackson (1988).

=== Breakthrough and Basic Instinct (1990-1992) ===
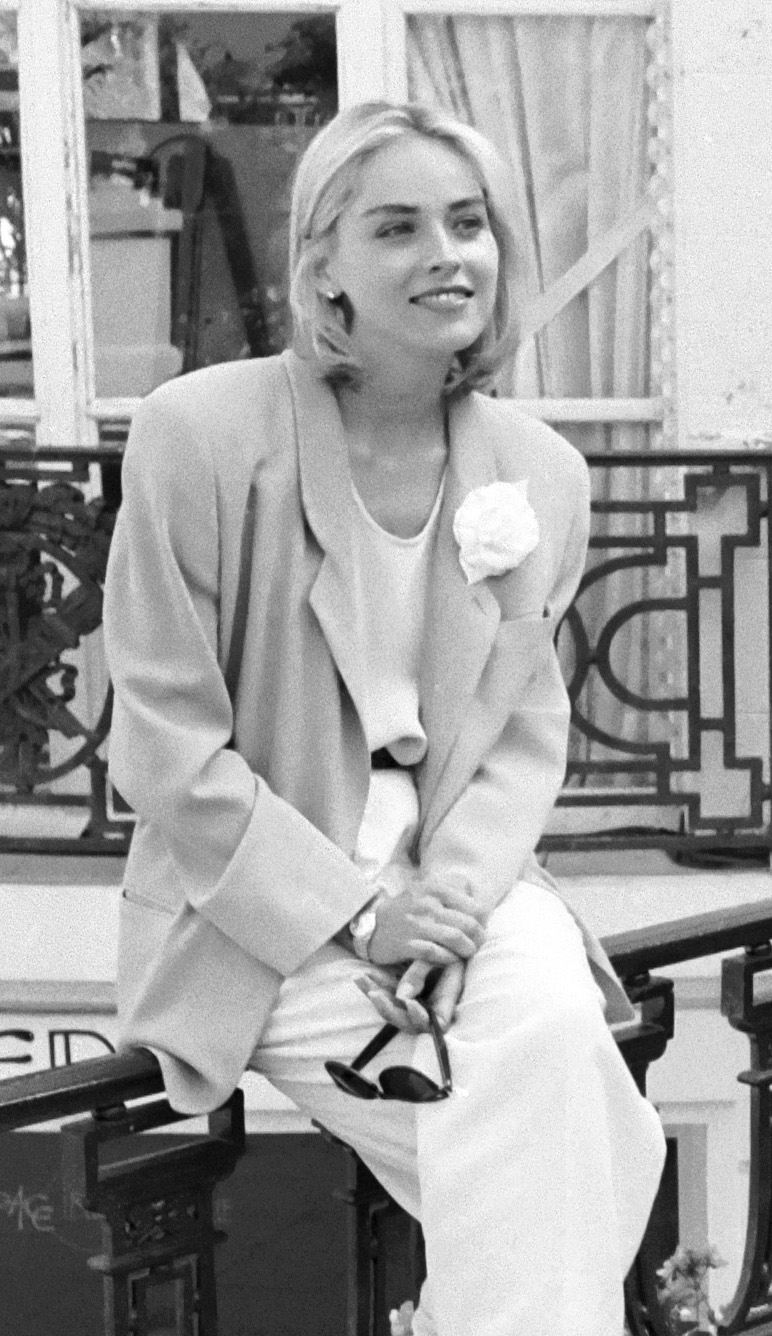
Stone at the Deauville American Film Festival in 1991

In Paul Verhoeven's Total Recall (1990), a science fiction action film opposite Arnold Schwarzenegger, Stone played the seemingly loving wife of a construction worker. The film received favorable reviews and made $261.2 million worldwide, giving Stone's career a major boost, leading to her being cast in five feature films released throughout 1991. She played what Roger Ebert described as the "bad girl" in the romantic comedy He Said, She Said, a sexually repressed woman in the psychological thriller Scissors, a wealthy blonde in the crime drama Diary of a Hitman, a provocative young photojournalist in the thriller Year of the Gun and the agent and former lover of a writer in the neo-noir Where Sleeping Dogs Lie.

In another Verhoeven film, the erotic thriller Basic Instinct (1992), she took on the role that made her a star, playing Catherine Tramell, a brilliant bisexual novelist and alleged serial killer. Several actresses at the time turned down the role, mostly because of the nudity required. Critical response towards Basic Instinct was mixed, but Stone received critical acclaim for her "star-making performance"; Peter Travers of Rolling Stone remarked that "Verhoeven's cinematic wet dream delivers the goods, especially when Sharon Stone struts on with enough come-on carnality to singe the screen," and observed of the actress' portrayal: "Stone, a former model, is a knockout; she even got a rise out of Ah-nold in Verhoeven's Total Recall. But being the bright spot in too many dull movies (He Said, She Said; Irreconcilable Differences) stalled her career. Though Basic Instinct establishes Stone as a bombshell for the 1990s, it also shows she can nail a laugh or shade an emotion with equal aplomb." Australian critic Shannon J. Harvey of The Sunday Times called the film "one of the best films of the early 1990s, doing more for female empowerment than any feminist rally. Stone – in her star-making performance – is as hot and sexy as she is ice-pick cold." For the part, Stone earned a Golden Globe Award nomination for Best Actress in a Motion Picture – Drama, four MTV Movie Awards nominations, and a Golden Raspberry Award nomination for Worst New Star for her "tribute to Theodore Cleaver". The film also became one of the most financially successful productions of the 1990s, grossing US$352.9 million worldwide.

=== Leading lady status (1993-1999) ===
In 1993, Stone played a femme fatale in the erotic thriller Sliver, based on Ira Levin's eponymous novel about the mysterious occurrences in a privately owned New York City high-rise apartment building. The film was heavily panned by critics and earned Stone a Golden Raspberry Award nomination for Worst Actress but became a commercial success, grossing US$116.3 million at the international box office. She also made a cameo appearance in the action film Last Action Hero (1993), reuniting with Arnold Schwarzenegger. In 1994, Stone appeared as the wife of an architect opposite Richard Gere in the drama Intersection, and as a woman who entices a bomb expert she is involved with into destroying the criminal gang that killed her family, alongside Sylvester Stallone, in the action thriller The Specialist. While Intersection found limited success, The Specialist made US$170.3 million worldwide. For her work in both films, she won a Golden Raspberry Award and a Stinkers Bad Movie Award for Worst Actress, but was nominated for the MTV Movie Award for Most Desirable Female for The Specialist.

In The Quick and the Dead (1995), Stone took on the role of a gunfighter who returns to a frontier town in an effort to avenge her father's death. She served as a producer on the film and had some creative control over the production; she chose director Sam Raimi, after being impressed by his work on Army of Darkness, and co-star Russell Crowe after watching Romper Stomper. She paid Leonardo DiCaprio's salary herself after a reluctance from Sony, the film's studio, over his casting. The Quick and the Dead was a modest profit and earned Stone a Saturn Award nomination for Best Actress. Stone starred opposite Robert De Niro in Martin Scorsese's epic crime drama Casino (1995), where she took on the role of Ginger McKenna, the scheming, self-absorbed wife of a top gambling handicapper (De Niro). The film, based on the non-fiction book Casino: Love and Honor in Las Vegas by Nicholas Pileggi, received widespread critical acclaim, made US$116.1 million globally, and earned her the Golden Globe Award for Best Actress in a Motion Picture – Drama and a nomination for the Academy Award for Best Actress. During an interview with The Observer, published on January 28, 1996, Stone said of the response: "Thank God. I mean just finally, wow [...] I am not getting any younger. It couldn't have happened at a better time". That year, she received a star on the Hollywood Walk of Fame, located at 6925 Hollywood Blvd, and was awarded the Women in Film Crystal Award.

Stone portrayed the mistress of a cruel school master in the psychological thriller Diabolique (1996), a woman waiting on death row for a brutal double murder in the drama Last Dance (1996), and a biologist in the suspense film Sphere (1998). The three aforementioned films were panned by critics and failed to find an audience in theaters. In 1998, Stone also lent her voice for the successful animated film Antz, and played the mother of a 13-year-old boy suffering from Morquio syndrome in the drama The Mighty, which garnered a positive critical response. Stone was nominated for the Golden Globe Award for Best Supporting Actress for her performance in the lattermost.

Her turn as a street-wise, middle-aged moll in Gloria (1999), a remake of the 1980 film of the same name, proved to be a critical and commercial misfire. A titular role followed in 1999 with the comedy The Muse, playing the inspiration of an esteemed screenwriter. Wade Major, a critic for Boxoffice, found her portrayal of a "dizzy Muse" to be "the film's most delightful surprise", but most reviews were ultimately lukewarm. Helmut Voss, then president of the Hollywood Foreign Press Association, which gave the annual Golden Globe Awards, ordered all 82 of its members to return gift luxury watches sent by either Stone or October Films (now merged into Focus Features) as these were considered to be promotions for a nomination for Stone's performance in the film. She ultimately received the nomination for Best Actress in a Motion Picture – Comedy or Musical.

=== Hiatus and downturn (2000-2004) ===
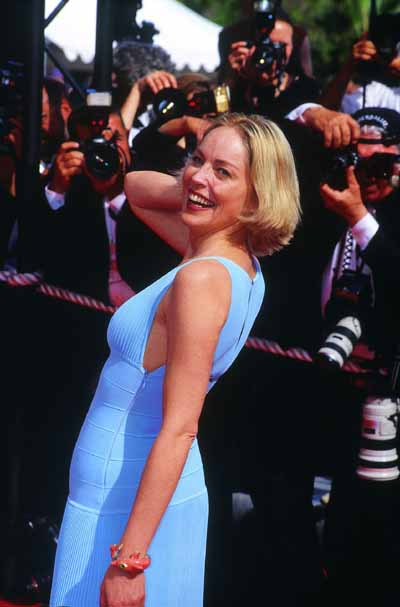
Stone at the 2002 Cannes Film Festival

In 2000, Stone played a lesbian trying to start a family, opposite Ellen DeGeneres, in the HBO television film If These Walls Could Talk 2 and starred as an exotic dancer, alongside Billy Connolly, in the comedy Beautiful Joe. While she was recognized by Women in Film with her second Lucy Award for her performance in If These Walls Could Talk 2, Beautiful Joe premiered on cable television instead of receiving a theatrical release in North America. Nathan Rabin of The A.V. Club, who had been critical of Stone's previous films, wrote that "nothing she's done has been quite as shameless or appalling as Beautiful Joe, a toxic piece of whimsy that ranks among the worst films of 2000".

Following her September 2001 hospitalization for a subarachnoid hemorrhage, Stone took a hiatus from screen acting. She faced professional challenges as she was in the process of recovery. She felt that she had "lost [her] place" in Hollywood, and during a 2015 interview with USA Today, she remarked: "[When] you find yourself at the back of the line in your business, as I did, [you] have to figure yourself out all over again." She returned to the screen in 2003, when she took on a three-episode arc as Sheila Carlisle, an attorney who believes she can communicate with God, in the eighth season of The Practice. For her performance, she received the Primetime Emmy Award for Outstanding Guest Actress in a Drama Series.

Stone attempted a return to the mainstream with roles in the films Cold Creek Manor (2003) with Dennis Quaid and Catwoman (2004) with Halle Berry. In the mystery psychological thriller Cold Creek Manor, she and Quaid played a couple terrorized by the former owner of the rural estate they bought in foreclosure. Variety magazine remarked in its review for the film that both actors "fish in vain to find any angles to play in their dimension-free characters". The superhero film Catwoman saw her play the age-obsessed CEO of a cosmetic company and the story's antagonist. While both films flopped at the box office, Catwoman is considered by many critics to be one of the worst movies of all time.

=== Independent films and ensemble dramas (2005-2017) ===
Her next film release was Jim Jarmusch's dramedy Broken Flowers (2005), in which Stone took on the role of a grasping and overly eager closet organizer who re-connects with a former womanizer (played by Bill Murray). Unlike her previous few film outings, Broken Flowers was met with critical acclaim, upon its premiere at Cannes, where it was nominated for the Palme d'Or and won the Grand Prix. Far Out Magazine ranked Stone's role among one of her "10 best performances", while New York Magazine remarked: "Sharon Stone, playing a widow who's half-hippie, half-working-class-tough, demonstrates that, given the right part, she's still not merely sexy but knockabout funny and sly". In 2005, she was named Officer of the Order of Arts and Letters in France.

After years of litigation, Basic Instinct 2 was released on March 31, 2006. A reason for a long delay in releasing the film was reportedly Stone's dispute with the filmmakers over the nudity in the film; she wanted more while they wanted less. Stone told an interviewer, "We are in a time of odd repression and if a popcorn movie allows us to create a platform for discussion, wouldn't that be great?" Despite an estimated budget of US$70 million, Basic Instinct 2 placed only tenth in gross on its opening weekend with a meager US$3.2 million and finished with a total domestic gross of under US$6 million. Stone appeared in Nick Cassavetes's crime drama Alpha Dog (2006), opposite Bruce Willis, playing Olivia Mazursky, the mother of a real-life murder victim; she wore a fatsuit for the role. The film premiered at the 2006 Sundance Film Festival and was an arthouse success. She made part of an ensemble cast in Emilio Estevez's drama Bobby (2006), about the hours leading up to the assassination of Robert F. Kennedy. Stone received favorable comments for her performance, particularly a scene alongside Lindsay Lohan. As a member of the cast, she was nominated for the Screen Actors Guild Award for Outstanding Performance by a Cast in a Motion Picture, but won in the Hollywood Film Festival Award for Best Ensemble Cast.

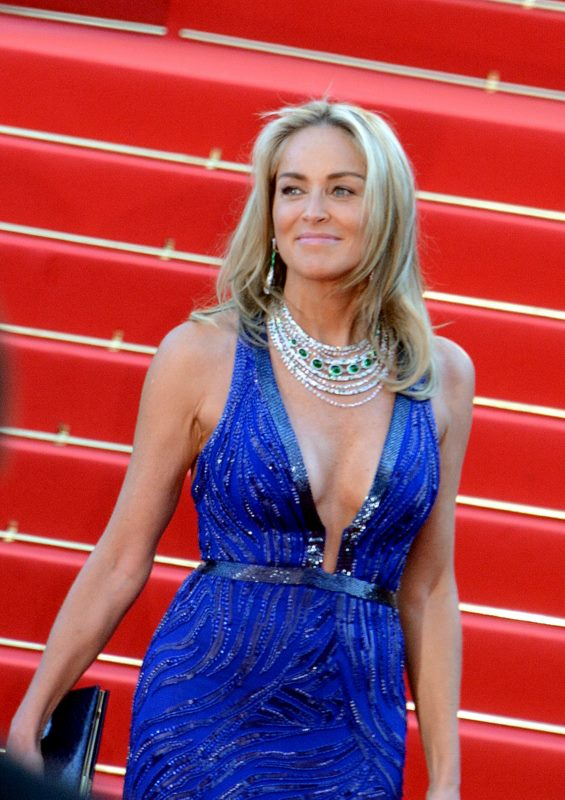
Stone at the 2013 Cannes Film Festival

Stone took on the role of a clinically depressed woman in the independent drama When a Man Falls in the Forest (2007), which premiered in competition at the 57th Berlin International Film Festival where it was nominated for the Golden Bear. All of her late 2000s films —If I Had Known I Was a Genius (2007), The Year of Getting to Know Us (2008), Five Dollars a Day (2009) and Streets of Blood (2009)— were direct-to-DVD releases in North America. In 2010, Stone made guest-appearances in four episodes of Law & Order: Special Victims Unit, portraying Jo Marlowe, a former cop turned prosecutor. Entertainment Weekly included in a review such descriptions of her performance as a "great presence", and having "had to revive her best [...] tone to sell hokey lines" in a series it described as "mawkish and overwrought". She took on the leading female role in the French action sequel Largo Winch II as a United Nations investigator named Diane Francken. Her first theatrical-released production since 2007, the film premiered on February 16, 2011, in France, where it opened in second place at the box office. She next starred as a hard-hitting journalist in the thriller Border Run (2012), which received a direct-to-DVD release.

In 2013, Stone played the mother of porn actress Linda Lovelace (Amanda Seyfried) in the biographical drama Lovelace, and a dermatologist seeking a ménage à trois in the Woody Allen–John Turturro comedy Fading Gigolo. Both films were released in limited theaters to a decent critical reception; Glenn Kenny, in his review for Fading Gigolo, found Stone to be "splendidly understated" in what he described as "a New York story through and through [...] often funny, sometimes moving, occasionally goofy as hell". In 2014, she starred as an actress-turned-publisher, opposite Riccardo Scamarcio, in the Italian dramedy A Golden Boy (Un ragazzo d'oro), directed by Pupi Avati, and portrayed America's first female Vice President in the TNT action drama series Agent X, which only aired for one season. Stone next played an adoptive mother in the drama Mothers and Daughters (2016), a "lineman widow" and the "alcoholic mom" of a high-wire worker in the action film Life on the Line (2016), and a greedy billionaire in the drama Running Wild (2017). These three films all received a VOD release, to varying responses. James Franco's biographical comedy The Disaster Artist (2017), which featured Stone as Iris Burton, the agent of actor Greg Sestero, was a critical and commercial success, and was chosen by the National Board of Review as one of the top ten films of 2017.

=== Film and television balance (2018–present) ===
Stone returned to television in 2018, when she portrayed a murdered children's book author and illustrator in Steven Soderbergh's HBO mystery production Mosaic, which was released as an iOS/Android mobile app serving as an interactive film and as a television drama. She received positive reviews for her performance. Maureen Ryan of Variety felt that the actress "displays terrific range and depth" and "holds the screen with effortless charisma", and Nick Schager of The Daily Beast wrote that "Stone's turn is something close to masterful." She earned the Satellite Award for Best Supporting Actress in a Series, Miniseries, or Television Film.

In Rolling Thunder Revue: A Bob Dylan Story by Martin Scorsese (2019), a pseudo-documentary film covering Bob Dylan's 1975 Rolling Thunder Revue concert tour, Stone played an exaggerated version of herself. The film was released on Netflix, to critical acclaim. Owen Gleiberman described her appearance as a "marketing hook" and further stated: "The presence of Sharon Stone embodies the spirit of [the Hollywood] machine. She has always been a good actress (probably better than many know; just watch her in Casino), but her fame will forever rest on a certain crudely riveting but debased high-budget exploitation thriller". She reunited with Soderbergh for The Laundromat (2019), in which she played a harried realtor, opposite Meryl Streep.

In Netflix's psychological thriller series Ratched (2020), a prequel to Miloš Forman's 1975 film One Flew Over the Cuckoo's Nest developed by Ryan Murphy, Stone portrayed a wealthy heiress who hires a hit man to kill a doctor for disfiguring her son. Intrigued by Murphy's pitch for her character, which he wrote for her, Stone described the part as "completely insane. And at the same time she thinks she's really a loving mother who has her shit together". The series garnered a decent critical response and was viewed by 48 million people in its first four weeks of release. In 2020 Stone appeared as herself in an introduction to the fifth episode of The New Pope, where she had an audience with John Malkovich as Pope John Paul III.

In 2021, she also appeared as herself in the dramedy Here Today, directed by Billy Crystal, and was cast in the romantic drama Beauty, directed by Andrew Dosunmu for Netflix.

In 2025, Stone was officially cast in the third season of Euphoria, joining a principal ensemble that includes Zendaya, Sydney Sweeney, and Jacob Elordi, She stated that she was "honored" to join the project and expressed enthusiasm about working with the series, creative team and cast.

In August 2026, it was announced that Stone would star alongside Ramy Youssef in the upcoming film comedy Martha & Muhammad for A24.

== Public image ==
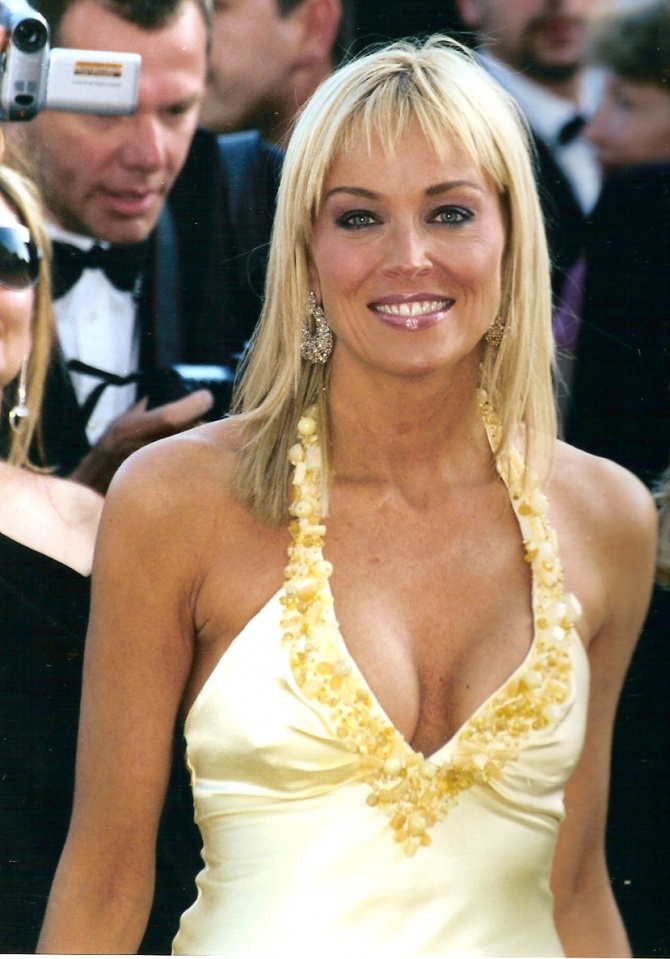
Stone at the 2005 Cannes Film Festival

=== In media and fashion ===
For her leading roles in erotic and adult-themed feature films such as Basic Instinct, Sliver, and The Specialist, Stone cemented what was described as a "tough-talking, no-underwear, voyeuristic, cool-as-ice, sex symbol" status during the 1990s.

She has appeared on the covers and pictorials of over 300 celebrity and fashion magazines throughout her four-decade acting career. She graced the June–July 1986 cover of French Vogue, and to coincide with the release of Total Recall, she posed nude for the July 1990 issue of Playboy, flaunting the muscles she had developed in preparation for the film. Following Basic Instinct, photographer George Hurrell took a series of photographs of Stone, Sherilyn Fenn, Julian Sands, Raquel Welch, Eric Roberts, and Sean Penn.

Stone, who was Hurrell's reportedly last sitting before his death in 1992, is also a collector of the photographer's original prints and wrote the foreword to the book Hurrell's Hollywood. In 1993, she appeared in Pirelli's commercial, Driving Instinct, in 2005, became the face of Dior's Capture skincare line, and in 2016, starred with Paul Sculfor in Airfield's (de) Fashion Is a Lovestory short film.

Stone's public and professional profiles have been strongly tied to her appearance and sex appeal. She has ranked among the "50 most beautiful people in the world" by People in 1992, the "100 sexiest stars in film history" by Empire in 1995 and 1997, and the "25 sexiest stars of the century" by Playboy in 1999. She has also been the subject of four television documentary specials, and several biographies have been written about her. On her sex symbol image, Stone told Oprah Winfrey on Oprah Prime in 2014: "It's a pleasure for me now. I mean, I'm gonna be 56 years old. If people want to think I'm a sex symbol, it's, like, yeah. Think it up. You know. I mean, like, good for me".

She posed nude for the September 2015 issue of Harper's Bazaar, in which she stated: "At a certain point you start asking yourself, 'What really is sexy?' It's not just the elevation of your boobs. It's being present and having fun and liking yourself enough to like the person that's with you".

=== Criticism ===
On January 28, 2005, Stone helped solicit pledges for $1 million in five minutes for mosquito nets in Tanzania, turning a panel on African poverty into an impromptu fundraiser at the World Economic Forum in Davos, Switzerland. Many observers, including UNICEF, criticized her actions by claiming that Stone had reacted instinctively to the words of Tanzanian President Benjamin Mkapa, because she had not done her research on the causes, consequences, and methods of preventing malaria. Of the $1 million pledged, only $250,000 was actually raised. To fulfill the promise to send $1 million worth of bed nets to Tanzania, UNICEF contributed $750,000. This diverted funds from other UNICEF projects. According to prominent economist Xavier Sala-i-Martin, officials are largely unaware of what happened with the bed nets. Some were delivered to the local airport. These reportedly were stolen and later resurfaced as wedding dresses on the local black market.

Stone was criticized over her comments in an exchange on the red carpet with Hong Kong's Cable Entertainment News during the 2008 Cannes Film Festival on May 25, 2008. When asked about the 2008 Sichuan earthquake she remarked:

Well you know it was very interesting because at first, you know, I'm not happy about the way the Chinese are treating the Tibetans because I don't think anyone should be unkind to anyone else. And so I have been very concerned about how to think and what to do about that because I don't like that. And I had been this, you know, concerned about, oh how should we deal with the Olympics because they are not being nice to the Dalai Lama, who is a good friend of mine. And then this earthquake and all this stuff happened, and then I thought, is that karma? When you're not nice that the bad things happen to you?

One of China's biggest cinema chains reacted to Stone's comments by declaring it would not show her films in its theaters. The founder of the UME Cineplex chain and the chairman of the Federation of Hong Kong Filmmakers, Ng See-yuen, called Stone's comments "inappropriate", and said the UME Cineplex chain would no longer present her films. Dior advertisements featuring Stone's image were dropped from all ads in China amid the public uproar. Stone was removed from the 2008 Shanghai International Film Festival guest list, and the event's organizers considered banning the actress permanently. Dior China had originally posted an apology in Stone's name, but Stone later denied making the apology during an interview with The New York Times, saying "I'm not going to apologize. I'm certainly not going to apologize for something that isn't real and true – not for face creams," although she did admit that she had "sounded like an idiot." However, after the interview, Stone released a statement entitled "In my own words by Sharon Stone" in which she said "I could not be more regretful of that mistake. It was unintentional. I apologize. Those words were never meant to be hurtful to anyone."

== Visual art ==
Since the early 2020s, Stone has pursued painting as a second career, having first learned from her aunt as a child and returned to the practice during the COVID-19 pandemic. Her debut solo exhibition, Shedding, opened at Allouche Gallery in Culver City, Los Angeles, in March 2023, followed later that year by Welcome to My Garden at C. Parker Gallery in Greenwich, Connecticut.

Her largely abstract paintings centre on nature and environmental themes, with recurring motifs such as shed snakeskin representing change; she has cited painters Joan Mitchell and Helen Frankenthaler as influences.

== Personal life ==
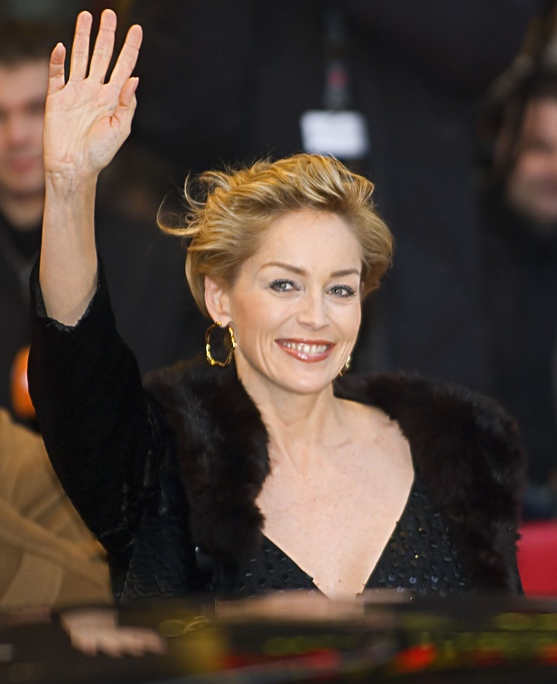
Stone at the 2007 Berlin International Film Festival

On September 29, 2001, Stone was hospitalized for a subarachnoid hemorrhage, which was diagnosed as a vertebral artery dissection rather than the more common ruptured aneurysm, and treated with an endovascular coil embolization. She has stated that while she was sick, people took advantage of her and stole $18 million from her. She nearly went broke.

=== Relationships and family ===
In 1984, she met television producer Michael Greenburg on the set of The Vegas Strip War, a television film he produced and she starred in. They married the same year. In 1986, Greenburg was her line producer on Allan Quatermain and the Lost City of Gold. The couple separated three years later, and their divorce was finalized in 1990.

Stone and comedian Garry Shandling were students of acting coach Roy London and dated briefly. She appeared on his show The Larry Sanders Show in the episode "The Mr. Sharon Stone Show". They remained close friends until Shandling's death in 2016.

In 1993, Stone met William J. MacDonald on the set of the film Sliver, which he co-produced. MacDonald left his wife for Stone and became engaged to her. They separated one year later in 1994. After they separated, Stone returned the engagement ring via FedEx. While working on the film The Quick and the Dead in 1994, Stone met Bob Wagner, a first assistant director, and they became engaged.

On February 14, 1998, Stone married Phil Bronstein, executive editor of The San Francisco Examiner and later San Francisco Chronicle. Stone suffered several miscarriages due to an autoimmune disease and endometriosis and was unable to have children. They adopted a son in 2000. Bronstein filed for divorce in 2003, citing irreconcilable differences. The divorce became final in 2004, with a judge ruling that their son should remain primarily with Bronstein, and Stone would have visitation rights.

Stone adopted her second son in 2005 and her third son in 2006. As of 2018, Stone resides with her three sons in West Hollywood, California, in a home once owned by the actor Montgomery Clift.

In 2018, Stone was in a relationship with Italian entrepreneur Angelo Boffa.

=== Activism ===
In March 2006, Stone traveled to Israel to promote peace in the Middle East through a press conference with Nobel Peace Prize winner and former prime minister of Israel Shimon Peres. In 2013, she referred to Peres, who was then serving as the president of Israel, as her "mentor". On October 23, 2013, Stone received the Peace Summit Award for her work for people with HIV/AIDS.

In 2015, Stone was guest of honor at the Pilosio Building Peace Award in Milan. She began an impromptu auction on stage in front of a crowd of CEOs from the construction industry and other dignitaries. She gained enough pledges to build 28 schools in Africa.

== Selected filmography and accolades ==
In a career spanning over four decades, Stone has had over one hundred acting credits in film and on television. She has won 10 awards from 41 nominations, including one Golden Globe Award (for Casino), one Primetime Emmy Award (for The Practice), and two MTV Movie Awards (for Basic Instinct). Her top-billing roles and most notable films as of 2026 include:

- Irreconcilable Differences (1984)
- King Solomon's Mines (1985)
- Above the Law (1988)
- Action Jackson (1988)
- Total Recall (1990)
- Basic Instinct (1992)
- Sliver (1993)
- The Specialist (1994)
- The Quick and the Dead (1995)
- Casino (1995)
- Antz (1998) (Voice)
- Sphere (1998)
- Catwoman (2004)
- Broken Flowers (2005)
- Basic Instinct 2 (2006)
- Alpha Dog (2006)
- Bobby (2006)
- Fading Gigolo (2013)
- The Disaster Artist (2017)
- Rolling Thunder Revue: A Bob Dylan Story by Martin Scorsese (2019)
- The Laundromat (2019)
- Nobody 2 (2025)
- Euphoria (2026)

In December 2024, Sharon Stone was included on the BBC's 100 Women list.

== Bibliography ==
- Stone, Sharon (2021). The Beauty of Living Twice (First ed.). New York: Alfred A. Knopf. ISBN 9780525656760. OCLC 1234479428.
