= The Beauty of Living Twice =

2021 memoir by Sharon Stone

- Author: Sharon Stone
- Publisher: Alfred A. Knopf
- Publication date: March 30, 2021
- Pages: 256
- ISBN: 978-0-525-65676-0

The Beauty of Living Twice is a 2021 memoir by Sharon Stone.

The book debuted at #4 on the New York Times Bestseller list for Hardcover Nonfiction Books.
