= The Quick and the Dead (1995 film) =

American Western film by Sam Raimi

- Theatrical release poster
- Directed by: Sam Raimi
- Written by: Simon Moore
- Produced by: Joshua Donen; Patrick Markey; Allen Shapiro
- Starring: Sharon Stone; Gene Hackman; Russell Crowe; Roberts Blossom; Kevin Conway; Lance Henriksen; Pat Hingle; Gary Sinise; Leonardo DiCaprio
- Cinematography: Dante Spinotti
- Edited by: Pietro Scalia
- Music by: Alan Silvestri
- Production companies: TriStar Pictures; Japan Satellite Broadcasting (JSB); IndieProd Company Productions
- Distributed by: Sony Pictures Releasing
- Release date: February 10, 1995 (United States)
- Running time: 108 minutes
- Country: United States
- Language: English
- Budget: $35 million
- Box office: $47 million

The Quick and the Dead is a 1995 American revisionist Western film directed by Sam Raimi. The film stars Sharon Stone, Gene Hackman, Russell Crowe and Leonardo DiCaprio. The screenplay was written by Simon Moore but includes contributions from Joss Whedon. The story focuses on "The Lady" (Stone), a gunfighter who rides into the frontier town of Redemption, controlled by John Herod (Hackman). The Lady joins a deadly dueling competition in an attempt to exact revenge for her father's death.

Simon Moore's script was purchased by Sony Pictures Entertainment in May 1993, and actress Sharon Stone signed on as both star and co-producer. Development was fast-tracked after director Sam Raimi's hiring, and principal photography began in Old Tucson Studios in Arizona on November 21, 1993. The film was distributed by TriStar Pictures and was released in the United States on February 10, 1995, to a dismal box-office performance, receiving mixed reviews from critics. In later years, however, the film earned critical praise, especially for the performances, direction, cinematography and musical score, with some critics noting it as underrated in Raimi's catalog.

== Plot ==
In 1881, a gunslinger known as "The Lady" arrives in the Old West town of Redemption, which is ruled by a ruthless outlaw-turned-mayor named John Herod. Herod has announced a fast-draw single-elimination shooting tournament with a large cash prize for the winner. The rules stipulate that any contestant may challenge any other, no challenge can be refused, every contestant must fight once per day, and a fight continues until one contestant either yields or dies. The Lady announces her participation, insisting she is interested only in the prize.

During the sign-up, Herod's henchmen arrive with Cort, an exceptionally skilled gunfighter and a former member of their gang. Cort has renounced violence to become a preacher and refuses to participate in the tournament. Herod's men attempt to lynch him, but The Lady shoots through the rope, freeing him. The Lady meets "The Kid", a brash young man who believes Herod is his father and hopes to earn his respect by winning the tournament. She wakes up alone in The Kid's bed and notices some barrels of loose dynamite under it.

In the first round, Herod kills Ace Hanlon, a braggart who took credit for some of Herod's kills as an outlaw. The Kid and The Lady easily defeat their opponents. Herod buys a cheap gun for Cort from The Kid and declares he can have only one bullet at a time, to prevent him from shooting his way out of town. Despite his conversion, Cort reflexively draws when challenged and wins his first-round duel.

Before the quarterfinals, Herod meets with Clay Cantrell, a professional gunfighter hired by the townspeople to kill him. Herod declares all duels are now to the death and kills Cantrell. The Kid wins his second fight against Scars, an escaped convict. The Lady faces Eugene Dred after he molests the saloon owner's young daughter, eventually killing him. Upset, she rides out of town. Meanwhile, Cort duels a Native American gunslinger, Spotted Horse, but fails to kill him with the first shot and succeeds with a second bullet thrown by a spectator.

Doc Wallace finds The Lady at a nearby cemetery and tells her he recognizes her and knows why she is there. Flashbacks reveal that The Lady's real name is Ellen McKenzie. Her father was the marshal in Redemption until Herod's gang invaded and lynched him. Herod gave Ellen a pistol and three shots to try to break the rope, but she accidentally killed her father, after which she fled town. Doc hands Ellen her father's old badge and persuades her to help rid the town of Herod.

Before the semi-finals, the following day, Ellen challenges Herod, but he has already accepted a challenge from The Kid. As Ellen and Cort are the only fighters left, Herod orders them to fight, threatening to kill them if they refuse. Herod urges The Kid to withdraw, but he refuses. Although Herod is wounded, The Kid is fatally shot. Herod coldly refuses to take his hand as he dies, and says afterward it was never proven he was The Kid's father. When Cort and Ellen face off, Cort draws and fires on her, and Doc declares her dead. Cort angrily demands to fight Herod immediately, but he settles for dawn the next day. That night, Ratsy, one of Herod's men, breaks Cort's right hand.

Before the finals, the next morning, Herod rebukes Ratsy and kills him for harming Cort. Herod confesses that he is afraid of Cort, which is why he forced him to enter the tournament. As a matter of honor, he offers to fight Cort left-handed, but still instructs his henchmen to kill Cort if he wins. At the moment Herod draws, several buildings explode, including Herod's house and the clock tower. Ellen emerges from the smoke and flames, having faked her death and planted The Kid's dynamite with help from Cort and Doc. Cort kills Herod's remaining henchmen while Ellen faces off against Herod, revealing her identity by throwing her father's badge at his feet. Herod wounds Ellen, but she shoots him through the chest and kills him with a bullet to the eye. She tosses the badge to Cort and rides away, leaving him in charge of bringing law and order to Redemption.

== Cast ==
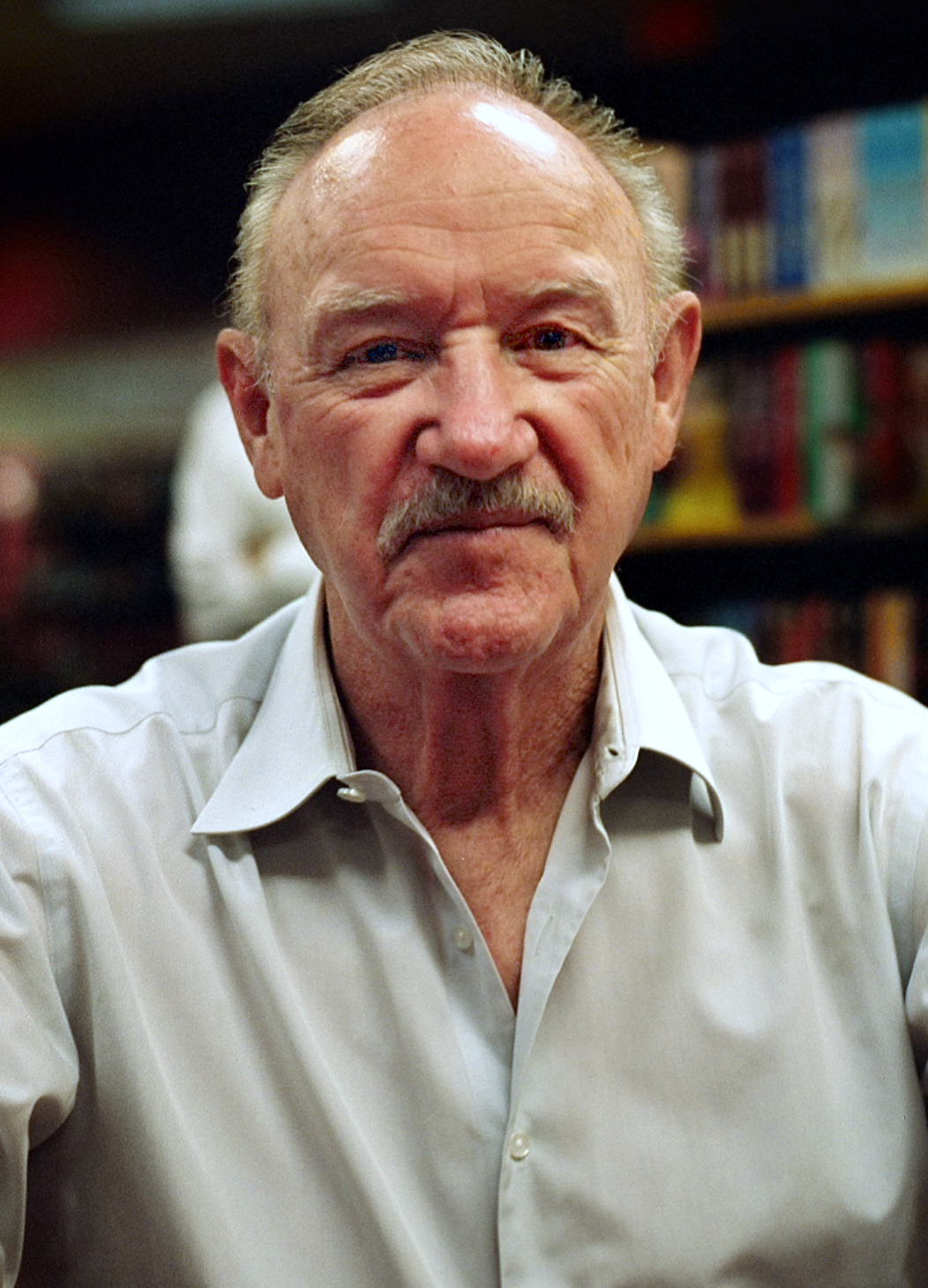
Gene Hackman portrayed John Herod, the film's main antagonist.

- Sharon Stone as Ellen "The Lady" McKenzie
  - Stacy Linn Ramsower as Young Ellen McKenzie
- Gene Hackman as John Herod
- Russell Crowe as Cort
- Leonardo DiCaprio as Fee "The Kid" Herod
- Pat Hingle as Horace Pinnick
- Kevin Conway as Eugene Dred
- Keith David as Sergeant Clay Cantrell
- Lance Henriksen as "Ace" Hanlon
- Mark Boone Junior as Scars
- Tobin Bell as Leonard "Dog" Kelly
- Raynor Scheine as Ratsy
- Lennie Loftin as Foy
- Fay Masterson as Mattie Silk
- Olivia Burnette as Katie Pinnick
- Roberts Blossom as "Doc" Walter Wallace
- Gary Sinise as Marshal McKenzie
- Sven-Ole Thorsen as "Swede" Gutzon
- David Cornell as "Simp" Dixon
- Josef Rainer as Virgil Sparks
- Arturo Gastelum as Carlos Montoya Castillo de Castillo
- Scott Spiegel as Gold Teeth Man
- Woody Strode as Charlie Moonlight
- Bruce Campbell as Wedding Shemp
- Jonothon Gill as Spotted Horse
- Jerry Swindall as The Blind Boy

== Production ==
=== Development ===
Writer Simon Moore finished his speculative script for The Quick and the Dead in late 1992, writing it as an homage to the spaghetti Westerns of Sergio Leone, particularly Once Upon a Time in the West and the Dollars Trilogy starring Clint Eastwood. The writer decided the lead character should be a female. "When you introduce women into that kind of world, something very interesting happens and you have an interesting dynamic straight away", Moore commented. The names of the lead villain (Herod) and the town (Redemption) were intentional allusions to the Bible. Moore considered directing his own script as an independent film and shooting The Quick and the Dead on a $3–4 million budget in either Spain or Italy.

Sony Pictures Entertainment purchased Moore's script in May 1993 and approached Sharon Stone, fresh off the success of Basic Instinct, to star in the lead role in July 1993. Because Stone also signed on as co-producer, she had approval of the choice of director. Sam Raimi was hired to direct because Stone was impressed with his work on Army of Darkness (1992); she made it clear that if he was not hired, she would quit the project. Although Stone had mixed emotions on Raimi's previous work, she believed in his ability to handle the campy tone of the film, feeling that The Quick and the Dead would be a perfect opportunity to "stretch the limits of his technical and creative ability". Moore was also enthusiastic over Raimi's hiring based on his previous work with the Evil Dead film series.

When Sony began fast-tracking development of The Quick and the Dead, the studio commissioned a series of rewrites from Moore. The writer was eventually dismissed and replaced with John Sayles, who, according to Moore, was chosen because the studio did not like the semi-serious tone and instructed him toward "making more of an American Old West film". Moore was rehired and filming was to begin in three weeks because Sayles's script was approaching a 2½-hour runtime. When rewriting the shooting script, Moore omitted Sayles's work without Sony noticing. A week before shooting, Sony considered the script good enough to shoot; Moore described the rewrites as "a completely fucking pointless exercise".

=== Filming ===
Russell Crowe originally auditioned for a different role in the film before Sharon Stone asked that the actor try for the lead male role. "When I saw Romper Stomper [1992], I thought Russell was not only charismatic, attractive and talented, but also fearless", Stone reasoned. "And I find fearlessness very attractive. I was convinced I wouldn't scare him." Raimi found Crowe to be "bold and challenging. He reminds me of what we imagine the American cowboy to have been like." On working with Raimi, Crowe later described the director as "sort of like the fourth Stooge".

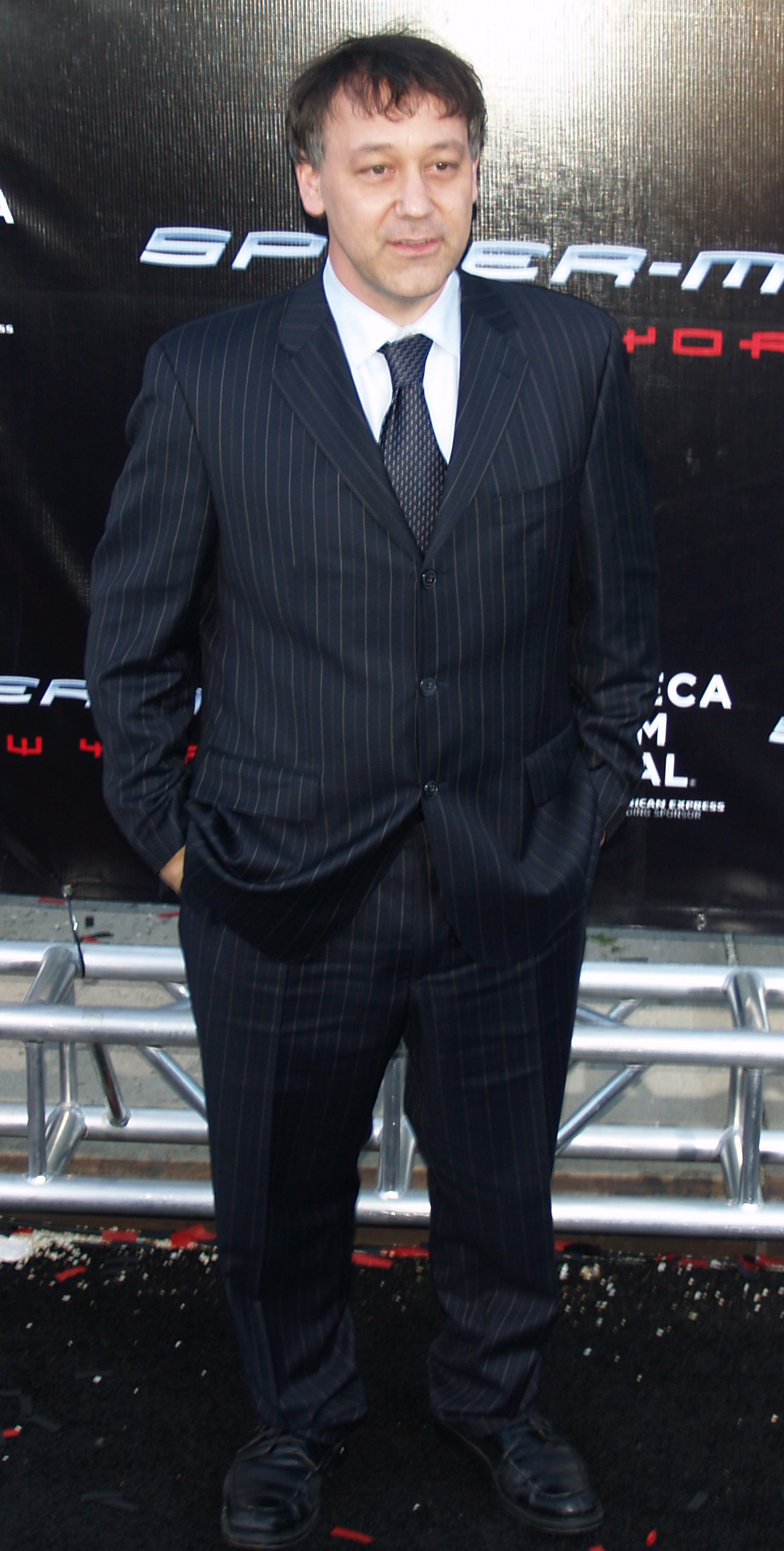
Director Sam Raimi

Sony Pictures had doubts with Stone's choice of Crowe because he was unknown to American audiences in the mid-1990s. To cast Gene Hackman in the role of Herod, TriStar Pictures changed the shooting location from Durango, Mexico, to Tucson, Arizona. Matt Damon auditioned for The Kid, but later declined as he thought that no would believed on a female gunslinger. Sam Rockwell also auditioned for The Kid, a role that ended up going to Leonardo DiCaprio. Sony was also hesitant about the inexperienced DiCaprio's casting; Stone compromised by paying his salary out of her own pocket.

Filming was originally to begin in October 1993 but was delayed because Crowe needed to finish a prior commitment in Australia. Principal photography for The Quick and the Dead lasted from November 21, 1993, to February 27, 1994. Locations included Old Tucson Studios in Arizona and Mescal, 40 miles (64 km) southeast of Tucson. Production was briefly halted at times over weather problems. Thell Reed, who was hired as the gun coach and weapons master, worked with the cast during three months of training. To age Cort's Colt 1851 Navy Revolver and the other guns used, Reed experimented with simple measures. "I took them out by my swimming pool and dipped them in chlorine water to let them rust", he explained. "They looked rusty and old, but were brand new guns." Such detail, including the nickel plating and ivory handles on Ellen's Colt Peacemakers, was accurate to the time period.

The town of Redemption was designed by Patrizia von Brandenstein, known for her work on Amadeus (1984) and The Untouchables (1987). Raimi's first choice as the visual effects supervisor was William Mesa, his collaborator on Darkman (1990) and Army of Darkness (1992). Instead, Sony chose The Computer Film Company to create the VFX sequences. Pick-up scenes took place in November and December 1994, including an extended duel between Sharon Stone and Gene Hackman.

Stone had a love scene with Crowe removed from the final cut before the film's release in the United States. The actress/co-producer thought the scene did not fit with the picture's established reality. It was included in overseas releases of the film, both theatrically and on home media.

=== Soundtrack ===
The original motion-picture soundtrack for The Quick and the Dead was released by the Varèse Sarabande music label on February 14, 1995. The score for the film was composed and conducted by Alan Silvestri and mixed by Dennis Sands. Kenneth Karman and Thomas Drescher edited the film's music.

The Quick and the Dead: Original Motion Picture Soundtrack

Film score by Alan Silvestri
- Released: February 14, 1995
- Length: 31:01
- Label: Varèse Sarabande

The Quick and the Dead: Original Motion Picture Soundtrack
No.	Title	Length
1.	"Redemption"	3:25
2.	"Gunfight Montage"	1:41
3.	"Couldn't Tell Us Apart"	1:17
4.	"John Herod"	1:21
5.	"Ellen's First Round"	1:10
6.	"Lady's the Winner"	0:47
7.	"Dinner Tonight"	2:11
8.	"Cort's Story"	1:02
9.	"Ellen vs. Dred"	1:10
10.	"Kid vs. Herod"	4:17
11.	"I Don't Wanna Die"	2:00
12.	"The Big Day"	2:27
13.	"Ellen Returns"	3:54
14.	"The Law's Come Back to Town"	0:49
15.	"The Quick and the Dead (End Credits)"	3:30
Total length:		31:01

== Release and reception ==
=== Box office ===
The Quick and the Dead was released in the US and Canada on February 10, 1995, in 2,158 theaters, earning $6,515,861 in its opening weekend, placing second at the US box office behind Billy Madison by $124,000. The film eventually grossed $18,636,537 at the US and Canadian box office. Writer Simon Moore noted the film performed modestly in Europe. The movie grossed $28 million outside the United States and Canada, for a worldwide gross of $47 million.

Director Sam Raimi described The Quick and the Dead as a pivotal but challenging experience. In a May 2009 interview with Empire magazine, he admitted, "I had a tremendous amount to learn about directing actors", realizing he had often treated them as "props to move about". Working with stars like Gene Hackman and Sharon Stone pushed him to evolve. On his bold visual style, he reflected, "I felt my style didn't help make it into a great picture". Previously, Raimi confessed feeling lost after the film: "I was very confused. For a number of years, I thought, 'I'm like a dinosaur.' I couldn't change with the material."

TriStar Pictures also showed The Quick and the Dead as an "out-of-competition" film at the May 1995 Cannes Film Festival. Additionally, Stone was nominated for the Saturn Award for Best Actress, but lost to Angela Bassett in Strange Days. A novelization written by Jack Curtis was published by HarperCollins in September 1995. The Region 1 DVD was released in September 1998.

=== Critical reception ===
The Quick and the Dead received mixed reviews from critics. On Rotten Tomatoes, the film holds an approval rating of 62%, based on 53 reviews, with an average rating of 6.10/10. The site's consensus states: "The Quick and the Dead isn't quite the draw that its intriguing premise and pedigree suggest, but fans of nontraditional Westerns should have some rootin', tootin' fun." Metacritic assigned the film a weighted average score of 49 out of 100, based on 21 reviews, indicating "mixed or average" reviews.

Janet Maslin of The New York Times praised Stone's performance and Raimi's directing. "Stone's presence nicely underscores the genre-bending tactics of Raimi, the cult filmmaker now doing his best to reinvent the B movie in a spirit of self-referential glee."

Roger Ebert of the Chicago Sun-Times criticized the film for being overtly clichéd, but praised Raimi's direction and Dante Spinotti's cinematography.

The cinematographer, Dante Spinotti (The Last of the Mohicans) makes the material look terrific. The lowering skies around the isolated town make it look ripe for vengeance of biblical proportions, and there are quiet satirical touches, as when a man stands in a saloon door and his shadow seems about 6 miles long.

— Roger Ebert, writing in the Chicago Sun-Times

Critic and Raimi biographer Bill Warren wrote that the film "is a very conscious (though not self-conscious) attempt to recreate some of the themes, style, and appeal of Sergio Leone's majestically operatic spaghetti Westerns of the 1960s, especially the Man with No Name trilogy that starred Clint Eastwood. It's brisker, more romantic, and somehow more American than Leone's movies."

Jonathan Rosenbaum of the Chicago Reader observed, "Raimi tries to do a Sergio Leone, and though The Quick and the Dead is highly enjoyable in spots, it doesn't come across as very convincing, perhaps because nothing can turn Sharon Stone into Charles Bronson."

Peter Travers of Rolling Stone felt that "The Quick and the Dead plays like a crazed compilation of highlights from famous Westerns. Raimi finds the right look, but misses the heartbeat. You leave the film dazed instead of dazzled, as if an expert marksman had drawn his gun, only to shoot himself in the foot."

=== Critical reassessment ===
Although having a mixed critical reception on release, The Quick and the Dead has received praise from Sam Raimi fans. Tom Reimann of Collider considers the film as one of Raimi's best movies: "The movie is so unabashedly bonkers that it’s impossible not to have a good time."

Scott Hallam of Dread Central praised Raimi's directing and versatility in multiple genres of film and the cast.

Jay Royston of WhatCulture praised the film and considered it one of Raimi's finest movies by saying, "...I have to put it in the top three Raimi movies, maybe because it is so unlike other Raimi films, yet combines all three of the best qualities of a director already mentioned; working with actors, innovating camera shots, and telling a good story visually."

Bill Gibron of PopMatters said, "This was the geek breaking point for many a certified Raimaniac. First off, it was a Western in the days when the genre was more or less struggling for life. In addition, it starred a yet to be hot Leonardo DiCaprio, a question mark named Russell Crowe, and the sexually inert Sharon Stone. About the only thing it had going for it was Raimi's manic direction, and even that seemed...showy. Still, in retrospect, this is a good film, undermined by forces outside itself."

Matt Schimkowitz of The A.V. Club praised the film: "With a cast like that, it's expected, but it's never been this stylish, original, and fun." Ben Travis of Empire magazine ranked it as Raimi's third-best movie: "It's a real sharp-shooter, an ultra-stylish shootout spectacular with a top cast, and some of his most creative camerawork."

Richard Schertzer of MovieWeb considered the film to be one of Raimi's best films: "With its energy, a subversive female lead from Stone, and its surprising violence, The Quick and the Dead makes for a strong entry in his repertoire as a filmmaker and a wondrous first time western for him."

Patrick Philips from Looper praised the movie and considered it a "cult classic": "Of all the films on Sam Raimi's delightfully left-of-center resume, this is the one that deserves to be rediscovered by the cinematic world – if only via midnight screenings." BJ Colangelo of /Film praised the movie and considered it one of Raimi's most underrated films: "There are enough dutch angle dolly zooms in this film to make someone feel disoriented, but it works. The Quick and the Dead has the heart of a classic Western, but revamped for modern audiences with snappier taste."

Film critic Adrian Martin remarked, "Sam Raimi's The Quick and the Dead is a feminist Western starring a gun-toting Sharon Stone. [There is] a terrific scene where Lady goes berserk and challenges a guy who has just sexually abused the teenage daughter of the sad saloonkeeper. Raimi takes us straight from Stone's split-second outburst of recognition to the sight of her racing forward in the pelting rain, both guns firing in righteous fury, screaming from the depths of her soul. Leone himself couldn't have done that bit any better."

After the release of Send Help, Matt Singer of ScreenCrush ranked the film eighth of the sixteen films directed by Raimi. Singer described the film as one of the most misunderstood movies of the 1990s, calling its initial reception "their worst blunder". He praised its ensemble cast, as well as Raimi's dynamic visual style and sharp frontier dialogue, arguing the film is far deeper and more accomplished than its reputation as a shallow, melodramatic Western suggests.

Vulture ranked the film fifth among Raimi's works, describing it as a maximalist and inventive take on the Western genre, praising its exaggerated visual style, inventive camerawork, and ensemble cast, and noting that Raimi "goes for broke" in staging each duel with distinct energy and creativity.

Alison Foreman of IndieWire ranked the film among the best of Raimi’s career, placing it tenth in his filmography. She described The Quick and the Dead as a "sideways Western" elevated by its experimental visual approach and Gene Hackman's "snarling, sadistic villainy", praising its genre-blending style, horror-inflected duels, and Sharon Stone's central revenge narrative, while noting that despite its box-office disappointment, the film remains an under-appreciated entry that "packs more than expected".

== See also ==
- 1995 in film
