= Mosaic (murder mystery) =

2017 interactive film and television series

- Developer: PodOp, Inc.
- Publisher: HBO
- Director: Steven Soderbergh
- Producer: Casey Silver
- Writer: Ed Solomon
- Platform(s): iOS, Android
- Release: iOS November 8, 2017; Android November 21, 2017; Website January 18, 2018; HBO January 22, 2018
- Genre(s): Interactive movie, murder mystery
- Starring: Sharon Stone, Garrett Hedlund, Jennifer Ferrin, Devin Ratray, Frederick Weller
- Country of origin: United States
- # of episodes: 6
- Original network: HBO
- Website: watchmosaic.com

Mosaic is a 2017 murder mystery by Steven Soderbergh, producer Casey Silver, and writer Ed Solomon, published via HBO. It was released in two forms: as an iOS/Android mobile app and as a 2018 television drama. The app works like an interactive film; while the user cannot affect the plot, they can choose from which perspective the same plot is viewed, and learn different facets of it. Users can also investigate on their own time background documents, emails, news clippings, voice mails, police reports, and the like in a "Discoveries" option.

HBO released Mosaic as a six-episode television series in January 2018. The television series contains largely the same content as the app, but without the interactivity or the ability to research documents, and is slightly shorter.

== Cast ==
- Olivia Lake (Sharon Stone), a children's book author and illustrator
- Joel Hurley (Garrett Hedlund), an aspiring artist who lives on Olivia's property
- Eric Neill (Frederick Weller), a con man and suitor to Olivia
- Petra Neill (Jennifer Ferrin), Eric's sister, who starts her own investigation to exonerate him
- Nate Henry (Devin Ratray), a local detective
- Laura Hurley (Maya Kazan), Joel's wife
- Alan Pape (Beau Bridges), a corrupt sheriff
- Michael O'Connor (James Ransone), a billionaire neighbor of Olivia's who was raised by her
- Frank Scott (Jeremy Bobb), Joel's best friend
- Melissa Henry (Zandy Hartig), Nate's wife
- Tom Davis (Michael Cerveris), Michael O'Connor's right-hand man
- JC Schiffer (Paul Reubens), Olivia's best friend and confidante
- Amy Lambson (Allison Tolman), Eric's attorney
- Tia (Bridey Elliott), a schoolteacher

== Plot and themes ==
Mosaic begins in a flashback to four years before the main events of the story. Eric Neill is attempting to seduce and defraud children's author Olivia Lake at the behest of some of his associates. In the present, Eric is in prison for Olivia's murder; Petra, Eric's sister, and others reopen the investigation into the events four years prior.

Writer Ed Solomon said that he tried to build the themes of Mosaic's structure into the narrative; he wrote "Every villain is the hero of their own story. This forced me to think of every character as being worthy of their own movie." Olivia's most famous book, in-setting, is supposed to be read both as a story of a hunter trying to protect his family from a bear as well as the story of a bear trying to protect his cubs from a hunter. The multiple viewpoints are intended to allow the user to understand all the sides.

== Production ==
The footage for Mosaic was largely filmed in Park City, Utah. The style and nature of the work meant that there was fairly little post-processing or special effects, and Soderbergh did not use many "takes", preferring to aim for a less rehearsed and more naturalistic feel.

== App ==
The main navigational flow between clips – seen content has a checkmark, new content is shown with viewpoint characters and titles, and future unlockable content only has a character-specific icon.

In the Mosaic app, all playthroughs start with the same introduction. After the prologue is watched, users can continue as either Joel or Eric; after that, the story branches further, allowing users to view from multiple character's perspectives. Notifications of additional content sometimes pop up, similar to app push notifications; they offer the ability to see a flashback, flash forward, or related document. The creators compared the "Discoveries" to the ability to turn to a glossary, map, or appendix in fantasy novels.

If all of the content is combined, Mosaic is said to be approximately seven and a half hours to watch and consume. It straddles the line between a television show and a video game. While the user can choose which of two perspectives to follow at various branch points, they are not "controlling" the characters, and the truth behind the murder is always the same.

The app was released on November 8, 2017, for iOS (iPhone, iPad, etc.) and for free. An Android version was released on November 21, 2017. A web app version for desktops and laptops using a web browser was released in January 2018, just before the television release.

In January 2019, both the app and the website were decommissioned and removed from app stores.

== Television episodes ==
No.	Title	Directed by	Written by	Original release date	US viewers (millions)
1	"Meet Olivia Lake"	Steven Soderbergh	Ed Solomon	January 22, 2018	0.273
2	"Moving Forward, Not Back"	Steven Soderbergh	Ed Solomon	January 23, 2018	0.071
3	"Zebra-Itis"	Steven Soderbergh	Ed Solomon	January 24, 2018	0.197
4	"Ilsa From Finland"	Steven Soderbergh	Ed Solomon	January 25, 2018	0.221
5	"The Reckoning"	Steven Soderbergh	Ed Solomon	January 26, 2018	0.229
6	"Fact and Fiction"	Steven Soderbergh	Ed Solomon	January 26, 2018	0.189

== Reception ==
TechCrunch praised the app's technical capabilities, saying it was intuitive and responsive. Sam Eichner of UrbanDaddy complimented the "sleek and intuitive" app as well as limiting repetition while still being understandable if the clips are watched in an unusual order, but felt that the different perspectives ultimately weren't different enough. Inkoo Kang of Slate was disappointed in the app, saying that she would likely have preferred the television cut and preferred tighter directorial vision over the freedom to accidentally miss important elements of the plot. Randall Colburn of The Guardian felt similarly; he compared Mosaic to large, sprawling games such as The Elder Scrolls series that don't force the player to go any one direction, but contain tons of side material. Colburn, while not directly criticizing the app as bad, felt that a tighter narrative focused on a good story would have been an improvement over the ability to freeform explore.

The television miniseries received positive reviews. On Metacritic, the series received a score of 73 out of 100 based on 19 reviews, indicating "generally favorable reviews". On Rotten Tomatoes, it has an approval rating of 79% with an average rating of 8.1 out of 10 based on 42 reviews. The site's critical consensus reads, "Mosaic has enough moving parts – and fine performances – to deliver a gratifying murder-mystery plot, though its jumbled structure and heavy-handed narrative may still leave viewers slightly wanting." Stone received critical acclaim for her performance. Rob Sheffield of Rolling Stone called Mosaic "Sharon Stone's best role in ages" and praised the show for keeping the feeling of the viewer being a detective attempting to puzzle out the truth based on a multitude of accounts. Variety praised Weller's performance as Eric and called Mosaic a solid mystery-thriller. The A.V. Club praised the series as one of the best of 2018 and compared it to "a particularly good Robert Altman film" in how it covered the side characters with as much interest as the hunt for the killer. New York magazine was more reserved in its praise, saying that while the show was intriguing, it was not until the third episode of the television series that it began to really work, and required patience on the part of the viewer.

At the 23rd Satellite Awards, Sharon Stone won the award for Best Supporting Actress – Series, Miniseries or Television Film.

== Home media ==
The series was released on Blu-ray and DVD on July 10, 2018.

== Legacy ==
As of 2017, Soderbergh had two more unnamed interactive storytelling projects under development based on the same platform created for Mosaic, but as of 2024, there has been no further information on the status of these projects. PodOp's website went down at some point after January 2023.
