= Allan Quatermain and the Lost City of Gold =

1986 film by Gary Nelson

- Theatrical release poster
- Directed by: Gary Nelson
- Screenplay by: Gene Quintano; Lee Reynolds
- Based on: Allan Quatermain; 1887 novel H. Rider Haggard
- Produced by: Yoram Globus; Menahem Golan
- Starring: Richard Chamberlain; Sharon Stone; James Earl Jones; Henry Silva; Robert Donner
- Cinematography: Frederick Elmes; Alex Phillips
- Edited by: Gary Griffen; Alain Jakubowicz; Dan Loewenthal
- Music by: Michael Linn
- Distributed by: Cannon Film Distributors
- Release dates: December 18, 1986 (West Germany); January 30, 1987 (United States)
- Running time: 99 minutes
- Country: United States
- Language: English
- Budget: $13 million
- Box office: $3.8 million (US) (sub-total)

Allan Quatermain and the Lost City of Gold is a 1986 American adventure comedy film directed by Gary Nelson and released in West Germany on December 18, 1986, and in the United States on January 30, 1987. It is loosely based on the 1887 novel Allan Quatermain by H. Rider Haggard. It is the sequel to the 1985 film King Solomon's Mines. The role of Allan Quatermain is reprised by Richard Chamberlain, as is that of Jesse Huston by Sharon Stone.

Upon its release in January 1987, Allan Quatermain and the Lost City of Gold was poorly received by critics. Plans for further sequels were shelved in light of its commercial failure.

== Plot ==
After surviving their expedition to King Solomon's Mines, Allan Quatermain and Jesse Huston have settled down in colonial Africa. They are engaged to be married and Jesse plans to travel to America for the wedding, but Quatermain is restless.

A man chased by two strange masked men emerges from the jungle, and is recognized as one of Quatermain's friends Dumont. He is delirious and is cared for by Jesse and Quatermain, but at night, his pursuers return to kill him. Before he dies, Dumont tells Quatermain that his brother Robeson, supposedly lost, is alive, and that they have found the legendary "Lost City of Gold". Quatermain immediately starts preparing for an expedition to find Robeson. Jesse is furious and stalks off, but then realizes how important this is to Quatermain.

Quatermain and Jesse are assisted by Umslopogaas, a fearless warrior and old friend of Quatermain's, to put together an expedition. Swarma, a spiritual guru, and five Askari warriors accompany them. The group crosses a desert and reaches the Walls of Japora. Two Askari are lost when Swarma trips a boobytrap that opens a pit under the road to the city. Another member of the party is lost when savage Eshowe warriors attack the group. Many spears are thrown at Quatermain and his friends, but Umslopogaas deflects most of them with his giant axe. The remaining Askaris are lost in a subterranean river.

Quatermain and his friends indeed discover the city. The inhabitants, both black and white, are friendly, and Quatermain meets with Robeson, seemingly in good health and at peace in the society. The city has two queens — the noble and beloved Nyleptha and her power-hungry sister Sorais. But the real leader is the evil High Priest Agon, feared by all.

Quatermain raises the population against Agon and Sorais, who musters an army to recover the city by force. Quatermain realizes that they can make all the weapons they need out of gold, which is mined by the population. The final battle ends when, atop the temple, during a lightning storm, Quatermain uses Umslopogaas' axe to channel the lightning and melt the gold, causing it to flow off the side of the structure and pour over the attacking horde, turning Agon and his army into gold statues.

Afterwards, Shawarma finally reveals himself and asking some water, and only to be thrown by Umslopogaas into the water fountain as the crowd laughing. Quatermain and Jesse finally kiss and celebrates their victory.

== Cast ==
- Richard Chamberlain as Allan Quatermain
- Sharon Stone as Jesse Huston
- James Earl Jones as Umslopogaas
- Henry Silva as Agon
- Robert Donner as Swarma
- Larbi Doghmi as Nasta
- Aileen Marson as Queen Nyleptha
- Cassandra Peterson as Queen Sorais
- Martin Rabbett as Robeson Quatermain
- Rory Kilalea as Dumont
- George Chiota as George
- Alex Heyns as Dutchman
- Stuart Goakes as Trader
- Themsi Times as Nurse
- Philip Boucher as Bartender
- Nic Lesley as Arab
- Fidelis Cheza as Eshowe Chief

== Production ==
The film was made simultaneously with its predecessor, King Solomon's Mines, although it was released a couple of years later. Despite the tremendous liberties both films took with the source material, being more similar in tone to the Indiana Jones film series, Allan Quatermain and the Lost City of Gold was loosely based, mostly, on the book sequel of H. Rider Haggard's King Solomon's Mines, entitled simply Allan Quatermain. In that book, which depicts Allan Quatermain's last adventure, although it is just the second in the series of novels, the character and his associates go searching for a lost white tribe in Africa, and end up involved in a war between the rival queens of the kingdom. An opulent set was constructed for the film just outside Victoria Falls.

=== Music ===
The film features just over half an hour of original music written by Michael Linn; for financial reasons, the producers reused material composed by Jerry Goldsmith for the first film (although Linn's score does use Goldsmith's main theme), supplemented with music composed for other productions from Cannon Films.

The score was initially released by Silva Screen in 1988 on a CD with cues from Manifesto (scored by Nicola Piovani), Making the Grade (Basil Poledouris), Doin' Time on Planet Earth (Dana Kaproff) and The Seven Magnificent Gladiators (Dov Seltzer); in 2009 it was issued on its own album by La-La Land Records. Cues in italics contain material composed by Jerry Goldsmith.

1. Train Delivery/Don't Fool With Quatermain (1:48)
2. Quatermain Shows Off (1:53)
3. Quatermain Meets Swarmi/Dumont Dies (3:20)
4. The Ruse (2:53)
5. Jessie Fingered (2:07)
6. Umslopogaas (3:27)
7. Earthquake (2:57)
8. Quatermain Leaves Akawi (1:40)
9. Worms (1:12)
10. Love Scene (3:02)
11. Agon Wants Revenge (5:04)
12. Dumont's Gold City/Coda (3:11)

== Release ==
The film debuted at number seven at the box office during its first week, earning $2 million. It was a box office disappointment, one of several that led to Cannon Films reporting a loss in early 1987.

"I know it went through town pretty fast", said Richard Chamberlain. "I know my family didn't like it much. My father was too ill to see it, but my mother said, 'Richard, the advertising was all wrong. They should have told people it was funny.' But I don't think it hurt my chances for other movies. I know a lot of people who do a lot of movies, and some of them are good and some of them aren't. Michael Caine's one example. He's wonderful in some movies and forgettable in others. I think as long as you're doing generally good work that you enjoy, things will be okay."

== Reception ==
The Boston Globe film critic wrote "there's nothing new under the broiling afternoon sun. It's the same: washed-out scenery, stale dialogue and lackluster performances... Except for the presence of James Earl Jones doing a depressing turn as a native chieftain, Allan Quatermain is just for folks who don't mind mining for fool's gold." The New York Times said the film was "of minor academic interest. Those who take the Spielberg special effects for granted are sure to learn a lot by watching these same tricks done badly... Fortunately, Richard Chamberlain is professional and then some, since the film would otherwise be virtually unwatchable." The Los Angeles Times said the "movie seems largely aimed at fans who can't wait for the next installment of Raiders of the Lost Ark. Unfortunately, most of the battle scenes were... ineptly staged... Chamberlain has none of the breezy, irreverence that made Harrison Ford's Indiana Jones such a delightful hero. In his Banana Republic khaki duds and a bullet-proof undershirt, he exudes the dashing spirit of a game-show host. The rest of the cast is good largely for unintentional laughs."

=== Criticism of racism ===
Based on a 19th-century novel that, though acceptable at its time, in retrospect may contain some racist attitudes, the film itself has been criticized for conveying some of these same racist themes. The book Africans and the Politics of Popular Culture provides a harsh critique saying it reached "levels of racism unachieved since the 1930s." Though the film has been portrayed as a comedy and a satire not all critics have been satisfied that the racist themes are excused under this pretense.

== Abandoned sequels ==
The Cannon Group originally planned a trilogy of films, the third film to be an adaptation of She and Allan but this was ultimately abandoned after the poor reception of Allan Quatermain and the Lost City of Gold, coupled with the financial difficulties of the company at that time.

In 2011, a new sequel was proposed by Menahem Golan, called Allan Quatermain and the Jewel of the East. The script was written by Golan and Richard Albiston and was to be directed by Golan. The plot concerned Quatermain attempting to rescue his daughter from Chinese treasure hunters in the Congo. According to the 2015 documentary Golan: A Farewell to Mr Cinema, Richard Chamberlain had agreed to return as the title character, but Golan died before the film began shooting.

== Home media ==
MGM released the film on DVD on February 10, 2004. A Blu-ray edition followed in March 2015.
