= Last Dance (1996 film) =

- Theatrical release poster
- Directed by: Bruce Beresford
- Screenplay by: Ron Koslow
- Story by: Steven Haft; Ron Koslow
- Produced by: Steven Haft
- Starring: Sharon Stone; Rob Morrow; Randy Quaid; Peter Gallagher; Jack Thompson
- Cinematography: Peter James
- Edited by: John Bloom
- Music by: Mark Isham
- Production company: Touchstone Pictures
- Distributed by: Buena Vista Pictures Distribution
- Release date: May 3, 1996
- Running time: 103 minutes
- Country: United States
- Language: English
- Budget: $41 million
- Box office: $5,939,449 (USA subtotal)

Last Dance is a 1996 crime drama thriller film directed by Bruce Beresford and starring Sharon Stone, Rob Morrow, Randy Quaid and Peter Gallagher.

== Plot ==
In an unnamed Southern U.S. state, Cindy Liggett is waiting on death row having been found guilty of the brutal double murder she committed in her teens, 12 years earlier. Rick Hayes is appointed to the Clemency board by his brother John Hayes.

Rick meets Sam Burns his boss who assigns Rick Cindy's case as a candidate for clemency. Sam takes Rick to meet the despondent Cindy who has seemingly accept her fate. Rick learns that Cindy has exhausted all legal options and has just been given her 30 day death sentence. Rick starts to look into Cindy's case and returns to visit her where he is told she doesn't want clemency as all it would do is convert her death sentence to life in prison with no parole. Rick also discovers that the governor has never granted clemency in a death sentence.

Rick sends Cindy on a picture of the Taj Mahal and then goes to try and help her get Clemency. He speak with Cindy's family where he is shocked to be stonewalled. Unperturbed he meets her former boyfriend Doug who testified against her in her original case. After a back and forth the vicious Doug assaults Rick. Sam becomes infuriated when he learns of Rick's assault and reassigns him to another case.

Rick then meets with John Henry Reese a seemingly reformed and now educated prisoner. Rick learns the decision for Clemency falls between Cindy and John Henry. As he leaves the prison, Rick bumps into Cindy and he encourages her to fight for her life. Rick approaches Sam who reluctantly agrees to let Rick continue investigating. Rick approaches the victims' mother who seems to have forgiven Cindy, however she declines to sign a statement outlining her forgiveness even though she is not in favour of the death sentence. The remaining victim's father staunchly outlines that he wants to see Cindy put to death.

Rick continues to investigate but time ticks away. Eventually Cindy has a flashback where she is smoking crack with Doug when they approach a seemingly empty house after dark to commit a burglary. As they go through the rooms Cindy is shocked to find the two teenagers in bed together. Cindy is verbally attacked and remembers herself hitting one of the teenagers with a crowbar, confirming that she is indeed guilty of her crime.

Rick uncovers evidence that Cindy's defence was hampered and he attempts to find Judge Gorman to get a final stay of execution. He finds the judge deep in the Florida glades and returns to Cindy. They enjoy her final meal and Sam manages to find her younger brother Billy. Cindy has a final touching conversation with Billy.

Cindy seems to accept her fate and proceeds to the chamber and is strapped down, in preparation for her execution. Before it can be carried out a last-minute stay is granted for her case to be reviewed by an appeals panel. Unfortunately, a short time later her death sentence proceeds. Afterward, Rick discovers an intricate drawing of the Taj Mahal Cindy had made among the artwork that was created while she was incarcerated. The film ends with Rick on a trip to India to visit the Taj Mahal after Cindy's execution.

== Cast ==
- Sharon Stone as Cindy Liggett
- Rob Morrow as Rick Hayes
- Randy Quaid as Sam Burns
- Peter Gallagher as John Hayes
- Jack Thompson as The Governor
- Jayne Brook as Jill
- Pamala Tyson as Linda, Legal Aid Attorney
- Skeet Ulrich as Billy Liggett
- Don Harvey as Doug
- Diane Sellers as Inmate Reggie
- Patricia French as Guard Frances
- Ralph Wilcox as Warden Rice
- Buck Ford as District Attorney Rusk
- Dave Hager as Detective Vollo
- Christine Cattell as Louise
- Peg Allen as Helen
- Charles S. Dutton (uncredited) as John Henry Reese

== Production ==
Last Dance was filmed on location across the states of Kentucky, South Carolina, and Tennessee.

== Critical reception ==
The film was largely ignored at the box office, and suffered in comparison to the 1995 film Dead Man Walking, which was an Academy Award–winning drama whose treatment of the death penalty theme was still fresh in the minds of audiences.

Last Dance received negative reviews from critics. It currently holds a 30% rating on Rotten Tomatoes based on 23 reviews, with an average rating of 5.2/10. Sharon Stone was nominated for a Razzie Award for Worst New Star (as the new serious Sharon Stone) for this film and Diabolique, where she lost to Pamela Anderson for Barb Wire.

Roger Ebert of the Chicago Sun-Times felt the film handled "potentially powerful material thoughtfully" and made a "good showcase for Stone". However, he pointed out that the film suffered from the "inescapable misfortune" of being following too soon after the "unquestioned masterpiece" of Dead Man Walking. In comparison, Ebert felt Last Dance "comes across as earnest but unoriginal". James Berardinelli of ReelViews also felt Dead Man Walking was "far superior". He felt Last Dance was a "less compelling tale" and "a little too safe", with "a little too much manipulation and melodrama". He praised Stone as giving the "most impressive performance of a rather lackluster career", but criticized Morrow as "leav[ing] something to be desired". He concluded that Last Dance is "perfectly watchable, and even worth a marginal recommendation, [but] in comparison to Dead Man Walking, it feels diluted."

Janet Maslin of The New York Times praised Stone's "stellar presence and surprisingly intense performance" in the film, describing her "dead-end role" as the film's "lifesaver". However, she was critical of the overall film, stating: "...soon the story begins taking sentimental turns, and even Ms. Stone's startling ferocity gets buried in sludge." Peter Travers of Rolling Stone was critical of the film and concluded: "Last Dance is a prison melodrama that embraces all the cliches that Dead Man Walking artfully dodged. Last Dance acts tough, but its heart is pure soap opera." Desson Howe of The Washington Post was also critical of the film, suggesting that the film "isn't quite 'Dumb Blonde Walking', but that satirical slur isn't so far off the mark". He described the film as "formulaic" with a "strangely distancing" emotional effect.

Barbara Shulgasser of the San Francisco Chronicle described the film as "simplistic, puerile rubbish", adding that Stone needed to "start picking difficult material if she really wants to become an actress". Edward Guthmann of the same newspaper felt the film had "able" direction and acting, but that Dead Man Walking was "far superior". He praised Stone's performance, but added: "The moments when Last Dance doesn't gloss over Stone's character are the best, and they make you wish the movie had been restructured." He described the film as an "earnest, unremarkable addition to the Hollywood canon of prison movies". Anne Billson of the UK newspaper The Daily Telegraph felt Stone "emerges from this enterprise with a certain amount of dignity", unlike Morrow, who is given "a wilfully unsympathetic role". She described the film as providing the "usual compendium of clichés".
