= Catherine Tramell =

Basic Instinct character

- Basic Instinct character
- Stone as Tramell in Basic Instinct
- First appearance: Basic Instinct (1992)
- Last appearance: Basic Instinct 2 (2006)
- Created by: Joe Eszterhas
- Portrayed by: Sharon Stone

Catherine Tramell is a fictional character and the main antagonist of the film Basic Instinct (1992) and its sequel Basic Instinct 2 (2006). Tramell, created by writer Joe Eszterhas, is played by Sharon Stone in both films. Tramell is considered to be one of Stone's most iconic roles, with Stone describing Tramell to be her most famous and relevant character. Tramell was nominated for the American Film Institute's list of the "Best Villains", and was named one of the greatest characters by Entertainment Weekly in 2010.

== Appearances ==
=== Basic Instinct ===
Basic Instinct establishes Tramell as a beautiful, wealthy heiress and successful crime novelist who is connected to the violent stabbing death of a washed-up rock musician, Johnny Boz, who was found in his bed tied to the bed posts with a white silk scarf. She is subsequently investigated by San Francisco Police Department homicide detectives Nick Curran and Gus Moran, who learn that Boz died in exactly the same manner as a character in Tramell's most recent novel. Tramell shows little emotion upon hearing of Boz's death, and under questioning by the police, behaves provocatively; in the film's most famous scene, Tramell recrosses her legs to show that she is not wearing underwear beneath her short skirt.

Curran looks into Tramell's troubled history and links her to the deaths of her wealthy parents, who died in a boating accident), her counselor at UC Berkeley, who was also killed with an ice pick in an unsolved homicide, and her former fiancé, a famous boxer, who died in the ring. She also has a habit of befriending imprisoned murderers such as her girlfriend Roxy, who killed her brothers as a teenager, and Hazel Dobkins, an elderly woman who killed her husband and children for no apparent reason. However, when he confronts Tramell, she taunts him with knowledge of his drug addiction and his killing of two tourists on assignment while high on cocaine. Thinking that Tramell received the confidential information from an adversarial internal affairs investigator, Marty Nilsen, a violent Curran gets himself suspended and falls into a drunken stupor. After Nilsen is found dead, he becomes the prime suspect. Curran, increasingly seduced by Tramell, becomes sexually involved with her; she tells him that he will be the basis of the character in her next novel.

A torrid affair between Tramell and Curran begins with the air of a cat-and-mouse game. Curran shows up at a club and witnesses her sniffing cocaine in a bathroom stall. Later, they have aggressive sex at Tramell's apartment. Roxy, jealous of Nick's relationship with Catherine, unsuccessfully attempts to kill Curran and dies in a car crash. Tramell's apparent grief over Roxy's death leads Curran to doubt her guilt. Curran then learns that as a college student, Tramell had a lesbian encounter with Elisabeth Garner, a police psychologist with whom he previously had an affair. Upon finding the manuscript to Tramell's latest novel, and reading the final pages where the fictional detective finds his partner's dead body, Curran realizes that Moran is in danger. He is too late to stop Moran's apparent murder by Garner, whom he shoots when he thinks she is retrieving a weapon. Evidence collected in Garner's apartment points to her as the killer of Boz, Nilsen, Moran, and her own husband. She is ultimately branded as the killer.

Curran is left confused and dejected, knowing from the manuscript that Tramell, at least must have known more about Moran's murder. When he tries to confront her after returning to his apartment, the two end up having sex. During a session of pillow talk where they discuss their future, Tramell reaches for something under the bed before abruptly resuming sex. The camera pans below the bed to show an ice pick lying on the floor.

=== Basic Instinct 2 ===
In Basic Instinct 2, set fourteen years after the events of the first movie, Tramell speeds through London in a sports car with Kevin Franks, an English football player. After taking Franks' hand to masturbate herself and reach orgasm, Tramell crashes the car into the River Thames. She attempts to save her partner, but she says in the subsequent scene, "When it came down to it, I guess my life was more important to me than his." When Tramell's interrogator, Metropolitan Police Detective Superintendent Roy Washburn, finds evidence of her culpability in the death, Tramell is made to attend therapy sessions with a court-appointed psychologist, Dr. Michael Glass. At her trial, Glass testifies that Tramell is a narcissist who suffers from a pathological "risk addiction", showing no regard for right or wrong. But Glass' testimony is deemed insufficient and Tramell goes free.

Tramell begins playing mind games with Glass, who finds himself becoming both frustrated and increasingly intrigued by her, although he has just begun an affair with another psychiatrist. He eventually succumbs to temptation and begins an illicit affair with Tramell. Meanwhile, the journalist boyfriend of Glass's ex-wife, who was writing a story criticizing Glass, is found strangled to death. More murders occur around Dr. Glass, including the killing of his ex-wife. His obsession with Tramell grows, and he is increasingly unable to distinguish between right and wrong. When the police begin to suspect him of the murders, he suggests to Superintendent Washburn that Tramell is the real killer attempting to frame him. He confronts Tramell at her apartment, where they have passionate sex. Tramell gives Glass a copy of the draft of her next novel, titled The Analyst. After reading it, he realizes that Tramell has novelised most of the recent events, with Glass and herself as characters. A character based on Glass's female colleague, Dr. Milena Gardosh, is depicted as the next murder victim in the novel.

Glass runs to Dr. Gardosh's apartment, finding Tramell already there. Gardosh informs him that he is no longer in charge of Tramell's therapy and that his license will be revoked. He and Gardosh struggle, and she is knocked unconscious. Tramell then threatens Glass with a gun she carries, but Glass confiscates it from her. When Detective Superintendent Washburn arrives at the scene, Glass shoots him and points the gun at Tramell before police tackle him. Later, Tramell visits Glass, now apparently insensible and institutionalised at a mental hospital. She tells him that her novel has become a best seller. Tramell suggests that Glass used her proximity to him as an excuse to murder his enemies, intending to frame her; flashbacks show Glass committing the murders. She says she suspects he is faking insanity and gives him a copy of the book with the inscription "I could not have done it without you". Tramell kisses him and leaves, and Glass begins to smile.

== Personality ==
In Basic Instinct, Catherine is a rare example of a female sociopath in popular culture. A charismatic, seductive, manipulative, and narcissistic author and serial-killer, she manipulates and causes the deaths of almost everyone in the story, including many of her lovers and her own parents, largely for her own personal gain, amusement and to inspire her novels with no real remorse whatsoever at all. She is even described as a "sociopath" by multiple other characters in the films.

Despite the fact that Catherine is apparently a monster who enjoys killing other individuals, because she likes to do it and likes to mess with the minds of others and exploit them for her personal gain. Despite her freely admitting she has never truly loved Johnny Boz, she freaks out over Roxy's death and changes her mind about ending her romantic and sexual relationship with Nick Curran, because her romantic feelings towards Nick has become too strong for her to resist and decides she does not want to be without him at all, even though she had initially and secretly considered killing him just for it. There is also the possibility that she was scorned by Beth Garner and murdered her husband as a result.

In Basic Instinct 2, Catherine is described as a "pathological liar" with her being diagnosed as a psychopath with narcissistic and borderline features by psychologist, Michael Glass, he explains; "inside i believe she vacillates between a feeling of godlike omnipotence and a sense that she simply does not exist, which of course is intolerable. I believe Ms. Tramell's behavior is driven by what we might call a risk addiction. A compulsive need to prove to herself that she can take risks and survive dangers that other individuals cannot. Especially the subsequent encounters with the police, the powers that be. The greater the risk, the greater the proof of her omnipotence. All addiction is progressive, the addict will always need to take greater and greater risks. I suspect the only limit for her would be her own death".

== Catherine Tramell's victims ==
Murders committed by Catherine Tramell
Name	Relationship	Method	Catherine's motive
Deaths before Basic Instinct
Marvin and Elaine Tramell	Catherine's parents	Boat explosion	To see if she could get away with it; inheritance
Noah Goldstein	Catherine's college counselor	Stabbed with an ice pick	Unknown; possibly sexual sadism
Joseph Garner	Elizabeth Garner's husband	Shot during a drive-by shooting	Setting up Elizabeth to frame her as a murderer
Deaths during Basic Instinct
Johnny Boz	Catherine's lover	Stabbed with an ice pick during sexual intercourse	Unknown; possibly sexual sadism
Lieutenant Marty Nilsen	SFPD Internal Affairs officer	Shot in the head	To put Nick in the same situation as her
Detective Gus Moran	Nick's partner	Stabbed with an ice pick in an elevator	To frame Elizabeth as a scapegoat for her crimes
Dr. Elizabeth Garner	Nick's psychologist and former lover	Shot to death by Nick	Possibly not planned; successfully implicates Beth in the series of murders
