= Demi Moore filmography =

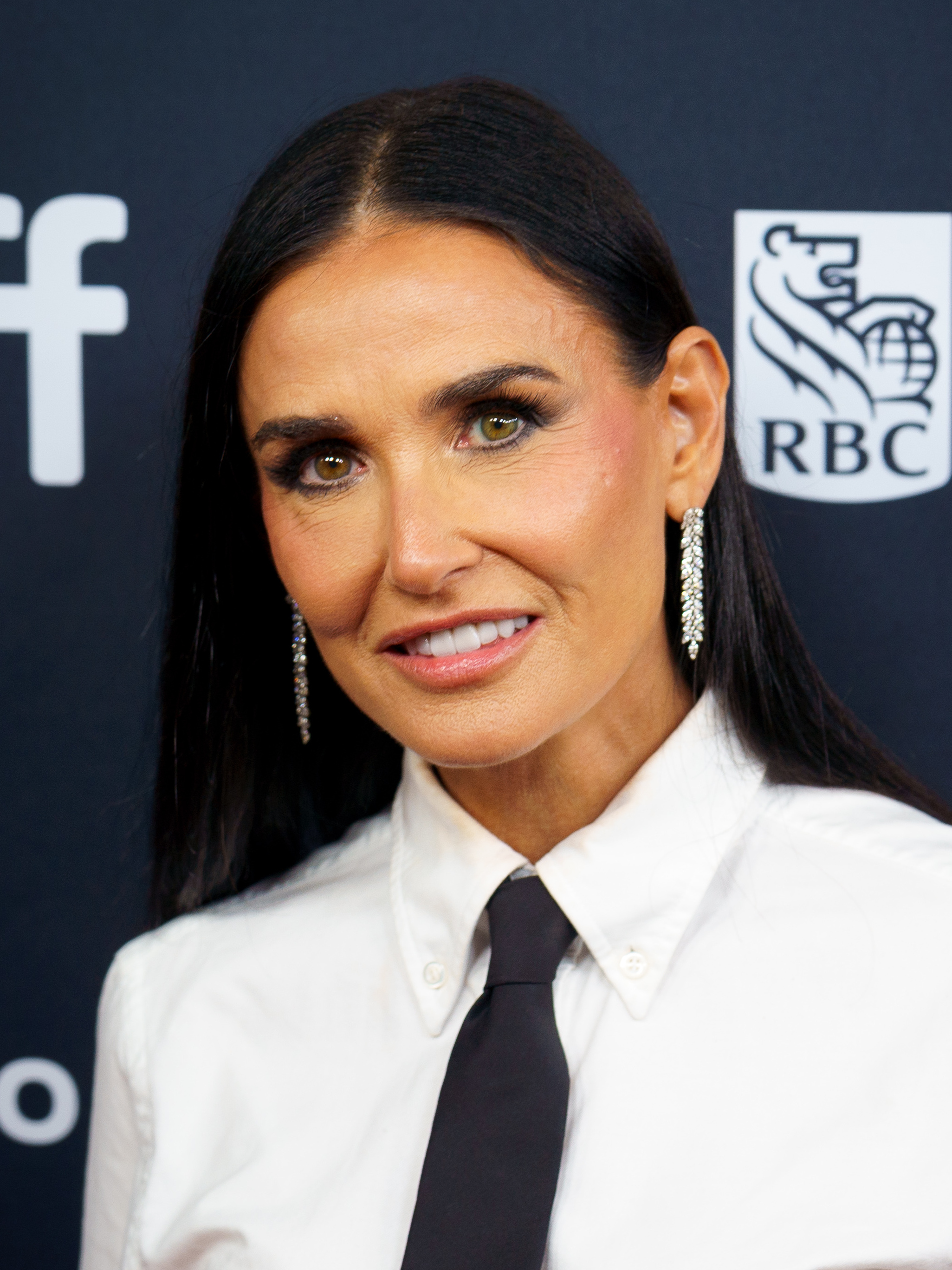
Moore in 2024

American actress Demi Moore made her film debut in 1981 and joined the cast of the daytime soap opera General Hospital that same year. After departing the show in 1983, she came to prominence as a member of the Brat Pack with roles in Blame It on Rio (1984), St. Elmo's Fire (1985), and About Last Night... (1986). Moore established herself as a bankable star with Ghost, the highest-grossing film of 1990. Her performance was praised and earned her a Golden Globe Award nomination. She had further box office success in the early 1990s with A Few Good Men (1992), Indecent Proposal (1993), and Disclosure (1994).

In 1996, Moore became the highest-paid actress in film history when she received an unprecedented $12.5 million to star in Striptease. The large-budget starring vehicles The Scarlet Letter (1995), The Juror (1996), and G.I. Jane (1997) fell below commercial expectations and contributed to a downturn in her career. She has since held sporadic leading roles in the arthouse films Passion of Mind (2000), Flawless (2008), and Blind (2016), as well as supporting roles in Charlie's Angels: Full Throttle (2003), Bobby (2006), Mr. Brooks (2007), Margin Call (2011) and Rough Night (2017).

In 2024, Moore received widespread acclaim for her performance in the body horror film The Substance, which premiered at the Cannes Film Festival. Hailed by critics as a bold career resurgence, her role was praised for its physical intensity and emotional depth. Moore won the Critics Choice Award, Golden Globe Award, and Screen Actors Guild Award for Best Actress, and received additional nominations for the Academy Award, BAFTA Award, and Film Independent Spirit Award. Moore's primetime television work includes the cable anthology If These Walls Could Talk (1996) and the streaming series Brave New World (2020). She also had a recurring role on Empire (2015–2017) and portrayed Ann Woodward in the limited series Feud: Capote vs. The Swans (2024).

== Cinema ==
Key
†	Denotes works that have not yet been released

=== Film ===
Year	Title	Role	Notes	Refs.
1981	Choices	Corri		
1982	Parasite	Patricia Welles		
1982	Young Doctors in Love	New Intern	Uncredited	
1984	Blame It on Rio	Nicole "Nikki" Hollis		
1984	No Small Affair	Laura Victor		
1985	St. Elmo's Fire	Jules		
1986	About Last Night...	Debbie Sullivan		
1986	One Crazy Summer	Cassandra Eldridge		
1986	Wisdom	Karen Simmons		
1988	The Seventh Sign	Abby Quinn		
1989	We're No Angels	Molly		
1990	Ghost	Molly Jensen		
1991	Nothing but Trouble	Diane Lightson		
1991	Mortal Thoughts	Cynthia Kellogg	Also producer	
1991	The Butcher's Wife	Marina Lemke		
1992	A Few Good Men	LCDR JoAnne Galloway		
1993	Indecent Proposal	Diana Murphy		
1994	Disclosure	Meredith Johnson		
1995	The Scarlet Letter	Hester Prynne		
1995	Now and Then	Samantha Albertson (older)	Also producer	
1996	The Juror	Annie Laird		
1996	The Hunchback of Notre Dame	Esmeralda	Voice	
1996	Striptease	Erin Grant		
1996	Beavis and Butt-Head Do America	Dallas Grimes	Voice	
1997	Austin Powers: International Man of Mystery	—N/a	Producer only	
1997	G.I. Jane	Lieutenant Jordan O'Neil	Also producer	
1997	Deconstructing Harry	Helen		
1999	Austin Powers: The Spy Who Shagged Me	—N/a	Producer only	
2000	Passion of Mind	Martha Marie / 'Marty' Talridge		
2002	Austin Powers in Goldmember	—N/a	Producer only	
2002	The Hunchback of Notre Dame II	Esmeralda	Voice; direct-to-video	
2003	Charlie's Angels: Full Throttle	Madison Lee		
2003	Grand Theft Parsons	—N/a	Special Thanks only	
2006	Half Light	Rachel Carlson		
2006	Bobby	Virginia Fallon		
2007	Flawless	Laura Quinn		
2007	Mr. Brooks	Detective Tracy Atwood		
2008	My Best Friend's Girl	—N/a	Special Thanks only	
2009	Happy Tears	Laura		
2009	The Joneses	Kate Jones		
2010	Bunraku	Alexandra		
2011	Margin Call	Sarah Robertson		
2011	Another Happy Day	Patty		
2011	Nepal's Stolen Children	Narrator	Voice; documentary	
2012	LOL	Anne Williams		
2013	Very Good Girls	Kate Fields		
2015	Forsaken	Mary-Alice Watson		
2016	Wild Oats	Crystal		
2016	Blind	Suzanne Dutchman		
2017	Rough Night	Lea		
2018	Love Sonia	Selma		
2019	Corporate Animals	Lucy		
2020	Songbird	Piper Griffin		
2022	Please Baby Please	Maureen		
2022	The Unbearable Weight of Massive Talent	Olivia Cage		
2024	The Substance	Elisabeth Sparkle		
2024	Brats	Herself	Documentary	
2025	The Tiger	Barbara Gucci	Short film	
2026	I Love Boosters	Christie Smith		
TBA	Tyrant †	TBA	Post-production	

== Television ==
Television films
Year	Title	Role	Notes
1984	Bedrooms	Nancy	
1996	If These Walls Could Talk	Claire Donnelly	
1997	Destination Anywhere	Janie	

Television series
Year	Title	Role	Notes	Refs.
1978	W.E.B.	Unknown		
1979	Kaz	Unknown		
1982–1983	General Hospital	Jackie Templeton	Series regular	
1984	The Master	Holly Trumbull	Episode: "Max"	
1987	The New Homeowner's Guide to Happiness	Sandy Darden	Television special	
1989	Moonlighting	Woman in Elevator	Episode: "When Girls Collide"	
1990	Tales from the Crypt	Cathy Marno	Episode: "Dead Right"	
1997	Ellen	The Sample Lady	Episode: "The Puppy Episode"; uncredited	
2003	Will & Grace	Sissy Palmer-Ginsburg	Episode: "Women and Children First"	
2017–2018	Empire	Claudia	7 episodes	
2018	Animals	General	5 episodes	
2020	Brave New World	Linda	3 episodes	
2024	Feud: Capote vs. The Swans	Ann Woodward	4 episodes	
2024–present	Landman	Cami Miller	Main role	

== Stage ==
Year	Title	Role	Venue	Refs.
1986	The Early Girl	Lily	Circle Repertory Company	
2009	The 24 Hour Plays on Broadway: Pen Play	Performer	Broadway	

== Podcasts ==
Year	Title	Role	Notes	Refs.
2020	Dirty Diana	Diana	6 episodes	

== Music videos ==
Year	Title	Artist	Role	Notes
1980	"It's Not a Rumor"	The Nu Kats	Girl	
1991	"Same Song"	Digital Underground feat. 2pac	Diane Lightson	Archival footage from Nothing but Trouble
1998	"Ugly"	Jon Bon Jovi		
2026	"Animal"	KATSEYE		

== Director ==
Year	Title	Notes	Refs.
2008	Streak	Short film	
2011	Five	TV movie; segment: "Charlotte"	

== Commercials ==
Selected commercials
Year	Company/Brand	Promoting
1988	The Coca-Cola Company	Soft drink beverage: Diet Coke
1991	Keds	Footwear
1992	Oscar Mayer	Food products; Voiceover
1993	Lux	Skin care products
1997	Jog Mate Protein	Food products
1997	Seibu Department Stores	Japanese department store
1997	Suzanne Grae	Australian clothing brand
2009–2012	Helena Rubinstein	Cosmetics brand
2012	Oriflame	Cosmetics line: More by Demi
2013	Oriflame	Fragrance: My Red
2019	Geico	Insurance
2022	AT&T (Super Bowl LVI)	Telecommunications provider
2026	Kérastase	Haircare brand
2026	Lancôme	Perfume and cosmetics brand

== See also ==
- List of awards and nominations received by Demi Moore
