= List of awards and nominations received by Demi Moore =

Demi Moore awards and nominations
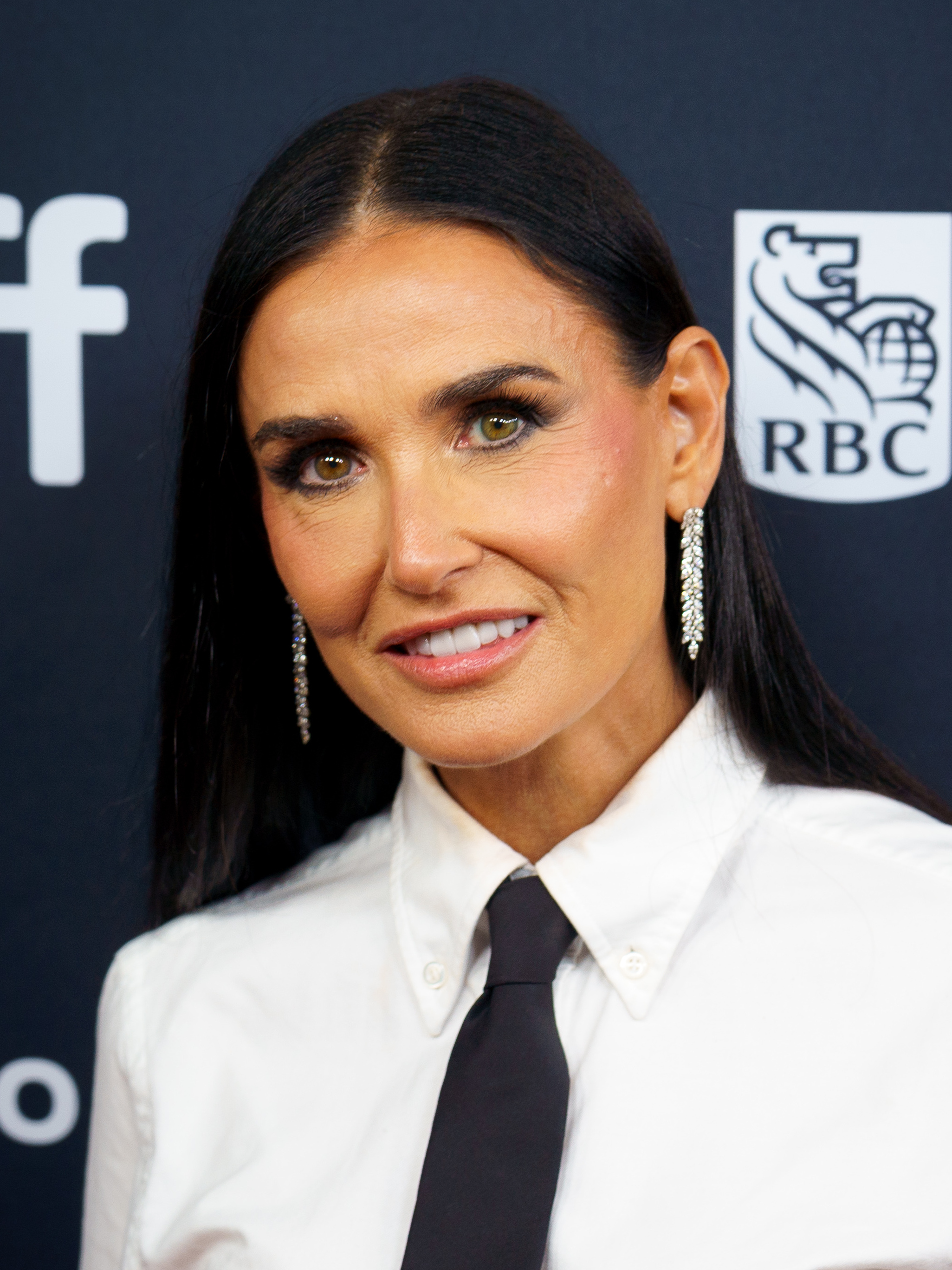
- Moore in 2024
Awards and nominations
Award	Wins	Nominations
Academy Awards	0	1
Actor Awards	1	3
BAFTA Awards	0	1
Critics' Choice Awards	2	3
Emmy Awards	0	1
Golden Globe Awards	1	4

Totals (Note: Certain award groups do not simply award one winner. They acknowledge several different recipients, have runners-up, and have third place. Since this is a specific recognition and is different from losing an award, runner-up mentions are considered wins in this award tally. For simplification and to avoid errors, each award in this list has been presumed to have had a prior nomination.)
- Wins: 37
- Nominations: 79

The following is a list of awards, honors, and nominations received by American actress Demi Moore. Among her various accolades, she has received a Golden Globe Award, a Critics' Choice Award, an Actor Award, and a Film Independent Spirit Award as well as nominations for an Academy Award, a British Academy Film Award, a Directors Guild of America Award, and a Primetime Emmy Award.

Moore made her film debut with the science fiction horror film Parasite (1982), and subsequently appeared on the soap opera General Hospital (1982–1984) and was a short-lived member of the Brat Pack, having roles in Blame It on Rio (1984), St. Elmo's Fire (1985), and About Last Night... (1986). Her role as Molly Jensen in the romantic fantasy thriller film Ghost (1990) garnered her praise; she earned a nomination for the Golden Globe Award for Best Actress in a Motion Picture – Musical or Comedy, and won the Saturn Award for Best Actress. For her performances in the legal drama film A Few Good Men (1992), the drama film Indecent Proposal (1993), the erotic thriller film Disclosure (1994), the romantic drama film The Scarlet Letter (1995), the action films G.I. Jane (1997), and Charlie's Angels: Full Throttle (2003), Moore obtained a total of nine MTV Movie & TV Award nominations, winning in 1994 for Best Kiss.

Moore attained critical attention for her role in the HBO television film If These Walls Could Talk (1996), which she also executive produced. She received a nomination for the Golden Globe Award for Best Actress – Miniseries or Television Film and the Primetime Emmy Award for Outstanding Television Movie. As part of the ensemble in the drama film Bobby (2006) and the financial thriller film Margin Call (2011), she was given various accolades: for Bobby, she earned a nomination for the Critics' Choice Movie Award for Best Acting Ensemble and the Actor Award for Outstanding Performance by a Cast in a Motion Picture, meanwhile for Margin Call, she won the honorary Robert Altman Award at the Film Independent Spirit Awards. She made her directorial debut with the comedy drama anthology television film Five (2011), which earned her a nomination for the Directors Guild of America Award for Outstanding Directorial Achievement in Movies for Television and Limited Series.

For her role in The Substance (2024), Moore won the Golden Globe Award for Best Actress in a Motion Picture – Musical or Comedy, the Critics' Choice Award for Best Actress, and the Actor Award for Outstanding Performance by a Female Actor in a Leading Role and was nominated for the Academy Award for Best Actress, the BAFTA Award for Best Actress in a Leading Role, and the Film Independent Spirit Award for Best Lead Performance.

== Major associations ==
=== Academy Awards ===
Year	Category	Work	Result	Ref.
2025	Best Actress	The Substance	Nominated	

=== Actor Awards ===
Year	Category	Work	Result	Ref.
2007	Outstanding Performance by a Cast in a Motion Picture	Bobby	Nominated	
2025	Outstanding Performance by a Female Actor in a Leading Role	The Substance	Won	
2026	Outstanding Performance by an Ensemble in a Drama Series	Landman	Nominated	

=== BAFTA Awards ===
Year	Category	Work	Result	Ref.
British Academy Film Awards
2025	Best Actress in a Leading Role	The Substance	Nominated	

=== Critics' Choice Awards ===
Year	Category	Work	Result	Ref.
Critics' Choice Awards
2007	Best Acting Ensemble	Bobby	Nominated	
2025	Best Actress	The Substance	Won	
Critics' Choice Super Awards
2025	Best Actress in a Horror Movie	The Substance	Won	

=== Emmy Awards ===
Year	Category	Work	Result	Ref.
Primetime Emmy Awards
1997	Outstanding Made for Television Movie	If These Walls Could Talk	Nominated	

=== Golden Globe Awards ===
Year	Category	Work	Result	Ref.
1991	Best Actress – Motion Picture Comedy or Musical	Ghost	Nominated	
1997	Best Actress – Miniseries or Television Film	If These Walls Could Talk	Nominated	
1997	Best Miniseries or Motion Picture Made for Television	If These Walls Could Talk	Nominated	
2025	Best Actress – Motion Picture Comedy or Musical	The Substance	Won	

== Critics' awards ==
Award	Year	Work	Category	Result	Ref.
Alliance of Women Film Journalists	2024	The Substance	Best Actress	Nominated	
Chicago Film Critics Association	2024	The Substance	Best Actress	Nominated	
Dallas–Fort Worth Film Critics Association	2024	The Substance	Best Actress	Runner-up	
Detroit Film Critics Society	2012	Margin Call	Best Ensemble	Nominated	
Dorian Awards	2025	The Substance	Film Performance of the Year	Won	
Dublin Film Critics' Circle	2024	The Substance	Best Actress	2nd place	
International Cinephile Society	2025	The Substance	Best Actress	Nominated	
Kansas City Film Critics Circle	2024	The Substance	Best Actress	Won	
Las Vegas Film Critics Society	2024	The Substance	Best Actress	Nominated	
London Film Critics' Circle	2024	The Substance	Actress of the Year	Nominated	
Los Angeles Film Critics Association	2024	The Substance	Best Lead Performance	Runner-up	
New York Film Critics Online	2024	The Substance	Best Actress	Runner-up	
San Diego Film Critics Society	2024	The Substance	Best Actress	Nominated	
Seattle Film Critics Society	2024	The Substance	Best Lead Actress	Nominated	
Southeastern Film Critics Association	2024	The Substance	Best Actress	Runner-up	
St. Louis Film Critics Association	2024	The Substance	Best Actress	Nominated	
Toronto Film Critics Association	2024	The Substance	Outstanding Lead Performance	Runner-up	
Vancouver Film Critics Circle	2024	The Substance	Best Female Actor	Nominated	
Washington D.C. Area Film Critics Association	2024	The Substance	Best Actress	Nominated	
Women Film Critics Circle	2025	The Substance	Best Actress	Won	

== Other awards and nominations ==
Award	Year	Work	Category	Result	Ref.
AARP Movies for Grownups Awards	2025	The Substance	Best Actress	Won	
Astra Film Awards	2025	The Substance	Best Actress	Nominated	
Astra Film Awards	2025	The Substance	Best Performance in a Horror or Thriller	Nominated	
Cinémathèque française	2024	—N/a	Career Tribute	Honored	
Directors Guild of America Awards	2012	Five	Outstanding Directorial Achievement in Movies for Television and Mini-Series	Nominated	
Drama Desk Awards	1987	The Early Girl	Theatre World Award	Won	
Fangoria Chainsaw Awards	2025	The Substance	Best Lead Performance	Won	
Glamour Awards	2025	—N/a	Woman of the Year	Won	
Gotham Awards	2011	Margin Call	Best Ensemble Performance	Nominated	
Gotham Awards	2024	The Substance	Outstanding Lead Performance	Nominated	
Golden Raspberry Awards	1992	Nothing but Trouble & The Butcher's Wife	Worst Actress	Nominated	
Golden Raspberry Awards	1994	Indecent Proposal	Worst Actress	Nominated	
Golden Raspberry Awards	1996	The Scarlet Letter	Worst Actress	Nominated	
Golden Raspberry Awards	1996	The Scarlet Letter	Worst Screen Combo (shared with either Robert Duvall or Gary Oldman)	Nominated	
Golden Raspberry Awards	1997	The Juror & Striptease	Worst Actress	Won	
Golden Raspberry Awards	1997	Striptease	Worst Screen Combo (shared with Burt Reynolds)	Won	
Golden Raspberry Awards	1998	G.I. Jane	Worst Actress	Won	
Golden Raspberry Awards	2001	Passion of Mind	Worst Actress	Nominated	
Golden Raspberry Awards	2004	Charlie's Angels: Full Throttle	Worst Supporting Actress	Won	
Golden Raspberry Awards	2025	The Substance	Razzie Redeemer Award	Nominated	
Hamptons International Film Festival	2024	—N/a	Career Achievement in Acting Award	Honored	
Hollywood Film Awards	2006	Bobby	Ensemble of the Year	Won	
Independent Spirit Awards	2012	Margin Call	Robert Altman Award	Won	
Independent Spirit Awards	2025	The Substance	Best Lead Performance	Nominated	
Irish Film & Television Academy Awards	2025	The Substance	Best International Actress	Won	
Las Culturistas Culture Awards	2025	—N/a	Best Crier	Won	
MTV Movie & TV Awards	1993	A Few Good Men	Best Female Performance	Nominated	
MTV Movie & TV Awards	1994	Indecent Proposal	Best Female Performance	Nominated	
MTV Movie & TV Awards	1994	Indecent Proposal	Best Kiss	Won	
MTV Movie & TV Awards	1994	Indecent Proposal	Most Desirable Female	Nominated	
MTV Movie & TV Awards	1995	Disclosure	Most Desirable Female	Nominated	
MTV Movie & TV Awards	1995	Disclosure	Best Villain	Nominated	
MTV Movie & TV Awards	1996	The Scarlet Letter	Most Desirable Female	Nominated	
MTV Movie & TV Awards	1998	G.I. Jane	Best Fight	Nominated	
MTV Movie & TV Awards	2004	Charlie's Angels: Full Throttle	Best Villain	Nominated	
People's Choice Awards	1993	A Few Good Men	Favorite Motion Picture Actress	Nominated	
People's Choice Awards	1993	A Few Good Men	Favorite Actress in a Dramatic Motion Picture	Won	
People's Choice Awards	1996	The Scarlet Letter	Favorite Actress in a Dramatic Motion Picture	Nominated	
Sant Jordi Awards	2025	The Substance	Best Foreign Actress	Won	
Satellite Awards	2025	The Substance	Best Actress in a Motion Picture – Comedy or Musical	Won	
Saturn Awards	1991	Ghost	Best Actress	Won	
Saturn Awards	2025	The Substance	Best Actress	Won	
Savannah Film Festival	2024	—N/a	Icon Award	Won	
SFFILM	2024	—N/a	Maria Manetti Shrem Award for Acting	Honored	
ShoWest Convention	1995	—N/a	Female Star of the Year	Won	
Theatre World Awards	1987	The Early Girl	Theatre World Award	Won	

== See also ==
- Demi Moore filmography
