= List of The New York Times number-one books of 2019 =

The American daily newspaper The New York Times publishes multiple weekly lists ranking the best-selling books in the United States. The lists are split into three genres—fiction, nonfiction and children's books. Both the fiction and nonfiction lists are further split into multiple lists.

== Fiction ==
The following list ranks the number-one best-selling fiction books, in the combined print and e-books category.

The most frequent weekly best seller of the year was Where the Crawdads Sing by Delia Owens with 25 weeks at the top of the list.

Date	Book	Author	Ref.
January 6	The Reckoning	John Grisham	
January 13	Long Road to Mercy	David Baldacci	
January 20	Verses for the Dead	Douglas Preston and Lincoln Child	
January 27	Turning Point	Danielle Steel	
February 3	Where the Crawdads Sing	Delia Owens	
February 10	Where the Crawdads Sing	Delia Owens	
February 17	Where the Crawdads Sing	Delia Owens	
February 24	Connections in Death	J. D. Robb	
March 3	Where the Crawdads Sing	Delia Owens	
March 10	Where the Crawdads Sing	Delia Owens	
March 17	Where the Crawdads Sing	Delia Owens	
March 24	Where the Crawdads Sing	Delia Owens	
March 31	Where the Crawdads Sing	Delia Owens	
April 7	Where the Crawdads Sing	Delia Owens	
April 14	Where the Crawdads Sing	Delia Owens	
April 21	Where the Crawdads Sing	Delia Owens	
April 28	Where the Crawdads Sing	Delia Owens	
May 5	Redemption	David Baldacci	
May 12	Neon Prey	John Sandford	
May 19	18th Abduction	James Patterson and Maxine Paetro	
May 26	Where the Crawdads Sing	Delia Owens	
June 2	Where the Crawdads Sing	Delia Owens	
June 9	Where the Crawdads Sing	Delia Owens	
June 16	Where the Crawdads Sing	Delia Owens	
June 23	Where the Crawdads Sing	Delia Owens	
June 30	Where the Crawdads Sing	Delia Owens	
July 7	Summer of '69	Elin Hilderbrand	
July 14	Where the Crawdads Sing	Delia Owens	
July 21	Where the Crawdads Sing	Delia Owens	
July 28	Under Currents	Nora Roberts	
August 4	The New Girl	Daniel Silva	
August 11	One Good Deed	David Baldacci	
August 18	Where the Crawdads Sing	Delia Owens	
August 25	Where the Crawdads Sing	Delia Owens	
September 1	Where the Crawdads Sing	Delia Owens	
September 8	Where the Crawdads Sing	Delia Owens	
September 15	A Better Man	Louise Penny	
September 22	Vendetta in Death	J. D. Robb	
September 29	The Institute	Stephen King	
October 6	The Institute	Stephen King	
October 13	The Water Dancer	Ta-Nehisi Coates	
October 20	Bloody Genius	John Sandford	
October 27	The 19th Christmas	James Patterson and Maxine Paetro	
November 3	The Guardians	John Grisham	
November 10	The Night Fire	Michael Connelly	
November 17	Blue Moon	Lee Child	
November 24	Blue Moon	Lee Child	
December 1	Twisted Twenty-Six	Janet Evanovich	
December 8	A Minute to Midnight	David Baldacci	
December 15	The Rise of Magicks	Nora Roberts	
December 22	The Guardians	John Grisham	
December 29	Where the Crawdads Sing	Delia Owens	

== Nonfiction ==
The following list ranks the number-one best-selling nonfiction books, in the combined print and e-books category.

The most frequent weekly best seller of the year was Becoming by Michelle Obama with 15 weeks at the top of the list; it was also a best seller for the last five weeks in 2018.

Date	Book	Author	Publisher	Ref.
January 6	Becoming	Michelle Obama	Crown	
January 13	Becoming	Michelle Obama	Crown	
January 20	Becoming	Michelle Obama	Crown	
January 27	Becoming	Michelle Obama	Crown	
February 3	Becoming	Michelle Obama	Crown	
February 10	Becoming	Michelle Obama	Crown	
February 17	Becoming	Michelle Obama	Crown	
February 24	Becoming	Michelle Obama	Crown	
March 3	Becoming	Michelle Obama	Crown	
March 10	The Threat	Andrew McCabe	St. Martin's	
March 17	Becoming	Michelle Obama	Crown	
March 24	Becoming	Michelle Obama	Crown	
March 31	Becoming	Michelle Obama	Crown	
April 7	The Right Side of History	Ben Shapiro	Broadside	
April 14	Becoming	Michelle Obama	Crown	
April 21	Becoming	Michelle Obama	Crown	
April 28	Life Will Be the Death of Me	Chelsea Handler	Spiegel & Grau	
May 5	Becoming	Michelle Obama	Crown	
May 12	The Mueller Report	The Washington Post	Scribner	
May 19	The Mueller Report	The Washington Post	Scribner	
May 26	The Pioneers	David McCullough	Simon & Schuster	
June 2	Howard Stern Comes Again	Howard Stern	Simon & Schuster	
June 9	Unfreedom of the Press	Mark Levin	Threshold Editions	
June 16	Unfreedom of the Press	Mark Levin	Threshold Editions	
June 23	Unfreedom of the Press	Mark Levin	Threshold Editions	
June 30	Unfreedom of the Press	Mark Levin	Threshold Editions	
July 7	Educated	Tara Westover	Random House	
July 14	Educated	Tara Westover	Random House	
July 21	Educated	Tara Westover	Random House	
July 28	Three Women	Lisa Taddeo	Avid Reader Press	
August 4	Educated	Tara Westover	Random House	
August 11	Educated	Tara Westover	Random House	
August 18	Educated	Tara Westover	Random House	
August 25	Educated	Tara Westover	Random House	
September 1	Educated	Tara Westover	Random House	
September 8	Educated	Tara Westover	Random House	
September 15	Educated	Tara Westover	Random House	
September 22	Call Sign Chaos	Jim Mattis and Bing West	Random House	
September 29	Talking to Strangers	Malcolm Gladwell	Little, Brown	
October 6	Talking to Strangers	Malcolm Gladwell	Little, Brown	
October 13	Inside Out	Demi Moore	Harper	
October 20	Blowout	Rachel Maddow	Crown	
October 27	Blowout	Rachel Maddow	Crown	
November 3	Me	Elton John	Holt	
November 10	Me	Elton John	Holt	
November 17	The Beautiful Ones	Prince	Spiegel & Grau	
November 24	Triggered	Donald Trump Jr.	Center Street	
December 1	Triggered	Donald Trump Jr.	Center Street	
December 8	A Warning	Anonymous	Twelve	
December 15	Crime in Progress	Glenn Simpson and Peter Fritsch	Random House	
December 22	Educated	Tara Westover	Random House	
December 29	Educated	Tara Westover	Random House	

== See also ==
- Publishers Weekly list of bestselling novels in the United States in the 2010s
