= Joss Ackland =

British actor (1928–2023)

Joss Ackland CBE
- Ackland in The Object of Beauty (1991)
- Born: Sidney Edmond Jocelyn Ackland; 29 February 1928; North Kensington, London, England
- Died: 19 November 2023 (aged 95); Clovelly, Devon, England
- Education: Central School of Speech and Drama
- Occupation: Actor
- Years active: 1945–2014
- Spouse: Rosemary Kirkcaldy (m. 1951; died 2002)
- Children: 7

Sidney Edmond Jocelyn Ackland (29 February 1928 – 19 November 2023) was an English actor who appeared in more than 130 film, radio and television roles. He was nominated for the BAFTA Award for Best Actor in a Supporting Role for portraying Jock Delves Broughton in White Mischief (1987).

== Early life ==
Sidney Edmond Jocelyn Ackland was born in a basement flat in "then insalubrious" North Kensington, London, on 29 February 1928, the son of Sydney Norman Ackland (died 1981), an Irish journalist who had been sent to England to live with an aunt by his parents for seducing their maid, but subsequently seduced his aunt's maid, Ruth Izod (died 1957), whom he married. The Acklands' basement flat was one of "a string of similar places" in which they lived, invariably with "one bedroom and the absolute bare essentials"; Ackland described his upbringing in the Ladbroke Grove area as being "very poor".

Initially educated at Dame Alice Owen's School, Ackland left aged fifteen to become an actor. Thus, Ackland was trained by Elsie Fogerty at the Central School of Speech and Drama, then based at the Royal Albert Hall, London.

Ackland and Rosemary Kirkcaldy were married on 18 August 1951, when Ackland was 23 and she was 22. She was an actress and Ackland wooed her when they appeared on stage together in Pitlochry, Scotland. The couple struggled initially as Ackland's acting career was in its infancy. In 1954 they moved to Lilongwe in what was then Nyasaland, now Malawi, where Ackland managed a tea plantation for six months but, deciding it was too dangerous, they moved to Cape Town, South Africa. Though they both obtained steady acting jobs in South Africa, after two years they returned to England in 1957.

== Career ==
After attending London's Central School of Speech and Drama, he made his professional debut on stage at just 17 years old, starring in the 1945 production of The Hasty Heart. Ackland joined the Old Vic, appearing alongside other notable actors including Maggie Smith, Judi Dench and Tom Courtenay. Ackland worked steadily in television and film in the 1960s and 70s.

He worked opposite Alec Guinness in the 1979 television serial Tinker Tailor Soldier Spy, playing sporting journalist and intermittent British espionage operative Jerry Westerby, and his career advanced through the 1980s with important parts in such films as The Sicilian, Lethal Weapon 2, The Hunt for Red October and White Mischief. On television Ackland appeared as Jephro Rucastle with Jeremy Brett and David Burke in The Adventures of Sherlock Holmes; the episode entitled "The Copper Beeches". Other appearances included Passion of Mind with Demi Moore and the two-part TV serial Hogfather based on Terry Pratchett's Discworld. He played C. S. Lewis in the television version of Shadowlands before it was adapted into a stage play starring Nigel Hawthorne and then a theatrical film with Anthony Hopkins in the same role. His voice (as well as that of Roy Dotrice) was heard reading quotations in several episodes of Jacob Bronowski's 1973 documentary series The Ascent of Man.

His voice was also a mainstay of many British television commercials including Yellow Pages, WK Kellogg Co and Homepride.

Ackland's stage roles included creating the role of Juan Perón in Tim Rice and Andrew Lloyd Webber's musical Evita opposite Elaine Paige. He also starred in the London production of Stephen Sondheim's and Hugh Wheeler's A Little Night Music with Jean Simmons and Hermione Gingold, performing on the RCA Victor original London cast album.

Ackland appeared in the Pet Shop Boys' 1988 film It Couldn't Happen Here, and in the video for their version of the song Always on My Mind, which was taken from the film. Several years later, he said in an interview with the Radio Times that he had appeared with the band purely because his grandchildren liked their music.

Ackland also co-starred as Emilio Estevez's mentor and friend Hans in the 1992 Disney The Mighty Ducks. He reprised the role four years later in 1996's D3: The Mighty Ducks.

In a 2001 interview with the BBC, Ackland said that he had appeared in some "awful" films due to being a workaholic. He said that he "regretted" appearing in Bill & Ted's Bogus Journey and the Pet Shop Boys music video. He also criticised former co-star Demi Moore as "not very bright or talented", though he worked with her again years later in Flawless (2008).

Also in 2007, Ackland appeared in the film How About You opposite Vanessa Redgrave, portraying a recovering alcoholic living in a residential home after being forced to retire and losing his wife to cancer.

In 2008, Ackland returned to the small screen as Sir Freddy Butler, a much married baronet, in the ITV1 show Midsomer Murders. The episode was entitled Vixens Run.

In September 2013, Jonathan Miller directed a Gala Performance of William Shakespeare's King Lear at the Old Vic in London, with Ackland in the role of Lear.

== Personal life and death ==
Ackland and his wife Rosemary (née Kirkcaldy) were married for 51 years. They had seven children, thirty-two grandchildren and eight great-grandchildren. Despite his filming taking him to far-flung locations, he said Rosemary and he "were hardly ever apart". Daughter Kirsty married Anthony Shawn Baring, a descendant of the merchant banker Sir Francis Baring, 1st Baronet and a descendant of Robert Rundell Guinness, founder of the merchant bank Guinness Mahon.

In 1963, their house in Barnes caught fire. Rosemary, who was pregnant at the time, saved their five children but broke her back when jumping from the bedroom window. She was told she would miscarry and never walk again, but she later gave birth and after 18 months in Stoke Mandeville Hospital, was able to walk again. Their eldest son, Paul, died of a heroin overdose in 1982, aged 29. In 2000, Rosemary was diagnosed with motor neurone disease; she died on 25 July 2002.

In 2020, Ackland participated in the "Letters Live" project, and was recorded from his home in Clovelly, Devon. His letter reflected on the COVID-19 crisis and his hopes for how the country could draw "strength from adversity".

Ackland died at home in Clovelly, on 19 November 2023, aged 95.

== Filmography ==
=== Film ===
Year	Title	Role	Notes
1949	Landfall	O'Neill (uncredited)	
1950	Seven Days to Noon		
1952	Ghost Ship	Ron, a seaman	
1959	A Midsummer Night's Dream		
1962	In Search of the Castaways	Seaman on yacht	Uncredited
1966	Rasputin: the Mad Monk	The Bishop	
1969	Crescendo	Carter	
1970	The House That Dripped Blood	Neville Rogers	
1971	Villain	Edgar Lewis	
1971	Mr. Forbush and the Penguins	The Leader	
1972	The Happiness Cage	Dr Frederick	
1973	Hitler: The Last Ten Days	Gen. Burgdorf	
1973	Penny Gold	Jones	
1973	England Made Me	Haller	
1973	The Three Musketeers	D'Artagnan's Father	
1974	The Black Windmill	Chief Supt. Wray	
1974	S*P*Y*S	Martinson	
1974	The Little Prince	The King	
1974	Great Expectations	Joe Gargery	
1975	One of Our Dinosaurs Is Missing	B.J. Spence	
1975	Royal Flash	Sapten	
1975	Operation Daybreak	Janák	
1977	The Strange Case of the End of Civilisation as We Know It	President	
1978	Watership Down	Black Rabbit (voice)	
1978	Silver Bears	Henry Foreman	
1978	The Greek Tycoon		
1978	Who Is Killing the Great Chefs of Europe?	Cantrell	
1979	A Nightingale Sang in Berkeley Square	Prison Warden	Uncredited
1979	Saint Jack	Yardley	
1980	Rough Cut	Insp. Vanderveld	
1980	The Apple	Hippie Leader/Mr Topps	
1985	A Zed & Two Noughts	Van Hoyten	
1986	Lady Jane	Sir John Bridges	
1987	White Mischief	Sir Jock Delves Broughton	
1987	The Sicilian	Don Masino Croce	
1987	It Couldn't Happen Here	Priest/Murderer	
1988	To Kill a Priest	Colonel	
1989	Lethal Weapon 2	Arjen 'Aryan' Rudd	
1990	The Palermo Connection	Mafia boss	
1990	The Hunt for Red October	Ambassador Andrei Lysenko	
1990	Tre colonne in cronaca	Gaetano Leporino	
1991	The Object of Beauty	Mr Mercer	
1991	Bill & Ted's Bogus Journey	Chuck De Nomolos	
1992	The Sheltering Desert	Col. Johnston	
1992	Once Upon a Crime	Hercules Popodopoulos	
1992	Shadowchaser	Kinderman	
1992	The Bridge	Smithson	
1992	The Mighty Ducks	Hans	
1993	Nowhere to Run	Franklin Hale	
1993	The Princess and the Goblin	King Papa (voice)	
1994	OcchioPinocchio	Brando	
1994	Miracle on 34th Street	Victor Landberg	Uncredited
1994	Giorgino	Father Glaise	
1995	Mad Dogs and Englishmen	Insp. Sam Stringer	
1995	The Thief and the Cobbler	Brigand (voice)	
1995	A Kid in King Arthur's Court	King Arthur	
1996	Surviving Picasso	Henri Matisse	
1996	D3: The Mighty Ducks	Hans	
1997	Swept from the Sea	Mr Swaffer	
1997	Firelight	Lord Clare	
1998	My Giant	Monsignor Popescu	Uncredited
2000	The Mumbo Jumbo	Mayor Smith	
2000	Passion of Mind	Dr Langer, the French Psychiatrist	
2002	No Good Deed	Mr Thomas Quarre	
2002	K-19: The Widowmaker	Marshal Zelentsov	
2003	I'll Be There	Evil Edmonds	
2004	A Different Loyalty	Randolph Cauffield	
2005	The Christmas Eve Snowfall	(Narrator)	
2005	Asylum	Jack Straffen	
2006	These Foolish Things	Albert	
2006	Moscow Zero	Tolstoy	
2007	How About You	Donald	
2008	Flawless	MKA	
2013	Prisoners of the Sun	Prof. Mendella	
2014	Decline of an Empire	Rufus	

=== Television ===
Year	Title	Role	Notes
1957	Destination Downing Street	Immelmann	TV series
1963	The Indian Tales of Rudyard Kipling	William Stevens	TV series
1964, 1967–1968	Z-Cars	Mr Shields/Det. Insp. Todd	42 episodes
1966	David Copperfield	Mr. Peggotty	6 episodes
1966	Lord Raingo	Tom Hogarth	3 episodes
1966	Theatre 625	John Hinks	Episode: "On the March to the Sea"
1966–1968	The Troubleshooters	Mr Gibbon (1966), Sam Jardine (1966-1967), Considine (1968), Lewis (1968)	5 episodes
1966	Mystery and Imagination	Herr Scavenius, Mr. Smedhurst	2 episodes
1967	The Further Adventures of the Three Musketeers	d'Artagnan	Miniseries
1969	The Avengers	Brig. Hansing	Episode: "The Morning After"
1969	The Gold Robbers	Derek Hartford	Episode: "Grounded"
1969	W. Somerset Maugham	Harold Bannon	Episode: "Before the Party"
1969	Canterbury Tales	The Host in the Wife of Bath's tale	Miniseries
1966, 1970	Play of the Month	Charley/Chebutykin	2 episodes
1971, 1972	Thirty-Minute Theatre	The Applicant/The Man	2 episodes
1971	Shirley's World	Inspector Vaughan	Episode: "The Reunion"
1972	The Persuaders!	Felix Meadowes	Episode: "Read and Destroy"
1972	Six Faces	Harry Mellor	2 episodes
1973	The Rivals of Sherlock Holmes	Grubber	Episode: "The Mystery of the Amber Beads"
1974	The Protectors	Arthur Gordon	Episode: "Trial"
1976	Centre Play	Doctor	Episode: "You Talk Too Much"
1976	The Crezz	Charles Bronte	12 episodes
1978	Enemy at the Door	Major General Laidlaw	Episode: "Treason"
1978	Return of the Saint	Gunther	Episode: "The Nightmare Man"
1978	The Sweeney	Alan Ember	Episode: "Feet of Clay"
1979	Tinker Tailor Soldier Spy	Jerry Westerby	Episode: "Smiley Sets a Trap"
1980, 1988	Tales of the Unexpected	Jack Cutler, Colonel George Peregrine	2 episodes
1980	A Question of Guilt	Samuel Kent	
1980	The Love Tapes	Narrator (uncredited)	TV movie
1980	The Gentle Touch	Ivor Stocker	Episode: "Menaces"
1981	Dangerous Davies – The Last Detective	Chief Insp. Yardbird	TV movie
1981	Thicker Than Water	Joseph Lockwood	TV series
1982	The Confessions of Felix Krull	Mr. Twentyman	TV series
1982	The Barretts of Wimpole Street	Edward Moulton-Barrett	TV movie
1984	Shroud for a Nightingale	Stephen Courtney-Briggs, surgeon	Mini-series
1984	BBC Television Shakespeare	Menenius	Episode: The Tragedy of Coriolanus
1985	Shadowlands	C. S. Lewis	TV movie
1985	The Adventures of Sherlock Holmes	Jephro Rucastle	Episode: "The Copper Beeches"
1987	A Killing on the Exchange	Sir Max Sillman	TV movie
1987	Queenie	Sir Burton Rumsey	Mini-series
1987	When We Are Married	Henry Ormonroyd	TV movie
1988	The Man Who Lived at the Ritz	Hermann Göring	Mini-series
1988	Codename: Kyril	'C'	Mini-series
1989	A Quiet Conspiracy	Theo Carter	Mini-series
1989	The Justice Game	Sir James Crichton	2 episodes
1989	First and Last	Alan Holly	TV movie
1990	Jekyll & Hyde	Charles Lanyon	TV movie
1990	Spymaker: The Secret Life of Ian Fleming	Gen. Gerhard Hellstein	TV movie
1991	A Murder of Quality	Terence Fielding	TV movie
1991	A Woman Named Jackie	Aristotle Onassis	Mini-series
1991	Ashenden	Cumming	Mini-series
1991	They Do It with Mirrors	Lewis Serrocold	TV movie
1992	Incident at Victoria Falls	King Edward	TV movie
1992	The Young Indiana Jones Chronicles	The Prussian	Episode: "Austria, March 1917"
1993, 1996	Screen Two	Sir Charles (Archie) Peverall/Captain	2 episodes, including "Deadly Voyage"
1994	Citizen Locke	Lord Ashley	TV movie
1994	Shakespeare: The Animated Tales	Julius Caesar (voice)	Episode: "Julius Caesar"
1994	Jacob	Isaac	TV movie
1995	Citizen X	Bondarchuk	TV movie
1995	Daisies in December	Gerald Carmody	TV movie
1996	Hidden in Silence	German factory manager	
1996	To the Ends of Time	King Francis	TV movie
1996	Testament: The Bible in Animation	Noah (voice)/Samuel (voice)	2 episodes
1998	Heat of the Sun	Max van der Vuurst	1 episode
2001	Othello	James Brabant	TV movie
2003	Henry VIII	Henry VII	TV movie
2005	Icon	General Nikolai Nikolayev	TV movie
2006	Midsomer Murders	Sir Freddy Butler	Episode: "Vixen's Run"
2006	Hogfather	Mustrum Ridcully	Mini-series
2006	Above and Beyond	Winston Churchill	Mini-series
2007	Kingdom	Mr Narbutowicz	1 episode

=== Video games ===
- Tomb Raider: The Angel of Darkness (2003) (voice) as Pieter Van Eckhardt

=== Audiobooks ===
- Rise of the Ogre (Audiobook) (2006) (Narrator)
- The Crowd, by Ray Bradbury
- A little place off the edgeware road by Graham Greene
- Midnight Express by Alfred Noyes
- Laura by Robert Aickman
- The Screwtape Letters in The C.S. Lewis Essential Audio Library

== Honours ==
He was made a Commander of the Order of the British Empire (CBE) in the Civil Division for Services to Drama in the 2001 New Year Honours List.

== Awards and nominations ==
Year	Awards	Category	Nominated work	Result	Ref.
1982	Laurence Olivier Awards	Actor of the Year in a Revival	Henry IV, Part 1 and 2	Nominated	
1989	British Academy Film Awards	Best Actor in a Supporting Role	White Mischief	Nominated	
1990	British Academy Television Awards	Best Actor	First and Last	Nominated	

== Bibliography ==
- Ackland, Joss (17 June 2010). My Better Half and Me. Ebury Press. ISBN 978-0-09-193347-0
- -- (1989). I Must Be In There Somewhere (autobiography). Hodder and Stoughton. ISBN 978-0-340-49396-0
