= Disclosure (novel) =

1994 book by Michael Crichton

- First edition cover
- Author: Michael Crichton
- Cover artist: Chip Kidd
- Language: English
- Genre: Crime novel
- Publisher: Knopf
- Publication date: January 1994
- Publication place: United States
- Media type: Print (Hardcover)
- Pages: 597 pp.
- ISBN: 0-679-41945-4
- OCLC: 28844025
- Dewey Decimal: 813/.54 20
- LC Class: PS3553.R48 D57 1994
- Preceded by: Rising Sun
- Followed by: The Lost World

Disclosure is a novel by Michael Crichton, his ninth under his own name and nineteenth overall, and published in 1994. The novel is set at a fictional computer hardware manufacturing company. The plot concerns protagonist Tom Sanders and his struggle to prove that he was sexually harassed by his female employer. In 1994, a film adaptation was released and was a box office success.

== Summary ==
Tom Sanders, the head of advanced products manufacturing at DigiCom, expects to be promoted to run the advanced products division after DigiCom's merger with a publishing house. Instead, the promotion is given to his ex-girlfriend, Meredith Johnson, who recently moved to Seattle from the company's headquarters in Cupertino, California.

Later that day, Meredith calls Tom into her office, ostensibly to discuss an advanced CD-ROM drive. She aggressively tries to resume their relationship, despite Tom's repeated attempts to resist. When he spurns her sexual advances, Meredith angrily vows to make him pay.

The next morning, Tom discovers that Meredith has retaliated by falsely accusing him of sexual harassment. DigiCom president Bob Garvin, fearing that the incident could jeopardize the merger, tells the company's general counsel, Phil Blackburn, to propose transferring Tom to the company's Austin facility. However, Tom's division is due to be spun off as a publicly traded company after the merger, and if he is transferred, he will lose stock options which would have made him a wealthy man. In addition, Tom's coworkers treat him with animosity, as they have believed Meredith's story.

Seemingly out of options, Tom gets in touch with Seattle attorney Louise Fernandez, who agrees to take the case. Tom threatens to sue Meredith and DigiCom for sexual harassment unless Meredith is fired, throwing the merger and his future with the company in jeopardy. During a mediation, Tom discovers that when he called one of his colleagues, John Levin, about the problems with the drive, John's answering machine recorded the whole incident with Meredith. He and Louise also discover that DigiCom officials have known for some time that Meredith has a history of unwelcome advances toward male coworkers, yet did nothing to stop it. Confronted with this evidence, DigiCom is forced to agree to a settlement in which Meredith is quietly pushed out and Tom is restored to his former post.

That night, Tom gets an email from "A Friend" warning him that all is not normal yet. Later, he overhears Meredith and Phil planning to make it look like Tom is responsible for defects in the CD-ROM project, thereby giving DigiCom an excuse to fire him for incompetence. Tom is initially unable to access the company database to prove his innocence, since Meredith has revoked his authorization. He circumvents the block through a prototype of the company's virtual reality machine that visualizes data. Tom discovers that Meredith changed the quality control specifications at the Malaysian plant manufacturing the drive. These changes, ostensibly to appease Malaysian government demands and cut costs, resulted in the defects. With the help of one of his Malaysian colleagues, Tom obtains enough evidence to turn the tables on Meredith and Phil, resulting in them getting fired instead. The merger is thought to have fallen through, but does take place, with another woman, Stephanie Kaplan, getting the vice-president job. She tells Tom that she will soon move on, and the job will be his. The novel's epilogue states that both Phil and Meredith found better jobs elsewhere.

== Major themes ==
The primary theme is sexual harassment. According to Crichton, it is based on a true story of a male employee who is being sexually harassed by a female executive, reversing the expected gender roles. In a 1994 interview, Crichton said that a 1988 case was the basis of the story.

Crichton's book raised the theme of the abuse of power, particularly, abuse of power and gender. In interview, Crichton said, "I would not expect, as women move into positions of power, that they would behave in substantially different ways from men. Which is to suggest, as far as I can tell, that a certain number of people in supervisory positions will abuse, in various ways, their subordinates."

Moreover, Disclosure concerns pressures that hierarchical structures can place on human behavior in complex organizations. "And I think the reality of hierarchical structures," according to Crichton, "is that the hierarchy strongly determines the behavior of an individual within the hierarchy. We none of us in a hierarchy have a tremendous amount of flexibility and I think that the notion that major changes, I think there certainly may be some changes in tone and attitude, but the notion that major changes will occur because someone of a different sex sits behind [sic] the seat, I think is going to prove to be a fantasy."

The book has been referred to as both postfeminist and anti-feminist. Crichton offered a rebuttal at the close of the novel which states that a "role-reversal" story uncovers aspects of the subject that would not be as easily seen with a female protagonist.

== Film adaptation ==
In 1994, Disclosure, a film adaptation, was released. It starred Demi Moore, Michael Douglas, Donald Sutherland and Dennis Miller. Reviews to the movie were mixed but was a box office hit, as it made over $214 million worldwide.

An unofficial Indian remake of the film titled Aitraaz was released in 2004. It starred Akshay Kumar and Priyanka Chopra in Douglas and Moore's roles with Kareena Kapoor as Kumar's wife. The Hindi film was later remade in Kannada as Shrimathi (2011).

== Reception ==
Reviews were mostly favourable.

The New York Times's Christopher Lehmann-Haupt said of Disclosure that it is:

an elaborate provocation of rage in which a thousand fragments of revenge finally fall into place, like acid rain on wildfire. Meanwhile, Mr. Crichton also irrelevantly entertains us with a complex vision of the digital future, complete with cellular phones the size of credit cards, CD-ROM players that can store 600 books and database environments you can virtually walk around in with the guidance of a helpful angel who cracks wise.

In a 2013 review comparing the novel with the film adaptation, Nathan Rabin expressed a negative view: he described Disclosure as "loathsome" and "borderline-unreadable", and inferior to its film version. Rabin also criticized the novel's characterization: "Not since Atlas Shrugged has a novelist strayed so egregiously from plausible human behavior in dogged pursuit of making a muddled ideological point."
