= Inside Out (Moore memoir) =

2019 memoir by Demi Moore

- First edition cover
- Author: Demi Moore
- Audio read by: Demi Moore
- Cover artist: Matthew Rolston (photo); Robin Bilardello (design)
- Language: English
- Subject: Memoir
- Publisher: Harper
- Publication date: September 24, 2019
- Publication place: United States
- Media type: Print (Hardcover)
- Pages: 272
- ISBN: 978-0-06-204953-7

Inside Out is a 2019 memoir by American actress Demi Moore. It was published on September 24, 2019, by Harper, an imprint of HarperCollins. In the memoir, Moore discusses her childhood, relationships and personal struggles.

== Background ==
In June 2010, it was announced that Moore had signed a $2 million deal with HarperCollins. Moore had originally planned her memoirs to coincide with her 50th birthday in 2012. She centered the memoir around "a fundamental question, which is, 'How did I get here?' Coming from where I've come from, how did I get here?" she told People magazine. She said that writing the memoir was a necessary part of a longer process of rediscovering herself. "I had to figure out why to do this, because my own success didn't drive me," Moore said. The book was co-written by journalist Ariel Levy.

== Synopsis ==
The memoir begins with stories from Moore's tough upbringing, including her mother's first attempted suicide and the time Moore was raped at the age of 15. Moore's parents' battled with alcoholism. Moore recalled using her fingers to dig pills out of her mother's mouth, which was just the first of several suicide attempts her mother made before she died in 1998. Moore called this event as a life-changing moment that ended her childhood. She learned that the man she grew up calling dad, Danny Guynes (who later died by suicide), was not her biological father.

Moore began her modeling career, when she worked with a photographer, who took nude photos. Moore's photos were taken when she was underage and the photos were sold to magazines in Japan. She eventually landed a contract with Elite Model Management. While filming No Small Affair, Moore revealed that she believed she had taken Jon Cryer's virginity during their time together on set. "I played a young nightclub singer, and Jon Cryer played the nineteen-year-old photographer who falls in love with her, in his first movie role. Jon fell for me in real life, too, and lost his virginity to me while we were making that movie," she writes.

Moore married musician Freddy Moore in 1980 and the marriage lasted for five years. She was 18 when they married and she cheated on him shortly before tying the knot. Once Moore was cast to star in St. Elmo's Fire, she was required to check into the Betty Ford clinic at age 21. Director Joel Schumacher and two of the producers of the movie had wanted to help her quit her alcohol and cocaine use so they had her admitted. "If I'd had to give up the movie and go through the program to get sober for myself, I doubt I would have done it. I just didn't value myself enough for that. But with the film at stake, and this enormous support from Craig Baumgarten, Joel Schumacher, and his colleagues, who I didn't want to let down, I had something much bigger than me to fight for. And so I did," Moore writes.

She was married to actor Bruce Willis from 1987 to 2000 and the couple had two weddings. Moore wrote that Willis eventually thought her career was taking time away from their family, and that he wasn't sure if he wanted to be married. The couple has three daughters Rumer, Scout and Tallulah. "I think Bruce was fearful at the beginning that I was going to make our split difficult, and that I would express my anger and whatever baggage that I had from our marriage by obstructing his access to the kids — that I'd turn to all of those ploys divorcing couples use as weapons. But I didn't, and neither did he," she writes. Moore became obsessed with working out after training for the film A Few Good Men, in which she played a naval lawyer. She was offered over $12 million for her role in Striptease, which was more money than any other woman in Hollywood had ever been offered at the time.

She was married to actor Ashton Kutcher before divorcing in 2013. She writes about having two threesomes with Kutcher that left her with feelings of shame. "Because we had brought in a third party into our relationship, Ashton said, that blurred the lines and, to some extent, justified what he's done," Moore writes about Kutcher cheating on her. Moore recalls a time when Kutcher told her that "I don't know if alcoholism is a real thing." She also recalls a time she was drinking with Kutcher and she passed out in a hot tub in Mexico. "Ashton had encouraged me to go in this direction. When I went too far, though, he let me know how he felt by showing a picture he'd taken of me resting my head on the toilet the night before. It seemed like a good-natured joke at the time. But it was really just shaming," she writes. Two years into her marriage to Kutcher, Moore revealed that she became pregnant at 42 and then lost her child almost six months into the pregnancy. After the couple divorced in 2013, Moore began abusing Vicodin and alcohol. During that time, her three daughters stopped speaking to her, and her former husband and friend, Bruce Willis, grew distant as well.

== Publication and promotion ==
Inside Out was published on September 24, 2019, by Harper, an imprint of HarperCollins.

On October 13, 2019, the book debuted at number one on The New York Times' combined nonfiction and hardcover nonfiction best-sellers lists. The book also debuted at number one on the Publishers Weekly Bestseller List selling 39,909 units in its first week.

Moore discussed the book in an exclusive interview with Diane Sawyer of ABC News on Good Morning America. She also appeared on The Ellen DeGeneres Show, The Late Late Show with James Corden and The Tonight Show Starring Jimmy Fallon to promote the book.

== Reception ==
Kirkus Reviews called it a "forthright revelation of hard-won survival." British newspaper The Sunday Times called the book an "astonishingly candid memoir." Vanity Fair noted that Ashton Kutcher and Jon Cryer were tweeting about Moore after her book release. Vanity Fair wrote: "When that fabled genre of celebrity memoir reenters the public consciousness, amid the bombshells and the telling all, there are these kinds of rehashes. Maybe that's the idea, and maybe you've done something right when the subjects of your memoir are back in the same tabloids they were in when the events in question were going down. Moore's emergence has been a promo tour, but also a time warp, one that can prompt all sorts of recognition. Where were you when No Small Affair dropped? When Punk'd was appointment viewing?" The Irish Times wrote: "If it is surprising to see such self-revelation from any prominent Hollywood actress – let alone one with Moore's particular accomplishments and setbacks, and who admits to a reputation for reticence – she said that writing the memoir was a necessary part of a longer process of rediscovering herself."
