= The Guardians (Grisham novel) =

2019 novel by John Grisham

- Front cover
- Author: John Grisham
- Language: English
- Genre: Legal thriller
- Publisher: Doubleday
- Publication date: October 15, 2019
- Publication place: United States
- Pages: 384
- ISBN: 978-0385544184

The Guardians is a legal thriller novel by John Grisham, focusing on the world of wrongful convictions and the struggles faced by defense attorneys in exonerating innocent people.

== Plot ==
The novel revolves around the murder of Keith Russo, a young lawyer in the small town of Seabrook, Florida. Keith was fatally shot at his desk during a late-night work session. The case quickly grew cold due to a lack of evidence, witnesses, and discernible motives. However, the investigation led to the arrest of Quincy Miller, a young Black man and former client of Keith. Despite proclaiming his innocence, Quincy was convicted and sentenced to life imprisonment. Over the course of twenty-two years, Quincy remained in prison, persistently claiming his innocence but finding no one to champion his cause. With no legal support or advocates, Quincy reached out in desperation to Guardian Ministries, a modest non-profit organization. The group, led by Cullen Post — a lawyer and Episcopal minister — is known for taking on a limited number of innocence cases, focusing on individuals wrongfully convicted and forgotten by the legal system. Cullen Post, while working on Quincy's case, uncovers a complex web of deceit involving powerful entities responsible for the murder of Keith Russo. These individuals are determined to keep Quincy incarcerated to conceal their involvement. The narrative escalates as Post realizes the peril involved in pursuing justice in this case, acknowledging that those who murdered Keith would not hesitate to kill another lawyer to protect their secrets. The story unfolds as Post navigates these dangerous waters, aiming to exonerate Quincy while confronting formidable and ruthless opposition.

== Publication ==
The novel was published on October 15, 2019. It is available in various formats including hardcover, paperbook, ebook, and audiobook.

== Reception ==
The Guardians by John Grisham has been well-received for its engaging exploration of complex legal and ethical issues, presented through a suspenseful narrative. Grisham's background as a lawyer and his involvement in legal causes have added depth and authenticity to the novel's portrayal of the legal system. Critics have praised Grisham's storytelling ability. Kirkus Reviews described the novel as suspenseful and adept at addressing significant issues within the American legal system. Jeff Ayers' review in The Philadelphia Inquirer highlighted the novel's exploration of the challenges defense attorneys face.

Book Reporter emphasized the novel's focus on wrongful convictions and the detailed process of exoneration, reflecting Grisham's passion for this subject, which is rooted in his experience as a practicing attorney. "What's Good To Read" pointed out the novel's engagement with themes of legal corruption and prejudice in the U.S. legal system, noting Grisham's legal background and involvement with the Innocence Project.
