= Flawless (2007 film) =

- Theatrical release poster
- Directed by: Michael Radford
- Written by: Edward Anderson
- Produced by: Carola Ash; Jimmy de Brabant; Stephen Margolis; Albert Martinez Martin; Michael A. Pierce; Richard Pierce; Charles Salmon; Mark Williams
- Starring: Demi Moore; Michael Caine; Lambert Wilson; Joss Ackland
- Cinematography: Richard Greatrex
- Edited by: Peter Boyle
- Music by: Stephen Warbeck
- Distributed by: Magnolia Pictures
- Release date: 11 February 2007
- Running time: 108 minutes
- Countries: United Kingdom; Luxembourg
- Language: English
- Budget: $20 million
- Box office: $6.8 million

Flawless is a 2007 British fictional heist crime film directed by Michael Radford, written by Edward Anderson, and starring Michael Caine and Demi Moore. It premiered 11 February 2007 in Germany. The film had a limited release in the United States on 28 March 2008.

== Plot ==
A reporter arrives at a restaurant to interview Laura Quinn, the only woman ever to serve as a manager at the London Diamond Corporation, for a puff piece on early female professionals. Quinn places a box on the table, opens it to reveal a massive diamond, and calmly states, “I stole it.” The reporter, stunned, assumes she has spent her life in prison.

The narrative flashes back to 1960, when Quinn works as a manager at the London Diamond Corporation. Despite her talent and diligence, she has been passed over for promotion six times. The company’s janitor, Mr. Hobbs, privately warns her that she is about to be dismissed and proposes a plan to steal a small quantity of diamonds, enough for them to retire comfortably but not enough to be noticed. Facing limited prospects and weary of being undervalued, Quinn reluctantly agrees. At a company president’s gala, she acquires the vault’s combination codes.

Quinn and Hobbs develop a plan that relies on a flaw in the corporation’s new camera system. On the day of the heist, however, Hobbs seizes the entire contents of the vault, nearly two tons of diamonds, and through an intermediary demands a £100 million ransom. The head of the insurance syndicate at King’s Row is forced to pay, which leaves him financially ruined. Quinn, who never agreed to such a massive theft, realizes she has been drawn into a far more dangerous scheme.

To control the scandal, the company hires private investigator Mr. Finch. Suspicious from the beginning, Finch closely monitors both Quinn and Hobbs. Quinn attempts to free herself from involvement by offering to return the diamonds, but Hobbs refuses, revealing neither their location nor his intentions. Unable to withdraw, she cooperates with Finch’s investigation while continuing to hide her role.

The crisis worsens when news of the theft reaches the press, and the company president suffers a heart attack under the pressure. One evening, overwhelmed while drinking with Finch, Quinn retreats to the bathroom and breaks down. When one of her diamond earrings slips down a drain, she suddenly realizes how the stolen diamonds could have been moved out of the building. After Finch leaves, she descends into the sewers beneath the corporation and finds Hobbs guarding a passageway. He pulls a gun on her, but at her feet she sees the entire cache. Hobbs confesses that he never wanted the diamonds or the ransom money. His real goal was to destroy the head of the insurance syndicate, whose delays in processing his wife’s medical claims had led to her death years earlier.

The ransom is paid, and the insurance executive dies by suicide. Hobbs vanishes. Quinn finds the remaining diamonds and calls Finch, claiming she followed a simple hunch. Although some evidence points to her involvement, Finch, now emotionally attached to her, chooses not to press charges.

The story returns to the present. Quinn explains that she resigned shortly after the incident. Some time later, she received a letter from a Swiss bank, in which Hobbs apologized for using her as the disgruntled employee he needed to access the vault. He left her the ransom money as compensation. Quinn concludes by saying that she spent the rest of her life donating the money to charities and individuals in need.

== Cast ==
- Michael Caine as Mr. Hobbs
- Demi Moore as Laura Quinn
- Lambert Wilson as Finch
- Joss Ackland as Milton Kendrick Ashtoncroft
- Constantine Gregory as Dmitriev
- Ahmed Ayman as Bondok
- Natalie Dormer as Cassie, the reporter

== Critical reception ==
The film received mixed reviews from critics. As of April 2025, the film holds a 56% approval rating on the review aggregator Rotten Tomatoes, based on 95 ratings with an average rating of 5.71 out of 10. The website's critics consensus reads: "Michael Caine's excellent performance makes Flawless something more than an average heist movie." Metacritic reported the film had an average score of 57 out of 100, based on 21 reviews.
