= Streak (film) =

2008 film by Demi Moore

- Theatrical release poster
- Directed by: Demi Moore
- Screenplay by: Allan Loeb
- Story by: Kelly Fremon; Allan Loeb
- Based on: "Streak" by Jenny Smick
- Produced by: Francesca Silvestri; Kevin Chinoy
- Starring: Brittany Snow; Rumer Willis; Sarah Wright; Madeline Zima
- Cinematography: Darren Lew
- Edited by: Adrienne Gits
- Music by: Jonathan Darling
- Production company: Freestyle
- Release date: October 14, 2008
- Running time: 16 minutes
- Country: United States
- Language: English

Streak is a 2008 American coming-of-age short film directed by Demi Moore, written by Kelly Fremon and Allan Loeb, and starring Brittany Snow and Rumer Willis. The film was Moore's first film as a director.

== Plot ==
The film focuses on a young woman stuck in a life she no longer wants with gym-rat friends and obsessive behavior. To break free, she reaches for fun in an interesting form of expression.

== Cast ==
- Brittany Snow as Baylin
- Rumer Willis as Drea
- Sarah Wright as Ashley
- Madeline Zima as Stella

== Production ==
Director Demi Moore's then 20-year-old daughter Rumer Willis starred in the film. Of directing her daughter, Moore said, "The great thing is I’m seeing her mature and operate as a complete professional. And it’s giving us, I think, another opportunity to connect in a totally different way."
