= Demi Moore =

American actress (born 1962)

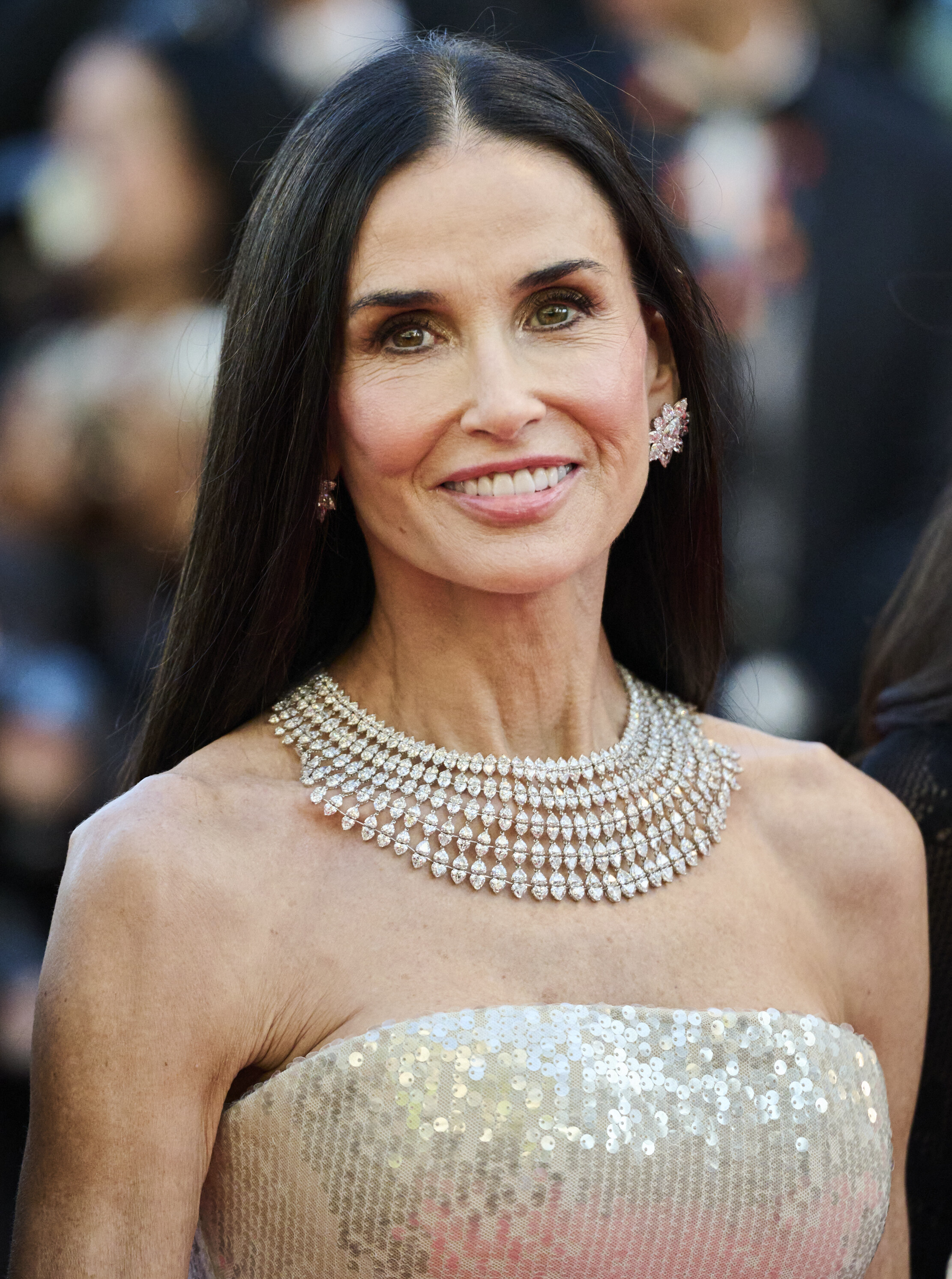
- Moore in 2026
- Born: Demi Gene Guynes; November 11, 1962 (age 64); Roswell, New Mexico, U.S.
- Occupations: Actress; producer
- Years active: 1978–present
- Works: Full list
- Spouses: Freddy Moore (m. 1981; div. 1985) Bruce Willis (m. 1987; div. 2000) Ashton Kutcher (m. 2005; div. 2013)
- Children: 3, including Rumer
- Awards: Full list

Demi Gene Moore (Note: Sources are divided as to whether her birth name is Demetria or Demi. Moore says the latter.) (/dəˈmiː/ də-MEE; née Guynes; born November 11, 1962) is an American actress and producer. After rising to prominence in the 1980s, she became the world's highest-paid actress by 1995. Her accolades include a Golden Globe, a Critics' Choice Award, and an Actor Award, and nominations for an Academy Award, a British Academy Film Award, and a Primetime Emmy Award. In 2025, she appeared on Time's 100 most influential people in the world list, and received a star on the Hollywood Walk of Fame that year.

Moore began her career as a model and joined the cast of the soap opera General Hospital in 1981. After departing the show in 1983, she rose to prominence as a member of the Brat Pack, with roles in the films Blame It on Rio (1984), St. Elmo's Fire (1985), and About Last Night... (1986). She emerged a star with her portrayal of a grieving girlfriend in the romance film Ghost (1990), had further box office success with A Few Good Men (1992), Indecent Proposal (1993), and Disclosure (1994), and received a then-unprecedented $12.5 million to star in Striptease (1996). Her output decreased significantly after The Scarlet Letter (1995), The Juror (1996) and G.I. Jane (1997) fell below commercial expectations.

Moore has sporadically held leading roles in arthouse films; supporting roles in Charlie's Angels: Full Throttle (2003), Bobby (2006), Mr. Brooks (2007), Margin Call (2011), and Rough Night (2017); as well as television credits in If These Walls Could Talk (1996), Empire (2017–2018), Feud: Capote vs. The Swans (2024), and Landman (2024–present). She gained renewed recognition for her performance as an aging celebrity in the body horror film The Substance (2024), for which she won a Golden Globe and received an Academy Award nomination for Best Actress.

Moore has been married three times. From 1981 to 1985, she was married to musician Freddy Moore. From 1987 to 2000, she was married to Bruce Willis, with whom she has three daughters. She was married to Ashton Kutcher from 2005 to 2013. Her 2019 memoir, Inside Out, reached number one on The New York Times Best Seller list. People magazine named her the most beautiful woman in the world in 2025.

== Early life ==
Demi Moore was born Demetria Gene Harmon on November 11, 1962, in Roswell, New Mexico. Her biological father, Air Force airman Charles Foster Harmon Sr., deserted her then-18-year-old mother, Virginia (née King), after a two-month marriage before Moore's birth. Charles came from Lanett, Alabama, and Virginia was born in Richmond, California, but had grown up in Roswell. Moore's maternal grandmother was raised on a farm in Elida, New Mexico. Moore has deep roots in the South Central and Southern U.S., particularly Oklahoma, Arkansas and Georgia. When she was three months old, her mother married Dan Guynes, a newspaper advertising salesman who frequently changed jobs; as a result, the family moved many times. In 1967 they had Moore's half-brother Morgan. Moore said in 1991, "My dad is Dan Guynes. He raised me. There is a man who would be considered my biological father who I don't really have a relationship with." Moore has half-siblings from Harmon's other marriages, but she does not keep in contact with them.

Moore's stepfather Dan Guynes married and divorced Virginia twice. On October 20, 1980, a year after their second divorce from each other, Guynes died by suicide. Her biological father Harmon died in 1997 from liver cancer in Brazoria, Texas. Moore's mother had a long arrest record, which included drunk driving and arson. Moore broke off contact with her mother in 1989, when she left halfway through a rehabilitation stay Moore had financed at the Hazelden Foundation in Minnesota. Virginia Guynes posed nude for the magazine High Society in 1993, where she spoofed Moore's Vanity Fair pregnancy and bodypaint covers and parodied her clay scene from Ghost. Moore and Guynes reconciled shortly before Guynes died of a brain tumor on July 2, 1998.

Moore spent her early childhood in Roswell, and later, Canonsburg, Pennsylvania. Bob Gardner, a photographer for the Monongahela Daily Herald when Dan Guynes was head of advertising, recalled that Moore "looked malnourished and not so much abused as neglected. That haunting look as a child made me feel uneasy." She suffered from strabismus, which was corrected by two operations, as well as kidney dysfunction. Moore learned that Guynes was not her real father at age 13, when she discovered a marriage certificate and inquired about the circumstances since she "saw my parents were married in February 1963. I was born in '62."

At age 14, Moore returned to her hometown of Roswell and lived with her grandmother for six months before relocating to Washington, where her recently separated mother was residing near Seattle. Several months later, the family moved again to West Hollywood, California, where Moore's mother took a job working for a magazine distribution company. Moore attended Fairfax High School there. In 2019, she stated she was raped at 15 by landlord Basil Doumas, then 49. Doumas claimed he had paid Moore's mother to get access to Moore to rape her, although Moore said it is unclear if this was true.

In November 1978, Moore moved in with 28-year-old guitarist Tom Dunston, quitting high school in her junior year to work as a receptionist at 20th Century Fox, a job she secured through Dunston's mother, who was an executive assistant to producer Douglas S. Cramer. She signed with the Elite Modeling Agency, then enrolled in acting classes after being inspired by her next-door neighbor, 17-year-old German starlet Nastassja Kinski. Moore's first and second roles as a professional actress were guest spots on the television shows W.E.B. and Kaz (though neither is listed in her IMDb filmography). In August 1979, three months before her 17th birthday, Moore met musician Freddy Moore, at the time leader of the band Boy, at the Los Angeles nightclub Troubadour. He obtained a divorce in late 1980 and married Demi six weeks later.

== Career ==
=== Beginnings and breakthrough (1980–1989) ===
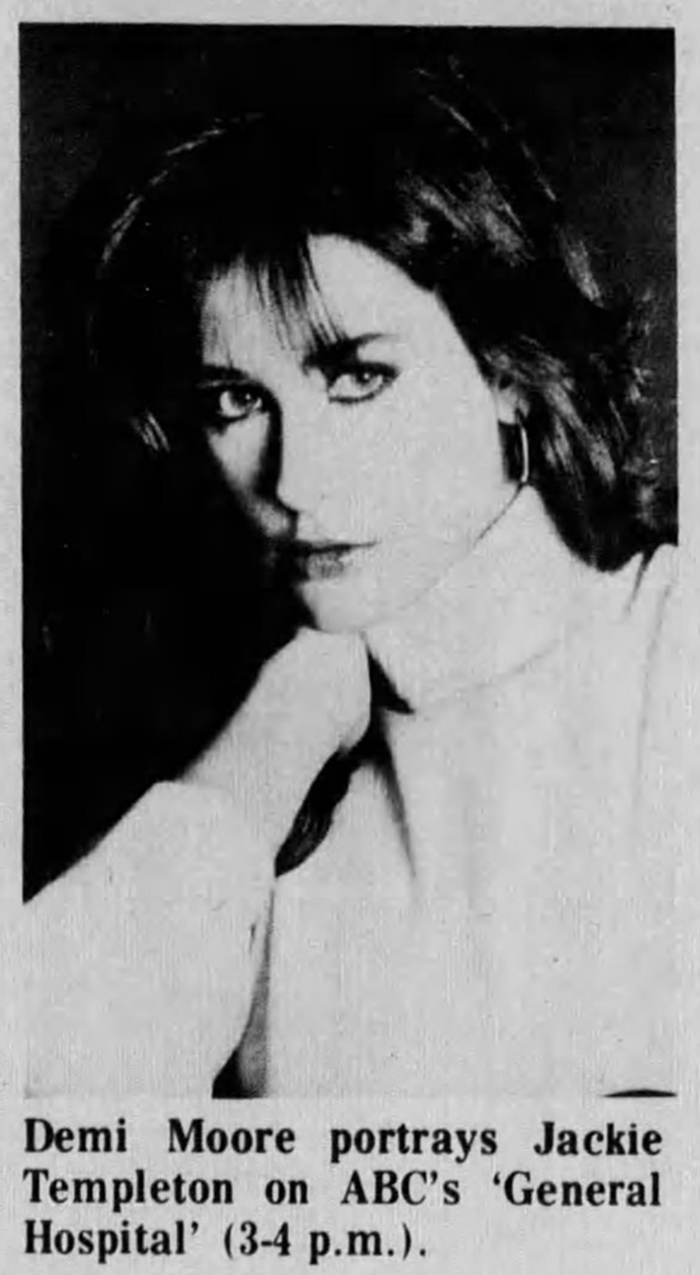
Newspaper clipping, January 29, 1982

Moore co-wrote three songs with Freddy Moore and appeared in the music video for their selection It's Not a Rumor, performed by his band, the Nu-Kats. She continues to receive royalty checks from her songwriting work (1980–1981).

Moore appeared on the cover of the January 1981 issue of the adult magazine Oui, taken from a photo session in which she had posed nude. In a 1988 interview, Moore said she "only posed for the cover of Oui—I was 16; I told them I was 18." Interviewer Alan Carter said, "However, some peekaboo shots did appear inside. And later, nude shots of her turned up in Celebrity Sleuth—photos that she once said 'were for a European fashion magazine'." In 1990, she told another interviewer, "I was 17 years old. I was underage. It was just the cover."

Moore made her film debut as the protagonist's girlfriend in Choices (1981), a sports drama directed by Silvio Narizzano. It did not garner much attention until after Moore became a household name, at which point home video releases emphasized her appearance. Her second feature was the 3-D sci-fi horror Parasite (1982), for which director Charles Band had instructed casting director Johanna Ray to "find me the next Karen Allen". It proved to be a minor hit on the drive-in circuit, ultimately grossing $7 million. Moore had already joined the cast of the ABC soap opera General Hospital several months before the film's release, playing the role of investigative reporter Jackie Templeton through 1983. During her tenure on the series, she made an uncredited cameo appearance in the 1982 spoof Young Doctors in Love.

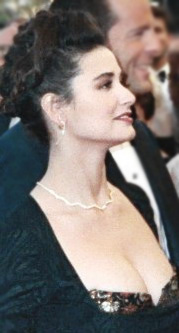
Moore at the 61st Academy Awards in 1989

Moore's film career took off in 1984 following her appearance as the teenage daughter of a businessman (played by Michael Caine) in the sex comedy Blame It on Rio. In No Small Affair (1984), she played the love interest of an amateur photographer, opposite Jon Cryer. Sheila Benson of the Los Angeles Times called her "the movie's revelation", asserting that she was "gamine, molten, wild, tragicomic and genuinely affecting". Her commercial breakthrough came with her role as an uninhibited banker in Joel Schumacher's yuppie drama St. Elmo's Fire (1985). Having lobbied for her casting, the director urged her to go to rehab before shooting and hired a full-time sober companion during production. The film received negative reviews, but was a box office success and brought her widespread recognition. Because of her association with that film, she was often listed as part of the Brat Pack, a label she felt was "demeaning".

Moore progressed to more serious material with the romantic dramedy About Last Night... (1986), in which she played one half of a Chicago couple, alongside Rob Lowe. It marked a positive turning point in her career, as Moore noted that, following its release, she began seeing better scripts. Film critic Roger Ebert gave the film four out of four stars and praised her performance, writing, "There isn't a romantic note she isn't required to play in this movie, and she plays them all flawlessly." The success of About Last Night... was unrivaled by Moore's other two 1986 releases, One Crazy Summer and Wisdom, the last youth-oriented films in which she would star.

Moore made her professional stage debut in an off-Broadway production of The Early Girl, which ran at the Circle Repertory Company in fall 1986. Mel Gussow of The New York Times deemed it a "striking debut" and observed that she "has exactly the right combination of naivete and know-how, and[…] is unabashed about the demands of the performance". In 1988, Moore starred as a prophecy-bearing mother in the apocalyptic drama The Seventh Sign—her first outing as a solo film star—and in 1989, she played the quick-witted local laundress and part-time prostitute in Neil Jordan's Depression-era allegory We're No Angels, opposite Robert De Niro and Sean Penn.

=== Established career (1990–1997) ===
Moore's most successful film to date is the supernatural romantic melodrama Ghost, which grossed over $505 million at the box office and was the highest-grossing film of 1990, as well as the most rented videocassette of 1991. She played a young woman in jeopardy to be protected by the ghost of her murdered boyfriend through the help of a reluctant psychic. The love scene between Moore and Patrick Swayze that starts in front of a potter's wheel to the sound of "Unchained Melody" has become an iconic moment in cinema history. Ghost was nominated for the Academy Award for Best Picture, while Moore's performance earned her a Golden Globe nomination and the Saturn Award for Best Actress. She started fashion trends with her uncharacteristically gamine look, and legions of women emulated the short haircut she sported throughout the film. At one point, Ghost and Die Hard 2, starring Moore's then-husband Bruce Willis, would occupy the number one and number two spots at the box office, a feat that would not be accomplished again for a married Hollywood couple until 2024.

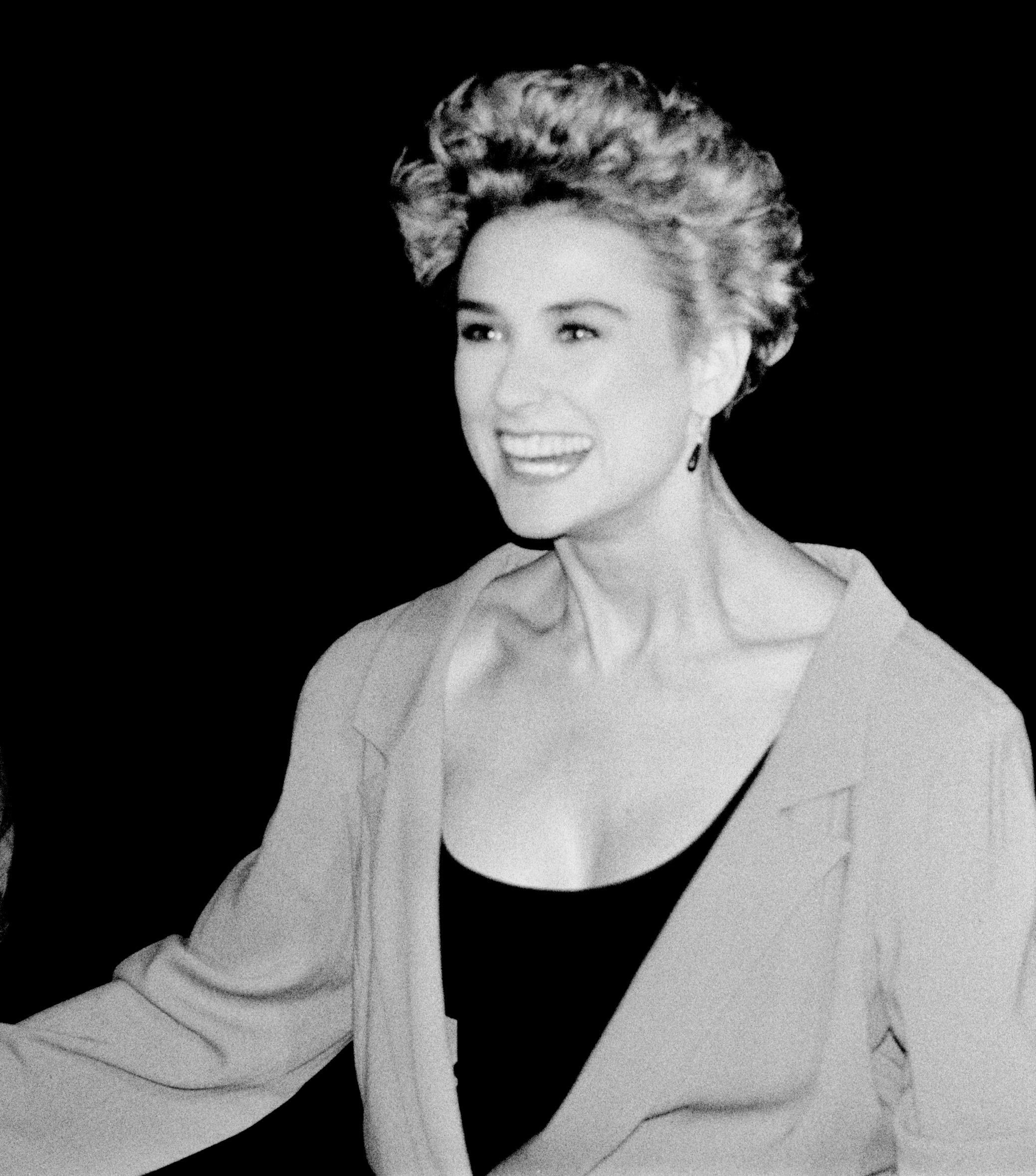
Moore at the 1990 Deauville American Film Festival

In 1991, Moore starred as a lawyer in the horror comedy Nothing but Trouble, a murder suspect in the mystery thriller Mortal Thoughts, and a clairvoyant woman in the romantic comedy The Butcher's Wife. Mortal Thoughts, which co-starred Willis, was a "passion project" for Moore, who wanted a more challenging role following the success of Ghost and was particularly drawn to her character's New Jersey dialect. After the original director was fired and replaced by Alan Rudolph, she took it upon herself to mitigate the film's financial constraints, offering to pay overtime for the shooting.

Moore received a $2.5 million fee to star in The Butcher's Wife, but later regretted making the film. It was noted that, during production, she was "catered to by an assistant, a dialogue coach, a masseuse, a psychic consultant, [her daughter]'s nanny, and a bodyguard […]—in addition to the standard-issue hairdresser, makeup person, and stand-in. She arrived for each morning's shoot in a limo and insisted on flying between locations by private plane." Screenwriter Ezra Litwak stated: "Demi is very much a movie star. Everything revolves around that fact. She knows what she wants and how to get it." The film was a critical and commercial failure, but Roger Ebert embraced her performance, describing it as "warm and cuddly".

Moore's next roles—a lieutenant commander in Rob Reiner's A Few Good Men (1992), a morally tested wife in Adrian Lyne's Indecent Proposal (1993), and a sexually charged employer in Barry Levinson's Disclosure (1994)—raised her demand among studios. The three aforementioned films opened atop the box office and were blockbuster hits. Producer Martin Shafer considered her to be "every bit as valuable as [her male counterparts]" and called her "the biggest female star in the world".

With her A-list status, some of Moore's film choices were the subject of widespread scrutiny. Her portrayal of Hester Prynne in The Scarlet Letter (1995), a "freely adapted" version of the historical romance novel by Nathaniel Hawthorne, was met with harsh disapproval. James Berardinelli found her to be "out of her depth" and noted that her "insufficient" range resulted in a "weak" performance. She played an author with commitment issues in the coming-of-age drama Now and Then (1995), which she described as "more than just a film […] it was an adventure". Now and Then did not score with critics but found box office success and cult following.

Moore became the world's highest-paid actress when she was paid a record-breaking salary of $12.5 million to star as an FBI secretary-turned-stripper in Striptease (1996). Her own daughter Rumer Willis, who was 7 years old when the film was released, played her character's daughter. Despite grossing a respectable $113 million worldwide, Striptease was heavily disliked. Brian D. Johnson of Maclean's was critical of Moore's acting and described the film as a "tacky" display of her vanity. She starred as a single mother intimidated by a mobster in the thriller The Juror (1996), which did not connect with critics nor audiences. For both Striptease and The Juror, she received the Golden Raspberry Award for Worst Actress.

Moore produced and starred in HBO's If These Walls Could Talk (1996), a three-part anthology about abortion alongside Sissy Spacek and Cher. Its screenwriter, Nancy Savoca, directed two segments, including one in which Moore played a widowed nurse in the early 1950s seeking a back-alley abortion. If These Walls Could Talk became HBO's highest-rated original film to date, drawing 6.9 million viewers. For the film, Moore received Golden Globe nominations for Best Actress – Miniseries or Television Film and Best Miniseries or Motion Picture Made for Television, as well as a Primetime Emmy Award nomination for Outstanding Television Movie. In 1996, she provided the voice of Esmeralda in The Hunchback of Notre Dame, and Dallas Grimes in Beavis and Butt-Head Do America, both of which were the highest-grossing animated films that year.

Moore portrayed the first woman to undergo training in the Navy SEALs in Ridley Scott's G.I. Jane (1997). For her role, she shaved her head and went through a rigorous two-week military training. The film received mixed reviews and earned her another Golden Raspberry Award for Worst Actress, but her performance was largely praised by critics. Budgeted at $50 million, it was a moderate commercial success, grossing $98.4 million worldwide. Striptease and G.I. Jane were considered to have contributed to a professional downturn, on which she later remarked: "With Striptease, it was as if I had betrayed women, and with G.I. Jane, it was as if I had betrayed men." Nevertheless, she has described G.I. Jane as one of her proudest professional achievements. In 1997, she played an ultrapious Jewish convert psychiatrist in Woody Allen's Deconstructing Harry, and an emotionally estranged wife in Mark Pellington's short film Destination Anywhere.

=== Hiatus and sporadic roles (1998–2007) ===
After G.I. Jane, Moore retreated from the limelight and moved to Hailey, Idaho, on a full-time basis to devote herself to raising her three daughters. She was off-screen for three years before re-emerging in the arthouse psychological drama Passion of Mind (2000), the first English-language film from Belgian director Alain Berliner. Her performance as a woman with dissociative identity disorder was favourably reviewed, but the film was deemed "naggingly slow" by some critics and failed to find an audience. She felt that Passion of Mind "didn't get the best of [her]" due to the death of her mother and her divorce from Willis. She then resumed her self-imposed career hiatus and continued to turn down film offers. Producer Irwin Winkler said in 2001, "I had a project about a year and a half ago, and we made an inquiry about her—a real good commercial picture. She wasn't interested."

Moore returned to the screen, playing a villain, in Charlie's Angels: Full Throttle (2003), opposite Cameron Diaz, Drew Barrymore, and Lucy Liu. Her role was specifically written for her and proved, according to Barrymore, to have "upstaged" the film's heroines. A scene, in particular, featuring her in a swimsuit, attracted "very heightened" media attention. She found herself intimidated by the response, which she said made her question her place in the industry. Peter Travers of Rolling Stone remarked: "It's a relief when Demi Moore shows up as [a] fallen angel ... Moore, 40, looks great in a bikini and doesn't even try to act. Her unsmiling sexiness cuts through the gigglefest as the angels fight, kick, dance and motocross like Indiana Jones clones on estrogen." A commercial success, Full Throttle made $259.1 million worldwide, but it was followed by yet another three-year absence from the screen. In the interim, she signed on as the face of Versace and Helena Rubinstein.

After a leading role as a grieving novelist in the mystery thriller Half Light (2006), Moore reunited with Emilio Estevez for his drama Bobby (2006), about the hours leading up to the Robert F. Kennedy assassination, in which she portrayed an alcoholic singer whose career is on the downswing. As a member of the ensemble cast, she was nominated for the Screen Actors Guild Award for Best Cast in a Motion Picture and won the Hollywood Film Festival Award for Best Ensemble Cast.

Moore reunited with Blame It on Rio co-star Michael Caine for the British heist drama Flawless (2007), which saw her portray an American executive helping to steal a handful of diamonds from the London Diamond Corporation during the 1960s. Rene Rodriguez of the Miami Herald asserted: "The inspired pairing of Demi Moore and Michael Caine as a pair of thieves in the diamond-heist semi-caper movie Flawless goes a long way toward overcoming the film's slack, leisurely pacing." She appeared as a driven police officer investigating a serial killer in the psychological thriller Mr. Brooks (2007). Critic Peter Travers felt that her role "deserved better than being saddled with an absurd back story as an heiress with a fortune-hunting husband". Mr. Brooks was profitable, grossing $48.1 million worldwide.

=== Independent films and varied ventures (2008–2023) ===
Moore made her directorial debut with the coming-of-age short film Streak (2008), which starred her daughter Rumer and screened at the Nashville Film Festival. In 2009, Moore played a daughter helping her father deal with age-related health problems in the dramedy Happy Tears, as well as a stealth marketer in the comedy The Joneses. The latter film was largely highlighted, with critics concluding that it "benefits from its timely satire of consumer culture" as well as a "strong" performance from Moore. That year, she acted in the 9th edition of 24 Hour Plays on Broadway at the American Airlines Theatre. In Bunraku (2010), a film Moore described as a "big action adventure", she starred as a courtesan and a femme fatale with a secret past.

Moore portrayed a chief risk management officer at a large Wall Street investment bank during the initial stages of the 2008 financial crisis in the corporate drama Margin Call (2011), in which she was part of an ensemble cast that included Kevin Spacey, Simon Baker, and Paul Bettany. The film was favourably received, and earned the cast nominations for Best Ensemble from the Gotham Awards, the Phoenix Film Critics Society and the Central Ohio Film Critics Association. She was nominated for a Directors Guild of America Award in the category of Outstanding Directing – Miniseries or TV Film for her work as a director in a segment of the Lifetime anthology film Five (2011).

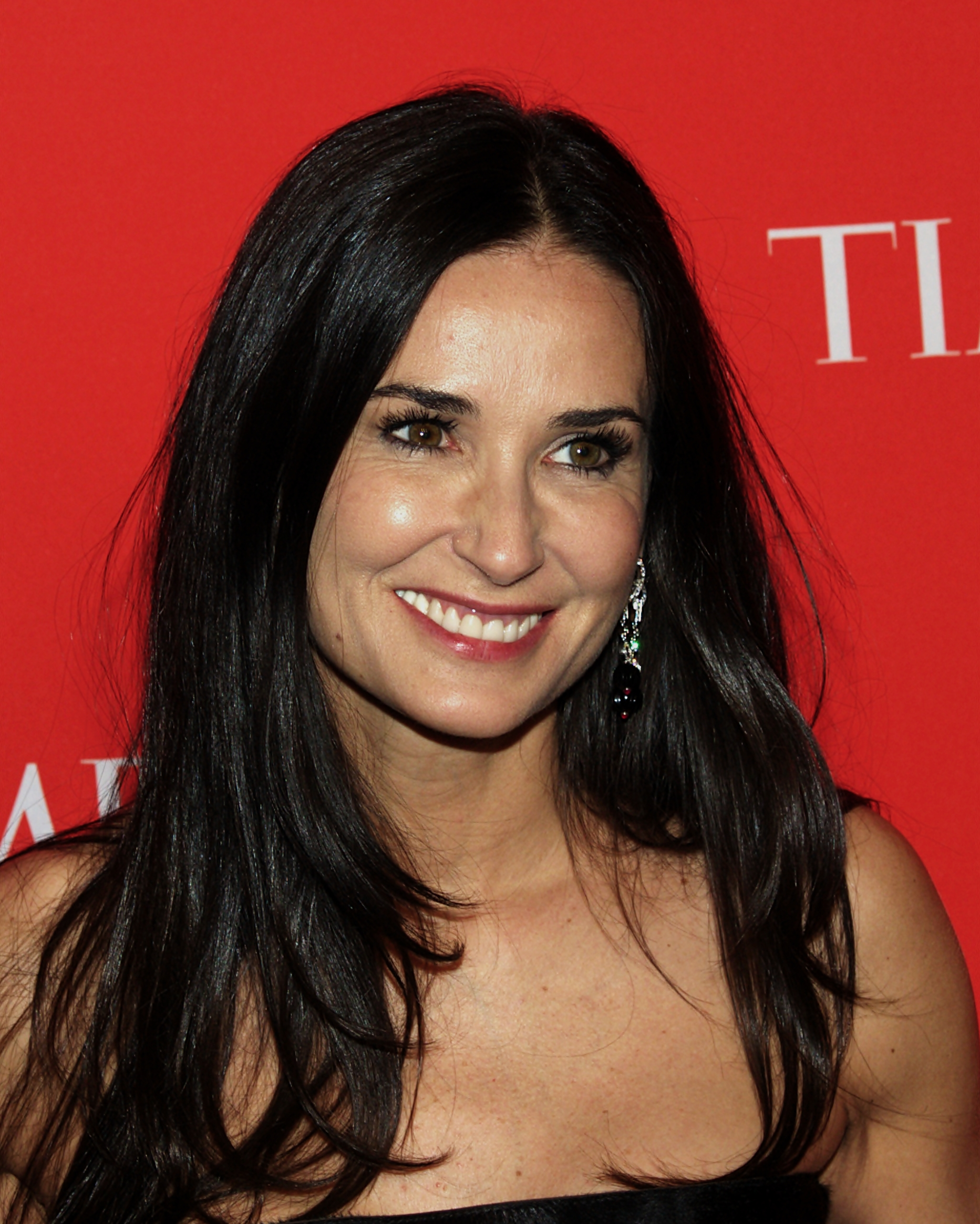
Moore in 2010

During this period, Moore's career was noted to have shifted into "smaller movies and smaller roles". She played a "brash and overtly sexual second wife" in the black comedy Another Happy Day (2011), mothers in the coming-of-age films LOL (2012) and Very Good Girls (2013), an old flame of a quick-draw killer in the Western drama Forsaken (2015), the daughter of a retired high school teacher in the road comedy Wild Oats (2016), and the neglected wife of an indicted businessman in the drama Blind (2017). David Fear of Rolling Stone described her as "someone who, despite the fact that she still graces screens […], makes you feel as if they’ve gone into self-exile in order to survive".

Between 2017 and 2018, Moore had a recurring arc as a mysterious take-charge nurse on Empire. The comedy Rough Night (2017) featured her as one half of a swinger couple seducing a member of a bachelorette party. Alonso Duralde for TheWrap called her "wonderfully skeevy", but Tim Grierson for Screen Daily considered her part to be a "wobbly subplot" of the film. Her only wide theatrical release of the decade, Rough Night made $47.3 million globally. She played a social worker in the Hindi-language drama Love Sonia (2018), and an unethical CEO in the black comedy Corporate Animals (2019).

Moore's memoir, Inside Out, in which she discusses her childhood, relationships and personal struggles, was published in September 2019, by HarperCollins. The book reached number one on The New York Times' combined print & e-book nonfiction best-sellers list and the hardcover nonfiction best-sellers list.

In 2020, Moore played a protective matriarch in the thriller Songbird, recurred as the mother of a subversive outsider in three episodes of Brave New World, and was among the celebrities who made cameo appearances modeling lingerie at Rihanna's Savage x Fenty Show Vol. 2. That year, she served as a producer and played the title role in the podcast Dirty Diana. Moore recorded the project from her bathroom and saw it as an opportunity to explore sexuality through a sex positive message.

Moore's supporting turn as an eccentric neighbor in the musical drama Please Baby Please (2022) earned her positive notices. Tara Brady of The Irish Times found her to be a "marvel" in her role. Writing for Variety, Manuel Betancourt felt that the film "understands one should always give Demi Moore a movie star entrance […] we're encouraged to get lost in the fantasy Moore creates for us". She played a cameo as Nicolas Cage's in-movie fictional ex-wife in The Unbearable Weight of Massive Talent (2022).

=== Renewed critical success (2024–present) ===
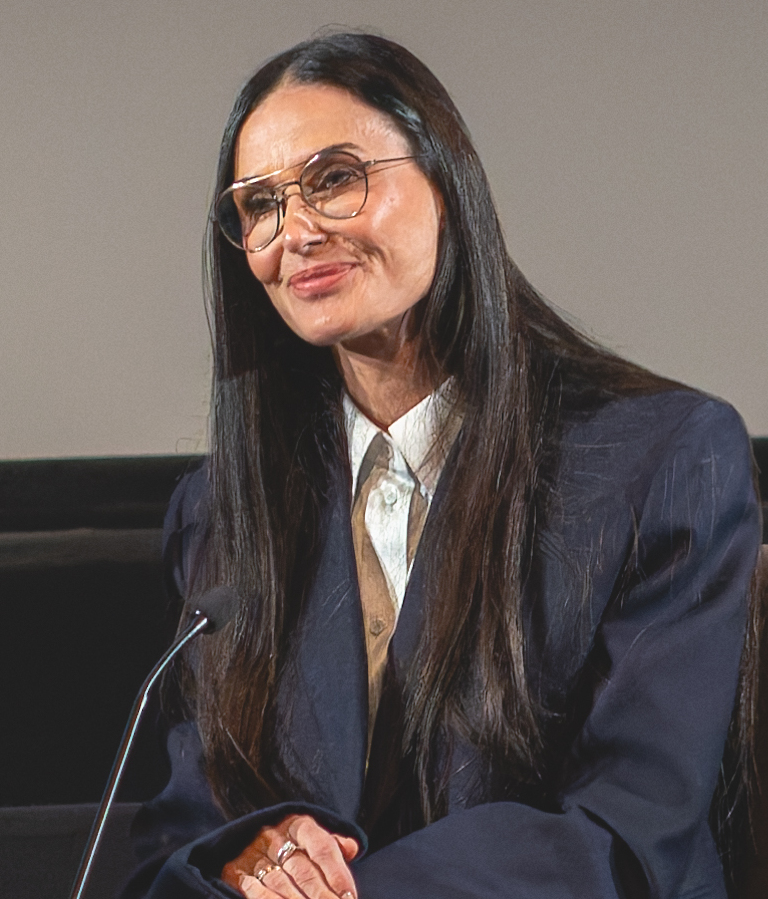
Moore in 2024

In 2024, Moore played socialite Ann Woodward in the Ryan Murphy anthology series Feud: Capote vs. The Swans on FX, and began starring as the wife of an oil tycoon in Taylor Sheridan's drama series Landman on Paramount+.

In Coralie Fargeat's body horror film The Substance (2024), Moore played an aging star who uses a black market drug to make herself younger. It premiered at the 2024 Cannes Film Festival, and Moore's performance was praised by critics. Nicholas Barber of BBC called it "her best big-screen role in decades" and praised her for being "fearless in parodying her public image". Phil de Semlyen of Time Out believed Moore "glues it all together, going full Isabelle Adjani-in-Possession in a vanity-free performance full of bruised ego, dawning horror and vulnerability". She won the Golden Globe Award for Best Actress in a Motion Picture – Musical or Comedy, the Critics' Choice Movie Award for Best Actress, and the Actor Award for Outstanding Performance by a Female Actor in a Leading Role, and was nominated for the BAFTA Award for Best Actress and the Academy Award for Best Actress.

In March 2025, feminist art critic Jan Lisa Huttner honored Demi Moore at SWAN Day events in New York City and Chicago for her performances in The Substance and Ghost, the film which previously earned her a nomination at the Golden Globe Awards. Huttner was inspired to do so after watching Moore's Golden Globe acceptance speech, which she called "one of the bravest, most heart-felt acceptance speeches ever." She went on to write:

Demi’s powerhouse role in The Substance — a film written and directed by a woman — earned Demi Golden Globe, Critics’ Choice, and SAG awards in the Best Actress category, culminating her first ever Oscar nomination, all of which demonstrate Demi’s importance as a formidable female force in the film industry. And her impeccable collaboration with Coralie [Fargeat] on The Substance has amplified the conversation surrounding the importance of expanding women’s roles behind-the-scenes in cinema.

In April 2025, Moore was chosen People's World's Most Beautiful of 2025. On May 9, 2025, it was announced that Moore would star alongside actor Colman Domingo in the film Strange Arrivals, directed by Roger Ross Williams, based on the true story of Betty and Barney Hill, an interracial couple who, in 1961, became the first reported case of an alien abduction. In 2026, Moore starred as villainous fashion designer Christie Smith in Boots Riley's film I Love Boosters. On April 15, 2026, it was announced that Moore had been cast in the lead for David Weil's upcoming thriller Tyrant, for Amazon MGM.

== Public image ==
=== Status and persona ===
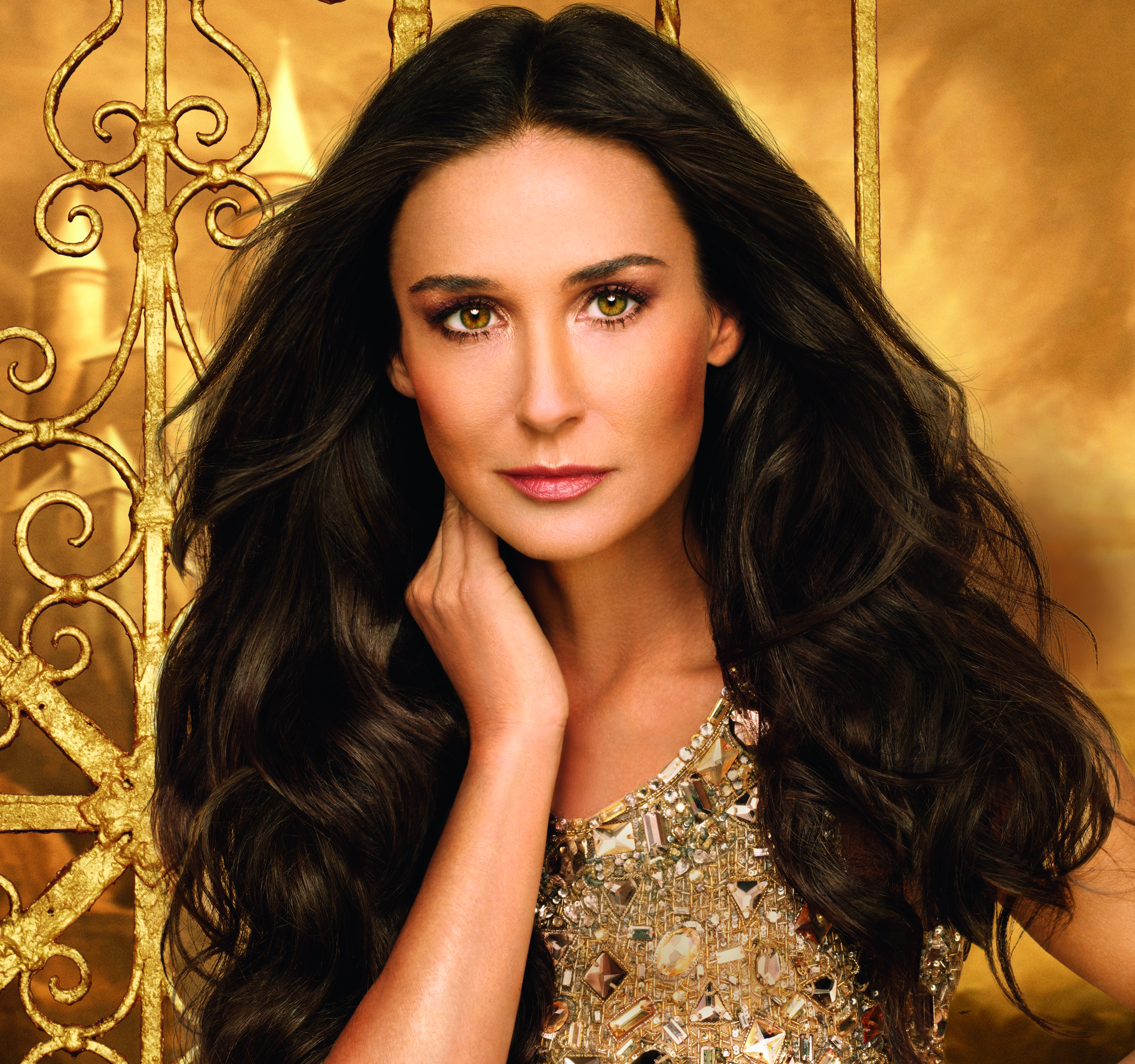
Moore in an advertisement for Swedish cosmetic company Oriflame in 2012

Moore is viewed as a pioneer for equal salary for women in Hollywood. She was paid $12.5 million for her role in Striptease, which was more money than any other actress had ever been offered at the time. Producers for Striptease and G.I. Jane got into a bidding war to see who could get her to film first. Striptease won and Moore became the world's highest-paid actress in 1995. According to Entertainment Weekly, Moore's fee for the film caused a "reverse domino effect" in the industry, as "Sharon Stone's asking price jumped from $6 million to $7 million, Jodie Foster went from $7 million to $8 million, Meg Ryan moved from $6 million to $8 million, and Julia Roberts leaped from $12 million to $13 million." She became a teen icon in the 1980s, and by the 1990s was the most sought-after woman in Hollywood, establishing herself as a sex symbol and one of the bankable stars.

During the production of G.I. Jane, it was reported that Moore had ordered studio chiefs to charter two planes for her entourage and her, which reinforced her negative reputation for being a diva—she had previously turned down the Sandra Bullock role in While You Were Sleeping because the studio refused to meet her salary demands, and was dubbed "Gimme Moore" by the media. Retrospectively, Lifetime called her a "pioneer for other actresses by being the first female lead to demand the same salary, benefits and billing as her male counterparts". Profiling Moore in 2007, The Guardian observed: "Her screen persona always has something indestructible about it. There's a toughness, a strength, a determination." She was the subject of an E! True Hollywood Story special in 2003 and of a Celebrity Style Story special in 2012.

Moore has been included in a number of magazine lists of the world's most beautiful women. In 1996, she was selected as one of People magazine's 50 Most Beautiful People. In 1999, she was a guest editor for the November issue of Marie Claire, and was ranked eighth on Forbes' list of Top 20 Actresses, based on three separate lists of box office receipts. In 2004, People ranked her ninth on their list of All-Time Most Beautiful Women. In 2006, she was voted seventh on Life & Style's Best Dressed Female poll. In December 2019, The Wall Street Journal listed a cover story about Moore as one of their most-read stories in the year. In 2025, she was placed at number one on People's annual list of 100 Most Beautiful People, and was one of Time magazine's The 100 Most Influential People of 2025.

Moore has 4.66 million followers on Twitter, as of March 2020. She uses Twitter as a platform to raise awareness of sex trafficking and slavery. "She is practicing what she preaches: More than half of her posts are on the subject, directing followers where to get involved", Harper's Bazaar reported in August 2010. Moore remarked: "I like to connect to people in the virtual world [...] exchanging thoughts and ideas, when in the physical world we might never have the opportunity to cross paths." As of March 2024, Moore has 6.1 million Instagram followers.

Moore has graced the cover of numerous international fashion magazines, including W, Vanity Fair, Interview, Rolling Stone, Glamour, InStyle, Time and Vogue. She posed nude on the October 2019 cover of Harper's Bazaar. As of 2024, she has appeared on magazine covers every year since 1980. Moore has appeared in television commercials for Keds, Oscar Mayer, Diet Coke, Lux, Jog Mate, and Seibu Department Stores, and print ads for Versace and Ann Taylor. She became a global brand ambassador for Kérastasein 2026.

=== Vanity Fair covers ===
In August 1991, Moore appeared nude on the cover of Vanity Fair under the title More Demi Moore. Annie Leibovitz shot the picture while Moore was seven months pregnant with her second child, Scout LaRue Willis, intending to portray "anti-Hollywood, anti-glitz" attitude. The cover drew significant attention and was widely discussed in the media. The frankness of Leibovitz's portrayal of a pregnant sex symbol led to divided opinions, ranging from suggestions of sexual objectification to celebrations of the photograph as a symbol of empowerment.

The photograph was subject to numerous parodies, including the Spy magazine version, which placed Moore's then-husband Bruce Willis's head on the body of a male model with a false belly. In Leibovitz v. Paramount Pictures Corp., Leibovitz sued over one parody featuring Leslie Nielsen, made to promote the 1994 film Naked Gun 33 1/3: The Final Insult. In the parody, the model's body was attached to what is described as "the guilty and smirking face" of Nielsen. The teaser said "Due this March." The case was dismissed in 1996 because the parody relied "for its comic effect on the contrast between the original". In November 2009, the Moroccan magazine Femmes du Maroc emulated the pose with Moroccan news reporter Nadia Larguet, causing controversy in the majority-Muslim nation.

In August 1992, Moore again appeared nude on the cover of Vanity Fair, this time modeling for body painting artist Joanne Gair in Demi's Birthday Suit.

== Personal life ==
=== Marriages and relationships ===
On February 8, 1981, at the age of 18, Moore married singer Freddy Moore, then 30 and recently divorced from his first wife. Before their marriage, Demi had already begun using Freddy's surname as her stage name. The pair separated in 1983, after which Demi had a relationship with Timothy Hutton. She filed for divorce from Freddy in September 1984; it was finalized on August 7, 1985. Moore was then engaged to actor Emilio Estevez, with whom she co-starred in St. Elmo's Fire and Wisdom, a crime drama he also wrote and directed. The pair planned to marry on December 6, 1986, but called off the engagement after a woman filed a $2 million paternity suit against Estevez.

On November 21, 1987, Moore married her second husband, actor Bruce Willis. She and Willis had three daughters: Rumer Glenn Willis (born 1988), Scout LaRue Willis (born 1991), and Tallulah Belle Willis (born 1994). They announced their separation on June 24, 1998, and divorced on October 18, 2000. Despite the divorce, Moore maintains a close friendship with Willis and his current wife Emma Heming Willis, and has assisted her and their respective children with caretaking for Willis as his health has declined. Moore had a three-year romance with martial arts instructor Oliver Whitcomb, whom she dated from 1999 to 2002.

In 2003, Moore began dating actor Ashton Kutcher. Soon after they began dating, Moore became pregnant and she suffered a stillbirth six months into the pregnancy. They married on September 24, 2005. The wedding was attended by about 150 close friends and family of the couple, including Willis. In November 2011, after months of media speculation about the state of the couple's marriage, Moore announced her decision to end her marriage to Kutcher. After over a year of separation, Kutcher filed for divorce from Moore on December 21, 2012, in the Los Angeles County Superior Court, citing irreconcilable differences. Moore filed her response papers in March 2013, requesting spousal support and payment of legal fees from Kutcher. On November 26, 2013, their divorce was finalized.

=== Beliefs and interests ===
Politically, Moore is a supporter of the Democratic Party.

Moore was at one point a follower of Philip Berg's Kabbalah Centre religion, and initiated Ashton Kutcher into the faith, having said that she "didn't grow up Jewish, but ... would say that [she has] been more exposed to the deeper meanings of particular rituals than any of [her] friends that did". She is no longer affiliated with Berg's organization.

Moore has varying interest on Indian Spirituality and follows Mata Amritanandamayi.

According to The New York Times, Moore is "the world's most high-profile doll collector", and among her favorites is the Gene Marshall fashion doll. She has reportedly kept a separate residence to house her 2,000 dolls. Moore is also a fan of soccer and supports Arsenal F.C.

== Activism and philanthropy ==
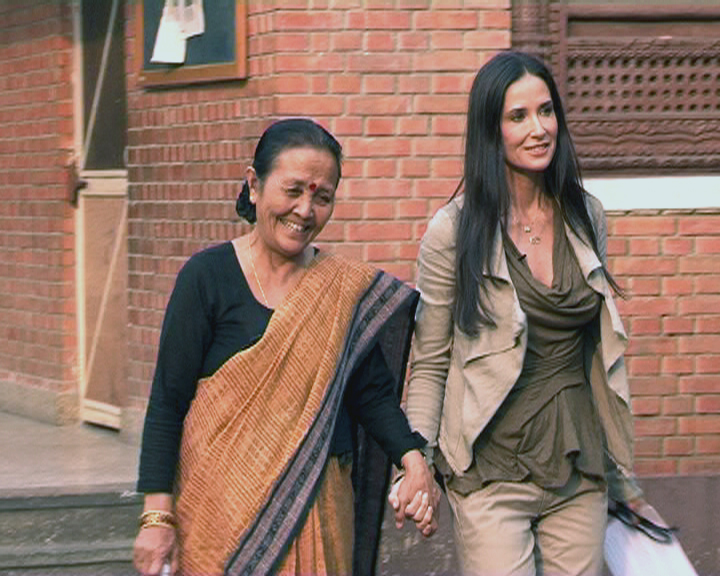
Moore with Anuradha Koirala during a visit to Nepal in 2011

Moore has supported numerous charities, including All Day Foundation, American Foundation for AIDS Research, Artists for Peace and Justice, Coalition to Abolish Slavery and Trafficking, Declare Yourself, Free the Slaves, Healthy Child Healthy World, Raising Malawi, The Art of Elysium and UNICEF. In 2010, Moore defeated Kevin Bacon to win $250,000 in the Pepsi Refresh Celebrity Challenge. She chose to support the organization Girls Educational and Mentoring Services, a non-profit group which aims to empower young women who have been the victims of commercial sexual exploitation and trafficking. She traveled to Haiti with the Artists for Peace and Justice following the 2010 Haiti earthquake. She has also supported Chrysalis, a non-profit organization which offers employment opportunities to the homeless.

Moore became a special contributor to the CNN Freedom Project and traveled to Nepal to meet with 2010 CNN Hero of the Year Anuradha Koirala and her organization, Maiti Nepal, which has rescued more than 12,000 stolen Nepalese children from sex trafficking since 1993. She was the narrator and anchor of CNN's documentary on child trafficking, called Nepal's Stolen Children, which aired on June 26, 2011. In the documentary, Moore talked to Nepal's prime minister, Jhalanath Khanal, and young girls who were forced into prostitution before being saved by a Nepalese nonprofit. She appeared on PETA's Worst-Dressed List in 2009 for wearing fur, but two years later, she supported the group's efforts to ban circus workers' use of bullhooks on elephants.

In 2009, Moore and Kutcher launched the Demi and Ashton Foundation (DNA), a nonprofit, non-governmental organization directed towards fighting child sexual slavery. The foundation's first campaign included several celebrities, including Justin Timberlake, Sean Penn, Bradley Cooper appearing in a series of viral videos proclaiming: "Real Men Don't Buy Girls." In November 2012, the foundation said it was renaming as Thorn: Digital Defenders of Children, which aimed "to disrupt and deflate the predatory behavior of those who abuse and traffic children, solicit sex with children or create and share child pornography". Thorn assisted law enforcement in identifying 5,894 child sex trafficking victims and rescuing 103 children from "situations where their sexual abuse was recorded and distributed" in 2017, according to the organization's impact report that year. In 2018, Los Angeles-based nonprofit organization, Visionary Women honored Moore with its inaugural Visionary Woman Award for her work to combat human trafficking. In 2022, Thorn found 824,466 child sexual abuse material files and identified 1,895 victims of child sexual abuse. She received the Courage Award at The Women's Cancer Research Fund's gala in 2024.

== Acting credits and accolades ==
Moore is the recipient of numerous accolades, including a Golden Globe Award, a Critics' Choice Movie Award and an Actor Award, as well as nominations for an Academy Award, a British Academy Film Award, a Primetime Emmy Award, a Directors Guild of America Award, and two Independent Spirit Awards.

Her highest-grossing and most-positively reviewed films, according to the online portal Box Office Mojo and the review-aggregation website Rotten Tomatoes, include:

- About Last Night... (1986)
- Ghost (1990)
- A Few Good Men (1992)
- Indecent Proposal (1993)
- Disclosure (1994)
- If These Walls Could Talk (1996)
- The Hunchback of Notre Dame (1996)
- Beavis and Butt-Head Do America (1996)
- Deconstructing Harry (1997)
- Charlie's Angels: Full Throttle (2003)
- The Joneses (2009)
- Margin Call (2011)
- Please Baby Please (2022)
- The Substance (2024)
- I Love Boosters (2026)

== Bibliography ==
- Moore, Demi (2019). Inside Out: A Memoir. New York: Harper. ISBN 978-0-06-204953-7.
