= Disclosure (1994 film) =

Film by Barry Levinson

- Theatrical release poster
- Directed by: Barry Levinson
- Screenplay by: Paul Attanasio
- Based on: Disclosure by Michael Crichton
- Produced by: Michael Crichton; Barry Levinson
- Starring: Michael Douglas; Demi Moore; Donald Sutherland; Caroline Goodall; Dennis Miller
- Cinematography: Tony Pierce-Roberts
- Edited by: Stu Linder
- Music by: Ennio Morricone
- Distributed by: Warner Bros.
- Release date: December 9, 1994
- Running time: 128 minutes
- Country: United States
- Language: English
- Budget: $55 million
- Box office: $214 million

Disclosure is a 1994 American psychological thriller film directed by Barry Levinson, starring Michael Douglas and Demi Moore. It is based on the novel by Michael Crichton, released the same year. The cast includes Donald Sutherland, Caroline Goodall and Dennis Miller. Douglas plays Tom Sanders, an employee whose ex-girlfriend Meredith Johnson (Moore), an executive, files a sexual harassment complaint after she fails to seduce him. Disclosure was released by Warner Bros. on December 9, 1994, received mixed reviews from critics and grossed $214 million against its $50 million budget.

== Plot ==
Bob Garvin, founder and CEO of technology company DigiCom, plans to retire after a merger with a textbook company. Manufacturing chief Tom Sanders expects to succeed him, but Garvin instead appoints Tom's ex-girlfriend Meredith Johnson as his heir apparent, wanting to "break the glass ceiling". After calling Tom to her office over a problem with a new line of CD-ROM drives, Meredith seduces him. He permits her to perform oral sex but refuses intercourse, prompting her to threaten him.

The following morning, Tom learns that Meredith has filed a sexual harassment complaint against him with legal counsel Philip Blackburn. To protect the merger, which would cost Garvin $100 million if it collapsed, DigiCom officials demand that Tom accept reassignment to Texas. This would cost him his stock options, damage his career and leave him jobless when the site is sold after the merger.

An anonymous e-mail from "A Friend" directs Tom to Catherine Alvarez, an attorney specialising in sexual harassment. Tom sues DigiCom, alleging that Meredith harassed him, straining his marriage to Susan Hendler and his relationships with colleagues. During mediation, Meredith tearfully blames Tom. Garvin, convinced the merger depends on Meredith, offers Tom his position if he drops the lawsuit.

Tom then realises that he accidentally called colleague Mark Lewyn's voicemail during his encounter with Meredith, recording the entire incident. He rejects Garvin's offer and plays the recording at the next meeting, discrediting Meredith. She claims that Tom's protests were expressions of a desire to be dominated.

DigiCom agrees to remove Meredith quietly after the merger. However, another e-mail from "A Friend" warns Tom that the situation is not over. He overhears Blackburn telling Meredith that, although they lost the sexual harassment case, they will make Tom appear incompetent at the merger conference by blaming him for problems with the CD-ROM production line in Malaysia, which he oversees.

Tom finds his database access revoked, but uses a virtual reality device to access company files and discovers Meredith deleting them. His Malaysian colleague Mohammed Jafar sends him incriminating memos and videos showing that Meredith and a Malaysian operations chief altered Tom's production specifications to gain government favour and reduce costs, making DigiCom appear more profitable. These changes caused the production problems. Meredith, with Blackburn's support, staged the sexual encounter to force Tom out and conceal her mistakes.

At the conference, Meredith blames Tom for the production failures. Tom reveals that she authorised the changes and, when she denies visiting the plant, plays Malaysian news footage showing her there. Meredith is fired. While clearing her office, she tells Tom that Garvin's unexpected opposition has disillusioned her.

After the merger, Garvin appoints corporate counsel Stephanie Kaplan to head the Seattle operation, with Tom's support. Stephanie makes Tom her second-in-command. Tom asks her son Spencer, a University of Washington student, whether he knows "A Friend". Spencer reveals that he is Professor Arthur Friend's research assistant. Tom realises Spencer had access to Friend's e-mail account, allowing Stephanie to warn him anonymously. Tom happily resumes his role as head of manufacturing.

== Cast ==
- Michael Douglas as Tom Sanders
- Demi Moore as Meredith Johnson
- Donald Sutherland as Bob Garvin
- Caroline Goodall as Susan Hendler Sanders
- Dylan Baker as Philip Blackburn
- Roma Maffia as Catherine Alvarez
- Dennis Miller as Mark Lewyn
- Allan Rich as Ben Heller
- Nicholas Sadler as Don Cherry
- Rosemary Forsyth as Stephanie Kaplan
- Suzie Plakson as Mary Anne Hunter
- Jacqueline Kim as Cindy Chang
- Joe Urla as John Conley Jr.
- Trevor Einhorn as Matt Sanders
- Kate Williamson as Judge Barbara Murphy
- Donal Logue as Chance Geer
- Farrah Forke as Adele Lewyn
- David Drew Gallagher as Spencer Kaplan
- Wayne Duvall as Executive
- Jesse Dizon as Mohammed Jafar (voice)

== Production ==
Michael Crichton sold the movie rights for $1 million before the novel was published. Miloš Forman was originally attached to direct but left due to creative differences with Crichton. Barry Levinson and Alan J. Pakula were in contention to take the helm and Levinson was hired.

Annette Bening was originally set to play Meredith Johnson until she became pregnant and soon dropped out. Geena Davis and Michelle Pfeiffer were then considered before Levinson decided to cast Demi Moore. Crichton wrote the character Mark Lewyn for the film specifically with Dennis Miller in mind. The character from the book was somewhat modified for the screenplay to fit Miller's personality.

The visual effects and animation for the film, including in particular the virtual reality corridor sequence, were all created and designed by the visual effects technicians at Industrial Light & Magic.

=== Filming locations ===
The movie was filmed in and around Seattle, Washington. The fictional corporation DigiCom is located in Pioneer Square, on a set which was constructed for the film. Production designer Neil Spisak said, "DigiCom needed to have a hard edge to it, with lots of glass and a modern look juxtaposed against the old red brick which is indigenous to the Pioneer Square area of Seattle. Barry liked the idea of using glass so that wherever you looked you'd see workers in their offices or stopping to chat. This seemed to fit the ominous sense that Barry was looking for, a sort of Rear Window effect, where you're looking across at people in their private spaces."

Also shown are the Washington State Ferries and Capt. Johnston Blakely Elementary School on Bainbridge Island, where Michael Douglas' character Tom Sanders' family lives. Other locations include Washington Park Arboretum, Volunteer Park, the Fairmont Olympic Hotel on University St., Pike Place Market and Smith Tower, which stood in for Catherine Alvarez (Roma Maffia)'s law office. The director of photography was British cinematographer Tony Pierce-Roberts.

=== Marketing ===
The film's marketing touted it as the first Hollywood movie with major stars to address the topic of sexual harassment. The press kit for the film was the first multimedia press kit issued by Warner Bros., with them producing it on floppy disk.

== Soundtrack ==
The score of Disclosure was composed, orchestrated and conducted by Ennio Morricone. Original Motion Picture Soundtrack from the Film Disclosure was released by Virgin Records on January 24, 1995.

=== Track listing ===
1. "Serene Family" − 4:11
2. "An Unusual Approach" − 7:07
3. "With Energy and Decision" − 2:07
4. "Virtual Reality" − 6:24
5. "Preparation and Victory" − 4:04
6. "Disclosure" − 0:49
7. "Sad Family" − 1:29
8. "Unemployed!" − 1:10
9. "Sex and Computers" − 2:50
10. "Computers and Work" − 2:00
11. "Sex and Power" − 2:33
12. "First Passacaglia" − 4:21
13. "Second Passacaglia" − 1:41
14. "Third Passacaglia" − 4:33
15. "Sex, Power and Computers" − 4:23

== Release ==
=== Box office ===
Disclosure was a financial success, grossing $214 million worldwide ($83 million in U.S. and Canadian ticket sales and $131 million in other territories), against a budget of about $55 million. It became one of director Barry Levinson's most successful films after his initial successes with Good Morning, Vietnam and Rain Man. Its success extended to the video rental market and it was the third most rented movie of 1995 in the United States.

== Critical reception ==
Critical response was mixed, with some lauding the film's take on sexual harassment and others critiquing its plot, character development and implausibility. Mick LaSalle of the San Francisco Chronicle praised the film and said Douglas makes for "a complex and sympathetic Everyman", adding, "along the way it paints a picture of corporate America that in itself is a kind of horror story". Ian Nathan of Empire gave it four stars out of five and called it "genuinely gripping", further stating that "Demi Moore makes an awesome femme fatale".

Critic Roger Ebert called the film's theme "basically a launch pad for sex scenes" and further said, "yet the movie is so sleek, so glossy, so filled with Possessoporn (toys so expensive they're erotic), that you can enjoy it like a Sharper Image catalog that walks and talks." He also criticized its convoluted plot, of which he said, "I defy anyone to explain." He added: "As the movie started, I expected a sexy docudrama about sexual harassment. What I got was more of a thriller and whodunit, in which the harassment theme gets misplaced. Too bad, since the best scenes involve the attorneys for Moore and Douglas, and especially the scenes where Douglas' attorney sets out in chilling detail what a lawsuit is likely to do to his life. There's also an intriguing subplot involving Douglas' relationship with his wife (Caroline Goodall). Much could have been made of this material. Much has been made of it. But not the same much."

Marjorie Baumgarten of The Austin Chronicle observed: "In its rush to push hot buttons, Disclosure neglected some essentials of good storytelling." The New York Times critic Janet Maslin wrote much of the film "is talky and uneventful, with legal maneuverings and corporate strategies substituting for more energetic drama". Maslin concluded, "The storytelling of Disclosure is too forced and polemical to be on a par with better Crichton tales like Jurassic Park. This time, it's the author who's the dinosaur."

Some critics described the characters as flat and lacking dimension. The Washington Post's Desson Thomson felt that the script left out key sections of the novel. Others noted Meredith's motives went unexplored, with some opining Moore is stuck playing a thankless femme fatale role. The Los Angeles Times' Kenneth Turan said while the film is "adequately entertaining", it lacks a "creative passion." He added "screenwriter Attanasio, who dealt thoughtfully with ethical dilemmas in Quiz Show, works in a more limited moral palette in Disclosure, where questions of who is right and who is wrong are plainly obvious. The idea that sexual harassment is about power, not sex, and that a woman in power can potentially misbehave just like a man may be news to certain segments of the population, but they are not news enough to light a much-needed fire under this production." The climactic virtual reality scene has since been singled out for its datedness and "silliness".

Critics claimed that the movie was about the male cultural fear of feminism and powerful women in the workplace. Some critics expressed their disappointment that though the film purported to be about sexual harassment, the topic is merely used as a plot device as part of a broader corporate thriller story. In the Chicago Tribune, Michael Wilmington wrote: "there's a fairy tale quality about Crichton's resolution. Supposedly Disclosure is about sexual harassment as a universal problem. But, on a deeper level, it's probably about the fear of men in the modern corporate world that women have them at a disadvantage. It suggests that a really evil, conscienceless-and sexy-woman can manipulate that changed climate to destroy a decent but non-political man (because she'll be believed when he won't)."

The supporting cast, particularly Roma Maffia and Donald Sutherland, received positive reviews. Commendation was also given to the film's production design, particularly the DigiCom offices.

The film has an approval rating of 59% on Rotten Tomatoes based on 63 reviews. The site's consensus states: "While entertaining and fitfully provocative, Disclosure ultimately trades narrative depth for glossy cynicism and superficial treatment of its serious themes." Metacritic, which uses a weighted average, assigned the film a score of 58 out of 100, based on 19 critics, indicating "mixed or average" reviews.

=== Year-end lists ===
- Honorable mention – Jeff Simon, The Buffalo News
- Dishonorable mention – Dan Craft, The Pantagraph

== In popular culture ==
The adult animated sitcom Big Mouth parodied the film in "Disclosure the Movie: The Musical!" (season 3 episode 10), featuring a raunchy stage musical adaptation starring pre-teen students.

== See also ==
- Aitraaz, Bollywood remake of Disclosure
- Inkaar (2013), a Hindi film with a similar plot
- Indira Vizha, a Tamil film adaptation
