= Passion of Mind =

- Theatrical release poster
- Directed by: Alain Berliner
- Written by: Ron Bass; David Field
- Produced by: Carole Scotta; Tom Rosenberg; Ron Bass
- Starring: Demi Moore; Stellan Skarsgård; William Fichtner; Peter Riegert; Sinéad Cusack
- Cinematography: Eduardo Serra
- Edited by: Anne V. Coates
- Music by: Randy Edelman
- Production company: Lakeshore Entertainment
- Distributed by: Paramount Classics
- Release date: May 26, 2000
- Running time: 105 minutes
- Country: United States
- Languages: English; French
- Budget: $12 million
- Box office: $769,272

Passion of Mind is a 2000 American drama film directed by Alain Berliner and written by Ron Bass and David Field. The first English-language film by Berliner, it stars Demi Moore, Stellan Skarsgård, William Fichtner, Peter Riegert, and Sinéad Cusack. It received negative reviews from critics and became a box-office bomb, grossing just $769,272 against its $12 million budget, whilst Moore received a nomination for the Golden Raspberry Award for Worst Actress.

Coralie Fargeat, the film's second second assistant director who was tasked with jobs such as bringing Moore coffee each morning, later became a filmmaker in her own right and convinced Moore to star in her critically acclaimed horror film The Substance (2024).

== Plot ==
Marty is a single, high-powered literary agent in Manhattan. Marie is a widow who lives a peaceful life in Provence, France with her two daughters. When Marie falls asleep she dreams that she is Marty and when Marty falls asleep she dreams that she is Marie. Marty has been seeing a therapist to deal with her vivid dreams of Marie's life. Marie also sees a therapist, and confides in her older friend, Jessie, but she is much less disturbed by the dream life.

Marty's New York psychiatrist, Dr. Peters, feels that she is lonely in her busy life and wants to live a simple life with children to love. Marie's French psychiatrist, Dr. Langer, feels that she wants more than a drab home life and longs to lead a more exciting one.

Through a business deal, Marty meets Aaron, an accountant. They become friends and eventually lovers. Terrified that her vivid other life means that she's losing her mind, Marty doesn't want to tell Aaron about it but finally does. Marie, meanwhile, has met and fallen in love with William, a writer. She too is reluctant to tell William about her dreams, particularly because she (as Marty) is falling in love with Aaron, but realizes that she cannot keep such an important part of her life a secret.

The two men react very differently: William is jealous, and Aaron is skeptical but not at all threatened, and wants only for Marty to be happy. Dreams and reality begin to merge when Marie goes on holiday with William to Paris, and Marty wakes up with an ashtray from the hotel on her night stand. Eventually Marty/Marie must come to terms with reality and choose which life is real and which is illusion.

Along the way, Marty and Marie find clues from each other's lives in each world. Yet, the real, tangible things are always found in the New York world. Eventually, she realizes that her New York Life is real and her French life is a dream. Marie's two daughters are herself when she was 7 and 11. Her friend, Jessie, is her memory of her mother who died when she was eleven.

Marty gives Aaron her journals as a way to understand her better.

== Cast ==
- Demi Moore as Martha Marie / 'Marty' Talridge
- Julianne Nicholson as Kim
- William Fichtner as Aaron Reilly
- Sinéad Cusack as Jessie
- Joss Ackland as Dr. Langer, the French psychiatrist
- Peter Riegert as Dr. Peters, the New York psychiatrist
- Stellan Skarsgård as William Granther
- Eloise Eonnet as Jennifer 'Jenny' Talridge
- Gerry Bamman as Edward 'Ed' Youngerman

== Reception ==
Passion of Mind garnered negative reviews from critics. Review aggregator Rotten Tomatoes gave it a 20% approval rating, based on 35 reviews, with an average score of 4/10. On Metacritic, the film has a weighted average score of 28 out of 100, based on 27 critics, indicating "generally unfavorable reviews".

Emanuel Levy, writing for Variety, criticized Bass and Field's "narrowly-scoped, undernourished script" for taking its main concept and explained it in "a more rational and clinical way", but praised Berliner and his production crew for constructing "workable tension" during the first half with "impressive mise-en-scene" and "smooth transitions" between the two different lives and the performances of Moore, Skarsgård and Fichtner, concluding that: "Due to them, "Passion of Mind" is more successful and enjoyable as a variation on the prevalent screen theme of romantic triangle than as a psychological case of split personality." Marjorie Baumgarten of The Austin Chronicle was also critical of the "woefully underwritten" script telling "a preposterous story" with an unearned "explanatory climax", but gave praise to Moore, Skarsgård and Fichtner, saying they "perform ably and strike more than a few pleasant moments in this otherwise forgettable drama." Roger Ebert felt the screenplay paled in comparison to the similarly premised Me Myself I when constructing its story with supernatural and multiple personality elements, saying it gave unanswered questions that overshadow the content and leads to an "unconvincingly neat" conclusion. Entertainment Weekly's Lisa Schwarzbaum gave the film a "D+" grade, calling it "a weirdly rococo and psychologically nonsensical application" of the "folks surfing the space-time/living-dead continuum" formula that was previously used by Frequency, Me Myself I and Sliding Doors.

Moore was nominated for a Golden Raspberry Award for Worst Actress for her roles, but lost to Madonna for The Next Best Thing.

Positive reviews focus on the theme of psychological healing after childhood trauma.
