= Blame It on Rio =

1984 film by Stanley Donen

- Theatrical release poster
- Directed by: Stanley Donen
- Screenplay by: Charlie Peters; Larry Gelbart
- Based on: Un moment d'égarement by Claude Berri
- Produced by: Stanley Donen
- Starring: Michael Caine; Joseph Bologna; Valerie Harper; Michelle Johnson; Demi Moore
- Cinematography: Reynaldo Villalobos
- Edited by: George Hively; Richard Marden
- Music by: Kenneth Wannberg
- Production company: Sherwood Productions
- Distributed by: 20th Century-Fox
- Release date: February 17, 1984
- Running time: 100 minutes
- Country: United States
- Language: English
- Box office: $18.6 million

Blame It on Rio is a 1984 American romantic comedy film produced and directed by Stanley Donen from a screenplay by Charlie Peters and Larry Gelbart, based on the 1977 French film Un moment d'égarement, remade in 2015 with its title in English as One Wild Moment. The film stars an ensemble cast, including Michael Caine, Joseph Bologna, Valerie Harper, Michelle Johnson, and Demi Moore.

== Plot ==
Businessmen Matthew Hollis and Victor Lyons are best friends and colleagues who work in São Paulo and are preparing to go on a vacation to Rio de Janeiro with their respective teenage daughters, Nikki and Jennifer, and Matthew's wife Karen. Victor is going through a divorce, while Matthew's marriage has become strained. At the last minute, Karen announces she is going to Bahia by herself instead. Matthew and Victor ultimately arrive in Rio with their daughters, settling into a rented house. Jennifer and Nikki share a room, where Jennifer confesses that she used to have a crush on Matthew.

On the beach, as they walk by numerous topless young women, Matthew and Victor are embarrassed to find that their daughters are topless as well. That night, after dropping the girls off at a beach wedding, the men visit a bar. While Victor flirts with a woman named Isabella, Matthew returns to the wedding, where he encounters Jennifer. When the wedding attendees remove their clothes and take a dip in the ocean, Jennifer persuades Matthew to join them as she takes off her top. While in the water, Jennifer kisses Matthew, which Nikki witnesses, and the two proceed to have sex on the beach.

The next morning, Matthew insists that what happened the previous night can never happen again, but Jennifer continues to flirt with him in various inappropriate situations. At one point, while Victor and Nikki are having breakfast in the garden, Jennifer kisses Matthew while he is shaving, transferring some shaving cream to her cheek. At another point, she touches his leg from under the table while having dinner, and the two eventually have sex again. When Jennifer asks Nikki if she hates her, Nikki responds that she hates Matthew instead.

Jennifer tearfully admits to Victor that she had an affair with an older married man, whom she refuses to identify. Victor becomes furious and sets out to hunt down the mystery man, enlisting Matthew's help. Matthew tries to talk Jennifer into ending their affair, but she refuses to give up on him. She takes a nude photo of herself and gives it to Matthew in public while riding the Sugarloaf Cable Car. Matthew ultimately discloses to his friend that Jennifer had the affair with him. Victor is not as upset as Matthew expected because Victor is revealed to have been having an affair with Karen, who arrives at the urging of Nikki.

Jennifer is hospitalized after attempting suicide with an overdose of birth control pills, but survives. Back at the house, Karen and Nikki both refuse to speak to Matthew, forcing him to share a room with Victor, but the men fight over each other's sexual misconduct. The next morning, Jennifer returns from the hospital with Lorenzo, a young male nurse she met while recuperating. Victor allows Jennifer to stay at the house for another week with Nikki and Lorenzo after the parents leave. Karen ends her affair with Victor and invites Matthew to join her in Bahia to work on their marital problems. One year later, Victor finalizes his divorce but ends up remarrying his wife.

== Cast ==
- Michael Caine as Matthew Hollis
- Joseph Bologna as Victor Lyons
- Valerie Harper as Karen Hollis
- Michelle Johnson as Jennifer Lyons
- Demi Moore as Nicole "Nikki" Hollis
- José Lewgoy as Eduardo Marques
- Lupe Gigliotti as Signora Botega
- Betty Von Wien as Isabella
- Nelson Dantas as doctor
- Thomas Lee Mahon as Lorenzo

== Production ==
The film was shot on location in Rio de Janeiro.

== Reception ==
Vincent Canby of The New York Times, reviewing Blame It on Rio, wrote "there's not a single funny or surprising moment in the movie. However, Blame It on Rio is not simply humorless. It also spreads gloom. It's one of those unfortunate projects that somehow suggests that everyone connected with the movie hated it and all of the other people involved." Hugh Lamberton of The Canberra Times described Blame It on Rio as "one of the worst movies ever made and definitely the most banal piece of rubbish to have Michael Caine's name on the credits—and he has quite a few bombs to his credit." Roger Ebert gave the film one out of four stars, writing: "It's really unsettling to see how casually this movie takes a serious situation. A disturbed girl is using sex to play mind games with a middle-aged man, and the movie get its yuks with slapstick scenes...What's shocking is how many first-rate talents are associated with this sleaze."

Chris Chase of The New York Times cited Blame It on Rio as part of a new wave of films addressing the topic of teenage sexuality, alongside Angel, Risky Business, and Reckless.

On the review aggregator website Rotten Tomatoes, the film holds an approval rating of 11% based on 28 reviews. The website's critics consensus reads, "It isn't clear who is most culpable for this creepy comedy's sheer wrongness, but its smarmy laughs and uncomfortable romance will leave audiences feeling guilty long afterward."

Michelle Johnson was nominated for the Golden Raspberry Award for Worst New Star at the 5th Golden Raspberry Awards, losing to Olivia d'Abo for Bolero and Conan the Destroyer.
