= No Small Affair =

1984 film by Jerry Schatzberg

- Theatrical release poster
- Directed by: Jerry Schatzberg
- Screenplay by: Craig Bolotin (as Charles Bolt); Terence Mulcahy
- Story by: Craig Bolotin (as Charles Bolt)
- Produced by: William Sackheim
- Starring: Jon Cryer; Demi Moore
- Cinematography: Vilmos Zsigmond
- Edited by: Priscilla Nedd; Eve Newman; Melvin Shapiro
- Music by: Rupert Holmes
- Distributed by: Columbia Pictures
- Release date: November 9, 1984
- Running time: 102 minutes
- Country: United States
- Language: English
- Budget: $8.5 million
- Box office: $4,994,094

No Small Affair is a 1984 American comedy-drama film directed by Jerry Schatzberg and starring Jon Cryer and Demi Moore. Cryer, Jennifer Tilly, Tim Robbins and Tate Donovan make their film debuts.

== Plot ==
The 16-year-old amateur photographer Charles (Jon Cryer) accidentally takes a photo of Laura (Demi Moore) while shooting at a pier and falls in love with her when he develops the photo.

He loiters around the area, looking for her, even checks with local police with no luck. When his big brother Leonard comes to town with his fiancée, they sneak Charles into a bar where Laura is singing. The bouncer tries to drag him out, then the cops finish the job, but our hero hardly cares, as he has learned the name of his beloved.

When the lead guitarist of Laura's band quits, her job is imperiled. Although rejected at first by the 22-year-old, Charles offers to photograph her. That night, he convinces his brother and friends to move the stag night to her bar.

Even though Charles had increased the numbers that night, Laura's band was still cut, so she let him do a shoot. Afterwards, they dress up to sneak into a wedding reception. Caught by the father of the bride, Charles convinces him to let Laura literally sing for their supper.

Using the publicity photos he took, and all of his savings, Charles attempts to boost her performing career by starting an ad campaign without her knowing on the city's taxis — with unexpected results.

Added to the taxi ads was a short article that goes national, explaining the ad and their story. Laura has a huge gig, and a major record label picks her up. Before she moves to L.A., Charles stops by her place, spends the night and loses his virginity.

== Cast ==
- Jon Cryer as Charles Cummings
- Demi Moore as Laura Victor
  - Chrissy Faith – singing voice of Laura
- George Wendt as Jake
- Peter Frechette as Leonard Cummings
- E. G. Daily as Susan
- Ann Wedgeworth as Joan Cummings
- Jeffrey Tambor as Ken
- Tim Robbins as Nelson
- Hamilton Camp as Gus Sosnowski
- Scott Getlin as Scott
- Judith Baldwin as Stephanie
- Jennifer Tilly as Mona
- Kene Holliday as Walt Cronin
- Thomas Adams as The Waiter
- Myles Berkowitz as John
- Tate Donovan as Bob
- Arthur Taxier as The Bouncer

== Production ==
No Small Affair originally went into production in 1981, under director Martin Ritt, and planned to star Matthew Broderick and Sally Field in the lead roles. Production was shut down two weeks in as Ritt suffered health problems. Mark Rydell was considered as a possible replacement for Ritt, but the production was scrapped. Producer William Sackheim remained committed to the project and screenwriters Michael Leeson and Terence Mulcahy were brought on to do rewrites (with Mulcahy getting credit on the screenplay with Craig Bolotin).

In 1984, the film was restarted with director Jerry Schatzberg and the lead roles were re-cast with Jon Cryer and Ellen Barkin. After a rehearsal, Barkin was replaced by Demi Moore.

== Box office ==
No Small Affair grossed a little over $4.9 million against an $8.5 million budget, which made the film a box office failure.

== Critical reception ==
No Small Affair received a mixed critical response. The film holds a 57% rating on Rotten Tomatoes based on seven reviews. The Christian Science Monitor's David Sterritt wrote "Jerry Schatzberg . . . who worked with still pictures before moving to cinema . . . cares more about capturing the visual charms of San Francisco than smoothly unfolding the happy-sad story. The result is friendly but bland".
