= 1993 Stinkers Bad Movie Awards =

Award ceremony presented by the Stinkers Bad Movie Awards in 1993

16th Stinkers Bad Movie Awards
- Date: 1994

Highlights
- Worst Film: Sliver
- Most awards: Sliver (2)
- Most nominations: Cop and a Half (3)

The 16th Stinkers Bad Movie Awards were released by the Hastings Bad Cinema Society in 1994 to honor the worst films the film industry had to offer in 1993. For the first time in Stinkers' history, there were additional categories to be included besides just Worst Picture. Such categories are shown below along with Worst Picture and its dishonorable mentions, which are films that were considered for Worst Picture but ultimately failed to make the final ballot (19 total). All winners are highlighted.

== Winners and Nominees ==
=== Worst Picture ===
Film	Production company(s)
Sliver	Paramount Pictures
Boxing Helena	MGM, United Artists, Orion Pictures
Cop and a Half	Universal Pictures
Last Action Hero	Sony
Son of the Pink Panther	MGM, United Artists

==== Dishonorable Mentions ====
- The Beverly Hillbillies (Fox)
- Body of Evidence (MGM/UA)
- Born Yesterday (Hollywood)
- Cliffhanger (Sony)
- Coneheads (Paramount)
- Dazed and Confused (Gramercy)
- Dennis the Menace (Warner Bros.)
- Gettysburg (New Line)
- Indecent Proposal (Paramount)
- Look Who's Talking Now (Sony)
- Made in America (Warner Bros.)
- Poetic Justice (Sony)
- Short Cuts (Fine Line)
- So I Married An Axe Murderer (Sony)
- Super Mario Bros. (Hollywood)
- Teenage Mutant Ninja Turtles 3 (New Line)
- The Temp (Paramount)
- Wayne's World 2 (Paramount)
- Weekend at Bernie's II (Sony)

=== Other Categories ===
Worst Actor: Ted Danson for Made in America as Hal Jackson; Norman D. Golden II for Cop and a Half as Devon Butler; Robert Redford for Indecent Proposal as John Gage; Burt Reynolds for Cop and a Half as Detective Nick McKenna; Arnold Schwarzenegger for Last Action Hero as Jack Slater / Himself	Worst Actress: Sharon Stone for Sliver as Carly Norris; Faye Dunaway for The Temp as Charlene Towne; Whoopi Goldberg for Made in America as Sarah Matthews; Madonna for Body of Evidence as Rebecca Carlson; Demi Moore for Indecent Proposal as Diana Murphy
Worst Sequel: Weekend at Bernie's II (Sony); Look Who's Talking Now (Sony); Wayne's World 2 (Paramount)	The Sequel Nobody Was Clamoring For: Look Who's Talking Now (Sony); Son of the Pink Panther (MGM/UA); Weekend at Bernie's II (Sony)
Worst Resurrection of a TV Show: The Beverly Hillbillies (Fox); The Coneheads (Paramount); Dennis the Menace (Warner Bros.)	Worst Fake Beards: Gettysburg (New Line)
The Founders Award - What Were They Thinking and Why?: Short Cuts (Fine Line)
