= 14th Golden Raspberry Awards =

Award for worst cinematic under-achievements in 1993

- Date: March 20, 1994
- Site: Hollywood Roosevelt Hotel, California

Highlights
- Worst Picture: Indecent Proposal
- Most awards: Indecent Proposal (3)
- Most nominations: Indecent Proposal and Sliver (both 7)

The 14th Golden Raspberry Awards were held on March 20, 1994, at the Hollywood Roosevelt Hotel to recognize the worst the movie industry had to offer in 1993.

== Winners and Nominees ==
Winner (in bold)
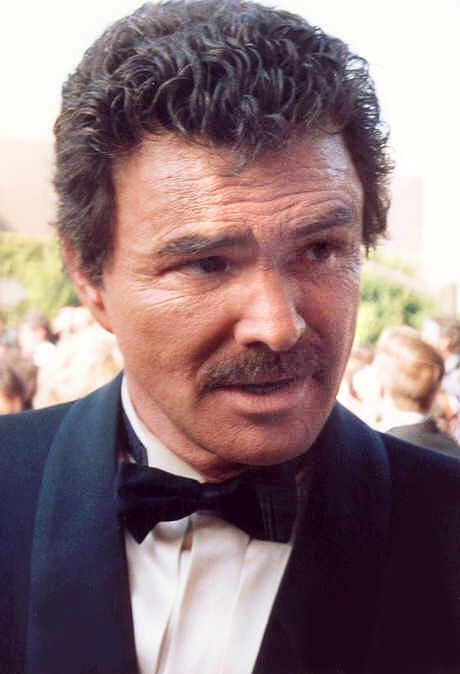
Burt Reynolds, Worst Actor winner.

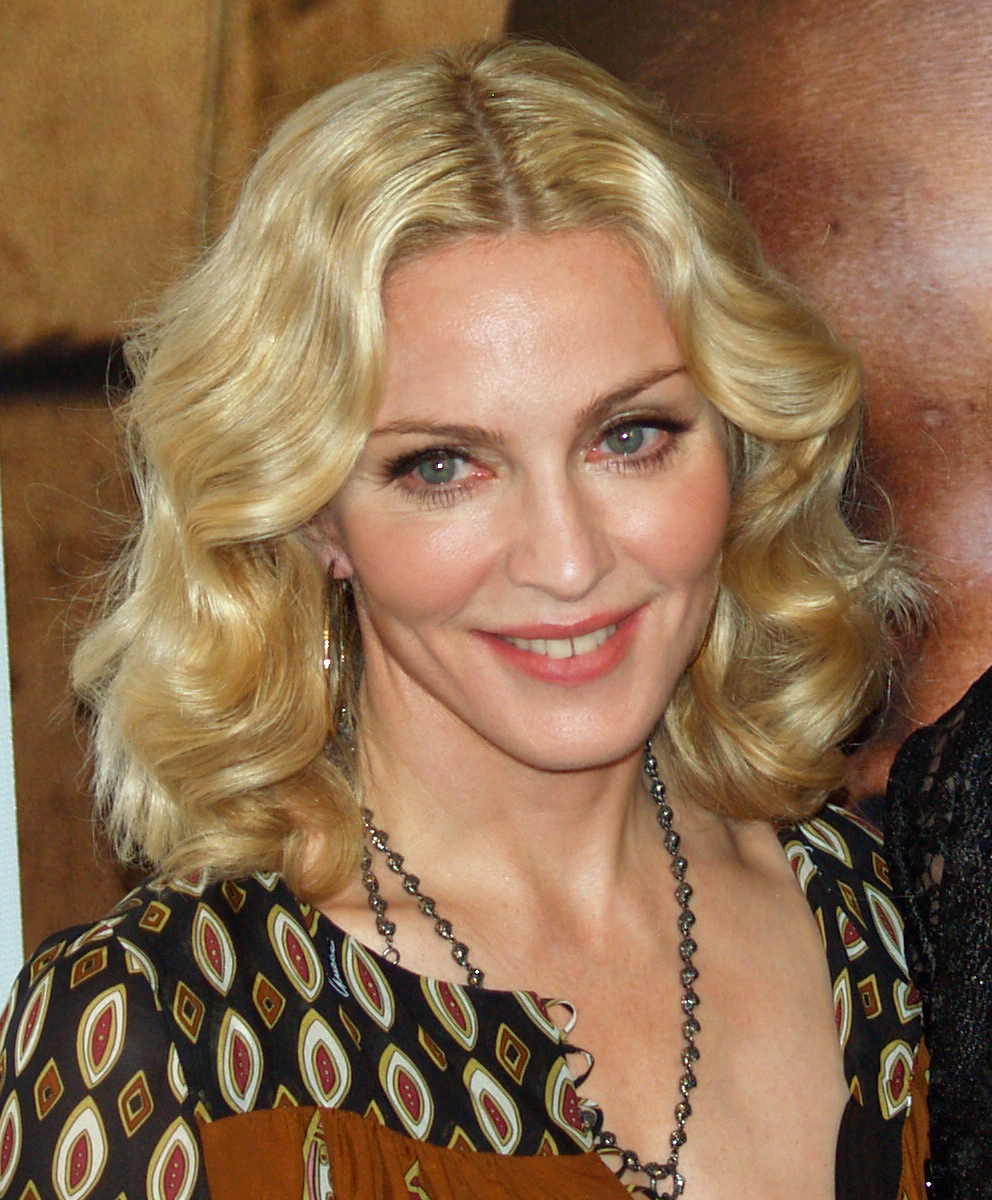
Madonna, Worst Actress winner.

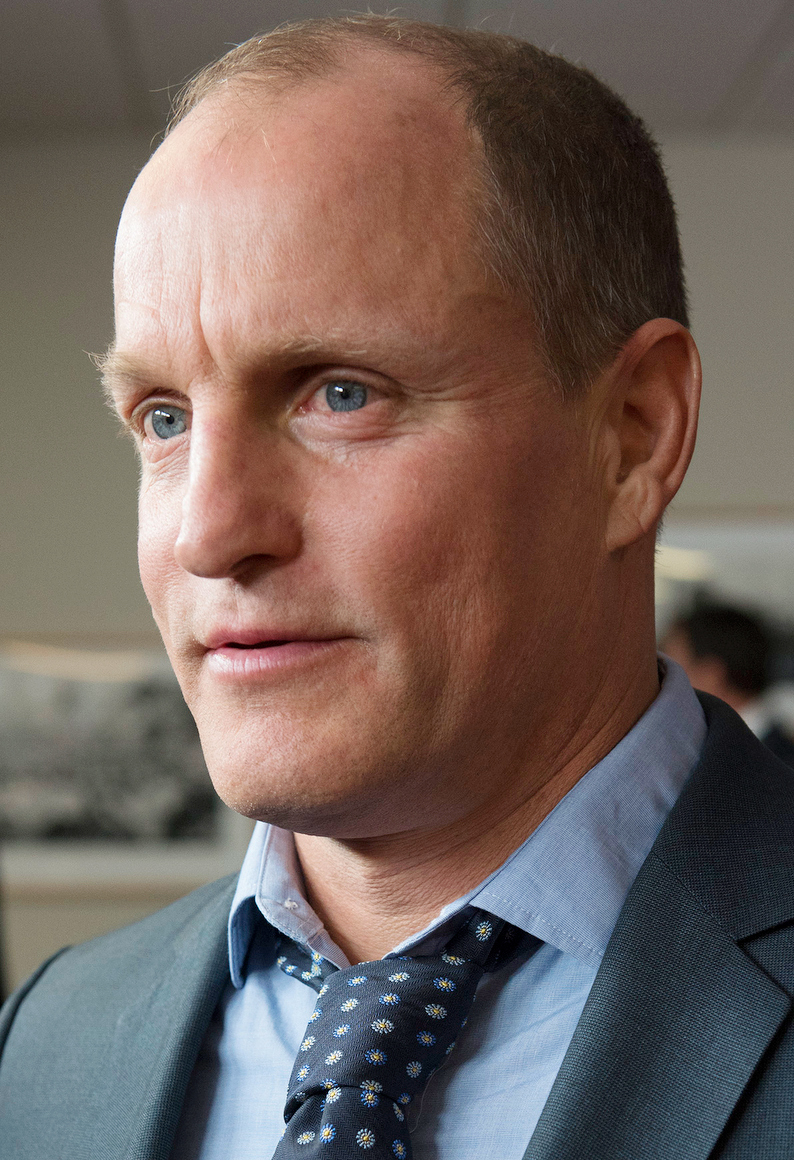
Woody Harrelson, Worst Supporting Actor winner.

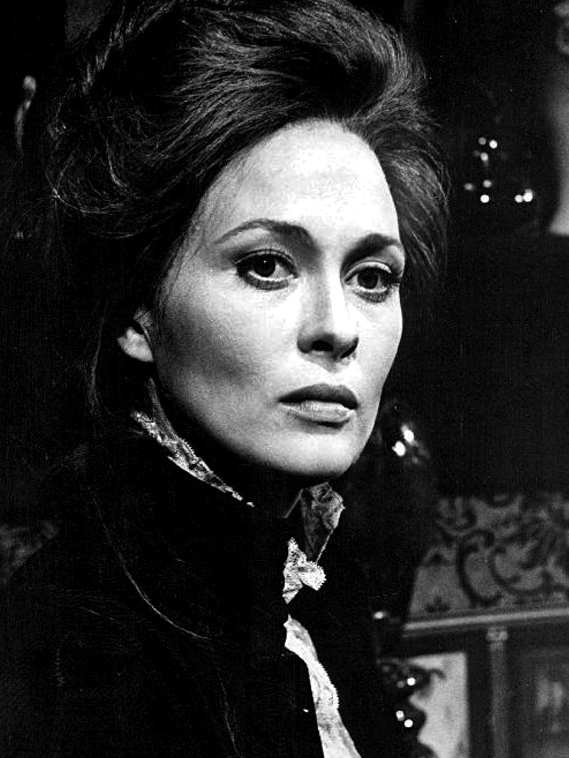
Faye Dunaway, Worst Supporting Actress winner.

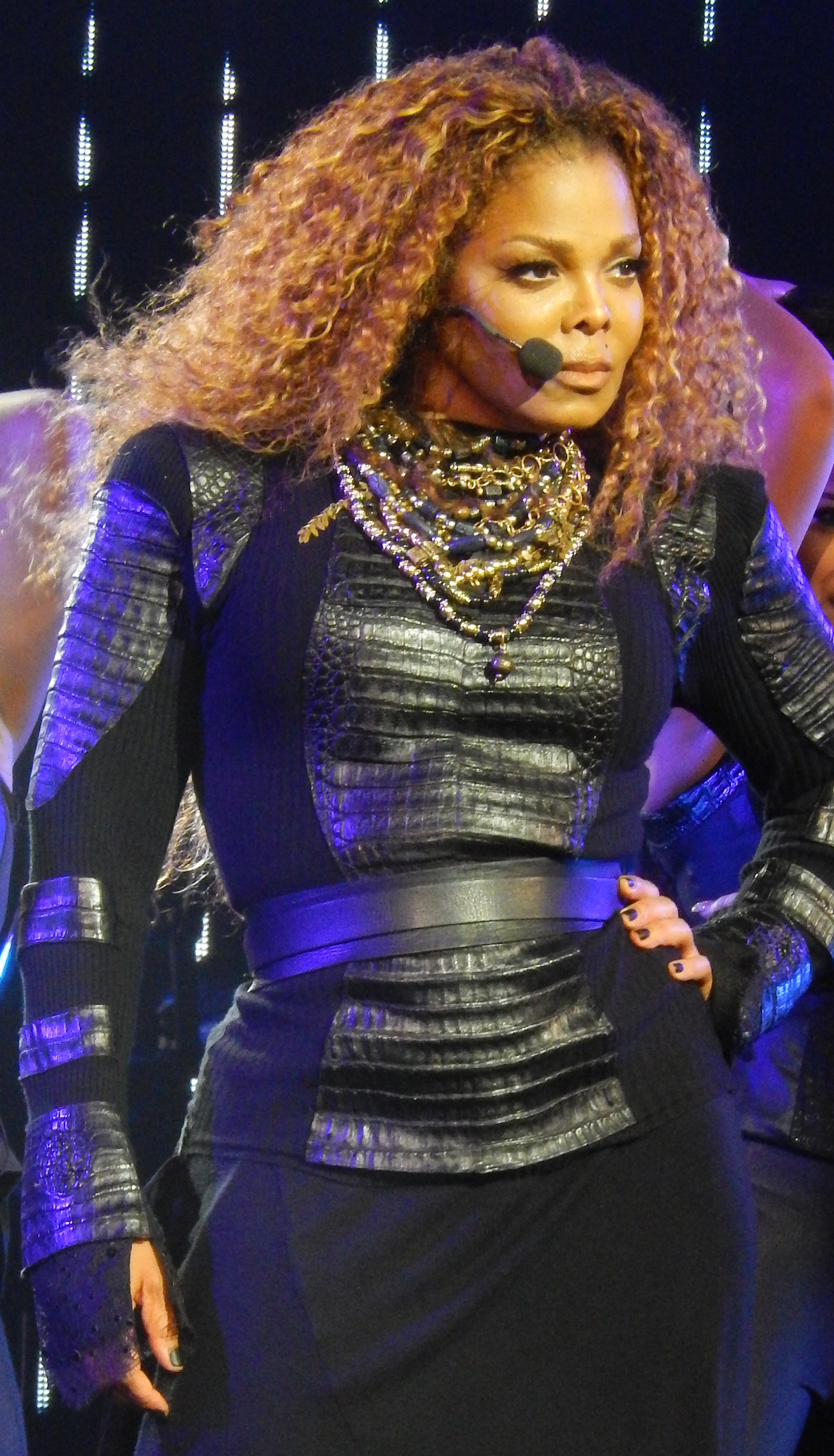
Janet Jackson, Worst New Star winner.

Category	Recipient
Worst Picture	**Indecent Proposal – (Paramount) – Sherry Lansing**
Worst Picture	Body of Evidence – (MGM/UA) – Dino De Laurentiis
Worst Picture	Cliffhanger – (TriStar) – Renny Harlin, Alan Marshall
Worst Picture	Last Action Hero – (Columbia) – John McTiernan
Worst Picture	Sliver – (Paramount) – Robert Evans
Worst Actor	**Burt Reynolds in Cop and a Half as Det. Nick McKenna**
Worst Actor	William Baldwin in Sliver as Zeke Hawkins
Worst Actor	Willem Dafoe in Body of Evidence as Frank Dulaney
Worst Actor	Robert Redford in Indecent Proposal as John Gage
Worst Actor	Arnold Schwarzenegger in Last Action Hero as Jack Slater
Worst Actress	**Madonna in Body of Evidence as Rebecca Carlson**
Worst Actress	Melanie Griffith in Born Yesterday as Emma "Billie" Dawn
Worst Actress	Janet Jackson in Poetic Justice as Justice
Worst Actress	Demi Moore in Indecent Proposal as Diana Murphy
Worst Actress	Sharon Stone in Sliver as Carly Norris
Worst Supporting Actor	**Woody Harrelson in Indecent Proposal as David Murphy**
Worst Supporting Actor	Tom Berenger in Sliver as Jack Landsford
Worst Supporting Actor	John Lithgow in Cliffhanger as Eric Qualen
Worst Supporting Actor	Chris O'Donnell in The Three Musketeers as D'Artagnan
Worst Supporting Actor	Keanu Reeves in Much Ado About Nothing as Don John
Worst Supporting Actress	**Faye Dunaway in The Temp as Charlene Towne**
Worst Supporting Actress	Anne Archer in Body of Evidence as Joanne Braslow
Worst Supporting Actress	Sandra Bullock in Demolition Man as Lt. Lenina Huxley
Worst Supporting Actress	Colleen Camp in Sliver as Judy Marks
Worst Supporting Actress	Janine Turner in Cliffhanger as Jessie Deighan
Worst Director	**Jennifer Lynch for Boxing Helena**
Worst Director	Uli Edel for Body of Evidence
Worst Director	Adrian Lyne for Indecent Proposal
Worst Director	John McTiernan for Last Action Hero
Worst Director	Phillip Noyce for Sliver
Worst Screenplay	**Indecent Proposal, screenplay by Amy Holden Jones, based upon the novel by Jack Engelhard**
Worst Screenplay	Body of Evidence, written by Brad Mirman
Worst Screenplay	Cliffhanger, screenplay by Michael France and Sylvester Stallone, screen story by France, based on a premise by John Long
Worst Screenplay	Last Action Hero, screenplay by Shane Black & David Arnott, story by Zak Penn & Adam Leff
Worst Screenplay	Sliver, screenplay by Joe Eszterhas, based on the novel by Ira Levin
Worst New Star	**Janet Jackson in Poetic Justice as Justice**
Worst New Star	Roberto Benigni in Son of the Pink Panther as Jacques Gambrelli
Worst New Star	Mason Gamble in Dennis the Menace as Dennis Mitchell
Worst New Star	Norman D. Golden II in Cop and a Half as Devon Butler
Worst New Star	Austin O'Brien in Last Action Hero as Danny Madigan
Worst Original Song	**"Addams Family (Whoomp!)" from Addams Family Values, by Ralph Sall, Steve Gibson, and Cecil Glenn**
Worst Original Song	"Big Gun" from Last Action Hero, written by Angus Young and Malcolm Young
Worst Original Song	"(You Love Me) In All the Right Places" from Indecent Proposal, music by John Barry, lyrics by Lisa Stansfield, Ian Devaney & Andy Morris

== Films with multiple nominations ==
These films received multiple nominations:

Nominations	Films
7	Indecent Proposal
7	Sliver
6	Body of Evidence
6	Last Action Hero
4	Cliffhanger
2	Cop and a Half
2	Poetic Justice

== See also ==
- 1993 in film
- 66th Academy Awards
- 47th British Academy Film Awards
- 51st Golden Globe Awards
