= Indecent Proposal (disambiguation) =

Indecent Proposal is a 1993 American film based on the novel by Jack Engelhard.

Indecent Proposal may also refer to:

- Indecent Proposal (novel), by Jack Engelhard
- Indecent Proposal (album), by Timbaland & Magoo
