= List of 1993 box office number-one films in the United States =

This is a list of films which have placed number one at the weekend box office in the United States during 1993.

== Number-one films ==
| † | This implies the highest-grossing movie of the year. |

| # | Weekend end date | Film | Box office | Notes | Ref |
|---|---|---|---|---|---|
| 1 | January 3, 1993 | Aladdin | $15,642,073 | Aladdin reached No. 1 in its fifth weekend of release. | |
| 2 | January 10, 1993 | A Few Good Men | $9,012,668 | A Few Good Men reclaimed #1 in its fifth weekend of release. | |
| 3 | January 18, 1993^{4-day weekend} | Aladdin | $10,920,346 | Aladdin reclaimed #1 in seventh weekend of release. | |
| 4 | January 24, 1993 | Aladdin | $7,438,690 | | |
| 5 | January 31, 1993 | Aladdin | $6,319,917 | | |
| 6 | February 7, 1993 | Loaded Weapon 1 | $9,202,722 | | |
| 7 | February 15, 1993^{4-day weekend} | Groundhog Day | $14,652,108 | | |
| 8 | February 21, 1993 | Groundhog Day | $9,330,577 | | |
| 9 | February 28, 1993 | Falling Down | $8,724,452 | | |
| 10 | March 7, 1993 | Falling Down | $7,625,100 | | |
| 11 | March 14, 1993 | CB4 | $6,122,450 | | |
| 12 | March 21, 1993 | Teenage Mutant Ninja Turtles III | $12,419,597 | | |
| 13 | March 28, 1993 | Teenage Mutant Ninja Turtles III | $7,405,465 | | |
| 14 | April 4, 1993 | Cop and a Half | $6,027,285 | | |
| 15 | April 11, 1993 | Indecent Proposal | $18,387,632 | Indecent Proposal broke Pet Sematary's record ($12.0 million) for highest weekend debut in April. | |
| 16 | April 18, 1993 | Indecent Proposal | $14,724,600 | | |
| 17 | April 25, 1993 | Indecent Proposal | $10,010,763 | | |
| 18 | May 2, 1993 | Indecent Proposal | $7,089,915 | | |
| 19 | May 9, 1993 | Dragon: The Bruce Lee Story | $10,019,970 | | |
| 20 | May 16, 1993 | Dave | $8,506,834 | Dave reached No. 1 in its second weekend of release. | |
| 21 | May 23, 1993 | Sliver | $12,138,283 | | |
| 22 | May 31, 1993^{4-day weekend} | Cliffhanger | $20,458,022 | | |
| 23 | June 6, 1993 | Cliffhanger | $12,152,400 | | |
| 24 | June 13, 1993 | Jurassic Park † | $47,026,828 | Jurassic Park broke Batman Returns' records ($45.6 million) for the highest weekend debut for the month of June, for a summer release, a PG-13 rated film, and of all-time. It had the highest weekend debut of 1993. | |
| 25 | June 20, 1993 | Jurassic Park † | $38,455,860 | Jurassic Park broke Batman's record ($30 million) for the highest second weekend gross of all time. | |
| 26 | June 27, 1993 | Jurassic Park † | $27,690,520 | | |
| 27 | July 5, 1993^{4-day weekend} | The Firm | $32,476,785 | | |
| 28 | July 11, 1993 | The Firm | $17,937,098 | | |
| 29 | July 18, 1993 | The Firm | $13,281,416 | | |
| 30 | July 25, 1993 | Poetic Justice | $11,728,455 | | |
| 31 | August 1, 1993 | Rising Sun | $15,195,941 | | |
| 32 | August 8, 1993 | The Fugitive | $23,758,855 | The Fugitive broke Unforgiven's record ($15 million) for the highest weekend debut in the month of August and Star Trek VI: The Undiscovered Country's record ($18.1 million) for the highest weekend debut for a film based on a television show. It stayed at number 1 for 6 weeks, the most in 1993. | |
| 33 | August 15, 1993 | The Fugitive | $22,438,277 | | |
| 34 | August 22, 1993 | The Fugitive | $18,148,331 | | |
| 35 | August 29, 1993 | The Fugitive | $14,502,865 | | |
| 36 | September 6, 1993^{4-day weekend} | The Fugitive | $17,239,413 | | |
| 37 | September 12, 1993 | The Fugitive | $8,316,440 | | |
| 38 | September 19, 1993 | Striking Distance | $8,705,808 | | |
| 39 | September 26, 1993 | The Good Son | $12,520,305 | | |
| 40 | October 3, 1993 | Malice | $9,232,650 | | |
| 41 | October 11, 1993^{4-day weekend} | Demolition Man | $15,973,850 | | |
| 42 | October 17, 1993 | Demolition Man | $10,284,335 | | |
| 43 | October 24, 1993 | The Beverly Hillbillies | $7,178,556 | The Beverly Hillbilles reached No. 1 in its second weekend of release. | |
| 44 | October 31, 1993 | The Nightmare Before Christmas | $8,212,477 | | |
| 45 | November 7, 1993 | The Nightmare Before Christmas | $7,684,284 | | |
| 46 | November 14, 1993 | The Three Musketeers | $10,621,992 | | |
| 47 | November 21, 1993 | Addams Family Values | $14,117,545 | | |
| 48 | November 28, 1993 | Mrs. Doubtfire | $20,468,847 | | |
| 49 | December 5, 1993 | Mrs. Doubtfire | $14,735,459 | | |
| 50 | December 12, 1993 | Wayne's World 2 | $13,516,699 | | |
| 51 | December 19, 1993 | The Pelican Brief | $16,864,404 | | |
| 52 | December 26, 1993 | The Pelican Brief | $11,124,936 | | |
| 53 | January 2, 1994 | Mrs. Doubtfire | $16,346,568 | Mrs. Doubtfire reclaimed #1 in its sixth weekend of release. | |

== Highest-grossing films ==
=== Calendar gross ===
Highest-grossing films of 1993 by Calendar Gross

| Rank | Title | Studio(s) | Actor(s) | Director(s) | Gross |
|---|---|---|---|---|---|
| 1. | Jurassic Park | Universal Pictures | Sam Neill, Laura Dern, Jeff Goldblum, Richard Attenborough, Bob Peck, Martin Ferrero, BD Wong, Samuel L. Jackson, Wayne Knight, Joseph Mazzello and Ariana Richards | Steven Spielberg | $338,929,640 |
| 2. | The Fugitive | Warner Bros. Pictures | Harrison Ford, Tommy Lee Jones, Sela Ward, Joe Pantoliano, Andreas Katsulas, Julianne Moore and Jeroen Krabbé | Andrew Davis | $179,290,645 |
| 3. | The Firm | Paramount Pictures | Tom Cruise, Gene Hackman, Jeanne Tripplehorn, Ed Harris, Holly Hunter, Hal Holbrook, David Strathairn, Wilford Brimley and Gary Busey | Sydney Pollack | $158,348,367 |
| 4. | Sleepless in Seattle | TriStar Pictures | Tom Hanks, Meg Ryan, Bill Pullman, Ross Malinger, Rosie O'Donnell, Rita Wilson and Rob Reiner | Nora Ephron | $126,680,884 |
| 5. | Aladdin | Walt Disney Studios | voices of Scott Weinger, Robin Williams, Linda Larkin, Jonathan Freeman, Frank Welker, Gilbert Gottfried and Douglas Seale | Ron Clements and John Musker | $118,899,051 |
| 6. | Mrs. Doubtfire | 20th Century Fox | Robin Williams, Sally Field, Pierce Brosnan, Harvey Fierstein, Polly Holliday, Lisa Jakub, Matthew Lawrence, Mara Wilson and Robert Prosky | Chris Columbus | $109,086,478 |
| 7. | Indecent Proposal | Paramount Pictures | Robert Redford, Demi Moore, Woody Harrelson, Oliver Platt and Seymour Cassel | Adrian Lyne | $106,614,059 |
| 8. | In the Line of Fire | Columbia Pictures | Clint Eastwood, John Malkovich, Rene Russo, Dylan McDermott, Gary Cole, Fred Dalton Thompson and John Mahoney | Wolfgang Petersen | $102,314,823 |
| 9. | Cliffhanger | TriStar Pictures | Sylvester Stallone, John Lithgow, Michael Rooker, Janine Turner, Leon, Paul Winfield and Ralph Waite | Renny Harlin | $84,049,211 |
| 10. | A Few Good Men | Columbia Pictures | Tom Cruise, Jack Nicholson, Demi Moore, Kevin Bacon, Kevin Pollak, James Marshall, J. T. Walsh and Kiefer Sutherland | Rob Reiner | $78,211,341 |

=== In-year release ===
Highest-grossing films of 1993 by In-year release
| Rank | Title | Distributor | Domestic gross |
|---|---|---|---|
| 1. | Jurassic Park | Universal | $357,067,947 |
| 2. | Mrs. Doubtfire | 20th Century Fox | $219,195,243 |
| 3. | The Fugitive | Warner Bros. | $183,875,760 |
| 4. | The Firm | Paramount | $158,348,367 |
| 5. | Sleepless in Seattle | TriStar | $126,680,884 |
| 6. | Indecent Proposal | Paramount | $106,614,059 |
| 7. | In the Line of Fire | Columbia | $102,314,823 |
| 8. | The Pelican Brief | Warner Bros. | $100,768,056 |
| 9. | Schindler's List | Universal | $96,065,768 |
| 10. | Cliffhanger | TriStar | $84,049,211 |

Highest-grossing films by MPAA rating of 1993
| G | Homeward Bound: The Incredible Journey |
| PG | Sleepless in Seattle |
| PG-13 | Jurassic Park |
| R | The Firm |

== See also ==
- List of American films — American films by year
- Lists of box office number-one films

== Chronology ==
| Preceded by 1992 | 1993 | Succeeded by 1994 |
