= Michael Tadross =

American film producer

- Born: Brooklyn, New York City, U.S.
- Education: Wagner College (BA)
- Occupations: Film producer; executive producer

Michael Tadross is an American film producer and former executive at Paramount Pictures. Films that he either produced or was executive producer include Indecent Proposal, Die Hard with a Vengeance, which became the highest-grossing film of 1995, Eraser, The Devil's Advocate, The Thomas Crown Affair, I Am Legend, Sherlock Holmes and Gangster Squad.

As Executive Vice President of Production at Paramount Pictures, he was in charge of production of films such as Forrest Gump, The Firm, Beverly Hills Cop III, among others.

== Biography ==
Michael Tadross was born in Brooklyn, New York. He graduated with a B.A. from Wagner College and received the Wagner College Distinguished Graduate Award. He was awarded an Honorary Doctorate of Fine Arts from Long Island University in 2018.

He began his film career as a camera trainee and assistant film editor. Tadross is a member of the Producers Guild of America, the Directors Guild of America, and the Academy of Motion Pictures Arts & Sciences.

Tadross also served as Executive Vice President in charge of production at Paramount Pictures from 1991 to 1994 where he oversaw the production of blockbusters such as Forrest Gump, The Firm, Clear and Present Danger, Wayne's World, Searching for Bobby Fischer, Beverly Hills Cop III, Addams Family Values, Coneheads, Flesh and Bone, The Thing Called Love, and Sliver.

== Filmography ==
He was producer for all films unless otherwise noted.

=== Film ===
Year	Film	Credit
1987	Deadly Illusion	Associate producer
1989	Brenda Starr	Associate producer
1992	School Ties	Associate producer
1993	Indecent Proposal	Co-producer
1995	Die Hard with a Vengeance	
1996	Eraser	Executive producer
1997	The Devil's Advocate	Executive producer
1998	Jack Frost	Executive producer
1999	The Thomas Crown Affair	Executive producer
2002	Rollerball	Executive producer
2003	Basic	
2004	Tony n' Tina's Wedding	
2005	Hitch	Executive producer
2007	I Am Legend	Executive producer
2009	Sherlock Holmes	Executive producer
2010	Cop Out	
2011	Arthur	
2013	Gangster Squad	
2014	Winter's Tale	
2015	Run All Night	
2018	Ocean's 8	Executive producer
2021	Boogie	
TBA	Dicey	
TBA	Hollywood by the Sea	
TBA	Newsflash	Executive producer
TBA	Sesame Street	Executive producer

Production manager

Year	Film	Role	Notes
1984	Scream for Help	Assistant production manager: USA	
1985	Death Wish 3	Assistant production manager: USA	
1988	Coming to America	Unit production manager: Los Angeles	
1989	Brenda Starr	Production manager	
1989	Let It Ride	Additional production supervisor	
1989	Black Rain	Unit production manager	
1990	Ghost	Unit production manager	
1992	School Ties	Unit production manager	
1993	The Temp	Executive in charge of production	
1993	Indecent Proposal	Unit production manager	
1993	The Firm	Executive in charge of production	Uncredited
1993	Coneheads	Executive in charge of production	
1993	Searching for Bobby Fischer	Executive in charge of production	Uncredited
1993	The Thing Called Love	Executive in charge of production	
1993	Flesh and Bone	Executive in charge of production	
1993	Addams Family Values	Executive in charge of production	
1993	Wayne's World 2	Executive in charge of production	Uncredited
1994	Blue Chips	Executive in charge of production	
1994	Naked Gun 33 1/3: The Final Insult	Executive in charge of production	Uncredited
1994	Jimmy Hollywood	Executive in charge of production	
1994	Beverly Hills Cop III	Executive in charge of production	
1994	Forrest Gump	Executive in charge of production	Uncredited
1994	Lassie	Executive in charge of production	
1995	Die Hard with a Vengeance	Unit production manager	
1997	The Devil's Advocate	Unit production manager	
2007	I Am Legend	Unit production manager	
2009	Sherlock Holmes	Unit production manager: New York	
2014	Winter's Tale	Unit production manager	

Second unit director or assistant director

Year	Film	Role
1982	One Down, Two to Go	First assistant director
1987	Deadly Illusion	Assistant director
1988	Masquerade	First assistant director
1988	Cocktail	First assistant director: New York

As an actor

Year	Film	Role
1988	Masquerade	Kid on Dock
1988	Coming to America	Taxi Driver
1995	Die Hard with a Vengeance	Greek Deli Proprietor
1997	Too Good to Be True	Drake
2002	Rollerball	Starter

=== Television ===
Year	Title	Notes
1990	When Will I Be Loved?	Television film

Second unit director or assistant director

Year	Title	Role	Notes
1984	The Streets	First assistant director	Television film
1985	John and Yoko: A Love Story	First assistant director	Television film
1986	Intimate Strangers	Assistant director	Television film
1986	Rage of Angels: The Story Continues	First assistant director	Television film
1987	CBS Summer Playhouse	First assistant director	
1988	The Diamond Trap	First assistant director	Television film
