= America's Dream =

1996 American television film

- Official DVD cover
- Genre: Drama
- Based on: "Long Black Song" by Richard Wright; "The Boy Who Painted Christ Black" by John Henrik Clarke; "The Reunion" by Maya Angelou
- Teleplay by: Ron Stacker Thompson; Ashley Tyler
- Directed by: Kevin Rodney Sullivan; Bill Duke; Paris Barclay
- Starring: Danny Glover; Wesley Snipes; Lorraine Toussaint; Tate Donovan; Norman D. Golden II; Susanna Thompson; Jasmine Guy
- Music by: Patrice Rushen
- Country of origin: United States
- Original language: English

Production
- Executive producers: Danny Glover; Carolyn McDonald
- Producer: David Knoller
- Cinematography: Karl Herrmann
- Editors: Monty DeGraff; Angelo Carrao; Michael Schultz
- Running time: 87 minutes
- Production companies: HBO Films; Carrie Productions

Original release
- Network: HBO
- Release: February 17, 1996

America's Dream is a 1996 American made-for-television drama film directed by Kevin Rodney Sullivan, Bill Duke, and Paris Barclay, and written by Ron Stacker Thompson and Ashley Tyler. It is based on the short stories "Long Black Song" by Richard Wright, "The Boy Who Painted Christ Black" by John Henrik Clarke, and "The Reunion" by Maya Angelou. The film stars Danny Glover, Wesley Snipes, Lorraine Toussaint, Tate Donovan, Norman D. Golden II, Susanna Thompson and Jasmine Guy. It premiered on HBO on February 17, 1996.

== Plot ==
A talented young African American student presents his teacher with one of his paintings on her birthday. There are gasps of shock as the painting is revealed to be of Christ on the cross, a Christ who is black. The teacher accepts the painting graciously, and when the end of the year arrives, it is displayed with all the rest of the artwork produced in the school that year. The final ceremony is attended by the white superintendent of the area, who presides happily over proceedings. All is well until he examines the work on display.

== Cast ==
- Danny Glover as Silas
- Wesley Snipes as George Du Vaul
- Lorraine Toussaint as Philomena
- Tate Donovan as David
- Norman D. Golden II as Aaron
- Susanna Thompson as Beth Ann
- Jasmine Guy as Elna Du Vaul
- Tina Lifford as Sarah
- Carl Lumbly as Cal
- Ben Guillory as Willie
- Danny Kamin as Mr. Harper
- RaéVen Kelly as Lara
- Timothy Carhart as Professor Daniel
- Summer Ross Jefferson as Young Philomena #1
- Vanessa Bell Calloway as Miss Williams
- Winter Elaine Jefferson as Young Philomena #2
- Amanda Addison as Young Beth Ann
- Kevin Jamal as Woods Clyde
- Ruth Beckford as Mrs. McClaren
- Yolanda King as Mrs. Crawford

== See also ==
- List of American films of 1996
