= School Ties =

1992 American drama film by Robert Mandel

- Theatrical release poster
- Directed by: Robert Mandel
- Screenplay by: Dick Wolf; Darryl Ponicsan
- Story by: Dick Wolf
- Produced by: Stanley R. Jaffe; Sherry Lansing; Michael Tadross
- Starring: Brendan Fraser
- Cinematography: Freddie Francis
- Edited by: Jerry Greenberg; Jacqueline Cambas
- Music by: Maurice Jarre
- Production company: Jaffe/Lansing Production
- Distributed by: Paramount Pictures
- Release date: September 18, 1992
- Running time: 107 minutes
- Country: United States
- Language: English
- Budget: $18 million
- Box office: $14.7 million

School Ties is a 1992 American drama film directed by Robert Mandel and starring Brendan Fraser, Matt Damon, Chris O'Donnell, Randall Batinkoff, Andrew Lowery, Cole Hauser, Ben Affleck, and Anthony Rapp. Fraser plays the lead role as David Greene, a Jewish high school student who is awarded an athletic scholarship to an elite preparatory school in his senior year.

== Plot ==
In September 1955, working-class 17-year-old David Greene receives a scholarship to exclusive prep school St. Matthew's Academy because of his grades and athletic prowess. Upon arriving at St. Matthew's, he meets roommate Chris Reese and teammates Rip Van Kelt, Charlie Dillon, Jack Connors, and Mack McGivern. All are popular students from well-to-do WASP families. David, who learns of the school's honor code and widespread antisemitism, chooses not to reveal his Jewish identity.

He becomes the football team's hero and attracts débutante Sally Wheeler, whom Charlie claims as his. After the team defeats a rival school, an intoxicated teacher accidentally reveals to Charlie that David is Jewish. Charlie tells the rest of the football team, and David challenges him to a fight, resulting in a bloody nose for Charlie.

Once she learns that David is Jewish, Sally turns against him, as do most other students. His classmates harass him, with only Chris and another unnamed student remaining loyal.

Pressured to get into Harvard, Charlie uses a crib sheet in an exam. David and Rip spot him but say nothing. After the exam, Charlie accidentally drops the cheat sheet, which is found by teacher Mr. Gierasch. Gierasch tells the class he will fail them all if the cheater does not come forward.

David threatens to turn Charlie in if he does not confess. Charlie tells David about the pressure he is facing, apologizes for conspiring against him, and unsuccessfully attempts to buy his silence. Just as David is about to reveal Charlie as the cheater, Charlie publicly accuses David. They try to fight, but Rip tells them to leave and let the rest of the class decide who is being honest. Both agree, although Chris tries to convince David not to on the grounds that the rest of the class will be prejudiced against him. The majority of the class blames David out of antisemitic prejudice; however, Chris, the unnamed student, and Connors (going against his self-professed antisemitism) argue that it is unlike David to cheat and lie. The class votes to convict David, and Van Kelt tells him to report to headmaster Dr. Bartram to confess.

David goes to Bartram's office and says he is the cheater. Unbeknownst to him, Rip had already told Bartram that the offender was Charlie. Bartram tells David and Rip that they should have reported the offense, but he absolves them both. David angrily says that he will use this school as a springboard to further his education the same way that the school uses him for football.

As David leaves the headmaster's office, he sees Charlie—who has been expelled—leaving the school. Charlie tells David that he will be accepted to Harvard despite his expulsion. He adds that years later, everybody will have forgotten about the cheating incident, but that David will still be a "goddamn Jew". David laughs him off, says Charlie will still be a prick, and walks away.

== Cast ==
- Brendan Fraser as David Greene, a standout working-class Jewish student and football quarterback
- Matt Damon as Charlie Dillon, a prefect, football player, and rival to David
- Chris O'Donnell as Chris Reese, a prefect, David's roommate and football teammate
- Andrew Lowery as Mack McGivern
- Randall Batinkoff as Rip Van Kelt, head prefect and football team captain
- Cole Hauser as Jack Connors, a good football player but slacker student
- Amy Locane as Sally Wheeler who attends a neighboring all-girl boarding school and is David and Charlie's love interest
- Peter Donat as Dr. Bartram, headmaster of St. Matthew's
- Željko Ivanek as Mr. Cleary, house master and French teacher
- Kevin Tighe as Coach McDevitt, St. Matthews' head football coach
- Ed Lauter as Alan Greene, David's father
- Michael Higgins as Mr. Gierasch, history teacher
- Anthony Rapp as Richard "McGoo" Collins, the class nerd
- Ben Affleck as Chesty Smith, a football player and McGoo's roommate
- Peter McRobbie as the Chaplain
- John Cunningham as Grayson Dillon, Charlie Dillon's Father

== Filming ==
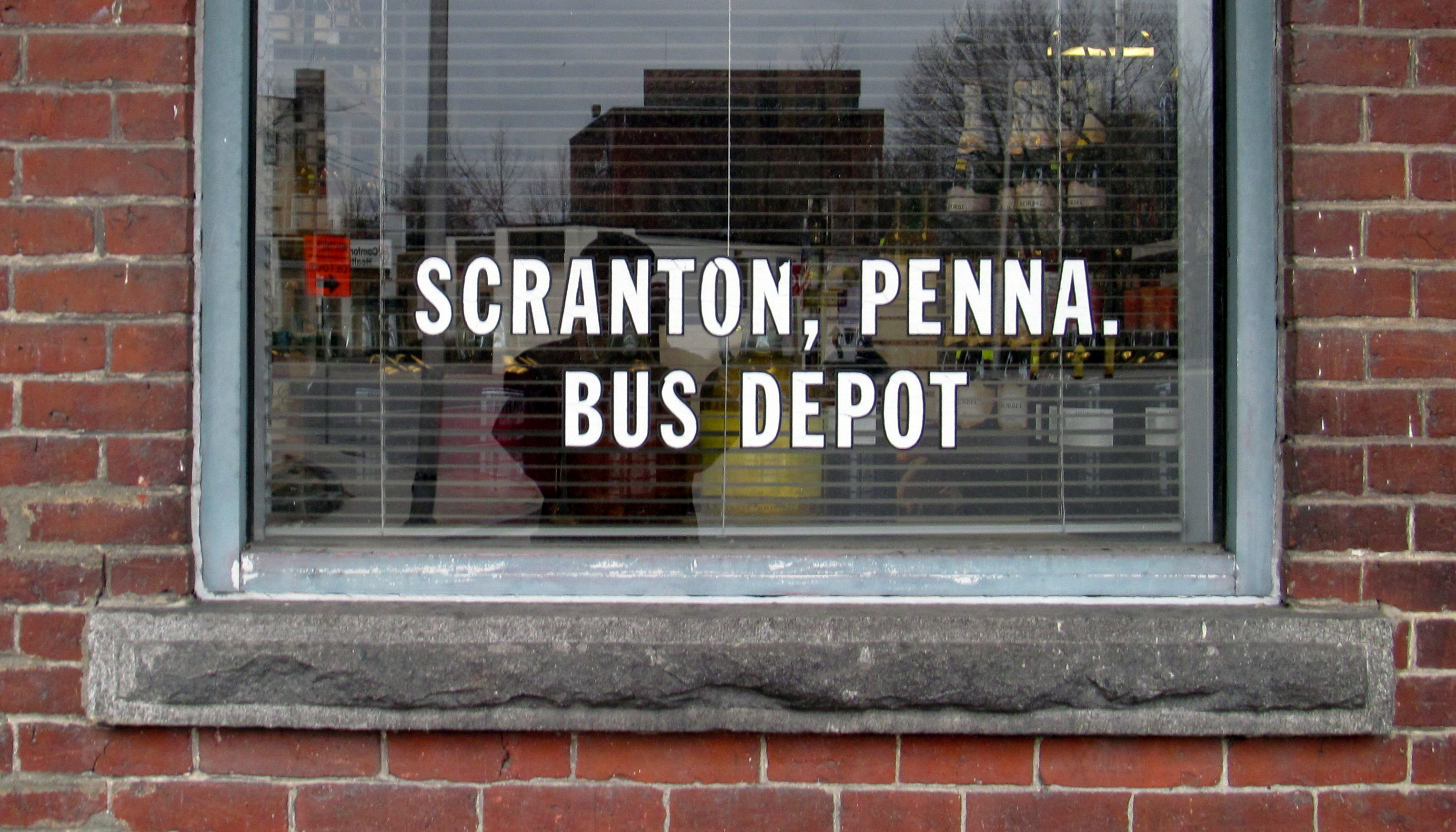
"Scranton, Penna. Bus Depot" decal in the window of a former train station in Leominster (2014), used for filming a scene

Most of the movie was filmed on location at Middlesex School in Concord, Massachusetts. The scene at the bus depot in Scranton, Pennsylvania, was filmed at a liquor store (the former train station) in Leominster, Massachusetts. The scene at Skip's Blue Moon Diner was filmed in downtown Gardner, Massachusetts. In addition, Groton School, Worcester Academy, Lawrence Academy at Groton and St. Mark's School (all area prep schools) were involved in the filming.

Opening scenes are of the Bethlehem Steel Plant shot from the 900 block of E. 4th Street, Zion Lutheran Church from the top of St. Michael's Cemetery looking northwest to 1000 block of E. 4th Street, and a car turning on to Buchanan Street from Atlantic Street in Bethlehem, Pennsylvania. The Mobil Station, Chip's Diner and the Roxy Theatre were filmed on Main Street in Northampton, Pennsylvania. The opening credits scene in front of Danas Luncheonette and some scenes inside were filmed in Lowell, Massachusetts. The middle dinner and dancing scene was filmed at the Lanam Club in Andover, Massachusetts.

== Release ==
=== Box office ===
The film was a commercial failure, only grossing $14.7 million at the box office against a budget of $18 million. Despite this, the film provided some of the first major cinema lead roles for many of its cast, including Fraser, Affleck, Hauser and Damon.

=== Critical reception ===
School Ties has a 61% approval rating on Rotten Tomatoes based on 41 reviews with the consensus: "Led by an A+ cast, the road to School Ties is paved with good intentions that are somewhat marred by the honorable yet heavy-handed message against intolerance." Metacritic, which uses a weighted average, assigned the film a score of 65 out of 100, based on 21 critics, indicating "generally favorable" reviews. Audiences polled by CinemaScore gave the film an average grade of "A-" on an A+ to F scale.

Roger Ebert of the Chicago Sun-Times found the film "surprisingly effective", whereas Janet Maslin of The New York Times found it followed a "predictable path". Peter Rainer of the Los Angeles Times wrote that he wished that David Greene could have been made a more imperfect character.

== See also ==
- List of American football films
