= Born Yesterday (1993 film) =

1993 film by Luis Mandoki

- Theatrical release poster
- Directed by: Luis Mandoki
- Screenplay by: Douglas McGrath
- Based on: Born Yesterday; 1946 play by Garson Kanin
- Produced by: Stratton Leopold; D. Constantine Conte; Chris Soldo; Stephen Traxler
- Starring: Melanie Griffith; John Goodman; Don Johnson; Edward Herrmann
- Cinematography: Lajos Koltai
- Edited by: Lesley Walker
- Music by: George Fenton
- Production companies: Hollywood Pictures; Touchwood Pacific Partners I
- Distributed by: Buena Vista Pictures Distribution
- Release date: March 26, 1993
- Running time: 100 minutes
- Country: United States
- Language: English
- Box office: $17,952,857

Born Yesterday is a 1993 American comedy film based on the play of the same name by Garson Kanin. It stars Melanie Griffith, John Goodman and Don Johnson. It was adapted by Douglas McGrath and directed by Luis Mandoki. It is a remake of the 1950 film of the same name that starred Broderick Crawford, Judy Holliday (in an Academy Award winning performance) and William Holden.

== Plot ==
Businessman Harry Brock takes his girlfriend Billie Dawn to elite parties with politicians. Billie's background as a showgirl makes her uncultured and she innocently makes socially inept remarks on political issues. Harry thinks she can be taught, so he hires a reporter Paul Verrall to show her the ropes.

While educating Billie, Paul kisses her but Harry doesn't suspect anything. Paul teaches Billie a few sentences to make her appear intelligent and she impresses people at a party. Harry congratulates Paul for Billie's improvement but Billie feels like a ventriloquist dummy. Paul slowly falls in love with Billie.

Harry routinely asks Billie to sign some papers, creating companies in her name, which she is unaware of. After studying with Paul, Billie starts to read the documents Harry offers her to sign. This makes Harry angry and he slaps her but she signs them anyway. Harry also shouts at Senator Norval Hedges, incurring the disapproval of Billie.

Billie goes to Paul thinking she may have signed illegal documents. She helps Paul break into Harry's safe and steal the documents. Paul skims through the papers and learns that all the companies are in Billie's name. He also finds evidence of Harry illegally bribing senators.

Meanwhile, Harry is shopping for a wedding ring, comes to the hotel room with flowers and proposes to Billie but she rejects his proposal. Harry then goes to look at the documents in his safe but finds them missing. Billie reveals that Paul took the documents to publish in his paper. Paul arrives and kisses Billie, who declares that she wants to marry Paul. Billie tells Harry that she will return his companies back to him at the rate of one a year. She also urges him to get back the bribe money from the senators and wind up his illegal business activities.

== Cast ==
- Melanie Griffith as Billie Dawn
- John Goodman as Harry Brock
- Don Johnson as Paul Verrall
- Edward Herrmann as Ed Devery
- Max Perlich as JJ
- Fred Dalton Thompson as Senator Norval Hedges
- Nora Dunn as Cynthia Screiber
- Michael Ensign as Phillipe
- Benjamin C. Bradlee as Alex Duffee
- Sally Quinn as Beatrice Duffee
- Celeste Yarnall as Anna Hedges
- Rondi Reed as Victoria Penny
- Kate McGregor-Stewart as Mrs. Hulse

== Reception ==
Reviews to Born Yesterday were mostly negative. On Rotten Tomatoes the film holds an approval rating of 25% based on 28 reviews, with an average rating of 4.1/10. The site's critics consensus reads: "Not even Melanie Griffith's charisma can inject fresh energy into this ill-conceived remake, which awkwardly retreads through the classic original's story without any of its charm." Audiences surveyed by CinemaScore gave the film a grade of "B+" on scale of A+ to F. Melanie Griffith was nominated for the Golden Raspberry Award for Worst Actress for her performance in the film, where she lost to Madonna for her work in Body of Evidence at the 14th Golden Raspberry Awards.
