= Cop and a Half =

1993 film by Henry Winkler

- Theatrical release poster
- Directed by: Henry Winkler
- Written by: Arne Olsen
- Produced by: Paul Maslansky
- Starring: Burt Reynolds; Ray Sharkey; Ruby Dee; Norman D. Golden II
- Cinematography: Bill Butler
- Edited by: Daniel P. Hanley; Carroll Timothy O'Meara; Roger Tweten
- Music by: Alan Silvestri
- Production company: Imagine Entertainment
- Distributed by: Universal Pictures
- Release date: April 2, 1993
- Running time: 93 minutes
- Country: United States
- Language: English
- Budget: $14 million
- Box office: $40.7 million

Cop and a Half is a 1993 American family buddy cop-comedy film directed by Henry Winkler, and stars Burt Reynolds, Norman D. Golden II and Ray Sharkey in his final role. Reynolds plays veteran cop Nick McKenna who reluctantly takes eight-year-old boy Devon Butler (Golden) as his partner to solve a murder investigation.

Cop and a Half opened at #1 in the U.S. and grossed $40.7 million worldwide against a $14 million budget. The film was followed by a lower budgeted, direct-to-DVD sequel, Cop and a Half: New Recruit (2017).

== Plot ==
Devon Butler is an eight-year-old boy who lives in Tampa, Florida with his grandmother Rachel in a small apartment. Devon dreams of being a cop. He watches police TV shows, knows police procedures and plays cops and robbers with his friend Raymond Sanchez. One day, while snooping around in a warehouse, he witnesses a murder. He goes to the police station to report the crime where he meets Captain Rubio and Detective Nick McKenna, who dislikes children. The police try and get information out of Devon, but he refuses to give the information unless they make him a cop. They place him in protective custody with Detective McKenna and the two team up in a comic series of events to find the killer. They eventually take down Vinnie Fountain, the drug kingpin who ordered the hit, Devon becomes a real life hero and Detective McKenna changes his mind about disliking children. Life eventually returns to normal and Devon and Detective McKenna become friends.

== Cast ==
- Burt Reynolds as Detective Nick McKenna
- Norman D. Golden II as Devon Butler
- Ray Sharkey as Vinnie Fountain
- Ruby Dee as Rachel Baldwin
- Holland Taylor as Captain Rubio
- Frank Sivero as "Chu"
- Marc Macaulay as Waldo
- Tom McCleister as Rudy
- Ralph Wilcox as Detective Matt McPhail
- Rocky Giordani as Quintero
- Sammy Hernandez as Ray Sanchez
- Carmine Genovese as Rio
- Sean O'Neal as McNally
- Tom Kouchalakos as Detective Jenkins

== Production ==
Macaulay Culkin was approached to play Devon Butler. Culkin dropped out, along with Kurt Russell, who was attached to play Detective Nick McKenna, when the film was delayed for script rewrites. Devon was re-written to be female but was returned to male when Norman D. Golden II was cast. An entire B roll was shot using Peter Weller as McKenna. It was scrapped when Weller was found to be taking the film too seriously. Filming took place in Tampa, Florida, between April and June 1992.

Burt Reynolds reportedly argued with director Henry Winkler through the shoot and would become convinced that producer Brian Grazer refused to work with him again as a result. Despite several crew members alleging that Reynolds was difficult to work with, he behaved with incredible courtesy toward Golden. In a 2024 interview, Golden stated that he remembered that Reynolds as a "class act" who took issue with the disingenuous people who were "only around him for who he was". Golden recalls Reynolds as being responsive to the more genuine individuals around him.

== Music ==
The film's original score was composed by Alan Silvestri. Joey Lawrence's "Nothin' My Love Can't Fix" is used as the end title song.

== Reception ==
The film received mostly negative reviews from film critics, and holds a 13% approval rating on the film review aggregator site Rotten Tomatoes, based on 15 reviews, with an average rating of 3.3/10. Audiences surveyed by CinemaScore gave the film a grade of "B+" on scale of A+ to F.

Jay Boyar of the Orlando Sentinel wrote, "Just about the only really enjoyable thing about Cop and a Half is Norman D. Golden II, who is genuinely cute and a pretty good little actor besides." Film critic and historian Leonard Maltin also gave the film a negative review: "A hemorrhoid-and-a-half to anyone who sits all the way through this...abjectly painful comedy, which does about as much for Reynolds' career as Stop! Or My Mom Will Shoot did for Sylvester Stallone's. That it was Ray Sharkey's last movie adds insult to injury."

Critic Gene Siskel of the Chicago Tribune also excoriated the film, seeing it as indicative of "artistic bankruptcy" on Burt Reynolds' part, and singled out Norman D. Golden II's performance as "awkward". Siskel later called it the worst movie of 1993. Siskel speculated that NBC thought little of the film when they aired it in its broadcast-network debut, pointing out that they scheduled it opposite the 1997 Super Bowl.

However, Roger Ebert of the Chicago Sun-Times gave it 3 stars out of a possible 4, saying, "There isn't much that's original in Cop and a Half, but there's a lot that's entertaining, and there's a winning performance by a young man with a big name, Norman D. Golden II, who plays little Devon Butler, a kid who dreams of someday wearing the shield." On At the Movies, Siskel was baffled by Ebert's recommendation and said "The only thing more unnerving than this picture is that my esteemed colleague seated across the aisle, is the only major critic in America who recommended the film." In 1996, after Ebert convinced Siskel to vote thumbs down on Broken Arrow, Siskel unsuccessfully attempted to get Ebert to vote thumbs down on Cop and a Half.

=== Box office ===
The film debuted at number 1. In its second week it dropped to number 3. Industry analysts expected it to open with $4 million but it grossed $6 million. Variety attributed the film's opening to its poster, which they said is reminiscent of Kindergarten Cop. It grossed a total of $31.9 million in the U.S., and another $8.8 in other territories, for worldwide total of $40.7 million, making the film a considerable success against its modest $14 million budget.

== Awards ==
Awards	Category	Subject	Result
Stinkers Bad Movie Awards	Worst Picture		Nominated
Stinkers Bad Movie Awards	Worst Actor	Burt Reynolds	Nominated
Stinkers Bad Movie Awards	Worst Actor	Norman D. Golden II	Nominated
Golden Raspberry Awards	Worst Actor	Burt Reynolds	Won
Golden Raspberry Awards	Worst New Star	Norman D. Golden II	Nominated
Young Artist Award	Best Actor Under Ten in a Motion Picture	Norman D. Golden II	Nominated

== Sequel ==
A straight-to-DVD sequel, titled Cop and a Half: New Recruit, was released on August 10, 2017, starring Lou Diamond Phillips, Lulu Wilson, Janet Kidder, Michael Coleman, Giles Panton, Jordyn Ashley Olson and Wallace Shawn.
