= Indecent Proposal =

1993 American drama film by Adrian Lyne

- Theatrical release poster
- Directed by: Adrian Lyne
- Screenplay by: Amy Holden Jones
- Based on: Indecent Proposal by Jack Engelhard
- Produced by: Sherry Lansing; Michael Tadross
- Starring: Robert Redford; Demi Moore; Woody Harrelson; Oliver Platt; Seymour Cassel
- Cinematography: Howard Atherton
- Edited by: Joe Hutshing
- Music by: John Barry
- Distributed by: Paramount Pictures
- Release date: April 7, 1993
- Running time: 118 minutes
- Country: United States
- Language: English
- Budget: $38 million
- Box office: $266.6 million

Indecent Proposal is a 1993 American erotic drama film directed by Adrian Lyne and written by Amy Holden Jones. It is based on the 1988 novel by Jack Engelhard, in which couple David and Diana Murphy's marriage is disrupted by stranger John Gage's offer of a million dollars for Diana to spend the night with him. It stars Robert Redford, Demi Moore and Woody Harrelson.

Indecent Proposal was released by Paramount Pictures on April 7, 1993. The film received a mostly negative response from critics for the contrivances and implausibilities of its story. It also sparked controversy, with feminists arguing the film's premise promotes prostitution and the treatment of women as property. Despite this, the film was a box office success and grossed nearly $267 million worldwide on a $38 million budget, becoming the sixth highest-grossing film of 1993.

== Plot ==
David and Diana Murphy are married high school sweethearts living in California. Diana is working as a real estate agent, while David hopes to establish himself as an architect by designing their dream home. The couple invest everything they have in David's project, purchasing beachfront property in Santa Monica, California and beginning construction, but the recession leaves Diana without houses to sell and David without a job. In desperate need of $50,000 to save their land from being repossessed, they travel to Las Vegas to gamble with the last of their savings.

At a casino, Diana catches the eye of high roller John Gage, while David wins over $25,000 at craps. Reveling in their winnings, Diana assures David that she loves him regardless of the money. The next day, they lose everything at roulette; leaving the casino, they notice a crowd gathered to watch Gage play baccarat. Gage asks Diana to join him for good luck and she makes a winning craps roll on his $1 million bet. As thanks, Gage insists on paying for the Murphys' stay, giving them a lavish hotel suite and a dress he saw Diana admire. After an enjoyable evening together, Gage offers the couple $1 million to allow him to spend a night with Diana, with David flatly refusing.

Later, Diana convinces David to agree to Gage's proposal. David contacts his lawyer Jeremy Green, who prepares a contract for the arrangement. Leaving Diana with Gage, David has a change of heart and races to stop them but arrives just as they depart by helicopter. Gage flies Diana to his private yacht and offers her a chance to void their deal and return to David if he loses a toss of his lucky coin. He wins the toss and Diana spends the night with him.

Agreeing to forget the incident, the Murphys return home to discover that the bank had already foreclosed on and sold their land. Overcome with anger and jealousy, David accuses Diana of continuing to see Gage after finding his business card in her wallet, which she denies knowing about. Discovering that it was Gage who bought out their land, Diana angrily confronts him and rejects his attempts to pursue her. When she informs David, their tension reaches a breaking point and they separate; Diana allows David to keep the $1 million.

Weeks later, Gage visits Diana at work and renews his advances. Initially resistant, she eventually consents to spending time with him and a romance develops between them. David, meanwhile, turns to alcohol and eventually hits rock bottom, leading to a public confrontation with Gage and Diana. He pulls his life back together and finds a teaching position and Diana files for divorce. Finding her at a zoo benefit with Gage, David donates the entire $1 million in a charity auction bid, then makes his peace with Diana and signs their divorce papers.

Realizing that Diana will never love him the way she loves David, Gage lies to her that she is merely the latest member of his "million-dollar club" of women. Seeing through his deception, she gratefully ends their relationship; before parting ways, he gives her his lucky coin, which she realizes is double headed. Diana returns to the pier where David proposed to her seven years earlier, finding him there. Repeating their unique declaration of love, they join hands.

== Cast ==
- Robert Redford as John Gage
- Demi Moore as Diana Murphy
- Woody Harrelson as David Murphy
- Seymour Cassel as Mr. Shackleford
- Oliver Platt as Jeremy Green
- Billy Bob Thornton as Day Tripper
- Rip Taylor as Mr. Langford
- Billy Connolly as Auction MC
- Joel Brooks as Realtor
- Pamela Holt as David's Girlfriend
- Tommy Bush as Mr. Murphy
- Mariclare Costello as Mrs. Murphy
- Nicholas Georgiade as Croupier
- Joseph Ruskin as Pit Boss
- Lydia Nicole as Student
- Iqbal Theba as Student
- Elsa Raven as Student
- Chi Muoi Lo as Student
- Selma Archerd as Bidder
- Alan Purwin as Pilot
- Sheena Easton as Herself
- Herbie Hancock as Himself

== Production ==
=== Development ===
Paramount Pictures bought the rights to Jack Engelhard's 1988 novel Indecent Proposal for $120,000. Adrian Lyne signed on to direct, reuniting with producer Sherry Lansing, with whom he had worked on Fatal Attraction. Lyne had a falling out with past collaborator Stanley Jaffe, who wanted the film to be released by Christmas season of 1992 and thus allotted for limited post-production time.

The film was originally planned as a vehicle for Tom Cruise and Nicole Kidman, with Warren Beatty as John Gage. Kidman and Isabelle Adjani screen tested for the role of Diana Murphy. Cruise backed out amidst speculation that the film's morals conflicted with his new involvement in the Church of Scientology. Robert Redford accepted the part of Gage on the condition that his character be adjusted to be less of a villain. He turned down the $4 million salary initially offered to him in exchange for gross profit participation from the film's box office. Johnny Depp, Tim Robbins and William Baldwin were among the actors considered for the role of David Murphy. Woody Harrelson dropped out of the film Benny & Joon to commit to the role, resulting in a lawsuit from MGM-Pathé Entertainment that was settled out of court.

=== Writing ===
Of the script, screenwriter Amy Holden Jones said there were multiple third-act changes to the script, made primarily by men. Jones initially wrote the ending with Diana leaving Gage of her own accord, without prompting from Gage. Jones said: "I always had a lot of trouble with the movie after [David and Diana] split up. The men in charge, and particularly Redford, decided to make [Gage] very sympathetic. In the original script, it was a clear journey where she came to realize that she was his next acquisition. There were four or five people that Redford cycled through to work on his character. In my draft, what she said to him was that you can’t buy love, and then she left him. He had that changed, because Robert Redford couldn’t be left." Jones added: "I thought [Diana] should leave both men at the end. I brought it up several times [in studio meetings], including once the movie was greenlit. And that was basically laughed at. No one would consider it, really."

William Goldman says he was brought in to work on the script after John Cusack had turned it down. "They couldn’t get anyone to do it," he said. "I wrote a draft and I don’t think they changed anything. I don’t know why the actors decided to do it or didn’t do it, but it was an enormous success so that’s good for me."

=== Filming ===
Filming began in Las Vegas in June 1992. The casino scenes were filmed at the Westgate Las Vegas. After a month in Las Vegas, the production moved to southern California, where locations included the Echo Park neighborhood and a Santa Barbara mansion that stood in for Gage's home.

Lyne decided to feature the book Backlash: The Undeclared War Against American Women in a scene because author Susan Faludi had notably criticized Lyne's film Fatal Attraction. Lyne completed post-production work on the film roughly two weeks before its opening in April 1993.

=== Differences between novel and film ===
Engelhard's novel contained cultural friction that the screenwriter left out of the movie: the main character, named Joshua Kane, is Jewish, and his billionaire foil Sheikh Ibrahim is Arab. In a review of the novel, The New York Times summarized its themes as "the sanctity of marriage versus the love of money, the Jew versus significant non-Jews such as shiksas and sheiks, skill versus luck, materialism versus spirituality, Israel versus the Arab countries, the past versus the future, and the religious world versus the secular one."

== Reception ==
=== Box office ===
Indecent Proposal was a box office success, grossing $106,614,059 in the US and Canada and $159,985,941 internationally for a worldwide total of $266,600,000. The film opened on 1,694 screens in the United States and Canada on April 7, 1993, and grossed $18,387,632 in its opening weekend to top the US box office, the biggest opening at the time for an April release. It was number one for four weeks and became the sixth highest-grossing film of 1993. Some journalists attributed the audience turnout to Paramount's strong marketing campaign, as well as the film's sensational premise that made for heated debates.

It entered international release on April 23, 1993, previewing on 66 screens in Australia for the weekend. Despite only playing for three days, it topped the Australian box office for the week with a three-day gross of $0.8 million (A$1.16 million). It officially opened in Australia on April 29 and remained at number one for four more weeks. In the UK, it also benefited from previews in topping the UK box office with an opening weekend gross of $2.4 million (£1.5 million) including previews. It remained number one in the UK for three weeks. In Italy, it was Paramount/United International Pictures' second biggest ever opening with an opening weekend gross of $1.6 million.

=== Critical response ===
The film received negative reviews from critics, who cited the contrivances of the film's script and its underdeveloped characters. Critics noted that the film was the latest of a string of movies that involved women being treated as property, such as Pretty Woman, Honeymoon in Vegas and Mad Dog and Glory. A major criticism was that the film did not fully explore its potentially enticing premise. Janet Maslin of The New York Times wrote: "For all its ostensible daring, Indecent Proposal is much too cautious. None of the three principals really change as a consequence of the story. None of the frankness that might make matters interesting is allowed to sully the romantic mood. None of the characters have lives outside the confines of the story, although the lonely Gage, when celebrating a big gambling win, suddenly gives a party for 200 anonymous, soigne-looking friends."

In The Telegraph, Anthony Brett said that despite its packaging as a steamy thriller, "Indecent Proposal is in fact a largely distasteful and bizarrely plodding romantic drama, one that gently pokes at lofty ideas about power and marriage and the American dream but scurries away before it hits on anything too dicey." In Entertainment Weekly, Owen Gleiberman wrote: "Indecent Proposal starts out kinky and turns into a languid — and shockingly banal — domestic soap opera. Like 9 1/2 Weeks, the movie is all tease, all come-on. Next time Lyne should try for something a little more indecent."

Critics generally praised Redford's performance, but some lamented that the character of John Gage was given too much of a sympathetic edge, and that the role was merely a chance for Redford to once again play Jay Gatsby. Gleiberman wrote: "Like Michael Douglas' Gordon Gekko, he has that aura of money that’s almost tactile — even in his dark suit, he glows — and he speaks with the dry enticement of someone who has had too much of what he wants and now gets his kicks by testing people, living through their experiences."

Of Demi Moore, Maslin wrote, she "pours all of her effort into going through such motions smolderingly, and none into whatever sense may lie behind them. That's fine for the role; she falters only when the screenplay turns mute or turns up howlers." Todd McCarthy wrote: "What emotional legitimacy the film does possess stems from Moore's performance, which is lively, heartfelt and believable until the script ceases to permit it." Several critics found Harrelson to be the weak link of the cast, with McCarthy writing the actor is not given much to do except display "puppydog love in the first section and standard-issue jealousy in the second". However, multiple critics were complimentary of the film's supporting cast, particularly Oliver Platt as the Murphys' wisecracking, sleazy lawyer Jeremy Green.

Multiple critics opined that the film loses its narrative steam after the climactic deal takes place. In a 2014 review, Nathan Rabin wrote: "Indecent Proposal suffers from a distinct lack of stakes. The second [Diana returns from her night with Gage], the million dollars that just moments ago was going to change her and her husband's lives ceases to matter. Diana doesn’t want it. David doesn’t want it...Money ultimately doesn’t matter in the sleazy fairy-tale world of Indecent Proposal, only love, and when money threatens to soil that love, then it must be openly rejected."

The film also sparked significant backlash from feminists and critics for its depiction of a woman bartering with her body for the benefit of her husband. Peter Travers of Rolling Stone called the film "sexist propaganda." Activist Betty Friedan and filmmaker Callie Khouri argued the film promotes the idea of prostitution, with Friedan saying, "What does it say? Thirteen-year-old girls will see that movie and be told you don’t need to bother to do your homework or to get an MBA, all you need to do is diet enough to be anorexic, get some silicone and look for that lonely billionaire." Feminist writer Susan Faludi likened Gage's actions in the film to "essentially...raping a woman with money." Producer Denise Di Novi suggested the film could be characterized as a women in prison film, because it has a woman in a "submissive, controlled situation." Camille Paglia dissented, saying "What is it about this picture that moviegoers are in sync with? (Is it) women’s sexuality in ways feminist rhetoric is unable to define?"

Amy Holden Jones wrote a defense of the film in the Los Angeles Times, arguing that Diana had agency in her choice and that much of the criticism levied against the film came from male critics. Jones later said: "When the film was released, it caused a great deal of controversy, because, you know, how could I write this thing about a woman spending the night with this guy for a million dollars? The idea that a woman should not be tempted by any of those things, or she should be so pure that you can’t make a movie about her feeling that way — I mean, go watch some French cinema! It's more complicated than that. I’m as big a feminist as you’ll find, but part of feminism for me is that women can be portrayed not as visions of perfection on-screen, but as whole human beings with choices."

Among the few critics to review the film positively was Roger Ebert. Ebert gave the film a thumbs up on At the Movies, while his colleague Gene Siskel gave it a thumbs down. In his print review, Ebert admitted there "are large challenges to logic" and the plot is "manipulative", but said "there is a genuine romantic spirit at work here", concluding that a necessary suspension of disbelief is "why we line up at the ticket window: We want to leave the real world, for a couple of hours, anyway". He also described the film's decision to keep the actual night of adultery offscreen as wise.

Caryn James of The New York Times also gave a positive review, writing that while Honeymoon in Vegas and Mad Dog and Glory "dance around the issue of buying and bartering people, Indecent Proposal embraces it. It isn't aways a good film; it employs lazy voice-overs to express sappy sentiments about the Murphys' eternal love. But it turns an inflammatory plot into a surprisingly honest and entertaining movie." Her colleague Janet Maslin gave a similarly mixed response, saying the film "calls for grudging admiration. Working with a ridiculous premise and...[a] badly underwritten script...the director of Flashdance and Fatal Attraction has still come up with the sort of sexy pop parable that is his specialty. Mr. Lyne's films may not cast any new light on the human condition, but they do keep you glued to the screen."

On review aggregator Rotten Tomatoes, Indecent Proposal has a 34% "rotten" rating based on 47 reviews, with an average rating of 4.8/10. The consensus reads: "Lurid but acted with gusto, Indecent Proposal has difficulty keeping it up beyond its initial titillating premise." Audience response was less negative, with those polled by CinemaScore giving an average grade of "B" on an A+ to F scale. The film is listed in Golden Raspberry Award founder John Wilson's book The Official Razzie Movie Guide as one of the "100 most enjoyably worst movies ever made".

=== Awards and nominations ===
Award	Category	Recipient	Result
BMI Film & TV Awards	BMI Film Music Award	John Barry	Won
Golden Raspberry Awards	Worst Picture	Sherry Lansing	Won
Golden Raspberry Awards	Worst Director	Adrian Lyne	Nominated
Golden Raspberry Awards	Worst Actor	Robert Redford	Nominated
Golden Raspberry Awards	Worst Actress	Demi Moore	Nominated
Golden Raspberry Awards	Worst Supporting Actor	Woody Harrelson	Won
Golden Raspberry Awards	Worst Screenplay	Screenplay by Amy Holden Jones; Based on the novel by Jack Engelhard	Won
Golden Raspberry Awards	Worst Original Song	"(You Love Me) In All the Right Places"; Music by John Barry; Lyrics by Lisa Stansfield, Ian Devaney & Andy Morris	Nominated
Golden Screen Awards			Won
MTV Movie Awards	Best Female Performance	Demi Moore	Nominated
MTV Movie Awards	Most Desirable Female	Demi Moore	Nominated
MTV Movie Awards	Best Kiss	Demi Moore and Woody Harrelson	Won
Stinkers Bad Movie Awards	Worst Actor	Robert Redford	Nominated
Stinkers Bad Movie Awards	Worst Actress	Demi Moore	Nominated
Yoga Awards	Worst Foreign Film	Adrian Lyne	Won

== Soundtrack ==
The soundtrack was released on April 6, 1993, by MCA Records. "In All the Right Places" by Lisa Stansfield was released as the album's lead single on May 24, 1993 and is the film's theme song. Sheena Easton makes a cameo appearance in the movie performing "The Nearness of You" at a pivotal part of the movie. The length of the soundtrack is 60 minutes and 37 seconds. "No Ordinary Love" by English band Sade was also prominently featured in the film, though it was not included on its soundtrack album.

In 2015, Intrada Records released an album of John Barry's score.

Indecent Proposal: Music from the Original Motion Picture Soundtrack
No.	Title	Writer(s)	Producer(s)	Length
1.	"I'm Not in Love" (The Pretenders)	Graham Gouldman, Eric Stewart	Trevor Horn	3:50
2.	"What Do You Want the Girl to Do" (Vince Gill featuring Little Feat)	Allen Toussaint	Tony Brown	5:07
3.	"If I'm Not in Love With You" (Dawn Thomas)	Thomas	Scott Sheriff	3:38
4.	"Out of the Window" (Seal)	Seal	Horn	5:35
5.	"Will You Love Me Tomorrow" (Bryan Ferry)	Gerry Goffin, Carole King	Robin Trower	4:15
6.	"The Nearness of You" (Sheena Easton)	Hoagy Carmichael, Ned Washington	Patrice Rushen	3:16
7.	"In All the Right Places" (Lisa Stansfield)	John Barry, Stansfield, Ian Devaney, Andy Morris	Devaney	5:42
8.	"Instrumental Suite from Indecent Proposal"	Barry	Barry	25:20
9.	"A Love So Beautiful" (Roy Orbison)	Jeff Lynne, Orbison	Lynne	3:31

Chart (1993)	Peak position
Australia (ARIA Charts)	67
Dutch Albums Chart	71
US Billboard 200	137

== Remake ==
On July 30, 2018, Paramount Players announced that a remake of the film was in development, with the screenplay being written by Erin Cressida Wilson.

== In popular culture ==
In the American sitcom Seinfeld, Elaine Benes (Julia Louis-Dreyfus) compares herself to "Demi Moore in Indecent Proposal" in the Season 6 episode "The Secretary". In the episode, which aired four years after the movie was released, there is disagreement between George Costanza (Jason Alexander) and Jerry Seinfeld (played by himself) over how to pronounce Moore's given name.

The animation series The Simpsons's 2002 season 13 episode "Half-Decent Proposal" parodies the movie's premise.

In the television series Mad About You episode, "A Pair of Hearts", during the end credits, married couple Paul (Paul Reiser) and Jamie Buchman (Helen Hunt) are approached by a man (Patrick Neil Quinn) who offers a million dollars to sleep with Jamie. They immediately reply "Sure!", and, after a quick smooch, Jamie leaves with the man (to the laughter of the audience).

The British sitcom Peep Show's episode "Conference" interpolates the plot of the film throughout the episode. Alan Johnson (Paterson Joseph) meets Big Suze (Sophie Winkleman), the girlfriend of his employee Mark Corrigan (David Mitchell)'s flatmate Jeremy Usbourne (Robert Webb) and finds her attractive. Alan then enters Jeremy's room and offers him £530 to sleep with Big Suze. Jeremy, while initially hesitant, agrees. Jeremy tells Big Suze of the plan and she is horrified by what is being suggested and leaves Jeremy. Later on in the episode, Jeremy visits Big Suze's house to apologize and is surprised to find Alan answering the door in a bathrobe. It is then revealed that Alan and Big Suze have started dating. Towards the end of the episode, Jeremy confronts Alan for the money he feels he has been swindled out of. Alan then proceeds to give him £380 that he has in his wallet.

The TV series Impractical Jokers featured a punishment inspired by the movie in the episode "Indecent Proposal" where Sal Vulcano is forced to ask couples while working as a dance instructor's assistant if they would be willing to meet him in a more passionate setting in exchange for money.

== See also ==
- Lecherous millionaire
- List of films set in Las Vegas

Awards
Preceded by Shining Through	Golden Raspberry Award for Worst Picture; 14th Golden Raspberry Awards	Succeeded by Color of Night
