= Sherry Lansing =

American film studio executive (born 1944)

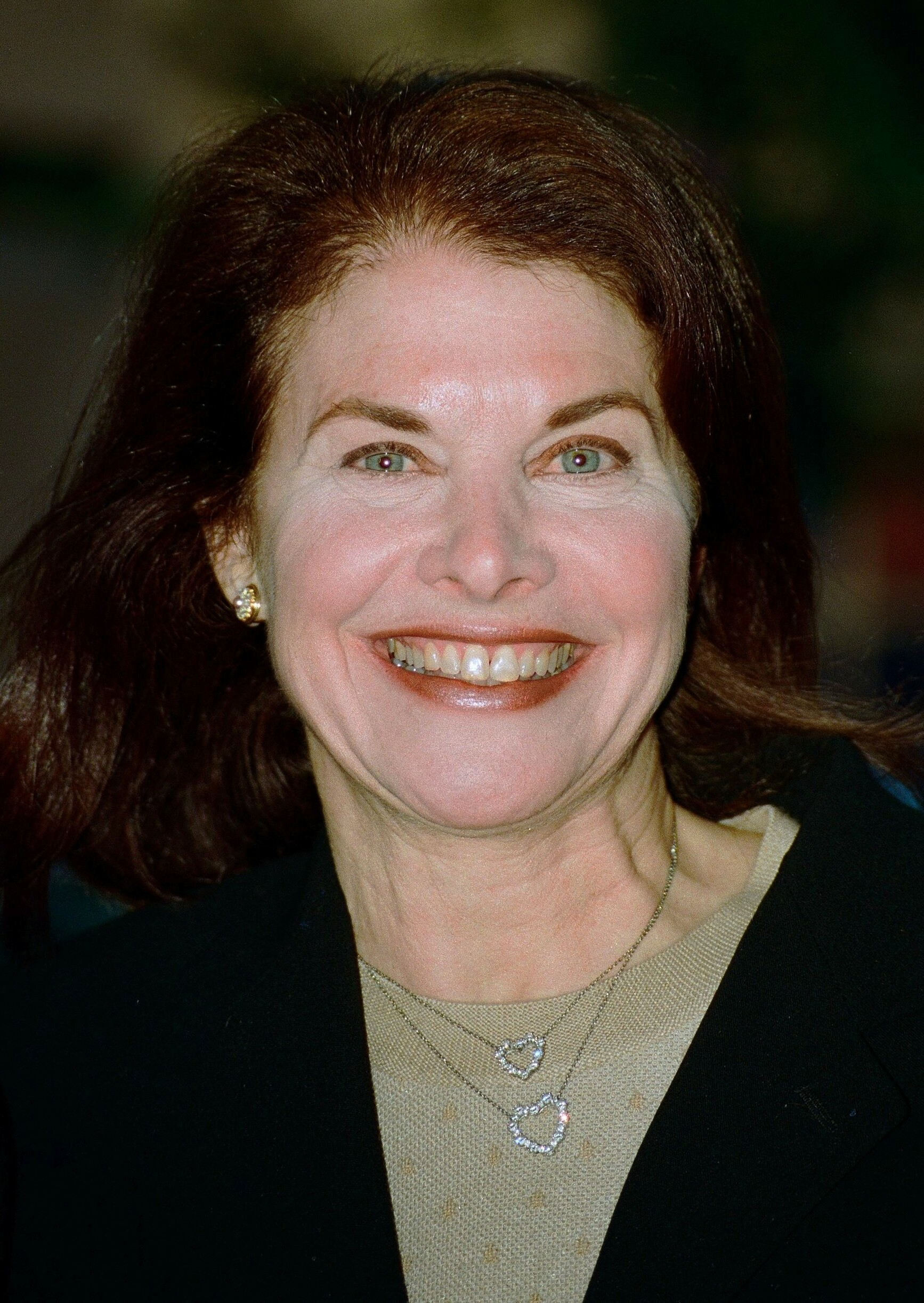
- Lansing in 2002
- Born: Sherry Lee Duhl; July 31, 1944 (age 82); Chicago, Illinois, U.S.
- Education: Northwestern University (BS)
- Occupations: Film studio executive; actress
- Years active: 1968–present
- Spouses: Michael Brownstein (m. 1967; div. 1970) William Friedkin (m. 1991; died 2023)

Sherry Lansing (born Sherry Lee Duhl; July 31, 1944) is an American former film studio executive serving as chairwoman of Universal Music Group's board of directors and as a director on the board of Paramount Skydance Corporation. She previously served as chairwoman and CEO of Paramount Pictures and president of production at 20th Century Fox before retiring. From 1999 to 2022, she was on the University of California Board of Regents.

In 2005, she became the first female film studio head to place hand and footprints at the Grauman's Chinese Theater. In 2001, she was named one of the 30 most powerful women in the US by Ladies' Home Journal, and The Hollywood Reporter named her number 1 on its Power 100 list numerous times.

== Early life and education ==
Lansing was born Sherry Lee Duhl in Chicago, Illinois, to Margaret Heimann and real estate investor David Duhl. Her mother fled from Nazi Germany in 1937, at the age of 17. After her father died when Lansing was nine, her mother remarried Norton S. Lansing. Her close-knit, well-to-do family is of German-Jewish descent.

Lansing attended the University of Chicago Laboratory Schools and graduated in 1962. In 1966, she earned a Bachelor of Science degree at Northwestern University and graduated cum laude. She was a member of Sigma Delta Tau sorority.

== About ==
=== Career ===
==== Acting ====
Lansing briefly dabbled in acting in 1970, appearing as Susan in the rom-com Loving, starring Eva Marie Saint and George Segal, and Amelita in Academy Award-winning director Howard Hawks' last film Rio Lobo, starring John Wayne. Lansing also appeared in several television shows and documentaries about films, and the actors, and actresses, starring in them. Dissatisfied with her own acting skills, she decided to learn more about the film industry from the ground up.

==== Production ====
Lansing took a job with MGM as head script reader. She then became VP of Production at Columbia Pictures and oversaw two highly successful films, The China Syndrome and Kramer vs. Kramer, both released in 1979. Her work at Columbia Pictures eventually led to an appointment with 20th Century Fox in 1980, at age 35, as the first female production president of a major studio. She resigned in December 1982 and became a partner with Stanley R. Jaffe (with whom she shares a birthday) to form Jaffe-Lansing Productions based at Paramount Pictures. The company released a consistent string of minor hits through Paramount before achieving box-office success with Fatal Attraction in 1987, for which Jaffe and Lansing received Academy Award nominations for Best Picture the following year.

The partnership also produced The Accused (1988) starring Jodie Foster, about rape and its impact on a victim's life. The film featured a graphic rape scene and was highly controversial when released. Made with a small budget of $6 million, it grossed over $37 million worldwide, becoming a box office hit.

Other Jaffe-Lansing productions include Black Rain (1989), starring Michael Douglas, Andy Garcia, and Ken Takakura, as well as School Ties (1992), starring Brendan Fraser. On her own, Lansing produced the very successful Indecent Proposal (1993), starring Robert Redford, Demi Moore, and Woody Harrelson.

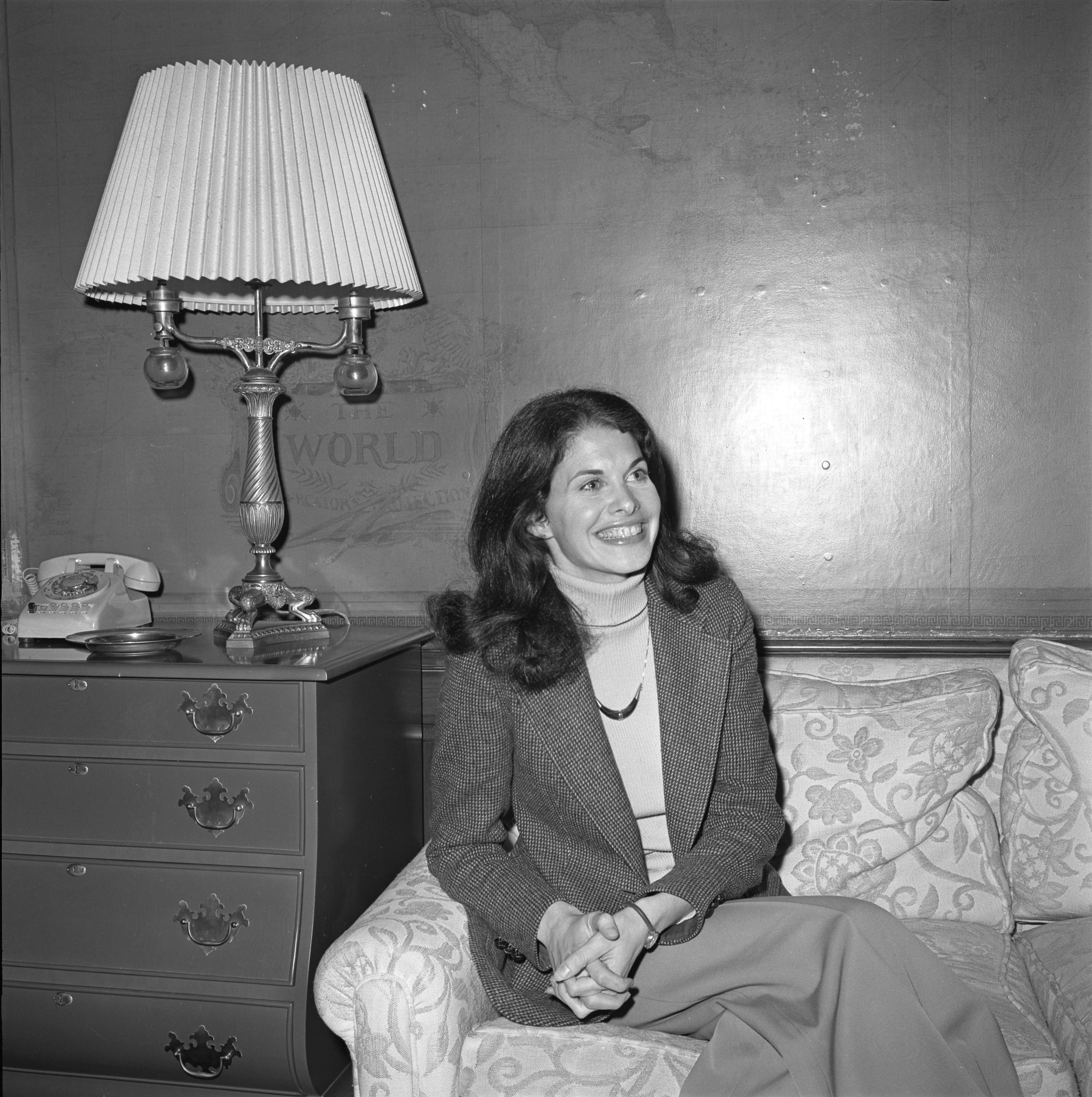
Lansing in 1980

==== Chair of Paramount Pictures ====
In 1992, Lansing was offered the chair of Paramount Pictures' Motion Picture Group. During her tenure at Paramount, the studio enjoyed its longest and most successful string of releases since the 1930s. Under Lansing, the studio produced such hits as Forrest Gump, Braveheart, Mission: Impossible, and what was, at the time, history's highest-grossing film – Titanic (the latter during a partnership with 20th Century Fox).

Viacom (which purchased Paramount in 1994) split the company into two parts in 2004, and Lansing stepped down at the end of that year after an almost unprecedented twelve-year tenure atop Hollywood's legendary "Best Show in Town".

She served as a Regent of the University of California from 1999 to 2022, and as chairman of the board from 2011 to 2013. She sits on the boards of the Broad Museum, The Carter Center, the Entertainment Industry Foundation, The W.M. Keck Foundation, the Lasker Foundation, the Pacific Council on International Policy, and Scripps Research. In 2007, she founded the EnCorps STEM Teachers Program, on whose board she serves as chair. She is also co-founder of the Stand Up To Cancer initiative, which funds research teams bringing cancer treatments to patients faster.

==== Chairman of Universal Music Group Board of Directors ====
Lansing was named Chairman of the Board of Directors of the Universal Music Group in 2023.

==== Philanthropy ====
In 2005, she created the Sherry Lansing Foundation, which is dedicated to raising awareness and funds for cancer research, K-12 public education, and encore career opportunities. She is a recipient of UCLA Anderson School of Management's highest honor-the Exemplary Leadership in Management (ELM) Award.

In 2007, she received the Jean Hersholt Humanitarian Award for her work in cancer research at the 79th Academy Awards.

In 2011, Lansing pledged $5 million to University of Chicago Laboratory Schools to build a new arts wing, including a 250-seat performance venue.

In March 2020, she hosted a fundraiser for Joe Biden at her home. In 2025, organized a fundraiser for the re-election campaign of Susan Collins, the Republican Senator from Maine.

== Personal life ==
Lansing married fellow student Michael Brownstein in 1967 while attending Northwestern University. They divorced in 1970. She was married to director William Friedkin from 1991 until his death in 2023.

Lansing and former MGM studio head James T. Aubrey were struck by a car while crossing Wilshire Boulevard in 1978. Both were badly hurt, and Lansing had to use crutches for a year and a half.

== Filmography ==
=== Producer ===
- Firstborn (1984)
- When the Time Comes (1987) (TV)
- Fatal Attraction (1987)
- The Accused (1988)
- Black Rain (1989)
- School Ties (1992)
- Indecent Proposal (1993)

=== Actress or herself ===
- The Good Guys (1968) (TV)
- Loving (1970)
- Rio Lobo (1970)
- Dan August (1971) (TV)
- Ironside (1971) (TV)
- Hollywood Women (1993) (TV)
- Frasier (1996) (TV)
- The Directors (1999) (TV)
- Sunday Morning Shootout (2004) (TV)
- Black Rain: Post-Production (2006)
- Black Rain: Making the Film – Part 2 (2006)
- Black Rain: The Script, the Cast (2006)
- Black Rain: Making the Film – Part 1 (2006)
- Coming Attractions: The History of the Movie Trailer (2006)
- Boffo! Tinseltown's Bombs and Blockbusters (2006)Herself
- ... A Father... A Son... Once Upon a Time in Hollywood (2005) (TV)
- The 79th Annual Academy Awards (2007) (TV)
- The Jewish Americans (2008) (TV)
- The Brothers Warner (2008)
- Entertainment Tonight (2008)

== Awards and recognition ==
- 2017: National Women's Hall of Fame Inductee
- 2008: CSHL Double Helix Medal Honoree
- 2007, Jean Hersholt Humanitarian Award, presented by Academy of Motion Picture Arts and Sciences
- 2007, Honorary Doctorate in Humane Letters from Pennsylvania State University
- 2006, American Association for Cancer Research Public Service Award
- 2006, Business hero, The My Hero Project
- 2005, Big Brothers Big Sisters (L.A.) Legacy Award
- 2005, Exemplary Leadership in Management Award presented by UCLA Anderson School of Management
- 2005, hand and foot prints at Grauman's Chinese Theater
- 2004, Horatio Alger Humanitarian Award
- 2003, Woodrow Wilson Award for Corporate Citizenship
- 2003, Honorary Doctorate in Fine Arts from the American Film Institute
- 2002, President's Award, presented by Academy of Science Fiction, Fantasy & Horror Films
- 2000, Milestone Award presented by Producers Guild of America
- 1996, Overcoming Obstacles Achievement Award for Business, presented by Chicago Women in Film
- 1996, YWCA Silver Achievement Award
- 1996, Pioneer of the Year by the Foundation of the Motion Picture Pioneers
- 1996, Star on the walk of fame, presented by Hollywood Walk of Fame
- 1994, Outstanding Alumna Award presented by Sigma Delta Tau (ΣΔΤ) Sorority
- 1994, Razzie for Indecent Proposal, presented by Razzie Awards
- 1993, Golden Plate Award of the American Academy of Achievement
- 1992, Simon Wiesenthal Center Distinguished Service Award for the Performing Arts
- 1989, Alfred P. Sloan, Jr. Memorial Award
- 1988, Oscar nomination for Fatal Attraction, presented by Academy of Motion Picture Arts and Sciences
- 1982, Distinguished Community Service Award from Brandeis University
- 1981, Crystal Award, presented by Women in Film for outstanding women who, through their endurance and the excellence of their work, have helped to expand the role of women within the entertainment industry.
- 1980, Economic Equity Award from the Women's Equity Action League
