= Body of Evidence (1993 film) =

1993 film by Uli Edel

- Theatrical release poster
- Directed by: Uli Edel
- Written by: Brad Mirman
- Produced by: Dino De Laurentiis
- Starring: Madonna; Willem Dafoe; Joe Mantegna; Anne Archer; Julianne Moore; Jürgen Prochnow
- Cinematography: Douglas Milsome
- Edited by: Thom Noble
- Music by: Graeme Revell
- Production company: Dino De Laurentiis Communications
- Distributed by: Metro-Goldwyn-Mayer
- Release dates: January 7, 1993 (Ziegfeld Theatre); January 15, 1993 (United States)
- Running time: 99 minutes
- Countries: Germany; United States
- Language: English
- Budget: $30 million
- Box office: $38 million

Body of Evidence is a 1993 erotic thriller film directed by Uli Edel, written by Brad Mirman and produced by Dino De Laurentiis. The film stars Madonna and Willem Dafoe, and features Joe Mantegna, Anne Archer, Julianne Moore and Jürgen Prochnow in supporting roles.

Widely considered to be a vanity project for Madonna and derided for its plot inconsistencies and incongruous dialogue, it marked her fourth film performance to be universally panned by critics, following Shanghai Surprise (1986), Who's That Girl (1987) and Bloodhounds of Broadway (1989).

In France and Japan, the film was released under the name Body. In Japan, Madonna's other 1993 film Dangerous Game was released there as Body II even though the films have nothing in common nor are related to each other in narrative.

== Plot ==
The elderly and wealthy Andrew Marsh dies from complications stemming from an erotic incident involving bondage and homemade pornography. The main suspect is his lover Rebecca Carlson who proclaims her innocence to lawyer Frank Dulaney. Initially believing her, Frank agrees to represent her.

District Attorney Robert Garrett seeks to prove that Rebecca deliberately killed Marsh in bed to receive the $8 million he left her in his will. As the trial begins, Rebecca and Frank enter a sadomasochistic sexual relationship behind the back of Frank's unsuspecting wife Sharon. During their first sexual encounter, Rebecca secures Frank's arms behind his back using his own belt and alternately pours hot wax and champagne on him before having sex.

After an ex-lover of Rebecca's, Jeffrey Roston, testifies that he also had a heart condition, changed his will to favour Rebecca and that she was sexually domineering and compelled him to engage in sexual activity with no regard to his health, describing an incident that clearly resonates with Frank's own experience, Frank attempts to end their affair.

Sharon confronts him about the affair having figured it out from a phone call with Rebecca as well as the strange marks on his body from the hot wax. Frank goes to Rebecca's home and accuses her of telling Sharon about them, although Sharon says she worked it out from her tone alone. Rebecca taunts Frank and he pushes her to the ground. Rebecca begins to masturbate on the floor in front of him. Rebecca pulls out handcuffs, Frank forcibly cuffs her hands instead and forces anal sex upon her. She resists, he raped her.

Footage from Marsh's home video reveals that he had an affair with his secretary, Joanne Braslow, who is a key witness against Rebecca. He also had previously left Joanne more money in his will before beginning his relationship with Rebecca. She says that she was hurt but she loved him and would never hurt him. However, there is evidence that she bought the murder weapon. Rebecca suggests to Frank that Joanne tried to frame her but he is now less sure of her innocence in the crime. Rebecca takes the stand and her surprising testimony that Roston had an affair with another man convinces the jury, which acquits her. Before leaving court, she mockingly thanks Frank and indicates that she is guilty after all.

Frank still cannot resist going to Rebecca's home, where he overhears an incriminating conversation between her and Marsh's doctor Alan Paley. He confronts the co-conspirators, realizing that it was Paley who supplied the fatal dose of cocaine. Rebecca is amused by Frank's discovery of her manipulating him but Paley is shocked to learn that she was in a sexual relationship with Frank as well. Rebecca mocks both men, bluntly acknowledging that she used her sexual prowess to control and humiliate both of them, as well as Marsh. Paley realizes she does not care about him and becomes enraged.

After a struggle with Frank who tries to save Rebecca, Paley shoots her twice. She plunges from a window to her death. Paley is arrested for murdering her. Before leaving the scene with Sharon to repair their relationship, Frank then tells Garrett he should've won the case with Garrett replying: "I did".

== Cast ==
- Madonna as Rebecca Carlson
- Willem Dafoe as Frank Dulaney
- Joe Mantegna as Robert Garrett
- Anne Archer as Joanne Braslow
- Julianne Moore as Sharon Dulaney
- Stan Shaw as Charles Briggs
- Charles Hallahan as Dr. McCurdy
- Lillian Lehman as Judge Mabel Burnham
- Mark Rolston as Detective Reese
- Jeff Perry as Gabe
- Richard Riehle as Detective Griffin
- Jürgen Prochnow as Dr. Alan Paley
- Frank Langella as Jeffrey Roston
- Michael Forest as Andrew Marsh
- Corey Brunish as Jamie

== Production ==
Body of Evidence was largely filmed in Portland, Oregon in the spring of 1992, with the Pittock Mansion serving as a primary location. The cemetery scene featured in the beginning of the film was shot on location at Lone Fir Cemetery. After a month of shooting wrapped in Portland, the production moved to Los Angeles where filming was finished.

Julianne Moore said her nude scene in this movie was "just awful": "I was too young to know better. It was the first time I'd been asked to get naked and it turned out to be completely extraneous and gratuitous."

== Release ==
=== Box office ===
Body of Evidence performed poorly at the box office. In its second week it experienced a 60% drop. It grossed $13 million in the United States and Canada and $25 million internationally for a worldwide total of $38 million.

=== Home media ===
Body of Evidence was released on VHS on June 16, 1993, by MGM/UA Home Video. Despite its poor performance at the box office, Body of Evidence, like other erotic thrillers of the time, found success in the home video market and was a popular rental title.

=== Censorship ===
The film originally received the rare NC-17 rating from the Motion Picture Association of America. The first theatrical release was censored for the purpose of obtaining an R rating, reducing the film's running time from 101 to 99 minutes. The video premiere, however, restored the deleted material.

=== Critical response ===
Body of Evidence opened to mostly negative reviews. Released in the wake of Basic Instinct (1992), many contemporary reviewers noted the film as an attempt to cash-in on the success and controversy of Basic Instinct and other erotic thrillers of the time. M. Scot Skinner of the Arizona Daily Star wrote that despite being a "lame rip-off of Basic Instinct, the movie is not without entertainment value. You will find yourself laughing out loud on more than one occasion. The humor might be unintentional, but hey, with movies this bad, who's complaining?" Jack Matthews of Newsday wrote that Madonna excelled in the erotic scenes, but criticized her acting, noting that "when it comes to reading a line or reacting to a line or simply walking into a room as if she were someone else, no can do." Of the movie he wrote: "There is no way to overstate the ludicrousness of Body of Evidence, a Basic Instinct wannabe made from a script that 20 years ago could have been promoted as a sequel to Deep Throat."

Body of Evidence has an 8% rating at Rotten Tomatoes based on 38 reviews, with a rating average of 3.10/10. The critical consensus reads, "Body of Evidence's sex scenes may be kinky, but the ludicrous concept is further undone by the ridiculous dialogue." Metacritic assigned the film a weighted average score of 29 out of 100, based on 17 critics, indicating "generally unfavorable" reviews. Audiences surveyed by CinemaScore gave the film a grade of "C" on scale of A+ to F. The film appeared on the 2005 list of Roger Ebert's most hated films. The screenplay and performances were especially disparaged. His colleague Gene Siskel called Body of Evidence a "stupid and empty thriller" that is worse than Madonna's softcore coffee table book Sex. Julianne Moore later regretted acting in the film and went on to call it "a big mistake".

=== Accolades ===
Award	Category	Recipient	Result
Fantasporto	Best Film	Uli Edel	Nominated
Golden Raspberry Awards	Worst Picture	Dino De Laurentiis	Nominated
Golden Raspberry Awards	Worst Director	Uli Edel	Nominated
Golden Raspberry Awards	Worst Actor	Willem Dafoe	Nominated
Golden Raspberry Awards	Worst Actress	Madonna	Won
Golden Raspberry Awards	Worst Supporting Actress	Anne Archer	Nominated
Golden Raspberry Awards	Worst Screenplay	Brad Mirman	Nominated
MTV Movie Awards	Most Desirable Female	Madonna	Nominated
Stinkers Bad Movie Awards	Worst Actress	Madonna	Nominated

== Sources ==
- Bergen, Teresa; Davis, Heide (2021). Historic Cemeteries of Portland, Oregon. Charleston, South Carolina: Arcadia Publishing. ISBN 978-1-467-14861-0.
