= The Temp (film) =

- Theatrical release poster
- Directed by: Tom Holland
- Written by: Kevin Falls; Tom Engleman
- Produced by: Tom Engelman; David Permut
- Starring: Timothy Hutton; Lara Flynn Boyle; Dwight Schultz; Oliver Platt; Faye Dunaway
- Cinematography: Steve Yaconelli
- Edited by: Scott Conrad
- Music by: Frédéric Talgorn
- Distributed by: Paramount Pictures
- Release date: February 12, 1993
- Running time: 96 minutes
- Country: United States
- Language: English
- Budget: $15 million
- Box office: $6.4 million

The Temp is a 1993 American neo-noir psychological thriller film directed by Tom Holland and starring Timothy Hutton, Lara Flynn Boyle and Faye Dunaway. Its plot follows troubled businessman Peter Derns, whose life is upturned after the arrival of Kris Bolin, a mysterious female temp worker in his office. Oliver Platt, Dwight Schultz, Steven Weber, and Maura Tierney appear in supporting roles.

Written by Kevin Falls and Tom Engleman, The Temp was originally conceived as a thriller with pronounced elements of dark humor, but was reshaped by its studio, Paramount Pictures, into a more straightforward thriller, based on the success of such films as The Hand That Rocks the Cradle (1992). Principal photography took place in Portland, Oregon, in the spring of 1992.

The film was slated for a Christmastime release in December 1992, but, after Holland's original climactic sequence proved too violent for test audiences, Paramount mandated that a new ending be added. Reshoots of the climactic sequence began in January 1993, approximately one month before its rescheduled release date of February 12, 1993. The Temp was a box-office bomb, grossing only $6 million. It received generally negative reviews, with some critics praising the performances, though many commented that the film seemed tonally uneven.

== Plot ==
Peter Derns is a recently divorced father and executive for a baked goods company in Portland, Oregon, who has just been released from a clinic after being treated for paranoia. On his first day back at work, he is upset to find that his company has been taken over by a major food conglomerate who are making cutbacks. Peter's ruthless boss and supervisor, Charlene Towne, demands a complete report by Peter on a new product the following day. When Peter's personal assistant, Lance, is unavailable, he frets that he will never make the deadline. But to Peter's good fortune, the company assigns him a temp worker, an attractive young Stanford graduate named Kris Bolin.

Kris quickly endears herself to Peter by solving product issues and proving herself unflaggingly loyal and quick-witted. Simultaneously, various people around the office meet with unfortunate "accidents", beginning when Lance is maimed by a paper shredder, forcing him to take an extended leave of absence. Peter's workplace rival, Jack Hartsell, is subsequently found dead from a wasp sting in his stalled car on the Marquam Bridge, while Roger Jasser, the vice president of the company, is later found hanging in his office in an apparent suicide. Each of these successive deaths give Peter unearned promotions in the company. When Peter inquires about why Kris would take such a low-earning position given her educational background, she tells him she prefers to work temp jobs in order to see how she fits within the company and that she has yet to find the "right fit." In conversation, Kris explains that a photo of a man and child on her desk is her estranged husband Mark,and daughter Lizzy.

After Peter refuses Kris' advances for a sexual relationship, he finds himself the subject of various professional troubles that threaten his career. Believing he is being sabotaged and gaslit, Peter suspects his old friend from a rival company, Brad Montroe, as well as Charlene, whom he theorizes may be trying to save her career by destroying his; he also suspects Kris. Peter begins researching Kris' past with the help of Sara Meinhold, another secretary and discovers that Kris's former boss Ted Fine died mysteriously. He also learns that Kris never attended Stanford. Peter confronts her but she denies his accusations. The following morning, Peter is shunned in the office after someone frames him for leaking confidential company information. However, Kris comes to his aid by accepting responsibility for the "computer error," which earns Peter's promotion to vice president and Kris' promotion to marketing executive.

As a reward, Charlene sends Peter and Kris to the company's bakery on a weekend retreat. En route, they find that the brakes to Kris' car have been tampered with. After checking into the hotel, Peter gets a message from Charlene about an emergency at the bakery. Upon going there, he finds a dead security guard, and Kris, who appears to be suffering from a mild concussion. He is subsequently hit over the head by an unseen assailant. In his disoriented state, Peter wanders out of the office to see Kris struggling with Charlene along a catwalk. Peter intervenes to prevent Charlene from strangling Kris to death. In the melee, Charlene falls from a plank and is left hanging from a railing. He attempts to pull her up but she falls to her death but not before saying, "The picture".

Months later, Peter is rebuilding his relationship with his wife Sharon and their son Nathan and has been made president of the company. As he settles into Charlene's former office, he discovers several identical framed photos left behind of Kris' husband and daughter Mark and Lizzy; he is shocked when Charlene's secretary, Rosemary, explains that she bought the picture frames for Charlene, and that the pictures in them are stock photos the frames came with. Recalling Charlene's final words, Peter realizes that she too had detected Kris' duplicity. Peter confronts Kris about the photo and accuses her of orchestrating the bakery incident to kill Charlene and possibly himself. Kris again tries to assuage him, explaining that she presented the photo as her husband and daughter as a means of discouraging male co-workers from hitting on her. Peter, finally realizing that Kris is a master manipulator and sociopath, knows he cannot prove her culpability in any of the events. To rid himself of Kris once and for all, Peter simply fires her and orders her detained until the police can escort her out.

== Cast ==
- Timothy Hutton as Peter Derns
- Lara Flynn Boyle as Kris Bolin
- Dwight Schultz as Roger Jasser
- Oliver Platt as Jack Hartsell
- Steven Weber as Brad Montroe
- Faye Dunaway as Charlene Towne
- Colleen Flynn as Sara Meinhold
- Scott Coffey as Lance
- Maura Tierney as Sharon Derns
- Dakin Matthews as Dr. Feldman
- Lin Shaye as Rosemary
- Michael Winters as Mercer
- Danny Swanson as Nathan Derns
- Demene Hall as Marla Higgins
- Jesse Vint as Larry
- Moultrie Patten as Walt

== Analysis ==
The Temp has been identified as one of a series of neo-noir revival films from the early 1990s that focus on femme fatales within the corporate ladder, such as Basic Instinct (1992), Disclosure (1994) and The Last Seduction (1994).

== Production ==
=== Concept ===
The screenplay was written by Kevin Falls and Tom Engelman. According to Falls, the screenplay was finished in 1989. In an interview at the time of the production, director Tom Holland described the film as an "erotic thriller with comedy overtones." Producer David Permut likened the film to "Working Girl gone bad," and stated that he had been assisting in developing the project for several years before production began. "I've always been interested in those people who come into our lives and have access to all our information," Permut said. "We all have people in our lives like this, and if they want to, they can use it against us."

=== Casting ===
Timothy Hutton was cast in the lead role of Peter Derns in March 1992. Lara Flynn Boyle, who had recently acquired fame for her portrayal of Donna Hayward on David Lynch's series Twin Peaks, was cast in the female lead role of Kris Bolin. For the role, Boyle gained 15 pounds (6.8 kg). In the role of Charlene Towne, Peter's domineering boss, Faye Dunaway was cast. Dunaway wrote in her autobiography that she had accepted the role as she felt the film had the potential to become a mainstream hit and to allow her to reconnect with a larger audience.

=== Filming ===
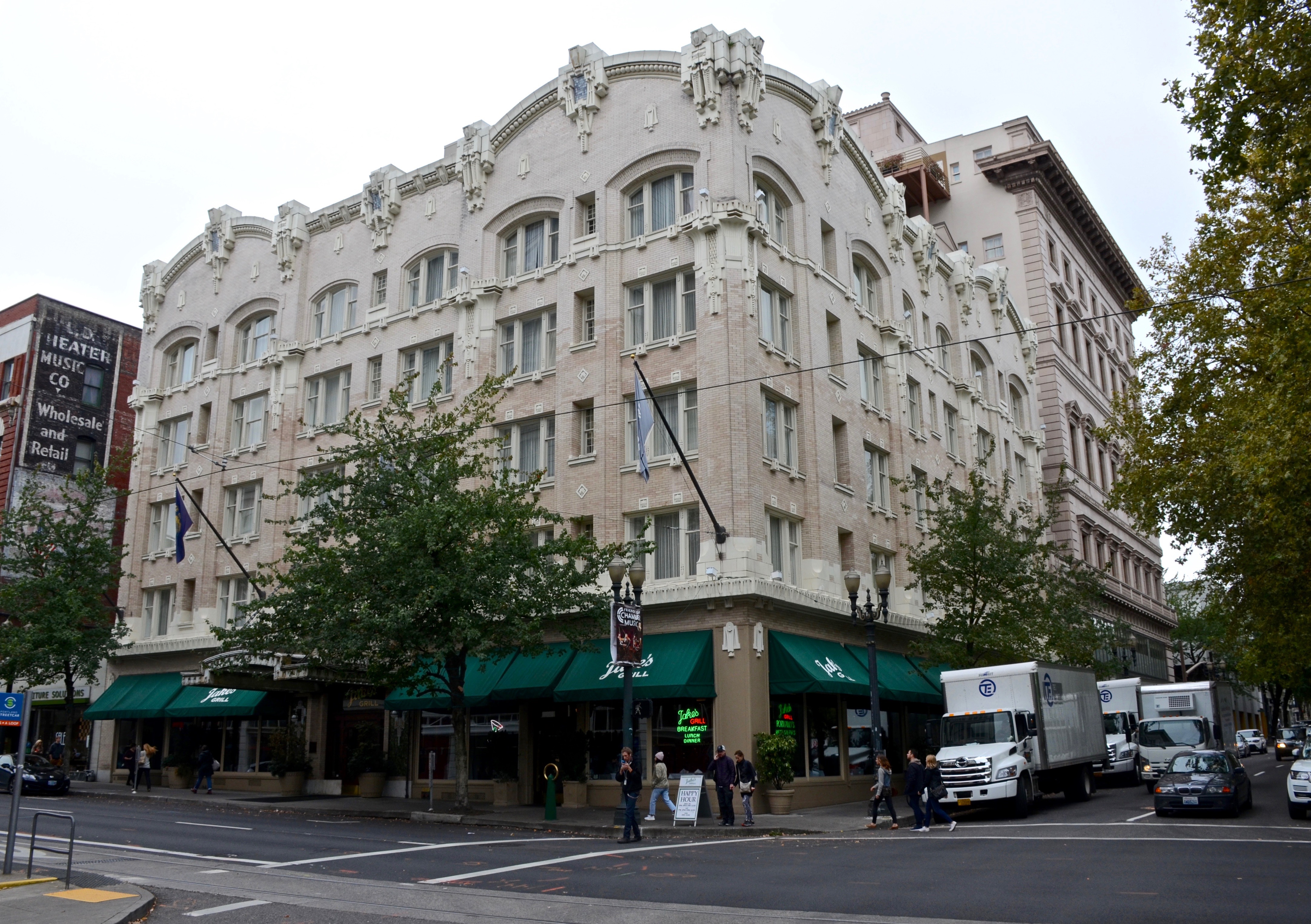
Much of filming took place in the historic Princeton Building in Portland, Oregon

Principal photography began on April 9, 1992, and filming mainly took place in and around Portland, Oregon. The majority of filming took place in the historic Princeton Building in Downtown Portland. Additional filming took place in the South Park Blocks on the Portland State University campus, while the company picnic sequence was shot at Battle Ground Lake in Washington, approximately 50 miles (80 km) from Portland. Additional live footage of a basketball game between the Portland Trail Blazers and Golden State Warriors, attended by Hutton and Dunaway, was completed in the Portland Memorial Coliseum; this footage was featured in the film. The sequence where Peter and Kris drive along the coast was filmed on Highway 101 between Cannon Beach and Manzanita, Oregon.

Filming concluded in June 1992. In an interview with local journalists, actress Faye Dunaway commented that she was "glad to be in Gus Van Sant territory," referencing the local filmmaker. "It's like a town version of New York. You can walk around. People are hanging out in coffee shops." Hutton later recalled of the shoot: "There were a lot of differences of opinion. Not with the cast, but with everybody else, in terms of what kind of movie was being made. The script read like a kind of interesting sort of character study of what happens to a man’s life when his family falls apart and he’s not happy with his job, and then this temp ends up coming in and sort of grabbing this person at their most vulnerable moment and taking over their life." Additionally, Hutton stated that he suspected the studio had been influenced by the success of The Hand That Rocks the Cradle, released the year before and had attempted to mould the film into something similar, thus interfering with the original screenplay, which incorporated more dark humor. Several cast and crew members recalled that, upon arriving in Portland, Dunaway became increasingly demanding.

=== Post-production ===
The film's original ending, as filmed by Holland, had Peter fighting for his life against Kris inside the bakery factory. The tussle results in Peter being thrown into cookie dough before falling onto a large conveyor belt; in the struggle, Kris' hand is chopped off by a piece of machinery before the conveyor belt slides her into an oven, incinerating her. When this conclusion proved too gruesome for test audiences, Paramount ordered that a new ending be added. The film had been scheduled for a December 1992 release but was pushed back to accommodate reshoots.

Several writers devised alternate climaxes to the film, some of which had Kris as the killer, with others that revealed Charlene as the real villain in a twist ending. On January 18, 1993, less than one month before the film was scheduled to premiere, reshoots of the climactic sequence began, as Paramount rushed to complete the film. In the final theatrical cut, the finale has Charlene falling to her death in the factory, followed by a dénouement in which Peter realizes that Charlene knew of Kris' lies; upon confronting Kris, Peter fires her. Screenwriter Falls, who was not involved in writing the climax as seen in the final theatrical cut, described it as a "mess," though he conceded that the original ending was "too violent." Engelman, the co-writer, commented that he and Falls had originally envisioned an ending that was "much more comic... what we ended up with was a more straight-lined thriller." The final scene in which Peter fires Kris was written by Nick Meyer.

Falls reflected on the last act of the film: "The ending is the result of a collaborative effort on the part of the filmmakers, the test audiences and the studio. The studio system, for better or worse, operates by collaboration." Dunaway expressed extreme displeasure with the reshoots, commenting: "Once again, I could see myself being thrown into playing the extreme —‌ what was initially conceived as a character in the tradition of Diana in Network was being turned into a high-gloss female executive/slasher. The new ending wasn't enough to salvage the film, though. By the final scene, it didn't matter who was the killer, the film had been dead for an hour at least."

== Release ==
=== Box office ===
The film was released on February 12, 1993, in 1,438 theatres, and grossed $2.8 million during its opening weekend. It was considered a box office bomb, finishing with $6.4 million domestically, under its $15 million budget.

=== Critical response ===
Hal Hinson of The Washington Post commented on the film's tone, writing: "Some of the movie plays as if it were intended to be tongue-in-cheek, but other parts are played straight, making it appear that Holland and his screenwriter Kevin Falls couldn't make up their minds about what sort of movie they wanted to make. The performers look a little baffled too." Janet Maslin of The New York Times similarly commented that the film "starts well and runs into trouble about midway through. It never quite decides how evil or powerful Kris ought to be, which means the film's improbably violent moments seem tacked-on," though praised Hutton's performance as "confident and appealing." Owen Gleiberman of Entertainment Weekly panned the film, awarding it a D rating and deeming it "a lethally predictable thriller." Writing for the Chicago Tribune, Johanna Steinmeitz noted that director Holland "deserves credit for suspenseful pacing and for eliciting committed-if one-dimensional-performances," but ultimately felt that the film "belongs on a shelf with five-and-dime windup toys. It works fairly well, in a mechanical sort of way, if you don't mind second-rate story material and cheap plot devices."

On review aggregator Rotten Tomatoes, the film has an approval rating of 32% based on 22 reviews. The site's critical consensus states: "The Temp has an intriguing résumé, but consistently underperforms; immediate reassignment is recommended." Audiences polled by CinemaScore gave the film an average grade of "C+" on an A+ to F scale.

Dunaway won the Golden Raspberry Award for Worst Supporting Actress for her performance in the film at the 14th Golden Raspberry Awards.

=== Home media ===
Paramount Home Video released The Temp on VHS on August 25, 1993. Paramount subsequently issued the film on DVD on April 16, 2002. Shout! Factory released the film for the first time on Blu-ray on January 11, 2022. The disc contains interviews with Tom Holland, actress Lin Shaye, special effects artist Steve Johnson and editor Scott Conrad as well as a theatrical trailer.

== Sources ==
- Dunaway, Faye (1995). Looking for Gatsby: My Life. New York: Simon & Schuster. ISBN 978-0-684-80841-3.
- Gordon, William (1995). Shot on This Site: A Traveler's Guide to the Places and Locations Used to Film Famous Movies and TV Shows. New York: Citadel Press. ISBN 978-0-806-51647-9.
- Lindpop, Samantha (2015). Postfeminism and the Fatale Figure in Neo-Noir Cinema. Basingstoke, England: Palgrave Macmillan. ISBN 978-1-137-50359-6.
- Williams, Linda Ruth (2009). "A Woman Scorned: The Neo-Noir Erotic Thriller as Revenge Drama". In Bould, Mark; Glitre, Kathrina; Tuck, Greg (eds.). Neo-Noir. New York: Columbia University Press. pp. 168–185. ISBN 978-0-231-85047-6.
