= Norman D. Golden II =

American actor

- Born: April 7, 1984 (age 42); Racine, Wisconsin, U.S.
- Occupations: Actor; rapper
- Years active: 1992–2003

Norman D. Golden II (born April 7, 1984) is an American former actor best known for his performance in the 1993 film Cop and a Half as Devon Butler.

== Career ==
In 1992, Golden became a series regular on Fox's True Colors. The sitcom, about an interracial family and their learning to co-exist, was canceled shortly after Golden's arrival in the second season. In 1993, Golden starred in the motion picture Cop and a Half with Burt Reynolds. His last known acting job was a television remake of Moby-Dick in 1998 because he wanted to make a bigger focus on his education.

For a period, he performed as a rapper known as Enormus. However, in a 2024 interview he referred to his period as a professional rapper as a "phase" that he is no longer pursuing professionally and now instead retains a "hobby".

== Awards ==
Golden was nominated for a Young Artist Award in 1992–1993 for Best Actor Under Ten in a Motion Picture. Golden was also nominated for a Razzie Award for Worst New Star.

== Filmography ==
- Moby Dick (TV) – 1998: Little Pip
- Gone Fishin' – 1997: Young Gus
- America's Dream (TV) – 1996: Aaron
- Sisters (TV) – 1994: Dexter Warren
- On Promised Land (TV) – 1994: Jimmy "Jim Jam" Ween:
- Cop and a Half – 1993: Devon Butler
- There Are No Children Here (TV) – 1993: Pharoah Rivers
