= Indecent Proposal (novel) =

1988 novel by Jack Engelhard

- 1989 edition (Dutton)
- Author: Jack Engelhard
- Language: English
- Published: 1988
- Publisher: Donald I. Fine
- Publication place: United States
- Media type: Print
- Pages: 296
- ISBN: 1556111118

Indecent Proposal is a 1988 novel by Jack Engelhard.

== Plot ==
Joshua Kane, a descendant of Holocaust survivors and a veteran of the Israeli army, is stuck in an unfulfilling corporate job where, although making fairly decent money (31k in 1987) he constantly feels that he is not living up to his potential. His beautiful wife Joan comes from a wealthy Philadelphia family from the Main Line area and seems satisfied with the state of their marriage. Josh and Joan were both married to other people before leaving them and marrying each other.

Josh admires Sheik Ibrahim's status and attributes. Under normal circumstances, they would have no interaction. However, Josh possesses a relationship with Joan, whom Ibrahim wants to meet.

Bit by bit, Josh and then Joan are drawn further into Ibrahim’s orbit. A telephone call, a dinner invitation and then a fateful meeting. In response to being made aware of Ibrahim's propositioning of Joan while they were at dinner, Josh confronts Ibrahim in the latter's suite only to receive an offer: one million dollars for a night with his wife. Josh then tells Joan, who is not entirely unreceptive. After a few days of tortured rationalizing and complications at Josh’s place of employment, they accept the offer.

A limo comes to get Joan shortly afterwards. Josh’s tails the limo for the drive from Philadelphia to Atlantic City. Josh sees Joan exit from the Versailles hotel, observes her resolve and unflinching will to see this though and then checks into a nearby cheaper hotel that his “good friend” Sy comps for him. Josh takes sleeping pills in order to get through the night. He then groggily wakes up and goes to the Versailles where he finds Ibrahim gambling. Ibrahim invites him upstairs and they discuss the prior night and what motivates Ibrahim. Ibrahim offers to show Josh his souvenir from the night before. Ibrahim reveals that he filmed Joan having sex with him and that she was unaware that she was being filmed. Ibrahim shows Josh the sex tape. All the things that Josh had thought of beforehand as “betrayal” were there.

Ibrahim berates Josh then mentions that his attempts to get Joan to leave Josh were unsuccessful. While Ibrahim is lost in thought, Josh secures the tape but is caught by Ibrahim. The two men struggle for it as Josh gets the better of Ibrahim and is able to cast the tape into the ocean. Ibrahim re-directs his approaching entourage away from Josh to go retrieve the film. Josh then confronts Sy. Turns out this "good friend” betrayed Josh and Joan to Ibrahim so that he could land the high-roller at his own casino. Josh makes his displeasure known and ends their friendship. Josh returns to Philadelphia and to Joan. He asks what happened and is told “nothing.” He mentions the tape, then says he was joking. Joan keeps asking about the tape over the next few days but Josh remains evasive.

Josh and Joan's marriage begins to deteriorate. Josh refuses to touch Joan and rebuffs her attempts at intimacy. He ponders her fading looks. Joan talks of putting a hedge around their marriage and reads books on getting the love back into their relationship and another on suicide. Their attempts at a romantic dinner, an outing at the Phillies game and a planned trip to New York City all lead to various levels of dissatisfaction, culminating in Joan’s attempt to take her own life. Josh moves back to Israel and in an attempt to leave the past behind joins the Navy. Joan surprises him by finding him there and saying that she wants to continue fighting for their relationship.

== Adaptations ==
In 1993, the novel was adapted into a film of the same name by director Adrian Lyne.

In 2020, a musical version by Dylan Schlosberg and Michael Conley was staged at London's Southwark Playhouse.
