= Qayamat: City Under Threat =

2003 Indian film by Harry Baweja

- Theatrical release poster
- Directed by: Harry Baweja
- Screenplay by: Harry Baweja; Suparn Verma
- Dialogues by: Pathik Vats
- Story by: Harry Baweja
- Based on: The Rock by: David Weisberg; Douglas S. Cook
- Produced by: Pammi Baweja; Paramjeet Baweja
- Starring: Ajay Devgn; Suniel Shetty; Neha Dhupia; Sanjay Kapoor; Arbaaz Khan; Isha Koppikar; Riya Sen
- Cinematography: Sanjay F. Gupta
- Edited by: Merzin Tavaria
- Music by: Songs: Nadeem-Shravan; Score: Salim–Sulaiman
- Production company: Baweja Movies
- Release date: 11 July 2003
- Running time: 157 minutes
- Country: India
- Language: Hindi
- Budget: ₹12 crore (US$1.2 million)
- Box office: ₹28.95 crore (US$3.0 million)

Qayamat: City Under Threat (transl. Doomsday / Apocalypse: City Under Threat), shortly called Qayamat, is a 2003 Indian Hindi-language action thriller film directed by Harry Baweja. It stars Ajay Devgn, Suniel Shetty, Sanjay Kapoor, Arbaaz Khan, Isha Koppikar, Neha Dhupia, Riya Sen, and Aashish Chaudhary. It is a remake of the 1996 American film The Rock. It was the first Indian film to be digitally colour corrected. The film was shot in Australia, Mauritius, and Diu. It also marks the second collaboration between Devgn, Shetty and Baweja after Dilwale (1994).

The film was released on 11 July 2003 and was moderately successful at the box office. It received praise for the action and cinematography, while the pacing, performances and excess songs received criticism.

== Plot ==
The Central Bureau of Investigation (CBI) has assigned the case of three terrorists to honest CBI officer Akram Sheikh. The three terrorists are brothers Ali and Abbas Ramani and their common girlfriend, Laila. They are accomplices of a plan masterminded by an evil Pakistani military man named Brigadier Rashid who is the leader of ISI (Inter-Services Intelligence). Ali, Abbas, and Laila hitch a plan to extort money from the Indian government, leave in a ship to Pakistan and take asylum from them. They take control of Elphinston Jail, in the city of Mumbai and using the help of a corrupt scientist, Gopal, who is a member of a team headed by scientist Rahul, investigating the effects of a deadly virus which could kill any living organism within a 3-kilometer radius, they load three missiles with the virus. They then take a group of 213 tourists hostage in the jail, including Rahul's girlfriend Sheetal and demand a ransom of 1500 crores from the government within 24 hours, failing which they will release the missiles into major water bodies in Mumbai, thus creating an apocalypse (Qayamat).

Akram asks the Chief Minister to allow him to release Rachit, a man who has previous experience of escaping from Elphinston Jail, a feat which has never been accomplished in history, to get help in entering the jail, through the very route which he had used to escape. Rachit is a man who has been silent for a long time now, since the love of his life, Sapna, was killed the night he was arrested. Rachit was an associate of Ali and Abbas and had been double-crossed by them (and another associate whom he killed after escaping from jail), leading to his arrest. The brothers had also apparently killed Sapna. However, unknown to Rachit, she survived. Akram and his team, which includes Rahul use Rachit's help to enter the jail through, first, an underwater route, and then a maze of tunnels through which Rachit had escaped. They successfully get to the septic tank of the jail, but the corrupt Home Minister of Maharashtra who is helping the terrorists for personal gain gives the news of the team's arrival to Ali and Abbas, whose men kill the whole team in a brutal gunfight, resulting in Akram's death as well. Rahul and Rachit are the only ones that are alive.

Rachit suffers from severe mental trauma, the effects of which can be seen every 12 hours, whereby he starts hallucinating and seeing odd shadows everywhere. He has even lost his power of speech due to this. These effects are taken away, when Sapna, who arrives at the CBI headquarters, calls him on a walkie-talkie and assures him of her true love and the fact that she is indeed alive. This is enough for Rachit as he gets up and single-handedly takes out all of Ali and Abbas's men, one by one. Sheetal escapes captivity and joins Rahul and Rachit.

Rahul is able to disarm the missiles one by one and kill Gopal. However, while Rachit is taking out his remaining men and beating his brother, Ali gets to the last missile and tries to release it. Laila captures Rahul on gunpoint, saying she will kill Rahul if Rachit does not leave Abbas. Rahul asks Rachit to let him die, but, Rachit shoots Rahul in the leg. Rahul falls down, and Rachit shoots Laila in the head, killing her. Abbas tries to escape, but Rachit kills him. Rachit disarms the last missile and kills Ali. Thus, the city of Mumbai and the hostages are saved in the nick of time. Maharashtra's corrupt Home Minister is arrested and Rashid is killed in an air strike. At the end of the film, Rachit reunites with Sapna and reveals that he can talk.

== Cast ==
- Ajay Devgan as Rachit, Sapna's love interest.
- Suniel Shetty as CBI Officer Akram Shaikh
- Neha Dhupia as Sapna, Rachit's love interest.
- Sanjay Kapoor as Abbas Rehmani
- Arbaaz Khan as Ali Rehmani
- Isha Koppikar as Laila
- Riya Sen as Sheetal, Rahul's love interest.
- Aashish Chaudhary as Rahul Gupta
- Chunky Pandey as Gopal
- Ayub Khan as Billu
- Deep Dhillon as Brigadier Rashid-Ul-Haq
- Anjan Srivastav as Chief Minister of Maharashtra Nekchand
- Kulbhushan Kharbanda as CBI Chief Khurana
- Govind Namdev as Maharashtra Home Minister Manohar
- Raveena Tandon as Akram's Lover (special appearance)

== Production ==
Harry Baweja had offered the leading role to Urmila Matondkar but it did not materialise due to Urmila's date problems. The film marked the comeback of Chunky Pandey to Bollywood after a stint in Bengali films since the late 1990s. Neha Dhupia's voice was dubbed by dubbing artist Rajanika Ganguly Mukherjee as the director thought her voice did not suit her character perfectly.

The Elphinston Jail of Mumbai copy described in it was originally situated in Diu Island, Daman & Diu, U.T, India.

== Reception ==
Taran Adarsh from Bollywood Hungama gave the film 2 stars out of 5, finding the first half ordinary, the songs forced and the romantic past of Devgn's character, patience-testing. However, he appreciated the action sequences, background score and other technical aspects, remarking that the film looked "international". Writing for Rediff.com, Priya Ganapati found the film too slow for an action thriller due to being replete with songs, but was highly appreciative of the action sequences, cinematography and background score. However, much akin to Adarsh, she also felt the usage of technical jargons might prove to be incomprehensible for many viewers.

== Soundtrack ==
Qayamat

Soundtrack album by Nadeem-Shravan
- Released: 21 June 2003
- Genre: Feature film soundtrack
- Language: Hindi
- Producer: Nadeem-Shravan

The music is composed by Nadeem-Shravan and the lyrics are by Sameer. One of the most popular songs "Woh Ladki Bahut Yaad Aati Hai" was sung by Kumar Sanu & Alka Yagnik. According to the Indian trade website Box Office India, with around 21,00,000 units sold, this film's soundtrack album was the year's fifth highest-selling.

#	Song	Singer
1.	"Woh Ladki Bahut Yaad Aati"	Kumar Sanu, Alka Yagnik
2.	"Dil Chura Liya"	Abhijeet, Kavita Krishnamurthy
3.	"Aitbaar Nahi Karna"	Abhijeet, Sadhana Sargam
4.	"Mujhe Tumse Mohabbat Hai"	Kumar Sanu, Mahalakshmi Iyer
5.	"Yaar Pyaar Ho Gaya"	Abhijeet, Alisha Chinai
6.	"Aitbaar Nahi Karna"	Abhijeet
7.	"Mera Dil Dil Tu Lele"	Shaan, Mahalakshmi Iyer
8.	"Woh Ladki Bahut Yaad Aati" (Sad)	Kumar Sanu
9.	"Qayamat Qayamat"	Sonu Nigam, Hema Sardesai
