= MTV Movie Award for Best Actor in a Movie =

This is a following list of the MTV Movie Award Winners and Nominees for Best Performance from 1992 on Awards. In all but five years, the awards are separated into male and female categories.

== Winners and Nominees ==
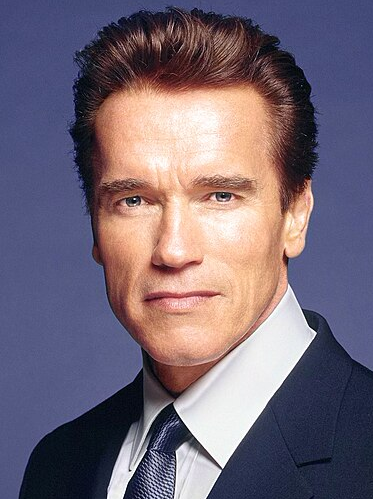
First winner of male performance award category - Arnold Schwarzenegger in Terminator 2: Judgment Day, 1992

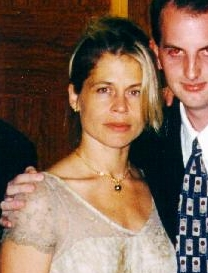
First winner of female performance award category - Linda Hamilton in Terminator 2: Judgment Day, 1992

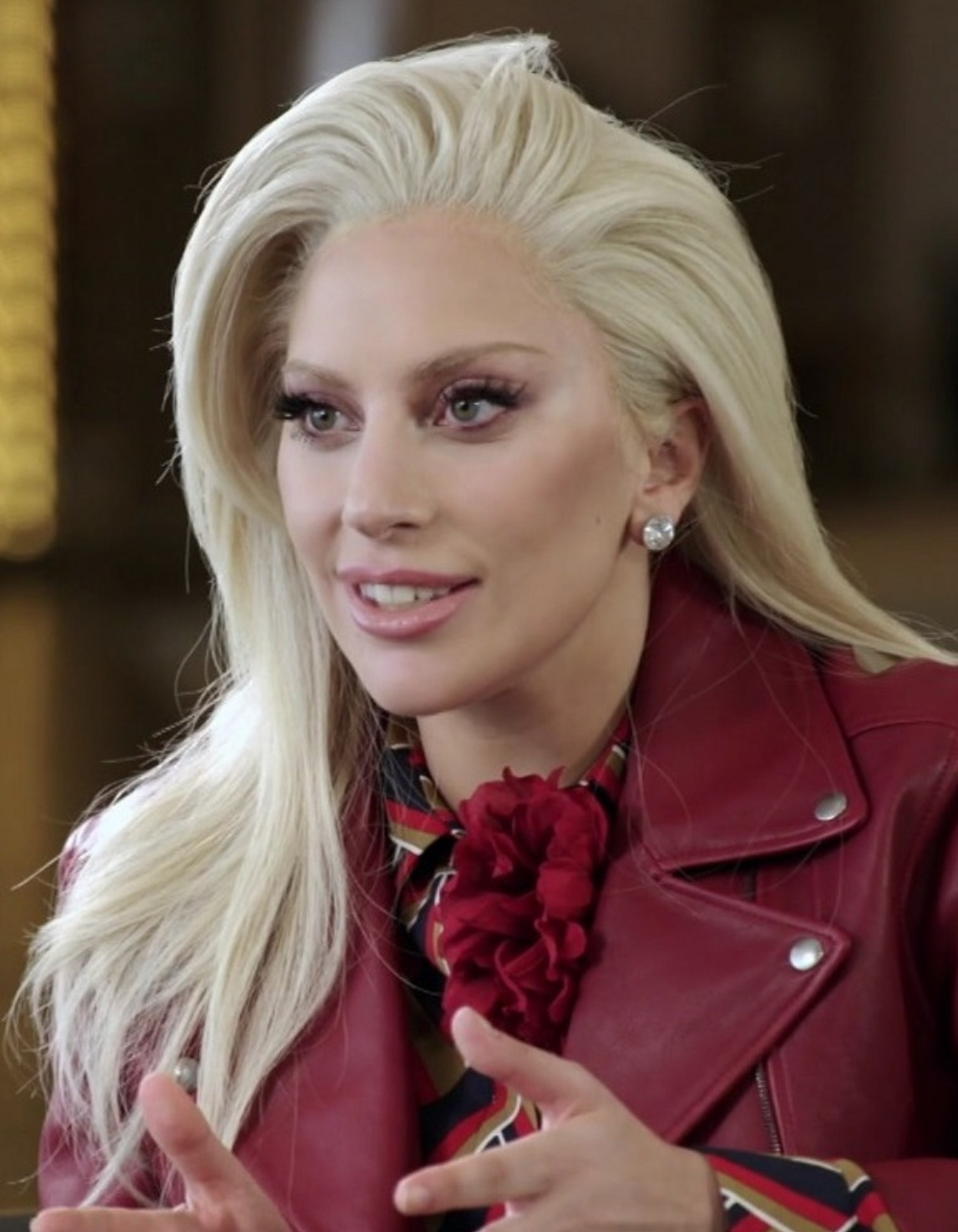
Most recent winner in female performance award category - Lady Gaga in A Star Is Born, 2019

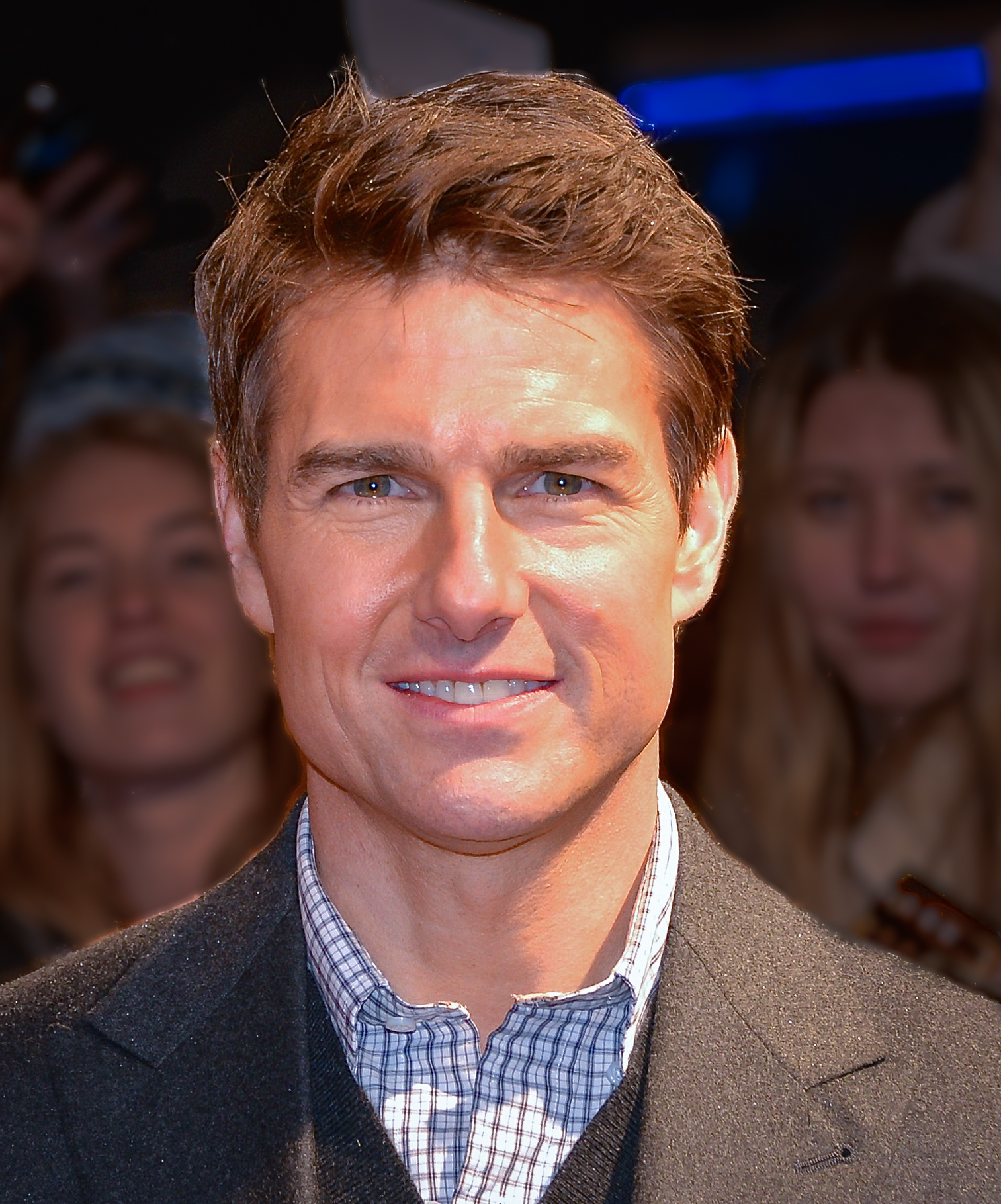
Most recent winner in male performance award category- Tom Cruise in Top Gun: Maverick, 2023

=== 1990s ===
Year	Category	Actor	Film	Character
1992; 1st	Male Performance	Arnold Schwarzenegger	Terminator 2: Judgment Day	The Terminator
1992; 1st	Male Performance	Kevin Costner	Robin Hood: Prince of Thieves	Robin Hood
1992; 1st	Male Performance	Robert De Niro	Cape Fear	Max Cady
1992; 1st	Male Performance	Val Kilmer	The Doors	Jim Morrison
1992; 1st	Male Performance	Robin Williams	The Fisher King	Henry Sagan / Parry
1992; 1st	Female Performance	Linda Hamilton	Terminator 2: Judgment Day	Sarah Connor
1992; 1st	Female Performance	Geena Davis	Thelma and Louise	Thelma Dickinson
1992; 1st	Female Performance	Rebecca De Mornay	The Hand That Rocks the Cradle	Peyton Flanders
1992; 1st	Female Performance	Mary Elizabeth Mastrantonio	Robin Hood: Prince of Thieves	Maid Marian
1992; 1st	Female Performance	Julia Roberts	Dying Young	Hilary O'Neil
1993; 2nd	Male Performance	Denzel Washington	Malcolm X	Malcolm X
1993; 2nd	Male Performance	Kevin Costner	The Bodyguard	Frank Farmer
1993; 2nd	Male Performance	Tom Cruise	A Few Good Men	Lieutenant Daniel Kaffee
1993; 2nd	Male Performance	Michael Douglas	Basic Instinct	Nick Curran
1993; 2nd	Male Performance	Jack Nicholson	A Few Good Men	Col. Nathan Jessep
1993; 2nd	Female Performance	Sharon Stone	Basic Instinct	Catherine Tramell
1993; 2nd	Female Performance	Geena Davis	A League of Their Own	Dottie Hinson
1993; 2nd	Female Performance	Whoopi Goldberg	Sister Act	Deloris Van Cartier
1993; 2nd	Female Performance	Whitney Houston	The Bodyguard	Rachel Marron
1993; 2nd	Female Performance	Demi Moore	A Few Good Men	Lt. Commander Joanne Galloway
1994; 3rd	Male Performance	Tom Hanks	Philadelphia	Andrew Beckett
1994; 3rd	Male Performance	Tom Cruise	The Firm	Mitch McDeere
1994; 3rd	Male Performance	Harrison Ford	The Fugitive	Dr. Richard Kimble
1994; 3rd	Male Performance	Val Kilmer	Tombstone	Doc Holliday
1994; 3rd	Male Performance	Robin Williams	Mrs. Doubtfire	Daniel Hillard / Mrs. Doubtfire
1994; 3rd	Female Performance	Janet Jackson	Poetic Justice	Justice
1994; 3rd	Female Performance	Angela Bassett	What's Love Got to Do with It	Tina Turner
1994; 3rd	Female Performance	Demi Moore	Indecent Proposal	Diana Murphy
1994; 3rd	Female Performance	Julia Roberts	The Pelican Brief	Darby Shaw
1994; 3rd	Female Performance	Meg Ryan	Sleepless in Seattle	Annie Reed
1995; 4th	Male Performance	Brad Pitt	Interview with the Vampire	Louis
1995; 4th	Male Performance	Tom Hanks	Forrest Gump	Forrest Gump
1995; 4th	Male Performance	Brandon Lee	The Crow	Eric Draven / The Crow
1995; 4th	Male Performance	Keanu Reeves	Speed	Jack Traven
1995; 4th	Male Performance	John Travolta	Pulp Fiction	Vincent Vega
1995; 4th	Female Performance	Sandra Bullock	Speed	Annie Porter
1995; 4th	Female Performance	Jamie Lee Curtis	True Lies	Helen Tasker
1995; 4th	Female Performance	Jodie Foster	Nell	Nell Kellty
1995; 4th	Female Performance	Meg Ryan	When a Man Loves a Woman	Alice Green
1995; 4th	Female Performance	Uma Thurman	Pulp Fiction	Mia Wallace
1996; 5th	Male Performance	Jim Carrey	Ace Ventura: When Nature Calls	Ace Ventura
1996; 5th	Male Performance	Mel Gibson	Braveheart	William Wallace
1996; 5th	Male Performance	Tom Hanks	Apollo 13	Jim Lovell
1996; 5th	Male Performance	Brad Pitt	12 Monkeys	Jeffrey Goines
1996; 5th	Male Performance	Denzel Washington	Crimson Tide	Lieutenant Commander Ron Hunter
1996; 5th	Female Performance	Alicia Silverstone	Clueless	Cher Horowitz
1996; 5th	Female Performance	Sandra Bullock	While You Were Sleeping	Lucy Eleanor Moderatz
1996; 5th	Female Performance	Michelle Pfeiffer	Dangerous Minds	LouAnne Johnson
1996; 5th	Female Performance	Susan Sarandon	Dead Man Walking	Sister Helen Prejean
1996; 5th	Female Performance	Sharon Stone	Casino	Ginger McKenna
1997; 6th	Male Performance	Tom Cruise	Jerry Maguire	Jerry Maguire
1997; 6th	Male Performance	Leonardo DiCaprio	Romeo + Juliet	Romeo
1997; 6th	Male Performance	Eddie Murphy	The Nutty Professor	Sherman Klump
1997; 6th	Male Performance	Will Smith	Independence Day	Steven Hiller
1997; 6th	Male Performance	John Travolta	Phenomenon	George Malley
1997; 6th	Female Performance	Claire Danes	Romeo + Juliet	Juliet
1997; 6th	Female Performance	Sandra Bullock	A Time to Kill	Ellen Roark
1997; 6th	Female Performance	Neve Campbell	Scream	Sidney Prescott
1997; 6th	Female Performance	Helen Hunt	Twister	Jo Harding
1997; 6th	Female Performance	Madonna	Evita	Eva Peron
1998; 7th	Male Performance	Leonardo DiCaprio	Titanic	Jack Dawson
1998; 7th	Male Performance	Nicolas Cage	Face/Off	Castor Troy
1998; 7th	Male Performance	Matt Damon	Good Will Hunting	Will Hunting
1998; 7th	Male Performance	Samuel L. Jackson	Jackie Brown	Ordell Robbie
1998; 7th	Male Performance	John Travolta	Face/Off	Sean Archer
1998; 7th	Female Performance	Neve Campbell	Scream 2	Sidney Prescott
1998; 7th	Female Performance	Vivica A. Fox	Soul Food	Maxine Chadway
1998; 7th	Female Performance	Helen Hunt	As Good as It Gets	Carol Connelly
1998; 7th	Female Performance	Julia Roberts	My Best Friend's Wedding	Julianne Potters
1998; 7th	Female Performance	Kate Winslet	Titanic	Rose DeWitt Bukater
1999; 8th	Male Performance	Jim Carrey	The Truman Show	Truman Burbank
1999; 8th	Male Performance	Ben Affleck	Armageddon	A.J. Frost
1999; 8th	Male Performance	Tom Hanks	Saving Private Ryan	John Miller
1999; 8th	Male Performance	Adam Sandler	The Waterboy	Bobby Boucher
1999; 8th	Male Performance	Will Smith	Enemy of the State	Robert Dean
1999; 8th	Female Performance	Cameron Diaz	There's Something About Mary	Mary Jensen
1999; 8th	Female Performance	Jennifer Love Hewitt	Can't Hardly Wait	Amanda Beckett
1999; 8th	Female Performance	Jennifer Lopez	Out of Sight	Karen Sisco
1999; 8th	Female Performance	Gwyneth Paltrow	Shakespeare in Love	Viola de Lesseps
1999; 8th	Female Performance	Liv Tyler	Armageddon	Grace Stamper

=== 2000s ===
Year	Category	Actor	Film	Character
2000; 9th	Male Performance	Keanu Reeves	The Matrix	Neo
2000; 9th	Male Performance	Jim Carrey	Man on the Moon	Andy Kaufman
2000; 9th	Male Performance	Ryan Phillippe	Cruel Intentions	Sebastian Valmont
2000; 9th	Male Performance	Adam Sandler	Big Daddy	Sonny Koufax
2000; 9th	Male Performance	Bruce Willis	The Sixth Sense	Dr. Malcolm Crowe
2000; 9th	Female Performance	Sarah Michelle Gellar	Cruel Intentions	Kathryn Merteuil
2000; 9th	Female Performance	Drew Barrymore	Never Been Kissed	Josie Geller
2000; 9th	Female Performance	Neve Campbell	Scream 3	Sidney Prescott
2000; 9th	Female Performance	Ashley Judd	Double Jeopardy	Libby Parsons
2000; 9th	Female Performance	Julia Roberts	Runaway Bride	Maggie Carpenter
2001; 10th	Male Performance	Tom Cruise	Mission: Impossible 2	Ethan Hunt
2001; 10th	Male Performance	Russell Crowe	Gladiator	Maximus
2001; 10th	Male Performance	Omar Epps	Love & Basketball	Quincy McCall
2001; 10th	Male Performance	Mel Gibson	The Patriot	Benjamin Martin
2001; 10th	Male Performance	Tom Hanks	Cast Away	Chuck Noland
2001; 10th	Female Performance	Julia Roberts	Erin Brockovich	Erin Brockovich
2001; 10th	Female Performance	Aaliyah	Romeo Must Die	Trish O'Day
2001; 10th	Female Performance	Kate Hudson	Almost Famous	Penny Lane
2001; 10th	Female Performance	Jennifer Lopez	The Cell	Dr. Catherine Deane
2001; 10th	Female Performance	Julia Stiles	Save the Last Dance	Sara Johnson
2002; 11th	Male Performance	Will Smith	Ali	Muhammad Ali
2002; 11th	Male Performance	Russell Crowe	A Beautiful Mind	John Nash
2002; 11th	Male Performance	Vin Diesel	The Fast and the Furious	Dominic Toretto
2002; 11th	Male Performance	Josh Hartnett	Pearl Harbor	Lieutenant Danny Walker
2002; 11th	Male Performance	Elijah Wood	The Lord of the Rings: The Fellowship of the Ring	Frodo Baggins
2002; 11th	Female Performance	Nicole Kidman	Moulin Rouge!	Satine
2002; 11th	Female Performance	Kate Beckinsale	Pearl Harbor	Nurse Evelyn Johnson
2002; 11th	Female Performance	Halle Berry	Monster's Ball	Leticia Musgrove
2002; 11th	Female Performance	Angelina Jolie	Lara Croft: Tomb Raider	Lara Croft
2002; 11th	Female Performance	Reese Witherspoon	Legally Blonde	Elle Woods
2003; 12th	Male Performance	Eminem	8 Mile	Jimmy "B-Rabbit" Smith
2003; 12th	Male Performance	Vin Diesel	xXx	Xander Cage
2003; 12th	Male Performance	Leonardo DiCaprio	Catch Me If You Can	Frank Abagnale
2003; 12th	Male Performance	Tobey Maguire	Spider-Man	Peter Parker / Spider-Man
2003; 12th	Male Performance	Viggo Mortensen	The Lord of the Rings: The Two Towers	Aragorn
2003; 12th	Female Performance	Kirsten Dunst	Spider-Man	Mary Jane Watson
2003; 12th	Female Performance	Halle Berry	Die Another Day	Jinx
2003; 12th	Female Performance	Kate Hudson	How to Lose a Guy in 10 Days	Andie Anderson
2003; 12th	Female Performance	Queen Latifah	Chicago	Matron Morton
2003; 12th	Female Performance	Reese Witherspoon	Sweet Home Alabama	Melanie Carmichael
2004; 13th	Male Performance	Johnny Depp	Pirates of the Caribbean: The Curse of the Black Pearl	Jack Sparrow
2004; 13th	Male Performance	Jim Caviezel	The Passion of the Christ	Jesus Christ
2004; 13th	Male Performance	Tom Cruise	The Last Samurai	Cpt. Nathan Algren
2004; 13th	Male Performance	Bill Murray	Lost in Translation	Bob Harris
2004; 13th	Male Performance	Adam Sandler	50 First Dates	Henry Roth
2004; 13th	Female Performance	Uma Thurman	Kill Bill: Volume 1	The Bride
2004; 13th	Female Performance	Drew Barrymore	50 First Dates	Lucy Whitmore
2004; 13th	Female Performance	Halle Berry	Gothika	Miranda Grey
2004; 13th	Female Performance	Queen Latifah	Bringing Down the House	Charlene Morton
2004; 13th	Female Performance	Charlize Theron	Monster	Aileen Wuornos
2005; 14th	Male Performance	Leonardo DiCaprio	The Aviator	Howard Hughes
2005; 14th	Male Performance	Matt Damon	The Bourne Supremacy	Jason Bourne
2005; 14th	Male Performance	Jamie Foxx	Ray	Ray Charles
2005; 14th	Male Performance	Brad Pitt	Troy	Achilles
2005; 14th	Male Performance	Will Smith	Hitch	Hitch
2005; 14th	Female Performance	Lindsay Lohan	Mean Girls	Cady Heron
2005; 14th	Female Performance	Rachel McAdams	The Notebook	Allie Hamilton
2005; 14th	Female Performance	Natalie Portman	Garden State	Sam
2005; 14th	Female Performance	Hilary Swank	Million Dollar Baby	Maggie Fitzgerald
2005; 14th	Female Performance	Uma Thurman	Kill Bill: Volume 2	The Bride
2006; 15th	Best Performance (Combined)	Jake Gyllenhaal	Brokeback Mountain	Jack Twist
2006; 15th	Best Performance (Combined)	Steve Carell	The 40-Year-Old Virgin	Andy Stitzer
2006; 15th	Best Performance (Combined)	Terrence Howard	Hustle & Flow	DJay
2006; 15th	Best Performance (Combined)	Rachel McAdams	Red Eye	Lisa Reisert
2006; 15th	Best Performance (Combined)	Joaquin Phoenix	Walk the Line	Johnny Cash
2006; 15th	Best Performance (Combined)	Reese Witherspoon	Walk the Line	June Carter Cash
2007; 16th	Best Performance (Combined)	Johnny Depp	Pirates of the Caribbean: Dead Man's Chest	Jack Sparrow
2007; 16th	Best Performance (Combined)	Gerard Butler	300	Leonidas
2007; 16th	Best Performance (Combined)	Jennifer Hudson	Dreamgirls	Effie White
2007; 16th	Best Performance (Combined)	Keira Knightley	Pirates of the Caribbean: Dead Man's Chest	Elizabeth Swann
2007; 16th	Best Performance (Combined)	Beyoncé	Dreamgirls	Deena Jones
2007; 16th	Best Performance (Combined)	Will Smith	The Pursuit of Happyness	Chris Gardner
2008; 17th	Male Performance	Will Smith	I Am Legend	Robert Neville
2008; 17th	Male Performance	Michael Cera	Juno	Paulie Bleeker
2008; 17th	Male Performance	Matt Damon	The Bourne Ultimatum	Jason Bourne
2008; 17th	Male Performance	Shia LaBeouf	Transformers	Sam Witwicky
2008; 17th	Male Performance	Denzel Washington	American Gangster	Frank Lucas
2008; 17th	Female Performance	Elliot Page	Juno	Juno MacGuff
2008; 17th	Female Performance	Amy Adams	Enchanted	Giselle
2008; 17th	Female Performance	Jessica Biel	I Now Pronounce You Chuck and Larry	Alex McDonough
2008; 17th	Female Performance	Katherine Heigl	Knocked Up	Alison Scott
2008; 17th	Female Performance	Keira Knightley	Pirates of the Caribbean: At World's End	Elizabeth
2009; 18th	Male Performance	Zac Efron	High School Musical 3: Senior Year	Troy Bolton
2009; 18th	Male Performance	Christian Bale	The Dark Knight	Bruce Wayne / Batman
2009; 18th	Male Performance	Vin Diesel	Fast & Furious	Dominic Toretto
2009; 18th	Male Performance	Robert Downey Jr.	Iron Man	Tony Stark / Iron Man
2009; 18th	Male Performance	Shia LaBeouf	Eagle Eye	Jerry & Ethan Shaw
2009; 18th	Female Performance	Kristen Stewart	Twilight	Bella Swan
2009; 18th	Female Performance	Anne Hathaway	Bride Wars	Emma Allen
2009; 18th	Female Performance	Taraji P. Henson	The Curious Case of Benjamin Button	Queenie
2009; 18th	Female Performance	Angelina Jolie	Wanted	Fox
2009; 18th	Female Performance	Kate Winslet	The Reader	Hanna Schmitz

=== 2010s ===
Year	Category	Actor	Film	Character
2010; 19th	Male Performance	Robert Pattinson	The Twilight Saga: New Moon	Edward Cullen
2010; 19th	Male Performance	Zac Efron	17 Again	Mike O'Donnell
2010; 19th	Male Performance	Taylor Lautner	The Twilight Saga: New Moon	Jacob Black
2010; 19th	Male Performance	Daniel Radcliffe	Harry Potter and the Half-Blood Prince	Harry Potter
2010; 19th	Male Performance	Channing Tatum	Dear John	John Tyree
2010; 19th	Female Performance	Kristen Stewart	The Twilight Saga: New Moon	Bella Swan
2010; 19th	Female Performance	Sandra Bullock	The Blind Side	Leigh Anne Tuohy
2010; 19th	Female Performance	Zoe Saldaña	Avatar	Neytiri
2010; 19th	Female Performance	Amanda Seyfried	Dear John	Savannah Lynn Curtis
2010; 19th	Female Performance	Emma Watson	Harry Potter and the Half-Blood Prince	Hermione Granger
2011; 20th	Male Performance	Robert Pattinson	The Twilight Saga: Eclipse	Edward Cullen
2011; 20th	Male Performance	Zac Efron	Charlie St. Cloud	Charlie St. Cloud
2011; 20th	Male Performance	Jesse Eisenberg	The Social Network	Mark Zuckerberg
2011; 20th	Male Performance	Taylor Lautner	The Twilight Saga: Eclipse	Jacob Black
2011; 20th	Male Performance	Daniel Radcliffe	Harry Potter and the Deathly Hallows: Part 1	Harry Potter
2011; 20th	Female Performance	Kristen Stewart	The Twilight Saga: Eclipse	Bella Swan
2011; 20th	Female Performance	Jennifer Aniston	Just Go with It	Katherine Murphy / "Devlin Maccabee"
2011; 20th	Female Performance	Natalie Portman	Black Swan	Nina Sayers
2011; 20th	Female Performance	Emma Stone	Easy A	Olive Penderghast
2011; 20th	Female Performance	Emma Watson	Harry Potter and the Deathly Hallows: Part 1	Hermione Granger
2012; 21st	Male Performance	Josh Hutcherson	The Hunger Games	Peeta Mellark
2012; 21st	Male Performance	Joseph Gordon-Levitt	50/50	Adam Lerner
2012; 21st	Male Performance	Ryan Gosling	Drive	Driver
2012; 21st	Male Performance	Daniel Radcliffe	Harry Potter and the Deathly Hallows: Part 2	Harry Potter
2012; 21st	Male Performance	Channing Tatum	The Vow	Leo Collins
2012; 21st	Female Performance	Jennifer Lawrence	The Hunger Games	Katniss Everdeen
2012; 21st	Female Performance	Rooney Mara	The Girl with the Dragon Tattoo	Lisbeth Salander
2012; 21st	Female Performance	Kristen Wiig	Bridesmaids	Annie Walker
2012; 21st	Female Performance	Emma Stone	Crazy, Stupid, Love	Hannah Weaver
2012; 21st	Female Performance	Emma Watson	Harry Potter and the Deathly Hallows: Part 2	Hermione Granger
2013; 22nd	Male Performance	Bradley Cooper	Silver Linings Playbook	Pat Solitano Jr.
2013; 22nd	Male Performance	Ben Affleck	Argo	Tony Mendez
2013; 22nd	Male Performance	Channing Tatum	Magic Mike	Michael "Magic Mike" Lane
2013; 22nd	Male Performance	Daniel Day-Lewis	Lincoln	Abraham Lincoln
2013; 22nd	Male Performance	Jamie Foxx	Django Unchained	Django
2013; 22nd	Female Performance	Jennifer Lawrence	Silver Linings Playbook	Tiffany Maxwell
2013; 22nd	Female Performance	Anne Hathaway	Les Misérables	Fantine
2013; 22nd	Female Performance	Mila Kunis	Ted	Lori Collins
2013; 22nd	Female Performance	Emma Watson	The Perks of Being a Wallflower	Sam
2013; 22nd	Female Performance	Rebel Wilson	Pitch Perfect	Fat Amy
2014; 23rd	Male Performance	Josh Hutcherson	The Hunger Games: Catching Fire	Peeta Mellark
2014; 23rd	Male Performance	Bradley Cooper	American Hustle	Richie DiMaso
2014; 23rd	Male Performance	Chiwetel Ejiofor	12 Years a Slave	Solomon Northup
2014; 23rd	Male Performance	Leonardo DiCaprio	The Wolf of Wall Street	Jordan Belfort
2014; 23rd	Male Performance	Matthew McConaughey	Dallas Buyers Club	Ron Woodroof
2014; 23rd	Female Performance	Jennifer Lawrence	The Hunger Games: Catching Fire	Katniss Everdeen
2014; 23rd	Female Performance	Amy Adams	American Hustle	Sydney Prosser
2014; 23rd	Female Performance	Jennifer Aniston	We're the Millers	Rose O'Reilly
2014; 23rd	Female Performance	Lupita Nyong'o	12 Years a Slave	Patsey
2014; 23rd	Female Performance	Sandra Bullock	Gravity	Dr. Ryan Stone
2015; 24th	Male Performance	Bradley Cooper	American Sniper	Chris Kyle
2015; 24th	Male Performance	Ansel Elgort	The Fault in Our Stars	Augustus Waters
2015; 24th	Male Performance	Channing Tatum	Foxcatcher	Mark Schultz
2015; 24th	Male Performance	Chris Pratt	Guardians of the Galaxy	Peter Quill / Star-Lord
2015; 24th	Male Performance	Miles Teller	Whiplash	Andrew Neiman
2015; 24th	Female Performance	Shailene Woodley	The Fault in Our Stars	Hazel Grace Lancaster
2015; 24th	Female Performance	Scarlett Johansson	Lucy	Lucy
2015; 24th	Female Performance	Jennifer Lawrence	The Hunger Games: Mockingjay – Part 1	Katniss Everdeen
2015; 24th	Female Performance	Emma Stone	Birdman	Sam Thomson
2015; 24th	Female Performance	Reese Witherspoon	Wild	Cheryl Strayed
2016; 25th	Male Performance	Leonardo DiCaprio	The Revenant	Hugh Glass
2016; 25th	Male Performance	Matt Damon	The Martian	Mark Watney
2016; 25th	Male Performance	Michael B. Jordan	Creed	Donnie Creed
2016; 25th	Male Performance	Chris Pratt	Jurassic World	Owen Grady
2016; 25th	Male Performance	Ryan Reynolds	Deadpool	Wade Wilson / Deadpool
2016; 25th	Male Performance	Will Smith	Concussion	Dr. Bennet Omalu
2016; 25th	Female Performance	Charlize Theron	Mad Max: Fury Road	Imperator Furiosa
2016; 25th	Female Performance	Alicia Vikander	Ex Machina	Ava
2016; 25th	Female Performance	Anna Kendrick	Pitch Perfect 2	Beca Mitchell
2016; 25th	Female Performance	Daisy Ridley	Star Wars: The Force Awakens	Rey
2016; 25th	Female Performance	Jennifer Lawrence	Joy	Joy Mangano
2016; 25th	Female Performance	Morena Baccarin	Deadpool	Vanessa James
2017; 26th	Best Performance (Combined)	Emma Watson	Beauty and the Beast	Belle
2017; 26th	Best Performance (Combined)	Taraji P. Henson	Hidden Figures	Katherine Goble Johnson
2017; 26th	Best Performance (Combined)	Hugh Jackman	Logan	James Howlett / Logan
2017; 26th	Best Performance (Combined)	Daniel Kaluuya	Get Out	Chris Washington
2017; 26th	Best Performance (Combined)	James McAvoy	Split	Kevin Wendell Crumb
2017; 26th	Best Performance (Combined)	Hailee Steinfeld	The Edge of Seventeen	Nadine Franklin
2018; 27th	Best Performance (Combined)	Chadwick Boseman	Black Panther	T'Challa / Black Panther
2018; 27th	Best Performance (Combined)	Timothée Chalamet	Call Me by Your Name	Elio Perlman
2018; 27th	Best Performance (Combined)	Ansel Elgort	Baby Driver	Miles "Baby"
2018; 27th	Best Performance (Combined)	Daisy Ridley	Star Wars: The Last Jedi	Rey
2018; 27th	Best Performance (Combined)	Saoirse Ronan	Lady Bird	Christine "Lady Bird" McPherson
2019; 28th	Best Performance (Combined)	Lady Gaga	A Star Is Born	Ally Maine
2019; 28th	Best Performance (Combined)	Amandla Stenberg	The Hate U Give	Starr Carter
2019; 28th	Best Performance (Combined)	Lupita Nyong'o	Us	Red
2019; 28th	Best Performance (Combined)	Rami Malek	Bohemian Rhapsody	Freddie Mercury
2019; 28th	Best Performance (Combined)	Sandra Bullock	Bird Box	Malorie

=== 2020s ===
Year	Category	Actor	Film	Character	Ref.
2021; 29th	Best Performance (Combined)	Chadwick Boseman	Ma Rainey's Black Bottom	Levee Green	
2021; 29th	Best Performance (Combined)	Sacha Baron Cohen	The Trial of the Chicago 7	Abbie Hoffman	
2021; 29th	Best Performance (Combined)	Daniel Kaluuya	Judas and the Black Messiah	Fred Hampton	
2021; 29th	Best Performance (Combined)	Carey Mulligan	Promising Young Woman	Cassandra "Cassie" Thomas	
2021; 29th	Best Performance (Combined)	Zendaya	Malcolm & Marie	Marie	
2022; 30th	Best Performance (Combined)	Tom Holland	Spider-Man: No Way Home	Peter Parker / Spider-Man	
2022; 30th	Best Performance (Combined)	Lady Gaga	House of Gucci	Patrizia Reggiani	
2022; 30th	Best Performance (Combined)	Robert Pattinson	The Batman	Bruce Wayne / Batman	
2022; 30th	Best Performance (Combined)	Sandra Bullock	The Lost City	Loretta Sage	
2022; 30th	Best Performance (Combined)	Timothée Chalamet	Dune	Paul Atreides	
2023; 31st	Best Performance (Combined)	Tom Cruise	Top Gun: Maverick	Pete "Maverick" Mitchell	
2023; 31st	Best Performance (Combined)	Austin Butler	Elvis	Elvis Presley	
2023; 31st	Best Performance (Combined)	Florence Pugh	Don't Worry Darling	Alice	
2023; 31st	Best Performance (Combined)	Keke Palmer	Nope	Emerald "Em" Haywood	
2023; 31st	Best Performance (Combined)	Michael B. Jordan	Creed III	Adonis "Donnie" Creed	

== Multiple wins and nominations ==
The following individuals received two or more awards:

Wins	Actors
3	Tom Cruise
3	Leonardo DiCaprio
3	Jennifer Lawrence
3	Kristen Stewart
2	Chadwick Boseman
2	Jim Carrey
2	Bradley Cooper
2	Johnny Depp
2	Josh Hutcherson
2	Robert Pattinson
2	Will Smith

The following individuals received 4 or more nominations:

Nominations	Actor
7	Sandra Bullock
7	Will Smith
6	Tom Cruise
6	Leonardo DiCaprio
5	Tom Hanks
5	Jennifer Lawrence
5	Julia Roberts
5	Emma Watson
4	Matt Damon
4	Robert Pattinson
4	Channing Tatum
4	Reese Witherspoon
