= Stole My Heart =

"Stole My Heart" may refer to:

- Stole My Heart (One Direction song), 2011
- "Stole My Heart", a song by Megha from the 2010 Indian film Singam
- "Dil Chura Liya" (lit. 'Stole My Heart'), a song by Abhijeet Bhattacharya and Kavita Krishnamurthy from the 2003 Indian film Qayamat: City Under Threat
- "Dil Luitya" (lit. 'Stole My Heart'), a bhangra song by Indian-Canadian singer Jazzy B
