= Douglas Cook =

Douglas Cook may refer to:

- William Douglas Cook (1884–1967), founder of Eastwoodhill Arboretum, now the national arboretum of New Zealand
- Douglas S. Cook (1958/9–2015), American screenwriter
