= Holy Matrimony (1994 film) =

1994 film by Leonard Nimoy

- Theatrical release poster
- Directed by: Leonard Nimoy
- Written by: David Weisberg; Douglas Cook
- Produced by: William Stuart; David Madden; Diane Nabatoff
- Starring: Patricia Arquette; Joseph Gordon-Levitt; Tate Donovan; Armin Mueller-Stahl
- Cinematography: Bobby Bukowski
- Edited by: Peter E. Berger
- Music by: Bruce Broughton
- Production companies: Hollywood Pictures; Interscope Communications; PolyGram Filmed Entertainment
- Distributed by: Buena Vista Pictures Distribution (North America); PolyGram Filmed Entertainment (international)
- Release date: April 8, 1994
- Running time: 93 minutes
- Country: United States
- Language: English
- Budget: $16 million
- Box office: $713,234

Holy Matrimony is a 1994 American comedy film directed by Leonard Nimoy and starring Patricia Arquette and Joseph Gordon-Levitt. The film tells the story of a beautiful thief, hiding in a small, isolated Hutterite community, who marries a young boy in order to retrieve a hidden fortune following the death of her boyfriend, who was also the older brother of her current husband. It was the final feature film directed by Nimoy.

== Plot ==
A young couple, Havana and Peter, robs a county fair of its daily receipts and escapes to Canada to hide out in the Hutterite community where Peter was raised.

While there, they marry to satisfy the conservative elders in the community. Peter hides their loot but then is killed in a car wreck. His much younger brother Zeke is called upon to replace his brother and marry Havana in a levirate marriage.

Zeke already hates Havana because he believes that she influences his elder brother's behavior. She begins looking through everything that was Peter's, and Zeke rightly deduces that Peter hid something from her. He finds the money, along with a newspaper article that mentions Peter as the prime suspect in the robbery.

Zeke initially uses the cash to trick his bride into doing housework. Later he shows it to the elders, who deem that it should be returned to its rightful owners. Zeke and Havana (who claims innocence of the source of the money) are sent on a quest back to the US to return the money.

During this quest, the two eventually forget their initial animosity and grow protective of each other. When Havana kisses him goodbye, Zeke promises to return and give her a real kiss when he is older.

== Cast ==
- Patricia Arquette as Betsy "Havana" Iggins
- Joseph Gordon-Levitt as Ezekiel "Zeke" Jacobson
- Tate Donovan as Peter Jacobson
- John Schuck as Markowski
- Lois Smith as Orna Jacobson
- Courtney Vance as Cooper
- Armin Mueller-Stahl as Wilhelm Jacobson
- Jeffrey Nordling as Link
- Richard Riehle as Greeson
- Mary Pat Gleason as Female Officer
- Alaine Byrne as Bar Woman
- Dan Cossolini as Bartender
- Lori Alan as Cleopatra
- Jess Schwidde as Samuel
- Franz Novak as Teacher

== Reception ==
Holy Matrimony received negative reviews from critics and was a box office failure, grossing just a little over $713,000 in its limited release.

The authors Rod Janzen and Max Stanton stated in their book The Hutterites in North America: "The film [...] provides a very inaccurate portrait of Hutterites". For example, levirate marriage does not exist among Hutterites. People have to dress in a moderate way when they are at a Hutterite colony. It is only possible for baptized members of the Hutterite community to marry at a colony. On Rotten Tomatoes, the film has a score of 0% based on 8 critic reviews.

== Year-end lists ==
- 7th worst – Sean P. Means, The Salt Lake Tribune
- Worst films (not ranked) – Jeff Simon, The Buffalo News
- Worst films (not ranked) – Bob Ross, The Tampa Tribune
