= Criminal (2016 film) =

2016 film by Ariel Vromen

- Theatrical release poster
- Directed by: Ariel Vromen
- Written by: Douglas Cook; David Weisberg
- Produced by: J. C. Spink; Jake Weiner; Mark Gill; Matt O'Toole; Christa Campbell
- Starring: Kevin Costner; Gary Oldman; Tommy Lee Jones; Antje Traue; Gal Gadot; Alice Eve; Michael Pitt; Jordi Mollà; Scott Adkins; Amaury Nolasco
- Cinematography: Dana Gonzales
- Edited by: Danny Rafic
- Music by: Brian Tyler; Keith Power
- Production companies: Summit Entertainment; Millennium Films; BenderSpink; Campbell-Grobman Films
- Distributed by: Lionsgate
- Release date: April 15, 2016 (United States)
- Running time: 109 minutes
- Country: United States
- Language: English
- Budget: $31.5 million
- Box office: $38.8 million

Criminal is a 2016 American action thriller film directed by Ariel Vromen and written by Douglas Cook and David Weisberg. The film is about a convict who is implanted with a dead CIA agent's memories to finish an assignment. The film stars Kevin Costner, Gary Oldman, and Tommy Lee Jones, in the second collaboration among all three following the 1991 film JFK. The film also features Gal Gadot and Antje Traue with the death of Ryan Reynolds' character, early in the film, setting the plot in motion.

Principal photography began on September 4, 2014, in London. The film was produced by Campbell-Grobman Films and Millennium Films and was released on April 15, 2016. It received generally negative reviews from critics and was a financial disappointment, grossing $38.8 million against its $31.5 million budget.

== Plot ==
Spanish industrialist-turned-anarchist Xavier Heimdahl arranges for his associate Jan Strook—a hacker known as "the Dutchman"—to create a wormhole program that would allow the owner to bypass all computer codes protecting the world's nuclear defense codes. The Dutchman panics and attempts to hand his secret over to CIA agent Bill Pope. Although Pope gets the Dutchman to a safe house and recovers the money to pay him for his services, he is caught by Heimdahl's men and tortured to death before he can tell anyone where he hid the Dutchman.

Desperate to find the Dutchman, Pope's supervisor Quaker Wells contacts Dr. Micah Franks, who has developed a treatment that could theoretically plant the memory patterns of a dead person onto a living one. Franks requests that they "graft" Pope's knowledge into the brain of convict Jerico Stewart, who received damage in his frontal lobe by being abused as a child and is effectively a sociopath.

After the operation, Jerico escapes custody and fakes his death. He steals a maintenance van and goes to Pope's house, where he holds Pope's widow Jillian hostage while he looks for the money. As time goes on, he experiences memory flashes of Pope's past, but all he can determine is that the bag of money was hidden behind a bookshelf, without identifying where it or the Dutchman is kept.

The CIA learns that the Dutchman is planning to sell the program to the Russians, believing that the CIA has betrayed him. Fortunately, they are able to find Jerico after he contacts Dr. Franks for medication using Pope's CIA codes. Jerico is beginning to develop emotions and draw on Pope's experience. As Jerico attempts to retrace the route Pope took to hide the Dutchman, Heimdahl creates a distraction at the airport that draws Wells' attention, allowing Heimdahl's accomplice and lover Elsa to try and capture Jerico, killing his CIA guards before Jerico escapes by driving a taxi off a bridge.

Jerico retreats to the Popes' house, where he encounters Jillian and explains the situation to her. Although she initially fears him, Jillian comes to accept Jerico as she sees him bonding with her daughter, Emma, allowing Jerico to stay the night. The next morning, Jerico realizes through a conversation with Jillian that the bag is hidden in the rare books collection at the University of London where she works. He attempts to retrieve the bag but is captured by Heimdahl and Elsa once he has found it. Heimdahl threatens to kill Jillian and Emma unless Jerico takes him to the Dutchman.

With the CIA and a Russian strike team now seeking the Dutchman, Jerico, who has now recalled that Pope hid the Dutchman in Jillian's office at the university, escapes Elsa using an improvised nitro-glycerine bomb, returning to the office to provide a hurried explanation to the Dutchman. Elsa finds them before they can escape, shooting Jerico in the shoulder and killing the Dutchman, but Jerico gets the upper hand and bludgeons her to death with a lamp.

Jerico steals an ambulance and takes the flash drive containing the wormhole program to the airfield where Heimdahl is attempting an escape. Jerico saves Jillian and Emma, even as Heimdahl shoots him. As Heimdahl's plane takes off, Jerico reveals to Wells that he had the Dutchman reprogram the wormhole so that it would target the source of the next transmission. This results in Heimdahl unwittingly destroying his own plane when he tries to fire a missile at the airfield.

A few months later, Jerico is shown on the beach where Pope and Jillian had their honeymoon. He is initially unresponsive to anything but automatic reflexes and responses. With all other options exhausted, Wells and Franks take Jillian and Emma to see him. The sight of Pope's family confirms that some part of Pope exists in Jerico as he responds with a nose-tap. This was Pope and Jillian's way of saying "I love you". Witnessing this, Quaker reflects that he will offer Jerico a job.

== Cast ==
- Kevin Costner as Jerico Stewart
- Gary Oldman as Quaker Wells
- Tommy Lee Jones as Dr. Franks
- Gal Gadot as Jill Pope
- Antje Traue as Elsa Mueller
- Alice Eve as Marta Lynch
- Michael Pitt as Jan Strook - The Dutchman
- Jordi Mollà as Xavier Heimdahl
- Scott Adkins as Pete Greensleeves
- Amaury Nolasco as Esteban Ruiza
- Danny Webb as Lewis Dean
- Colin Salmon as the Warden

In addition, Ryan Reynolds has a cameo appearance in the opening minutes of the film – as CIA agent Bill Pope. Lara Decaro appears as Pope's daughter Emma.

== Production ==
=== Development ===
On June 20, 2013, it was announced that Millennium Films had acquired the script for Criminal, written by Douglas Cook and David Weisberg, an action film in which a dead CIA operative's memories, secrets, and skills are implanted into a dangerous criminal, who is sent on a government mission. J.C. Spink, Chris Bender, Matt O'Toole and Mark Gill were initially announced as producers, with Boaz Davidson later joining the production. On September 13, Millennium set Ariel Vromen to direct the film.

=== Casting ===
On June 17, 2014, Kevin Costner was cast to play a dangerous criminal with a dead CIA operative's skills, secrets, and memories implanted into him to finish a job. On July 10, Gary Oldman was in talks to join the film to play the CIA chief. On July 23, Tommy Lee Jones joined the film to play a neuroscientist who transplants the memories to the criminal, while Oldman's role was also confirmed. On August 4, Ryan Reynolds was added to the cast. On August 7, Alice Eve joined the cast. On August 11, Jordi Mollà joined the film in the villain role of Hagbardaka Heimdahl, who wants the dead CIA agent's secrets now implanted in the criminal's brain. On August 12, Gal Gadot signed on to star in the film as Reynolds' character's wife. On September 26, Antje Traue joined the film to play the villain's accomplice.

=== Filming ===
Principal photography on the film began on September 4, 2014, in London. Some actors and crews were also spotted filming scenes for the film on King's Road in Kingston. From September 22–25, filming was taking place in Yateley, Hampshire, where actors were spotted filming car crashes and helicopter chase scenes at the Blackbushe Airport. Filming was also done in Croydon College in Croydon, with the college building used as medical research labs and the CIA operations centre. In October 2014, Connect 2 Cleanrooms installed a cleanroom in Surrey Quays Road, London, for the scene where Tommy Lee Jones' character operates on Kevin Costner's. On October 23, aerial drone filming was undertaken featuring Costner in a car chase scene on White's Row in East London. Some filming also took place at the SOAS - School of Oriental & African Studies University of London library, taking advantage of the brutalist architecture and the amazing visuals of the 6 floors of the academic research library. Filming also took place at Pinewood Studios.

=== Music ===
On December 9, 2014, it was announced that Haim Mazar had signed on to compose the music of the film. However, on June 10, 2015, it was announced that Brian Tyler and Keith Power had taken over scoring duties on the film, replacing Mazar.

== Release ==
The film was to be released on January 22, 2016, in the United States, but in August 2015 the release was pushed back to April 15, 2016.

== Reception ==
=== Box office ===
Criminal grossed $14.7 million domestically (United States and Canada), and $24.1 million in other territories, for a worldwide total of $38.8 million, against a budget of $31.5 million.

In the United States and Canada, the film was released alongside The Jungle Book and Barbershop: The Next Cut, and was projected to gross $9–12 million from 2,683 theaters in its opening weekend. The film ended up grossing just $5.8 million in its opening weekend, below expectations and among the worst wide-release openings of Costner's career, finishing 6th at the box office.

=== Critical response ===
On the review aggregator website Rotten Tomatoes, 30% of 137 critics' reviews are positive, with an average rating of 4.4/10. The website's consensus reads: "Despite the valiant efforts of a game and talented cast, Criminal has little to offer beyond the bare minimum expected by the most undemanding of genre enthusiasts." Metacritic, which uses a weighted average, assigned the film a score of 36 out of 100, based on 27 critics, indicating "generally unfavorable" reviews. Audiences polled by CinemaScore gave the film an average grade of "B−" on an A+ to F scale.

In his review, Empire magazine's John Nugent wrote: "We can but pray that scientists invent a procedure to remove the memory of ever watching this film in the first place", and awarded the film 1 star out of 5. Writing for The Daily Telegraph, Tim Robey called it "wanton, low-down entertainment" and awarded it 2 stars out of 5. In his review for BBC, Mark Kermode placed it in fifth place in his mid-year list of the Worst Films of 2016.
