= Dangerous Minds =

1995 American drama film directed by John N. Smith

- Theatrical release poster
- Directed by: John N. Smith
- Screenplay by: Ronald Bass
- Based on: My Posse Don't Do Homework by LouAnne Johnson
- Produced by: Don Simpson; Jerry Bruckheimer
- Starring: Michelle Pfeiffer; George Dzundza
- Cinematography: Pierre Letarte
- Edited by: Tom Rolf
- Music by: Wendy & Lisa
- Production companies: Hollywood Pictures; Don Simpson/Jerry Bruckheimer Films
- Distributed by: Buena Vista Pictures Distribution
- Release date: August 11, 1995
- Running time: 99 minutes
- Country: United States
- Language: English
- Budget: $23 million
- Box office: $179.5 million

Dangerous Minds is a 1995 American drama film directed by John N. Smith, written by Ronald Bass, and produced by Don Simpson and Jerry Bruckheimer. It is based on the 1992 autobiography My Posse Don't Do Homework by retired U.S. Marine LouAnne Johnson, who in 1989 took up a teaching position at Carlmont High School in Belmont, California, where most of her students were African-American and Latino teenagers from East Palo Alto, a racially segregated and economically deprived city. Michelle Pfeiffer stars as Johnson. Critical reviews were mixed, with some critics praising Pfeiffer's performance but criticizing the screenplay as contrived and full of stereotypes. The film grossed $179.5 million and spawned a short-lived television series.

== Plot ==
LouAnne Johnson, a veteran of the U.S. Navy and Marine Corps, applies for a high school teaching job and is surprised and pleased to be offered the position with immediate effect, even though it is a low paying job. Showing up the next day to begin teaching, however, she finds herself confronted with a classroom of tough, sullen teenagers, all from low-income working-class backgrounds, involved in gang warfare and drug pushing, flatly refusing to engage with anything.

They immediately coin the nickname "White Bread" for LouAnne, due to her race and apparent lack of authority, to which LouAnne responds by returning the next day in a leather jacket and teaching them karate. The students show some interest in such activities, but withdraw when LouAnne tries to teach the curriculum.

Desperate to reach the students, LouAnne devises classroom exercises that teach similar principles to the prescribed work but using themes and language that appeal to the students. She also tries to motivate them by giving them all an A grade from the beginning of the year and arguing that the only thing required of them is that they maintain it.

In order to introduce them to poetry, LouAnne uses the lyrics of Bob Dylan's "Mr. Tambourine Man" to teach symbolism and metaphor; once this is achieved, she progresses on to Dylan Thomas's "Do not go gentle into that good night", inspired by a conversation with her co-worker Hal Griffith about his favorite poet, confusing Bob Dylan (his reply) with Dylan Thomas. LouAnne rewards the students liberally, using candy bars, reward incentives, and a trip to a theme park. Her methods draw the attention of the school authorities, George Grandey and Carla Nichols, who try to force her to remain within the curriculum.

A few particular students attract LouAnne's interest for their personal problems. Raul Sanchero is a boy who is frequently involved in gang warfare and street crime. LouAnne tries to encourage him to focus by paying a special visit to his family to congratulate him on his work and going to dinner with him as a way of instilling confidence and self-respect.

Emilio Ramirez is her most troublesome personal "project", as he believes strongly in a sense of personal honor that prevents him from asking for help. When LouAnne discovers that his life is in danger because of a personal grudge held by a recently released thug, she advises him to seek help from Principal George Grandey. The next day, Emilio visits Grandey, but Grandey (not realizing that Emilio is in serious danger) instantly dismisses him because he neglected to knock on the door before entering his office.

Feeling rejected, Emilio leaves the school and is subsequently killed by his rival. Heartbroken by her failure to protect Emilio and angry at the indifferent school system for contributing to his death, LouAnne announces to the class her intention to leave the school at the end of the academic year. The students immediately break down, begging her not to leave. Overwhelmed by their unbridled display of emotion, she decides to stay.

== Cast ==
- Michelle Pfeiffer as LouAnne Johnson
- George Dzundza as Hal Griffith
- Courtney B. Vance as George Grandey
- Robin Bartlett as Carla Nichols
- Bruklin Harris as Callie Roberts
- Renoly Santiago as Raul Sanchero
- Wade Dominguez as Emilio Ramirez
- Beatrice Winde as Mary Benton
- Lorraine Toussaint as Irene Roberts
- John Neville as Waiter
- Marcello Thedford as Cornelius Bates
- Roberto Alvarez as Gusmaro Rivera
- Richard Grant as Durrell Benton
- Marisela Gonzalez as Angela
- Norris Young as Kareem
- Karina Arroyave as Josy
- Paula Garcés as Alvina
- Raymond Grant as Lionel Benton
- Ivan Sergei as "Huero"
- Gaura Vani as "Warlock" (credited as Gaura Buchwald)
- Cynthia Avila as Mrs. Sanchero
- Roman Cisneros as Mr. Sanchero
- Camille Winbush as Tyeisha Roberts
- Al Israel as Mr. Santiego

== Production ==
Dangerous Minds was one of the last films of producer Don Simpson. The school at which LouAnne Johnson taught, Carlmont High School in Belmont, California, was considered as a filming location, but Burlingame High School in Burlingame was used as the filming location for all the outside scenes, and some indoor scenes filmed at neighboring San Mateo High School. Most of the filming was done at Warner Hollywood Studios in Burbank, California.

The amusement park scene was done in Santa Cruz, California, at the Santa Cruz Beach Boardwalk. Additional photography was also done in Pacoima, Monrovia, Glendale, and Sherman Oaks.

Producer Jerry Bruckheimer revealed that Dangerous Minds faced significant challenges during post-production, beginning with a disastrous test screening. "We did a preview, and I'm telling you, maybe 10 people were left in the audience," Bruckheimer recalled in a 2024 interview with Deadline. Following this poor reception, the filmmakers spent nearly a year reworking the film, including changes in editing and tone. A major turning point was the inclusion of Coolio featuring L.V.'s "Gangsta's Paradise", which not only anchored the film thematically but also became a cultural phenomenon, helping drive the movie's eventual commercial success. Bruckheimer emphasized the importance of music in filmmaking, comparing its role in Dangerous Minds to that of "Flashdance... What a Feeling" by Irene Cara in Flashdance (1983).

== Release ==
=== Box office ===
Dangerous Minds was released in the United States on August 11, 1995. It grossed a total of $179.5 million worldwide.

=== Critical reception ===
Dangerous Minds received mixed reviews upon release. Rotten Tomatoes gives the film an approval score of 36% and an average rating of 4.9/10 based on 45 reviews from critics. The website's "Critics Consensus" for the film reads, "Rife with stereotypes that undermine its good intentions, Dangerous Minds is too blind to see that the ones it hurts are the audience." Metacritic, which uses a weighted average, assigned the film a score of 46 out of 100, based on 18 critics, indicating "mixed or average" reviews. Writer Aisha Harris attributed the film's poor reception to film critics having grown tired of the "inspirational teacher" that had been prevalent throughout the 1990s by the time Dangerous Minds was released.

Janet Maslin of The New York Times called it a "false and condescending film" that "steamrollers its way over some real talent". Although praising Michelle Pfeiffer's acting ability, Maslin said that the script limits her to a one-dimension role. Kenneth Turan's review for the Los Angeles Times said that Pfeiffer "is as believable as the film allows her to be", but the film trivializes the subject matter. Roger Ebert wrote in his review for the Chicago Sun-Times called the film "less than compelling" and said the true story had been watered down to appeal to white audiences, illustrated by the substitution of Bob Dylan songs for rap songs. Though Terrence Rafferty of The New Yorker said Pfeiffer's acting made the film "fairly entertaining", he criticized the film's screenplay and the sentimental ending, which he said gives Pfeiffer's character an unnecessary halo. Peter Travers in Rolling Stone described the young cast as "outstanding" and praised Pfeiffer's performance, but he said the film "often unspools like a hokey update of Sidney Poitier's To Sir, with Love". Kevin McManus of The Washington Post also praised the acting, though he wrote that the film "merits only a C", in part because of the script's lack of subtlety and the saccharine lines given to the students. Edward Guthmann in the San Francisco Chronicle wrote: "It's contrived, it's hokey, but in Dangerous Minds, a Michelle Pfeiffer vehicle, it works surprisingly well... She's playing with a bag of clichés, but she's so plucky and likable, you overlook the hokum." Time Out wrote: "Actually it's quite a respectable piece of work, with an impressive tough-love performance from Pfeiffer, but Ronald Bass's hackneyed screenplay is all carrot and no stick."

Audiences polled by CinemaScore gave the film an average grade of "A-" on an A+ to F scale.

=== Accolades ===
The soundtrack and its lead single "Gangsta's Paradise" enjoyed major success and received nominations for the Grammy Award for Record of the Year and the NAACP Image Award for Outstanding Soundtrack Album. Coolio won the Grammy Award for Best Rap Solo Performance for his vocals.

At the 1996 MTV Movie Awards, Dangerous Minds was nominated in four categories: Best Movie, Best Female Performance (Michelle Pfeiffer), Most Desirable Female (Michelle Pfeiffer) and Best Movie Song (Coolio).

The music video for "Gangsta's Paradise", featuring Michelle Pfeiffer, won the MTV Video Music Award for Best Rap Video and the MTV Video Music Award for Best Video from a Film.

Michelle Pfeiffer won the Blockbuster Entertainment Award for Favorite Actress – Drama.

Awarding Body	Award	Nominee	Result
Blockbuster Entertainment Awards	Favorite Actress - Drama	Michelle Pfeiffer	Won
Grammy Awards	Record of the Year	"Gangsta's Paradise" by Coolio	Nominated
Grammy Awards	Best Rap Solo Performance	"Gangsta's Paradise" by Coolio	Won
NAACP Image Awards	Outstanding Soundtrack Album		Nominated
MTV Movie Awards	Best Movie		Nominated
MTV Movie Awards	Best Female Performance	Michelle Pfeiffer	Nominated
MTV Movie Awards	Most Desirable Female	Michelle Pfeiffer	Nominated
MTV Movie Awards	Best Movie Song	"Gangsta's Paradise" by Coolio	Nominated
MTV Video Music Awards	Best Rap Video	"Gangsta's Paradise" by Coolio	Won
MTV Video Music Awards	Best Video from a Film	"Gangsta's Paradise" by Coolio	Won

The film is recognized by American Film Institute in these lists:

- 2004: AFI's 100 Years...100 Songs:
  - "Gangsta's Paradise" – Nominated

== Soundtrack ==
Year	Title	Chart positions		Certifications (sales thresholds)
Year	Title	U.S.	U.S. R&B	Certifications (sales thresholds)
1995	Dangerous Minds: Released: August 10, 1995; Label: MCA	1	1	US: 3× Platinum

== Television series ==
The commercial success of the film prompted the creation of a spin-off television series, Dangerous Minds, featuring Annie Potts in the role of LouAnne Johnson. The series premiered on ABC on September 30, 1996, and ended on March 15, 1997, after one season of seventeen episodes.

== See also ==
- Stand and Deliver
- To Sir, with Love
- Freedom Writers
- List of teachers portrayed in films
- List of hood films
