= Don Simpson =

American film producer, screenwriter and actor (1943–1996)

- Born: Donald Clarence Simpson; October 29, 1943; Seattle, Washington, U.S.
- Died: January 19, 1996 (aged 52); Los Angeles, California, U.S.
- Education: University of Oregon (BS)
- Occupations: Film producer; screenwriter; actor
- Years active: 1975–1996
- Notable work: Flashdance; Beverly Hills Cop; Top Gun; The Rock

Donald Clarence Simpson (October 29, 1943 – January 19, 1996) was an American film producer, screenwriter, and actor, known for his work on blockbuster films of the 1980s and 1990s. Simpson entered the film industry in the 1970s and worked at Warner Bros. and Paramount Pictures. He eventually began a professional partnership with Jerry Bruckheimer, and together, they produced hit films such as Flashdance (1983), Beverly Hills Cop (1984), Top Gun (1986), and The Rock (1996), the latter released posthumously. As his stature in Hollywood grew, Simpson became notorious for his debauched lifestyle, which included severe and longstanding substance abuse, and he ultimately died from heart failure caused by an overdose of cocaine and prescription drugs. By the time of his death, his and Bruckheimer's films had grossed over $3 billion worldwide.

== Early life ==
Simpson was born in Seattle, Washington, to June Hazel (née Clark), a housewife, and Russell J. Simpson, a mechanic at Boeing at the time of his son's birth. He grew up in Anchorage, Alaska. His parents were strict Baptists and Simpson would go to church four to five times a week. He would call himself a "straight-A Bible student". He attended West Anchorage High School and later majored in English at the University of Oregon. Upon graduation, Simpson worked as a ski instructor in Utah. He later moved to San Francisco where he worked for a theatrical advertising agency and did public relations for the First International Erotic Film Festival.

== Career ==
=== 1970s and 1980s: Paramount Studios ===
In the early 1970s, Simpson started working for Jack Wodell & Associates in San Francisco before moving to Los Angeles. He got a job marketing exploitation films for Warner Bros. in 1972, handling distribution marketing for the movies Woodstock and A Clockwork Orange.

In 1975 Simpson went into an interview with Paramount Pictures. He was referred by his friend Steve Tisch, nephew of Larry Tisch (who later owned CBS and Westinghouse), for the job Steve Tisch turned down. Steve Tisch would later go on to produce Risky Business, Forrest Gump and more. Jerry Bruckheimer, who was already friends with Simpson, loaned his personal car to Simpson to drive to the interview.

While there, he co-wrote the 1976 film Cannonball, in which he also had a small role. By 1977, he was named vice-president of production at Paramount, and president in 1981. He was fired from Paramount in 1982 after passing out during a studio meeting due to drug use. He was working on eight productions at once and had become known for an explosive temper, regularly "throwing tantrums" during production.

Soon after, he forged a production partnership with Bruckheimer. The two would go on to produce some of the most financially successful films of the 1980s: Flashdance (1983), Beverly Hills Cop (1984), Top Gun (1986) and Beverly Hills Cop II (1987). In 1985 and again in 1988, he and Bruckheimer were named Producers of the Year by the National Association of Theatre Owners. The success of Flashdance prompted Simpson and Bruckheimer to launch their own production company that was affiliated with Paramount Pictures.

=== 1990s ===
In 1990, Simpson and Bruckheimer signed a five-year deal with Paramount worth a reported $300 million. The deal would prove to be short lived. Later that year, the Simpson/Bruckheimer-produced Days of Thunder, an auto-racing film starring Tom Cruise, was released. The film received mixed reviews and grossed $158 million (on a $60 million budget). While a financial success, it did not match the success of Simpson and Bruckheimer's previous films. Simpson and Bruckheimer blamed Paramount for the film's lackluster box-office returns, saying the studio rushed its planning and release. Paramount blamed the film's performance on Simpson and Bruckheimer's overspending. The duo parted with Paramount shortly thereafter.

In 1991, the two signed with Disney. Their first film for Disney, The Ref (1994), was a financial flop. Their next films, Dangerous Minds, Crimson Tide, and Bad Boys (distributed by Columbia Pictures rather than Disney), all released in 1995, returned them to success.

== Personal life ==
Simpson never married. In the 1970s, he took classes to join the Church of Scientology but quit after spending $25,000 and not seeing any significant personal improvements. During the shooting of Days of Thunder, Simpson threw Scientology leader David Miscavige off the production after Simpson refused to pay for a more expensive Scientology-patented sound recording device.

=== Personality ===
Simpson was known for his brash personality, provocative comments and questionable claims. Of director Steven Spielberg, Simpson said, "I'm surprised for a smart Jew he's as white-bread as he is." He later said, "Any person who suggested David Lynch for Dune should have every part of their anatomy examined." He said several times that, as a producer, "our obligation is to make money". Simpson worked out every day with special equipment provided by Arnold Schwarzenegger.

Simpson claimed he discovered Michael Mann, launched Debra Winger's career and cast Richard Gere for American Gigolo. He also claimed he created the concept for Beverly Hills Cop, which Michael Eisner denied. In the movie industry, professionals working with Simpson would refer to the "Don Simpson Discount Factor" (DSDF, coined by Jeff Katzenberg), a way to tone down his exaggerations.

According to director Robert Altman, Simpson opposed the proposed casting of Shelley Duvall as Olive Oyl for the project Popeye by standing up at a 1979 meeting of studio executives and saying, "Well, I wouldn't want to fuck her. And if I don't want to fuck her, she shouldn't be in the movie."

Due to their films' success, Simpson and Bruckheimer became very rich. They often dressed in similar clothing, choosing black as their signature color. Simpson would wear black Levi 501 jeans only before their first wash and then throw them away. He frequented the Canyon Ranch in Arizona for occasional workouts and tanning. Though Simpson claimed he never underwent any plastic surgery procedures, there are reports that he underwent ten different plastic surgeries between 1988 and 1994, including a penis-enlargement procedure. Those surgeries eventually led to infection and many reversal procedures.

As Simpson and Bruckheimer's success grew, so did Simpson's reputation as a "party animal". He said that "next to eating and having sex, making movies is the best thing in the world". Simpson's debauched lifestyle was well known in Hollywood and has been documented in a number of sources. He was a fixture on the "Hollywood cocaine-party" circuit throughout the 1970s and '80s, and in his later years became known for throwing lavish all-night parties at his mansion. An entire chapter of the book You'll Never Make Love in This Town Again (which describes four prostitutes' stories about their sexual encounters with Hollywood celebrities) discusses his frequent sex parties and preference for S & M. He also gave himself testosterone shots to boost his sex drive. According to the call girl Alexandra Datig, Simpson auditioned struggling actresses for his movies, convinced them to have sex with him, and secretly filmed their sex acts.

=== Drug addiction ===
Simpson had been using cocaine since the 1970s, but increased his usage over the years. The excessive spending (in both films and his personal life) and erratic mood swings caused by his drug use were well known in Hollywood by the 1990s. In a 1994 interview with The New York Times, Simpson tried to downplay his reputation and claimed that while he had done drugs in the past, he had stopped. He claimed that his only addiction at the time was food. According to screenwriter James Toback, Simpson's drug use never stopped, and prompted David Geffen and Jeffrey Katzenberg to stage an intervention to get Simpson to go to rehab.

Simpson refused to admit himself into a traditional rehab facility. In 1995, he employed a doctor named Stephen Ammerman to help him with his addiction. Ammerman, who had a history of drug abuse himself, believed that in order for Simpson to quit drugs, he had to use other drugs to combat the painful withdrawal symptoms. Ammerman designed what has been called a "dangerously unorthodox" detox program, which included several medications (including morphine) for Simpson to take at home. In August 1995, Ammerman died at Simpson's residence, from what was later determined to be an accidental overdose of cocaine, Valium, venlafaxine, and morphine.

Frustrated with Simpson's escalating drug use and declining work, Bruckheimer terminated their partnership in December 1995. The two agreed to finish work on The Rock, which was already in production. Simpson died before production was completed, and the film is dedicated to his memory.

== Death ==
On January 19, 1996, Simpson was found dead in the bathroom of his Bel Air, Los Angeles, home. His death was initially attributed to "natural causes". An autopsy and toxicology report later determined that Simpson had died of heart failure caused by combined drug intoxication (cocaine and prescription medications). At the time of his death, there were 21 different drugs in his system, including antidepressants, stimulants, sedatives, and tranquilizers. In August 1996, investigative reporter Chuck Philips of the Los Angeles Times revealed that Simpson had been obtaining large quantities of prescription drugs from 15 different doctors, and that police found 2,200 prescription pills lined up in alphabetical order in his bedroom closet.

A 1998 book by journalist Charles Fleming reported that Simpson's prescription drug expenses totaled more than $60,000 a month at the time of his death. He called Simpson "a supercharged simple-minded creature, an Aesop's fable on crystal meth".

After his death, his brother Lary Simpson ran a production company to develop projects, including several Don Simpson had originated, from 1997 until his own death in Noank, Connecticut, on January 25, 2023, at the age of 77.

== Filmography ==
He was a producer in all films unless otherwise noted.

=== Film ===
Year	Film	Credit	Notes
1983	Flashdance		
1984	Beverly Hills Cop		
1984	Thief of Hearts		
1986	Top Gun		
1987	Beverly Hills Cop II	also executive producer on the film's soundtrack	
1990	Days of Thunder		
1994	The Ref	Executive producer	
1995	Bad Boys		
1995	Crimson Tide		
1995	Dangerous Minds		Final film as a producer
1996	The Rock		Posthumous release

As an actor

Year	Film	Role
1976	Cannonball	Assistant District Attorney
1990	Days of Thunder	Aldo Benedetti

As writer

Year	Film	Notes
1975	Aloha, Bobby and Rose	Uncredited
1976	Cannonball	

=== Television ===
Year	Title	Credit
1996	Dangerous Minds	Executive producer

=== Posthumous credits ===
Year	Title	Credit
2003	Bad Boys II	As Don Simpson/Jerry Bruckheimer Films
2020	Bad Boys for Life	As Don Simpson/Jerry Bruckheimer Films
2022	Top Gun: Maverick	As Don Simpson/Jerry Bruckheimer Films
2024	Bad Boys: Ride or Die	As Don Simpson/Jerry Bruckheimer Films
2024	Beverly Hills Cop: Axel F	As Don Simpson/Jerry Bruckheimer Films
