= Double Jeopardy (1999 film) =

1999 crime thriller film by Bruce Beresford

- Theatrical release poster
- Directed by: Bruce Beresford
- Written by: David Weisberg; Douglas Cook
- Produced by: Leonard Goldberg
- Starring: Tommy Lee Jones; Ashley Judd; Bruce Greenwood; Annabeth Gish
- Cinematography: Peter James
- Edited by: Mark Warner
- Music by: Normand Corbeil
- Distributed by: Paramount Pictures
- Release date: September 24, 1999
- Running time: 105 minutes
- Country: United States
- Language: English
- Budget: $40 million
- Box office: $177.8 million

Double Jeopardy is a 1999 American crime thriller film directed by Bruce Beresford, and starring Ashley Judd, Tommy Lee Jones, and Bruce Greenwood. Released by Paramount Pictures on September 24, 1999, the film received mixed reviews from critics and grossed $177.8 million against a $40 million budget.

== Plot ==
Wealthy Whidbey Island, Washington, residents Libby and Nick Parsons live a seemingly idyllic life with their four-year-old son, Matty. Nick buys Libby's favorite sailboat, and the couple depart for a weekend trip while Libby's close friend. Angela Green, watches Matty. Libby awakens aboard the boat to find blood everywhere, Nick missing, and a bloody knife. The Coast Guard arrives, after receiving a call from Nick claiming to have been stabbed, to find Libby on deck holding the bloody knife.

Although Nick's body is not found, Libby is convicted of murder. Her motive is assumed to be a $2 million life insurance policy and her alleged knowledge that Nick was under investigation for embezzlement. Libby asks Angela to adopt Matty and care for him while she is in prison. When Angela stops bringing Matty to visit, Libby tracks Angela to San Francisco, obtaining her address and phone from school staff, calling on the prison's payphone and demanding to speak with Matty. During their conversation, Nick enters Angela's apartment, and Matty calls out, "Daddy!" before the phone disconnects; Libby realizes Nick is alive, having faked his death.

Inmate Margaret Skolowski, a former lawyer, advises her to get paroled, and says Libby can kill Nick with impunity due to the Double Jeopardy Clause in the US Constitution, meaning she cannot be convicted of the same murder twice. Libby spends her prison time with purpose.

After six years in prison, Libby is paroled to a halfway house under supervision of parole officer Travis Lehman. To search for Nick, Libby violates curfew and is caught breaking into Matty's old school to access Angela's records. As Lehman is taking Libby back to prison, she drives his car off a ferry into Puget Sound, grabs his gun, and swims to shore. Going to her mother, she gets emergency cash and an old pickup truck.

At Angela’s address in Evergreen, Colorado, Libby discovers Angela married a man named "Simon Ryder" and was killed in an explosion caused by a natural gas leak. An archived newspaper photo of Angela shows in the background a Wassily Kandinsky painting previously among Nick's collection. At a local gallery, Libby searches the painting’s provenance and sales through ArtScan, tracing Nick to New Orleans. Lehman almost catches her at the gallery, but she flees. In New Orleans, she finds Nick running a boutique hotel under the alias "Jonathan Devereaux".

Libby confronts Nick publicly at a party he hosts at the hotel, drawing him aside and demanding he return Matty in exchange for her not exposing him. Claiming he faked his death to avoid bankruptcy and provide her and Matty with the insurance money, Nick says he never believed she would be convicted. She rejects this story and the circumstances of Angela's death. Libby demands Nick hand over Matty the next day at the public Lafayette Cemetery. During their conversation, Lehman arrives at the hotel, and Libby slips out. Lehman informs "Jonathan" that Libby believes he is her supposedly dead ex-husband and informs the police that she is in the area.

At Lafayette Cemetery, Nick has a local boy lure Libby into a mausoleum, attacks her, and entombs her alive, but she frees herself. Meanwhile, Lehman visits "Jonathan's" office and notices the Kandinsky artwork Libby researched at the gallery. Now skeptical of Libby's guilt, Lehman gets a photocopy of Nicholas Parsons' driver's license.

Lehman intercepts Libby, who breaks down sobbing. He goes to Nick's hotel and reveals to Nick that he knows his true identity. After asking for a $1 million bribe for his silence, Lehman agrees to take $100,000, expressing concern that Libby could blow their deal. Nick says he has "buried" that problem. Libby then enters with Lehman's gun, she and Lehman having cornered Nick. Libby informs Nick she can kill him with impunity. After Nick discloses Matty’s whereabouts at a Georgia boarding school, Lehman reveals he recorded Nick's confession of burying Libby. Pulling a gun, Nick shoots and wounds Lehman. In the ensuing struggle, Libby shoots and kills Nick. Lehman insists they return to Washington to win her pardon. Later they find Matty at the boarding school, where he recognizes Libby, saying he had been told she was dead, and they embrace.

== Cast ==
- Ashley Judd as Elizabeth "Libby" Parsons
- Tommy Lee Jones as Travis Lehman
- Bruce Greenwood as Nick Parsons / Simon Ryder / Jonathan Devereaux
- Annabeth Gish as Angela Green
- Roma Maffia as Margaret Skolowski
- Jay Brazeau as Bobby Long
- Michael Gaston as Cutter
- Dave Hager as Jim Mangold
- Davenia McFadden as Evelyn Lake
- Betsy Brantley as the prosecutor
- Spencer Treat Clark as Matty Parsons - Age 11

== Production ==
Paramount Pictures acquired Double Jeopardy in 1995 as a pitch from screenwriters David Weisberg and Douglas S. Cook for producer Leonard Goldberg with Paramount acquiring the project for $260,000 against $500,000.

Double Jeopardy began development as a potential project for Harold Becker before Becker departed to pursue other projects. Luis Mandoki was then attached to the film until he too bowed out of the film. In August 1997, it was reported Bruce Beresford would direct the film. Jodie Foster was attached to star in the film as Libby Parsons and Bruce Beresford met with her several times about the script. In December 1997, Foster departed the project citing "personal reasons" with Paramount scrambling to find potential replacement leads with Helen Hunt noted as one possible option. In April 1998, Tommy Lee Jones was reportedly in negotiations to play the co-lead in the film for a fee higher than the $10 million he'd earned for U.S. Marshals. That same month, Ashley Judd entered talks for the lead role after Hunt and Michelle Pfeiffer both declined. Robert Benton performed an additional rewrite of the script. In June of that year, Annabeth Gish and Roma Maffia enter negotiations for roles in the film. The following month, Bruce Greenwood was cast as Nick Parsons after being screen tested alongside William Baldwin and Dylan Walsh. Initially, the producers had wanted Greg Kinnear for the role of Nick.

Both Meg Ryan and Brooke Shields declined the lead role.

Double Jeopardy was filmed from July 15, 1998 to October 21, 1998.

== Release ==
Double Jeopardy was theatrically released in the United States on September 24, 1999. A home video release followed on February 22, 2000.

== Reception ==
On Rotten Tomatoes, the film holds an approval rating of 28% based on 87 reviews and an average rating of 4.5/10. The site's critics consensus reads: "A talented cast fails to save this unremarkable thriller." On Metacritic, it has a weighted average score of 40 out of 100 based on 30 critics, indicating "mixed or average" reviews. Audiences polled by CinemaScore gave the film an average grade of "B+" on an A+ to F scale.

Roger Ebert gave the film two and a half stars out of four, and said "This movie was made primarily in the hopes that it would gross millions and millions of dollars, which probably explains most of the things that are wrong with it." Leonard Maltin gave the film 3 out of 4 stars, calling it "slick entertainment". Mick LaSalle from the San Francisco Chronicle wrote that the film is a "well-acted diversion, directed by Bruce Beresford (Driving Miss Daisy) with an intelligent grasp of the moment-to-moment emotion". Gregory Weinkauf of Dallas Observer described it as "a solo Thelma and Louise crossed with a gender-reversed The Fugitive with a dry twist of Fletch." For her performance in the film, Ashley Judd won Favorite Actress at the 6th Blockbuster Entertainment Awards.

=== Accolades ===
Award	Category	Subject	Result
MTV Movie Award	Best Female Performance	Ashley Judd	Nominated
Blockbuster Entertainment Awards	Favorite Actress – Suspense	Ashley Judd	Won
Blockbuster Entertainment Awards	Favorite Actor – Suspense	Tommy Lee Jones	Nominated
Blockbuster Entertainment Awards	Favorite Supporting Actor – Suspense	Bruce Greenwood	Nominated

=== Box office ===
The film spent three weeks as the No. 1 film. It grossed $116 million in the US and $61 million overseas.

== Misinterpretation of the concept of double jeopardy ==
In the film, Libby's fellow inmate, Margaret incorrectly asserts that the Double Jeopardy Clause of the Fifth Amendment gives people a free pass to commit the crime they were wrongfully convicted of. The newspaper column The Straight Dope observed, "a crime, for double jeopardy purposes, consists of a specific set of facts. Change the facts and you've got a new crime ... no one would believe that a person convicted of beating Richard Roe to a pulp on December 8th could avoid another conviction for tracking down poor Rich in February and whaling on him again."

In the 1938 Blockburger case, the U.S. Supreme Court ruled that multiple counts of crimes are distinct, not qualifying as double jeopardy if each case relies upon proof of different facts. If, following her wrongful conviction, Libby were to actually murder Nick, this would qualify as a distinct crime – reliant on the proof of different facts – than her initial murder conviction.

Additionally, in the film, Libby confronts Nick in a different state from that in which she had originally been convicted of his murder; this alone suffices to prevent the concept of double jeopardy from applying (as the protection only bars successive prosecutions by the same sovereign).
