= The Rock (film) =

1996 American action thriller film by Michael Bay

- Theatrical release poster
- Directed by: Michael Bay
- Screenplay by: David Weisberg; Douglas S. Cook; Mark Rosner
- Story by: David Weisberg; Douglas S. Cook
- Produced by: Don Simpson; Jerry Bruckheimer
- Starring: Sean Connery; Nicolas Cage; Ed Harris; Michael Biehn; William Forsythe
- Cinematography: John Schwartzman
- Edited by: Richard Francis-Bruce
- Music by: Nick Glennie-Smith; Hans Zimmer
- Production companies: Hollywood Pictures; Don Simpson/Jerry Bruckheimer Films
- Distributed by: Buena Vista Pictures Distribution
- Release date: June 7, 1996
- Running time: 136 minutes
- Country: United States
- Language: English
- Budget: $75 million
- Box office: $335.6 million

The Rock is a 1996 American action thriller film directed by Michael Bay, produced by Don Simpson and Jerry Bruckheimer, and written by David Weisberg, Douglas S. Cook and Mark Rosner. It stars Sean Connery, Nicolas Cage and Ed Harris, with supporting roles played by Michael Biehn, William Forsythe, David Morse, and John Spencer. The plot follows a former SAS captain (Connery) and an FBI chemist (Cage), who attempt to disarm missiles from a rogue group of Force Recon Marines who have taken control of the former prison on Alcatraz Island.

The Rock was dedicated to the memory of Simpson, who died five months before its release. It was released by Buena Vista Pictures Distribution through the Hollywood Pictures label on June 7, 1996. It received generally positive reviews and was nominated for Best Sound at the 69th Academy Awards. It earned over $335 million at the box office on a production budget of $75 million, becoming the fourth highest-grossing film of 1996. The Rock was remade in India in 2003 as Qayamat: City Under Threat.

The Rock was the basis for false descriptions of the Iraqi chemical weapons program in 2002. Britain's Secret Intelligence Service was led to believe Saddam Hussein was continuing to produce weapons of mass destruction by a false agent who based his reports on The Rock, according to the Chilcot Inquiry.

== Plot ==
A disillusioned USMC Brigadier General Francis Hummel and his rogue group of Force Recon Marines, including his loyal subordinate Major Tom Baxter, steal 15 rockets filled with lethal VX gas from a U.S. Navy facility. The next day, they seize control of the former prison on Alcatraz Island, taking the tourists and guards hostage. Hummel contacts the FBI and the Pentagon, threatening to launch the rockets at the San Francisco Bay Area in 40 hours unless the government pays him $100 million, which will be donated to the families of the men who died during his command but were never compensated.

The Department of Defense and the FBI plan to retake Alcatraz by infiltrating the old tunnel system beneath the island, with Navy SEALs led by Commander Anderson. They recruit FBI chemical weapons specialist Special Agent Dr. Stanley Goodspeed to join them and disarm the rockets safely. With no knowledge of the island tunnel system, FBI Director Womack reluctantly calls on the aid of the imprisoned John Mason, a former British SAS Captain and MI6-trained operative and the only man to escape Alcatraz after he stole a microfilm created by J. Edgar Hoover containing classified U.S. information. Mason refused to reveal the microfilm's location after being captured, believing he would be killed, and was instead imprisoned without trial. Mason agrees to assist after being presented with a pardon that clears his record, though Womack destroys it shortly thereafter.

Mason escapes and leads the FBI on a car chase, causing a rampage through the city before being caught by Goodspeed when he meets with his estranged daughter, Jade. At the command center, Mason negotiates to join the team heading to Alcatraz. The team infiltrates the prison, but Hummel's men are alerted to their presence and ambush them in the shower room. Hummel tries to convince Anderson to surrender, but the overzealous Captains Frye and Darrow deliberately cause a shootout that kills Anderson and his team. Mason and Goodspeed manage to evade them. Believing the mission to be a failure, Mason prepares to leave until Goodspeed reveals the truth about the VX, which endangers Mason's daughter and Goodspeed’s fiancée, Carla, who came to San Francisco despite Goodspeed telling her to stay home.

Mason works together with Goodspeed to disable twelve rockets and kill several Marines. After Hummel threatens to execute a hostage, Mason surrenders to stall him while Goodspeed disables another rocket before also being captured. They escape from their cells, but Mason, having assessed Hummel as a man of honor who has no intention of killing innocents, leaves, with Goodspeed continuing on his own. Goodspeed is caught and held at gunpoint, but Mason suddenly saves him, convinced that Goodspeed's unborn child needs its father.

As the deadline passes, Frye and Darrow pressure Hummel into firing a rocket, but he redirects it to detonate in the sea. Hummel explains the rockets were a bluff and that he never intended to kill anyone. Realizing they will not be paid, Frye and Darrow convince the remaining Marines to mutiny against Hummel and Baxter. Baxter is killed, and Hummel mortally wounded, but he tells Goodspeed the location of the last rocket.

With the team assumed dead, the government initiates a backup launch measure: an airstrike aimed at destroying Alcatraz with experimental thermite plasma bombs, which will neutralize the gas but kill everyone on the island. Goodspeed and Mason kill the remaining Marines before Goodspeed launches green flares, a signal for the attack to be aborted; one of the bombs is already dropped at the back of the island, and the blast throws Goodspeed into the bay, but Mason saves him.

Goodspeed confirms the mission's success to Womack but claims Mason was killed in the explosion before telling Mason that Womack shredded his pardon. The pair part ways amicably, with Goodspeed telling Mason where clothes and money are at the hotel. Mason suggests that Goodspeed visit a church in Kansas where he kept the microfilm. Sometime later, a newly wedded Goodspeed and Carla recover the microfilm from the church.

== Cast ==
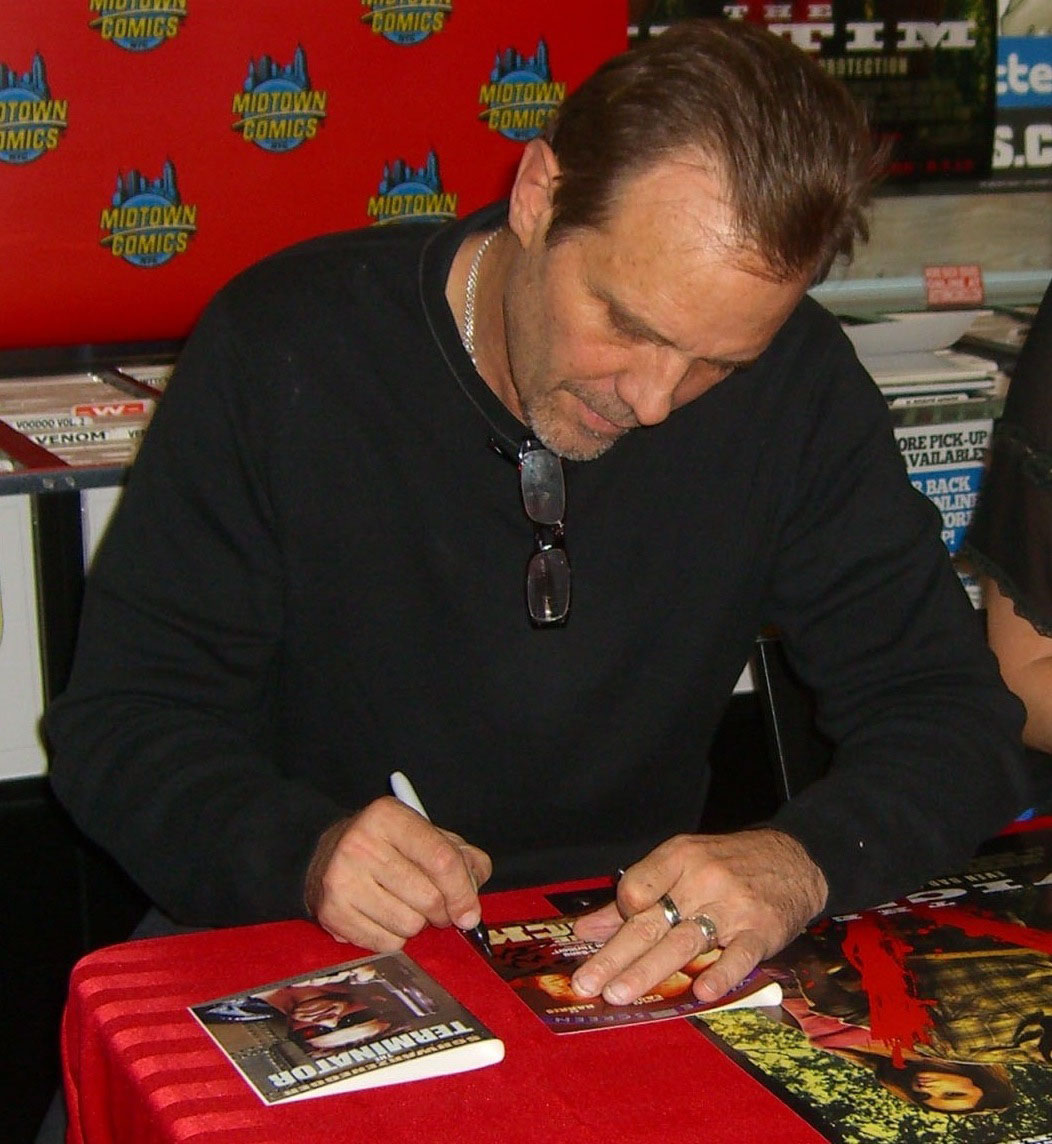
Michael Biehn signing a DVD copy of The Rock in 2012

- Sean Connery as Captain (retired) John Patrick Mason SAS/MI6, a cunning federal prisoner who is the only man able to have escaped Alcatraz Prison
- Nicolas Cage as Special Agent Dr. Stanley Goodspeed, FBI, a chemical weapons expert with no combat experience
- Ed Harris as Brigadier General Francis "Frank" X. Hummel, USMC, a highly decorated Black Ops officer
- David Morse as Major Tom Baxter, USMC
- John Spencer as FBI Director James Womack
- William Forsythe as Special Agent Ernest Paxton, FBI
- Michael Biehn as Commander Charles Anderson, USN
- Vanessa Marcil as Carla Pestalozzi, Goodspeed's fiancée
- Gregory Sporleder as Captain Frye, USMC
- Tony Todd as Captain Darrow, USMC
- John C. McGinley as Captain Hendrix, USMC
- Bokeem Woodbine as Gunnery Sergeant Crisp, USMC
- Danny Nucci as Lieutenant Shepard, USN
- Claire Forlani as Jade Angelou, Mason's daughter

Uncredited members of the cast include Stuart Wilson as General Al Kramer, Chairman of the Joint Chiefs of Staff; David Marshall Grant as White House Chief of Staff Hayden Sinclair; Philip Baker Hall as the Chief Justice of the United States; Xander Berkeley as FBI technician Lonner; and Stanley Anderson as the President of the United States.

Other actors in smaller roles include Todd Louiso as FBI agent Marvin Isherwood, David Bowe as Dr. Ling, Howard Platt as Louis Lindstrom, John Laughlin as General Peterson, Harry Humphries as Admiral Johansson, Willie Garson as Francis Reynolds, Anthony Clark as Paul the hairdresser, Raymond O'Connor as Alcatraz park ranger Bob, Luenell Campbell as an Alcatraz tourist, Sam Whipple as Alcatraz tourist Larry Henderson and Anthony Guidera and Jim Caviezel as F-18 pilots.

Members of Hummel's USMC unit are played by Raymond Cruz (uncredited) as Sergeant Rojas, Jim Maniaci as Private Scarpetti, Greg Collins as Private Gamble, Brendan Kelly as Private Cox, and Steve Harris as Private McCoy. Dennis Chalker (Dando) and Marshall R. Teague (Reigert) play members of Anderson's SEAL team.

== Production ==
=== Writing and pre-production ===
Jonathan Hensleigh participated in writing the script, which became the subject of a dispute with the Writers Guild of America. The spec script (by David Weisberg and Douglas Cook) was reworked by several writers, but other than the original team, Mark Rosner was the only one granted official credit by guild arbitration. The rule is that the credited writing team must contribute 50% of the final script (effectively limiting credits to the screenplay's initial authors, plus one re-write team). Despite his work on the script, Hensleigh was not credited in the film. Michael Bay wrote an open letter of protest, in which he criticized the arbitration procedure as a "sham" and a "travesty". He said Hensleigh had worked closely with him and should have received screen credit.

British screenwriting team Dick Clement and Ian La Frenais were brought in at Sean Connery's request to rewrite his lines, but ended up altering much of the film's dialogue. Quentin Tarantino and Aaron Sorkin were also uncredited script doctors.

=== Casting ===
At one point, Arnold Schwarzenegger was to have played the role of Goodspeed. Schwarzenegger turned the role down because he did not like the script.

=== Filming ===
Most of The Rock was shot on location in the Alcatraz Prison on Alcatraz Island. As it is governed by the National Park Service, it was not possible to close Alcatraz, and much of the filming had to accommodate tour parties. The scene in which FBI Director Womack is thrown off the balcony was filmed on location at the Fairmont Hotel in San Francisco. The filming led to numerous calls to the hotel by people who saw a man dangling from the balcony. The closing scene was shot outside the Sacred Heart Mission Church in Saticoy, California.

The Rock was Bay's first film shot in a widescreen 2.39:1 aspect ratio, via Super 35. On the commentary track for the Criterion Collection DVD of Armageddon, Bay recalls not liking the format, due to the quality of the release prints, and did not touch the format again until Bad Boys II, at which point the digital intermediate process was available.

There were tensions during shooting between Bay and Walt Disney Studios executives who were supervising the production. On the commentary track for the Criterion Collection DVD, Bay recalls a time when he was preparing to leave the set for a meeting with the executives when he was approached by Connery in golfing attire. Connery, who also produced the film, asked Bay where he was going, and when Bay explained he had a meeting with the executives, Connery asked if he could accompany him. When Bay arrived in the conference room, the executives were surprised when they saw Connery behind him. According to Bay, Connery stood up for Bay and insisted that he was doing a good job and should be left alone.

== Music ==
The soundtrack to The Rock was released on the same day as the film, June 7, 1996, by Hollywood Records. Hans Zimmer and his longtime collaborator Nick Glennie-Smith were the principal composers, while Harry Gregson-Williams was the score producer, with additional music composed by Don Harper, Steven M. Stern and Gregson-Williams. The film represents the first collaboration between Zimmer and Bay, the composer would write and/or produce the scores for many of Bay's films moving forward.

== Reception ==
=== Box office ===
For its opening weekend, The Rock grossed $25 million, beating out Mission: Impossible to reach the number one spot. Upon opening, it surpassed Dick Tracy to achieve the highest opening weekend for a live-action Disney film. This record would last for five months until the premiere of Ransom that November. The film would also hold the record for having Nicolas Cage's biggest opening weekend until Gone in 60 Seconds replaced it in 2000. It would be overtaken by The Cable Guy during its second weekend, earning $18.5 million with a 26.2% decline. The film would hold well in its third weekend, collecting $14.3 million and ranking third behind Eraser and Disney's own The Hunchback of Notre Dame. Produced on a $75 million budget, The Rock grossed a total of $134 million in the U.S. and Canada and $201 million elsewhere, for a worldwide total of $335 million. It was the seventh-highest-grossing film for the U.S. box office in 1996, and the fourth-highest-grossing U.S. film worldwide that year.

=== Critical response ===
On Rotten Tomatoes, the film has an approval rating of 76% based on 137 reviews, with an average rating of 6.9/10. The website's critics consensus reads: "For visceral thrills, it can't be beat – just don't expect The Rock to engage your brain." On Metacritic, the film has a weighted average score of 58 out of 100, based on 24 critics, indicating "mixed or average reviews". Audiences polled by CinemaScore gave the film an average grade of "A" on an A+ to F scale.

Roger Ebert awarded the film 3.5 out of 4 stars, praising it as "a first-rate, slam-bang action thriller with a lot of style and no little humor". Todd McCarthy of Variety gave the film a positive review, commenting "The yarn has its share of gaping holes and jaw-dropping improbabilities, but director Michael Bay sweeps them all aside with his never-take-a-breath pacing." Richard Corliss, writing for Time, wrote: "Slick, brutal and almost human, this is the team-spirit action movie Mission: Impossible should have been." David Sterritt of Christian Science Monitor said, "The filmmakers got suckered by their own high-tech effects, turning a potentially clever entertainment into yet another barrage of violence, vulgarity, and excess."

=== Accolades ===
The Rock won several minor awards, including 'Best On-Screen Duo' for Connery and Cage at the MTV Movie Awards. It was also nominated for an Academy Award for Best Sound (Kevin O'Connell, Greg P. Russell and Keith A. Wester).

The film was selected for a limited edition DVD release by the Criterion Collection, a distributor of primarily arthouse films it categorizes as "important classic and contemporary films" and "cinema at its finest". In an essay supporting the selection of The Rock, Roger Ebert, who was strongly critical of most of Bay's later films, gave the film 3 1/2 out of four stars, calling it "an action picture that rises to the top of the genre because of a literate, witty screenplay and skilled craftsmanship in the direction and special effects."

In 2014, Time Out polled several film critics, directors, actors and stunt actors to list their top action films. The Rock was listed at 74th place on the list. In 2019, Tom Reimann from Collider ranked The Rock as Bay's best film and "a perfect snapshot of the height of 90s action movies".

== Iraqi chemical weapons program ==
In September 2002, MI6 chief Sir Richard Dearlove said the agency had acquired information from a new source revealing that Iraq was stepping up production of chemical and biological warfare agents. The source, who was said to have "direct access", claimed senior staff were working seven days a week while the regime was concentrating a great deal of effort on the production of anthrax. Dearlove told the chairman of the Joint Intelligence Committee (JIC), Sir John Scarlett, that they were "on the edge of (a) significant intel breakthrough" which could be the "key to unlock" Iraq's weapons programme.

However, it was noticed that the agent's description of glass containers, not typically used for chemical munitions, resembled the fictional nerve gas depicted in glass beads or spheres in The Rock. By February 2003 – a month before the invasion of Iraq – MI6 concluded that their source had been lying "over a period of time" but failed to inform No 10 or others, even though Prime Minister Tony Blair had been briefed on this intelligence. According to The Independent, the false claims of weapons of mass destruction were the justification for UK's entering the war.

Screenwriter David Weisberg said, "What was so amazing was anybody in the poison gas community would immediately know that this was total bullshit – such obvious bullshit". Weisberg said he was unsurprised a desperate agent might resort to films for inspiration, but dismayed that authorities "didn't do apparently the most basic fact-checking or vetting of the information. If you'd just asked a chemical weapons expert, it would have been immediately obvious it was ludicrous." Weisberg said he had had some "funny emails" after the report, but he felt "it's not a nice legacy for the film." "It's tragic that we went to war," he concluded.

== Unproduced sequel ==
Director Michael Bay said he had an idea for a follow-up to The Rock that never developed past the concept that would have involved Goodspeed and Mason being chased by the government, due to Goodspeed's possession of the microfilm.

== See also ==
- List of films featuring the United States Navy SEALs
- Alcatraz Island in popular culture
