= Dangerous Minds (TV series) =

American drama television series

- Created by: Ronald Bass; Jane Rusconi; Diane Frolov; Andrew Schneider
- Based on: Dangerous Minds by Ronald Bass; My Posse Don't Do Homework by LouAnne Johnson
- Starring: Annie Potts; Tamala Jones; Cedrik Terrell; Michael Jace; K. Todd Freeman; William Converse-Roberts; Vicellous Reon Shannon; Jenny Gago; Greg Serano; Maria Costa; LaToya Howlett; Stanley Anderson; Jeff Cahill
- Opening theme: "Dangerous Minds Theme" by Lee Curreri
- Country of origin: United States
- Original language: English
- No. of seasons: 1
- No. of episodes: 17

Production
- Executive producers: Don Simpson; Jerry Bruckheimer; Ronald Bass; Diane Frolov; Andrew Schneider
- Production companies: Predawn Productions; Don Simpson/Jerry Bruckheimer Films; Touchstone Television

Original release
- Network: ABC
- Release: September 30, 1996 – March 15, 1997

Dangerous Minds is an American drama television series that aired on ABC from September 30, 1996, to March 15, 1997. The series is based on the film of the same name. Annie Potts stars in the lead role originated by Michelle Pfeiffer.

== Plot ==
Based on the experiences of former U.S. Marine LouAnne Johnson and the film of the same name, the story follows Johnson as she takes a teaching position at an inner-city high school. She uses unconventional methods to engage a class of academically capable but challenging students while addressing difficulties they face both in and outside school.

== Cast ==
- Annie Potts as LouAnne Johnson
- Tamala Jones as Callie Timmons
- Cedrik Terrell as James Revill
- Michael Jace (pilot) & K. Todd Freeman as Jerome Griffin
- William Converse-Roberts as Hal Gray
- Vicellous Reon Shannon as Cornelious Hawkins
- Jenny Gago as Amanda Bardoles
- Greg Serano as Gusmaro Lopez
- Maria Costa as Blanca Guerrero
- LaToya Howlett as Alvina Edwards
- Stanley Anderson as Bud Bartkus
- Jeff Cahill as Garrity Hartman

== Production ==
In May 1996, it was announced Dangerous Minds would be adapted into a drama series for ABC's 1996–97 Fall schedule with Annie Potts playing the lead role of LouAnne Johnson, who had been played by Michelle Pfeiffer in the film. In May 1997, it was announced Dangerous Minds would not be returning for a second season.

== Episodes ==
No.	Title	Original release date
1	"Pilot"	September 30, 1996
LouAnne has misgivings about the job, and scant details about her predecessor. As LouAnne starts to connect with the kids, three draw special attention: one tough who misses school to help his family financially; an aggressive lad interested in trains; and a girl who's raising her own child. Soon, LouAnne finds that she, too, may need help—when she faces the girl's abusive boyfriend.
2	"Hair Affair"	October 7, 1996
Due to financial cutbacks, LouAnne accepts a student's suggestion to hold a fund-raiser. Gusmaro becomes increasingly disturbed about belonging to a street gang.
3	"See Me"	October 14, 1996
LouAnne arranges for Cornelius to return to school, an action which angers Bartkus. Gusmaro is reluctant to list his date of birth and Social Security number on a form. The students prepare for a practice job interview.
4	"Bad Apple"	October 21, 1996
LouAnne tries to reach a new student, "a hyperactive underachiever", and she makes a first visit to Mickey's Tavern, the faculty's weekly hangout. Meanwhile, James is inspired by Mr. Griffin to plant an apricot tree in the schoolyard.
5	"Family Ties"	October 28, 1996
When an unpopular student is slain, it turns out there's no one to bury him. The father of Callie's daughter returns, which delights the little girl, but not Callie. James and Gusmaro try to turn a goose into a pet.
6	"The Code"	November 11, 1996
LouAnne tries to understand "the code" to which her students adhere when two students swear that they won't continue a fight, and after Gusmaro is arrested for stealing a CD that someone else placed in his backpack. The class visits Alcatraz.
7	"Need Deep"	November 18, 1996
When Blanca contemplates having a baby with her boyfriend so he can leave his gang, LouAnne presses her to reconsider. James thinks his community service will be a piece of cake until he's ordered to serve as companion to a severely disabled boy. Callie worries about her daughter's safety when Callie's mother's boyfriend becomes abusive.
8	"Need Deep"	November 25, 1996
After James is viciously beaten in the locker room, LouAnne places herself in jeopardy by trying to find the attackers. Meanwhile, Gusmaro, also attempting to help, considers joining a new gang. Cornelius seeks a videotape that depicts the assault.
9	"Evolution"	December 9, 1996
After Callie shows compassion for a convicted child molester who's being beaten by protestors, her reaction is questioned by others. Meanwhile, Chaka and James try to photograph a ghost. Blanca is hospitalized with a bleeding ulcer.
10	"Trust Me"	December 16, 1996
When the students suspect a newcomer of being a narc, LouAnne tries to prove them wrong. Meanwhile, Callie is worried about possible repercussions for having informed on a drug dealer. Hal asks LouAnne out to dinner.
11	"Moonstruck"	December 30, 1996
Cornelius is attracted to Callie and encourages by Mr. Griffin to ask her out. Meanwhile, James, who wants to have his grades raised in order to try out for basketball, strikes a deal with LouAnne.
12	"To'e Me Up, To'e Me Down"	January 6, 1997
The news that her ex-husband is remarrying affects LouAnne. A teacher's death causes Barkus to change his approach to students. Cornelius is reluctant to take his graffiti talents to a higher level.
13	"The Feminine Mystique"	January 13, 1997
LouAnne arranges for a house to be built by volunteer labor for Blanca and her family, whose home was destroyed by fire. But when she asks the students for their help, she learns that the construction site is disputed territory between two rival gangs.
14	"Everybody Wants It"	February 10, 1997
The students ask—and some fail to ask—each other to a school Valentine's dance. LouAnne takes a job as a waitress. Gusmaro works delivering liquor; and a new student joins the academy program.
15	"Three Guns"	March 1, 1997
Gusmaro is with LouAnne when preteens steal her car, and his self-confidence is shaken as a result. Meanwhile, Mr. Griffin brings Tibetan monks to school to talk about nonviolence. James takes driving lessons from Mr. Bartkus.
16	"A Different Light"	March 8, 1997
As the school's 50th anniversary approaches, Gusmaro discovers that the man for whom it is named was a racist. Meanwhile, Blanca learns a secret about Garrity and spreads it. Alvina rebels against the cafeteria's food.
17	"Teach, Don't Touch"	March 15, 1997
After LouAnne hugs a distressed student, the lad accuses her of molesting him. While her class and the faculty support her, opposition comes from the boy's father, who is president of the school board.
