= David Weisberg =

American screenwriter

- Occupation: Screenwriter
- Years active: 1991-present
- Notable work: The Rock

David Weisberg is an American screenwriter, best known for writing 1996 film The Rock, which he co-wrote with his writing partner Douglas Cook, who died on July 19, 2015. His other credits with Cook include Payoff, Holy Matrimony, Double Jeopardy and Criminal. They also wrote another action thriller script Blank Slate, which is currently un-produced at Bold Films.

== Filmography ==
- Payoff (1991, TV film)
- Holy Matrimony (1994)
- The Rock (1996)
- Double Jeopardy (1999)
- Criminal (2016)
