= LouAnne Johnson =

American writer, teacher, and former U.S. Navy journalist

- Born: United States
- Occupations: Writer, teacher
- Known for: My Posse Don't Do Homework

LouAnne Johnson is an American writer, teacher and former U.S. Navy journalist. She spent seven years as a radio-TV broadcaster and one year as a Marine Corps Officer, after graduating as Honor Woman in her Marine Corps OCS class. She was the first woman inducted into the DINFOS (Defense Information School) Hall of Fame.

She is best known for the book My Posse Don't Do Homework, which was adapted as the film Dangerous Minds in 1995, and the TV series Dangerous Minds. She was portrayed by Michelle Pfeiffer in the film, and by Annie Potts in the TV series. She is the author of ten books, including a popular textbook for teachers, Teaching Outside the Box (Jossey-Bass) and the Young Adult novel Muchacho (Knopf) which won awards.

== Early life and education ==
Johnson grew up in Youngsville, Pennsylvania. After high school, she enrolled at Indiana University of Pennsylvania but dropped out after a few weeks and enlisted in the Navy in 1971, serving at Clark Air Base in the Philippines. While on active duty, she earned a bachelor's degree in psychology, graduating with honors. Prior to becoming a high school teacher, Johnson also earned a master's degree in teaching English. Later, based on her work designing and presenting staff development workshops and presentations, as well as mentoring teachers, she was awarded an honorary Ed.D. in Educational Leadership from The Sage Colleges in New York.

== Career ==
Johnson wrote about her experience of the service in her 1986 book Making Waves: A Woman in This Man's Navy. She later transferred to the U.S. Marine Corps OCS. Johnson wrote a book about her experience in the USMC, detailing the sexual harassment that she identifies as the primary reason she left the military, but was unable to find a publisher for that book in the 1980s. While working on her graduate thesis in 1989, Johnson began teaching as an intern at Carlmont High School in Belmont, California.

Her memoir, My Posse Don't Do Homework, was based upon her experiences teaching at-risk teens at Carlmont High, where she taught for four years before moving to New Mexico to attend graduate school in creative writing.

In 1995, Johnson taught English at Onate High School in Las Cruces, but left teaching full-time in order to escape the publicity following the movie. She presented staff development workshops around the US and overseas—she was invited to present keynote speeches at the European Council of International Schools and in Puerto Rico. She also taught adult education classes, GED classes, and English as a Second Language classes at various colleges. From 2013–2016, Johnson taught high school in Deming and Silver City, New Mexico.

Since 2010, Johnson has served as an adjunct instructor in the Teacher Education Department at Santa Fe Community College.

== Bibliography ==
- Making Waves (1986)
- My Posse Don’t Do Homework (1992), renamed Dangerous Minds in 1995
- The Girls in the Back of the Class (1996)
- School Is Not a Four-Letter Word (1997)
- Two Parts Textbook, One Part Love (1998)
- Queen of Education (2004)
- Teaching Outside the Box (2005, 2009, 2012)
- Muchacho (2009)

== See also ==
- List of teachers portrayed in films
