= Douglas S. Cook =

American screenwriter (1959–2015)

- Born: June 26, 1959; Boston, Massachusetts, U.S.
- Died: July 19, 2015 (aged 56); Malibu, California, U.S.
- Occupation: Screenwriter
- Years active: 1991–2015
- Notable work: The Rock

Douglas S. Cook (June 26, 1959 – July 19, 2015) was an American screenwriter best known for writing the 1996 film The Rock. His other credits included Payoff, Holy Matrimony, Double Jeopardy and Criminal. Cook wrote all of his screenplays with David Weisberg. They also wrote another action thriller script Blank Slate, which is currently un-produced at Bold Films.

== Early life and education ==
Cook grew up in Boston and graduated from Phillips Exeter Academy and Harvard University. His siblings included Peter Mackenzie, an actor.

== Career ==
Cook moved to California to pursue a career in screenwriting.

== Personal life ==
Cook was married to Justine Jacoby Cook for 27 years. She was a former casting director and a production manager for the Marat Daukayev School of Ballet in Los Angeles. In November 2013, she died of ovarian cancer at age 53. They had two children.

Cook died on July 19, 2015, at age 56 while visiting Malibu, California.

== Filmography ==
- Payoff (1991, TV film)
- Holy Matrimony (1994)
- The Rock (1996)
- Double Jeopardy (1999)
- Criminal (2016)
