= Lists of box office number-one films =

The following are lists of films which have been placed number one at the weekend box office in a region.

== By year ==
=== 1930s–1940s ===
1930s						1940s			
1932	1933	1934	1935	1936	1937	1946	1947	1948	1949
United States	United States	United States	United States	United States	United States	United States	United States	United States	United States

=== 1950s ===
1950	1951	1952	1953	1954	1955	1956	1957	1958	1959
United States	United States	United States	United States	United States	United States	United States	United States	United States	United States

=== 1960s ===
1960	1961	1962	1963	1964	1965	1966	1967	1968	1969
United States	United States	United States	United States	United States	United States	United States	United States	United States	United States

=== 1970s ===
1970	1971	1972	1973	1974	1975	1976	1977	1978	1979
United States	United States	United States	United States	United States	United States	United States	United States	United States	United States

=== 1980s ===
1980	1981	1982	1983	1984	1985	1986	1987	1988	1989
–	–	–	–	–	United Kingdom	United Kingdom	United Kingdom	United Kingdom	United Kingdom
United States	United States	United States	United States	United States	United States	United States	United States	United States	United States

=== 1990s ===
1990	1991	1992	1993	1994	1995	1996	1997	1998	1999
Australia	Australia	Australia	Australia	Australia	Australia	–	Australia	Australia	Australia
–	–	–	France	France	France	–	France	–	–
–	–	Italy	Italy	Italy	Italy	–	Italy	–	–
–	–	–	Japan	Japan	Japan	–	Japan	–	–
United Kingdom	United Kingdom	United Kingdom	United Kingdom	United Kingdom	United Kingdom	United Kingdom	United Kingdom	United Kingdom	United Kingdom
United States	United States	United States	United States	United States	United States	United States	United States	United States	United States

=== 2000s ===
2000	2001	2002	2003	2004	2005	2006	2007	2008	2009
–	–	–	Argentina	–	–	–	–	–	–
Australia	Australia	Australia	Australia	Australia	Australia	Australia	Australia	Australia	Australia
–	–	–	Austria	Austria	Austria	Austria	Austria	Austria	Austria
–	–	–	–	–	–	–	Belgium	Belgium	Belgium
–	–	–	–	–	–	–	Brazil	Brazil	Brazil
–	–	Canada	Canada	Canada	Canada	Canada	Canada	Canada	Canada
–	–	–	–	–	–	–	Chile	Chile	Chile
–	–	–	–	–	–	–	–	–	Ecuador
–	France	–	–	–	–	–	–	–	–
–	Italy	–	–	–	–	–	–	–	Italy
–	Japan	–	–	Japan	Japan	Japan	Japan	Japan	Japan
–	Mexico	Mexico	Mexico	Mexico	–	–	Mexico	Mexico	Mexico
–	–	–	–	–	–	–	–	–	Netherlands
–	–	–	–	–	–	–	–	Philippines	Philippines
–	–	–	–	–	–	–	–	Romania	Romania
–	–	–	–	–	–	South Korea	South Korea	South Korea	South Korea
–	–	–	–	–	–	–	Spain	Spain	Spain
–	–	–	–	–	Turkey	Turkey	Turkey	Turkey	Turkey
United Kingdom	United Kingdom	United Kingdom	United Kingdom	United Kingdom	United Kingdom	United Kingdom	United Kingdom	United Kingdom	United Kingdom
United States	United States	United States	United States	United States	United States	United States	United States	United States	United States
–	–	–	–	–	–	–	–	–	Venezuela

=== 2010s ===
2010	2011	2012	2013	2014	2015	2016	2017	2018	2019
–	–	–	–	–	–	Argentina	Argentina	Argentina	Argentina
Australia	Australia	Australia	Australia	Australia	Australia	Australia	Australia	Australia	Australia
Austria	Austria	Austria	Austria	Austria	Austria	Austria	Austria	Austria	Austria
–	–	–	–	–	–	–	Belgium	Belgium	Belgium
Brazil	–	–	–	–	–	Brazil	Brazil	Brazil	Brazil
Canada	–	–	–	–	–	–	–	–	–
–	–	–	–	–	Chile	–	Chile	Chile	–
–	–	–	China	China	China	China	China	China	China
–	Colombia	Colombia	–	–	–	Colombia	Colombia	Colombia	Colombia
Ecuador	Ecuador	Ecuador	Ecuador	Ecuador	–	–	–	–	–
–	France	France	France	France	France	France	France	France	France
–	–	–	Greece	–	–	–	–	–	–
–	–	–	–	–	–	–	–	–	Indonesia
–	Ireland	–	–	–	–	–	–	–	–
Italy	Italy	Italy	Italy	–	–	Italy	Italy	Italy	Italy
Japan	Japan	Japan	Japan	Japan	Japan	Japan	Japan	Japan	Japan
Mexico	Mexico	Mexico	Mexico	Mexico	Mexico	Mexico	Mexico	Mexico	Mexico
–	–	–	–	–	–	–	–	–	New Zealand
–	–	–	–	–	–	–	–	–	Paraguay
Philippines	Philippines	Philippines	Philippines	Philippines	Philippines	–	–	–	–
Poland	Poland	–	Poland	–	–	–	–	–	–
Romania	Romania	Romania	Romania	Romania	Romania	Romania	Romania	Romania	Romania
South Korea	South Korea	South Korea	South Korea	South Korea	South Korea	South Korea	South Korea	South Korea	South Korea
Spain	Spain	Spain	Spain	Spain	Spain	Spain	Spain	Spain	Spain
–	–	–	–	–	–	Taipei	Taipei	Taipei	Taipei
–	–	–	Thailand	Thailand	Thailand	Thailand	Thailand	Thailand	Thailand
Turkey	Turkey	Turkey	Turkey	Turkey	–	Turkey	Turkey	Turkey	Turkey
United Kingdom	United Kingdom	United Kingdom	United Kingdom	United Kingdom	United Kingdom	United Kingdom	United Kingdom	United Kingdom	United Kingdom
United States	United States	United States	United States	United States	United States	United States	United States	United States	United States
Venezuela	Venezuela	Venezuela	Venezuela	Venezuela	Venezuela	Venezuela	Venezuela	–	–

=== 2020s ===
2020	2021	2022	2023	2024	2025	2026
Argentina	Argentina	Argentina	Argentina	Argentina	Argentina	Argentina
Australia	Australia	Australia	Australia	Australia	Australia	Australia
Austria	Austria	Austria	Austria	Austria	Austria	Austria
Belgium	Belgium	–	–	–	–	–
Brazil	Brazil	–	–	–	Brazil	Brazil
–	–	–	–	–	–	Chile
China	China	China	–	–	China	–
Colombia	Colombia	–	–	Colombia	Colombia	Colombia
–	–	–	–	–	–	Ecuador
France	France	France	France	France	France	–
–	–	Germany	–	Germany	Germany	–
–	Hong Kong	Hong Kong	Hong Kong	Hong Kong	Hong Kong	–
–	–	India	India	India	India	India
Indonesia	Indonesia	Indonesia	Indonesia	Indonesia	Indonesia	Indonesia
Italy	–	Italy	Italy	Italy	Italy	–
Japan	Japan	Japan	Japan	Japan	Japan	Japan
–	Lithuania	Lithuania	Lithuania	–	Lithuania	–
Mexico	Mexico	Mexico	Mexico	Mexico	Mexico	Mexico
New Zealand	New Zealand	New Zealand	New Zealand	New Zealand	New Zealand	New Zealand
–	–	Pakistan	Pakistan	–	–	–
Paraguay	–	–	–	–	–	–
–	Poland	–	–	–	–	–
Romania	Romania	Romania	Romania	Romania	Romania	Romania
South Korea	South Korea	South Korea	South Korea	South Korea	South Korea	South Korea
Spain	Spain	Spain	Spain	Spain	Spain	Spain
Taipei	–	–	–	–	–	–
Thailand	Thailand	Thailand	Thailand	Thailand	Thailand	Thailand
Turkey	Turkey	Turkey	Turkey	Turkey	Turkey	–
United Kingdom	United Kingdom	United Kingdom	United Kingdom	United Kingdom	United Kingdom	United Kingdom
United States	United States	United States	United States	United States	United States	United States

== By country ==
=== India ===
- List of 2022 box office number-one films in India
- List of 2023 box office number-one films in India
- List of 2024 box office number-one films in India
- List of 2025 box office number-one films in India
- List of 2026 box office number-one films in India

=== United Kingdom ===
- 1985
- 1986
- 1987
- 1988
- 1989
- 1990
- 1991
- 1992
- 1993
- 1994
- 1995
- 1996
- 1997
- 1998
- 1999
- 2000
- 2001
- 2002
- 2003
- 2004
- 2005
- 2006
- 2007
- 2008
- 2009
- 2010
- 2011
- 2012
- 2013
- 2014
- 2015
- 2016
- 2017
- 2018
- 2019
- 2020
- 2021
- 2022
- 2023
- 2024
- 2025
- 2026

=== United States ===
- 1932
- 1933
- 1934
- 1935
- 1936
- 1937
- 1946
- 1947
- 1948
- 1949
- 1950
- 1951
- 1952
- 1953
- 1954
- 1955
- 1956
- 1957
- 1958
- 1959
- 1960
- 1961
- 1962
- 1963
- 1964
- 1965
- 1966
- 1967
- 1968
- 1969
- 1970
- 1971
- 1972
- 1973
- 1974
- 1975
- 1976
- 1977
- 1978
- 1979
- 1980
- 1981
- 1982
- 1983
- 1984
- 1985
- 1986
- 1987
- 1988
- 1989
- 1990
- 1991
- 1992
- 1993
- 1994
- 1995
- 1996
- 1997
- 1998
- 1999
- 2000
- 2001
- 2002
- 2003
- 2004
- 2005
- 2006
- 2007
- 2008
- 2009
- 2010
- 2011
- 2012
- 2013
- 2014
- 2015
- 2016
- 2017
- 2018
- 2019
- 2020
- 2021
- 2022
- 2023
- 2024
- 2025
- 2026

== See also ==
- Box office
- List of highest-grossing films
- Lists of highest-grossing films
- List of films with the most weekends at number one in North America
- Lists of box office number-one films in the United Kingdom
- Lists of box office number-one films in the United States
