= List of 1997 box office number-one films in Japan =

This is a list of films which have placed number one at the weekly box office in Japan during 1997. Amounts are in Yen and are from Japan's nine major cities.

== Number one films ==
†	This implies the highest-grossing movie of the year.

#	Week ending	Film	Box office	Notes	Ref
1	January 3, 1997	Independence Day	612,655,624	Weekend only	
2	January 12, 1997	Independence Day	182,952,648	Weekend only	
3	January 19, 1997	Independence Day	157,206,676	Weekend only	
4	January 26, 1997	Independence Day	142,151,472	Weekend only	
5	February 2, 1997	Independence Day	125,502,010	Weekend only	
6	February 9, 1997	Independence Day	105,617,640	Weekend only	
7	February 14, 1997	Independence Day	230,034,477		
8	February 21, 1997	Ransom	262,028,253		
9	February 28, 1997	Ransom	208,489,797		
10	March 7, 1997	Ransom	176,000,000		
11	March 14, 1997	Dante's Peak	184,348,466		
12	March 21, 1997	101 Dalmatians	220,853,160		
13	March 28, 1997	101 Dalmatians	186,800,048		
14	April 4, 1997	101 Dalmatians	206,589,125		
15	April 11, 1997	The Devil's Own	307,550,000		
16	April 18, 1997	Sleepers	255,905,875		
17	April 25, 1997	Sleepers	194,559,750		
18	May 2, 1997	Sleepers	231,225,246		
19	May 9, 1997	Sleepers	194,755,275		
20	May 16, 1997	Lost Paradise	135,073,698		
21	May 23, 1997	Jerry Maguire	180,402,036		
22	May 30, 1997	Jerry Maguire	154,794,558		
23	June 6, 1997	Star Wars (Special Edition)	219,270,066		
24	June 13, 1997	Star Wars (Special Edition)	173,608,662		
25	June 20, 1997	Star Wars (Special Edition)	159,699,235		
26	June 27, 1997	Star Wars (Special Edition)	144,561,576		
27	July 4, 1997	Star Wars (Special Edition)	158,053,952		
28	July 11, 1997	The Empire Strikes Back (Special Edition)	172,038,319		
29	July 18, 1997	The Lost World: Jurassic Park	881,267,544	The Lost World: Jurassic Park grossed ¥1.24 billion nationally	
30	July 25, 1997	The Lost World: Jurassic Park	570,732,644		
31	August 1, 1997	The Lost World: Jurassic Park	514,687,090		
32	August 8, 1997	Princess Mononoke †	475,833,720	Princess Mononoke reached number one in its fourth week of release	
33	August 15, 1997	The Lost World: Jurassic Park	612,877,250	The Lost World: Jurassic Park returned to number one in its fifth week of release	
34	August 22, 1997	Princess Mononoke †	502,142,274	Princess Mononoke returned to number one in its sixth week of release	
35	August 29, 1997	Princess Mononoke †	436,380,329		
36	September 5, 1997	Princess Mononoke †	342,230,834		
37	September 12, 1997	Princess Mononoke †	295,632,720		
38	September 19, 1997	Princess Mononoke †	305,524,722		
39	September 26, 1997	Princess Mononoke †	250,858,894		
40	October 3, 1997	Princess Mononoke †	181,784,592		
41	October 10, 1997	Princess Mononoke †	151,371,605		
42	October 17, 1997	Princess Mononoke †	116,834,575		
43	October 24, 1997	Volcano	187,827,816		
44	October 31, 1997	Con Air	207,579,360		
45	November 7, 1997	Con Air	157,339,320		
46	November 14, 1997	Con Air	104,783,500		
47	November 21, 1997	Donnie Brasco	131,976,558		
48	November 28, 1997	Donnie Brasco	132,227,064		
49	December 5, 1997	Air Force One	330,090,670		
50	December 12, 1997	Men in Black	434,922,540		
51	December 19, 1997	Men in Black	520,000,000		
52	December 26, 1997	Titanic	510,000,000		

== Highest-grossing films ==
Rank	Title	Distributor	Distributor income (¥ million)
1.	Princess Mononoke	Toho	11,760
2.	Independence Day	20th Century Fox	6,650
3.	The Lost World: Jurassic Park	UIP	5,800
4.	Lost Paradise	Toei	2,300
5.	Doraemon: Nobita and the Spiral City	Toho	2,000
6.	Speed 2	20th Century Fox	2,000
7.	Star Wars (Special Edition)	20th Century Fox	1,900
8.	The Empire Strikes Back (Special Edition)	20th Century Fox	1,900
9.	Return of the Jedi (Special Edition)	20th Century Fox	1,900
10.	The Fifth Element	Herald	1,700
11.	Sleepers	Herald	1,500
12.	The End of Evangelion	Toei	1,450

== See also ==
- Lists of box office number-one films
