= List of 2020 box office number-one films in Paraguay =

The following is a list of 2020 box office number-one films in Paraguay.

== Films ==
†	This implies the highest-grossing movie of the year.

Week	Week ending	Film	Tickets sold	Ref.
1	January 1, 2019	Frozen II	9.386	
2	January 8, 2020	Jumanji: The Next Level	19.197	
3	January 15, 2020	Jumanji: The Next Level	13.938	
4	January 22, 2020	Jumanji: The Next Level	7.714	
5	January 29, 2020	Bad Boys for Life †	10.651	
6	February 5, 2020	Bad Boys for Life †	7.890	
7	February 12, 2020	Birds of Prey	9.804	
8	February 19, 2020	Sonic the Hedgehog	17.419	
9	February 26, 2020	Sonic the Hedgehog	9.008	
10	March 4, 2020	Sonic the Hedgehog	6.584	
11	March 11, 2020	Matar a un muerto	6.087	
12 ~ 46	March 18, 2020 to November 11, 2020	Box office reporting suspended due to the COVID-19 pandemic		
47	November 18, 2020	Break the Silence: The Movie	3.399	

== See also ==
- Lists of box office number-one films
- 2020 in film
