= List of 2019 box office number-one films in Paraguay =

The following is a list of 2019 box office number-one films in Paraguay.

== Films ==
†	This implies the highest-grossing movie of the year.

Week	Week ending	Film	Tickets sold	Ref.
1	January 2, 2019	Aquaman	21,607	
2	January 9, 2019	Aquaman	17,440	
3	January 16, 2019	Dragon Ball Super: Broly	54,242	
4	January 23, 2019	Glass	13,527	
5	January 30, 2019	How to Train Your Dragon: The Hidden World	14,854	
6	February 6, 2019	How to Train Your Dragon: The Hidden World	9,717	
7	February 13, 2019	How to Train Your Dragon: The Hidden World	5,664	
8	February 20, 2019	Happy Death Day 2U	9,308	
9	February 27, 2019	A Dog's Way Home	6,105	
10	March 6, 2019	A Dog's Way Home	4,748	
11	March 13, 2019	Captain Marvel	54,138	
12	March 20, 2019	Captain Marvel	28,981	
13	March 27, 2019	Captain Marvel	12,695	
14	April 3, 2019	Dumbo	19,152	
15	April 10, 2019	Shazam!	11,837	
16	April 17, 2019	Dumbo	7,114	
17	April 24, 2019	The Curse of La Llorona	7,798	
18	May 1, 2019	Avengers: Endgame †	158,263	
19	May 8, 2019	Avengers: Endgame †	56.375	
20	May 15, 2019	Avengers: Endgame †	26.026	
21	May 22, 2019	Avengers: Endgame †	9.482	
22	May 29, 2019	Aladdin	13.053	
23	June 5, 2019	Aladdin	12.452	
24	June 12, 2019	Aladdin	9.406	
25	June 19, 2019	Aladdin	7.920	
26	June 26, 2019	Toy Story 4	48.097	
27	July 3, 2019	Toy Story 4	39.886	
28	July 10, 2019	Spider-Man: Far From Home	34.080	
29	July 17, 2019	Toy Story 4	27.616	
30	July 24, 2019	The Lion King	50.831	
31	July 31, 2019	The Lion King	25.900	
32	August 7, 2019	Hobbs & Shaw	24.276	
33	August 14, 2019	Hobbs & Shaw	10.826	
34	August 21, 2019	The Lion King	10.538	
35	August 28, 2019	Morgue	22.943	
36	September 4, 2019	Morgue	17.238	
37	September 11, 2019	It Chapter Two	24.807	
38	September 18, 2019	It Chapter Two	11.679	
39	September 25, 2019	It Chapter Two	5.430	
40	October 2, 2019	Abominable	4.142	
41	October 9, 2019	Joker	49.468	
42	October 16, 2019	Joker	38.051	
43	October 23, 2019	Joker	21.517	
44	October 30, 2019	Maleficent: Mistress of Evil	11.462	
45	November 6, 2019	Maleficent: Mistress of Evil	8.222	
46	November 13, 2019	Maleficent: Mistress of Evil	5.492	
47	November 20, 2019	Maleficent: Mistress of Evil	4.371	
48	November 27, 2019	Maleficent: Mistress of Evil	3.439	
49	December 4, 2019	Maleficent: Mistress of Evil	3.850	
50	December 11, 2019	Frozen 2	31.103	
51	December 18, 2019	Frozen 2	18.500	
52	December 25, 2019	Star Wars: The Rise of Skywalker	31.780	

== Biggest opening week ==
This list charts films that had openings in excess of 50,000 tickets sold in their first week.

Rank	Film	Tickets sold	Week ending
1	Avengers: Endgame	158,263	May 1, 2019
2	Dragon Ball Super: Broly	54,242	January 16, 2019
3	Captain Marvel	54,138	March 13, 2019
4	The Lion King	50,831	July 24, 2019

== See also ==
- Lists of box office number-one films
- 2019 in film
