= List of 2007 box office number-one films in Japan =

This is a list of films which have placed number one at the weekend box office in Japan during 2007.

== Number-one films ==
†	This implies the highest-grossing movie of the year.

#	Weekend end date	Film	Total weekend gross	Notes
1	January 7, 2007	Letters from Iwo Jima	$10,189,235	
2	January 14, 2007	Love Never to End	$8,465,436	
3	January 21, 2007	The Departed	$11,013,212	
4	January 28, 2007	Dororo	$13,765,039	
5	February 4, 2007	Dororo	$11,220,977	
6	February 11, 2007	Dororo	$11,220,977	
7	February 18, 2007	Dororo	$11,128,446	
8	February 25, 2007	Dreamgirls	$6,961,033	
9	March 4, 2007	Genghis Khan: To the Ends of the Earth and Sea	$9,390,309	
10	March 11, 2007	Doraemon the Movie: Nobita's New Great Adventure Into the Underworld – The Seven Magic Users	$12,268,710	
11	March 18, 2007	Night at the Museum	$18,409,754	
12	March 25, 2007	Night at the Museum	$14,017,426	
13	April 1, 2007	Night at the Museum	$13,402,470	
14	April 8, 2007	Night at the Museum	$8,680,944	
15	April 15, 2007	Tôkyô tawâ: Okan to boku to, tokidoki, oton	$9,160,723	
16	April 22, 2007	Detective Conan: Jolly Roger in the Deep Azure	$14,869,039	
17	April 29, 2007	Detective Conan: Jolly Roger in the Deep Azure	$14,548,439	
18	May 6, 2007	Spider-Man 3	$24,608,127	
19	May 13, 2007	Spider-Man 3	$13,075,682	
20	May 20, 2007	Spider-Man 3	$10,954,355	
21	May 27, 2007	Pirates of the Caribbean: At World's End †	$19,094,909	
22	June 3, 2007	Pirates of the Caribbean: At World's End †	$18,210,930	
23	June 10, 2007	Pirates of the Caribbean: At World's End †	$17,253,828	
24	June 17, 2007	Pirates of the Caribbean: At World's End †	$13,490,441	
25	June 24, 2007	Pirates of the Caribbean: At World's End †	$11,166,924	
26	July 1, 2007	Live Free or Die Hard	$15,671,174	
27	July 8, 2007	Live Free or Die Hard	$11,135,309	
28	July 15, 2007	Pokémon: The Rise of Darkrai	$18,081,039	
29	July 22, 2007	Harry Potter and the Order of the Phoenix	$27,523,275	
30	July 29, 2007	Harry Potter and the Order of the Phoenix	$17,383,647	
31	August 5, 2007	Transformers	$20,853,730	
32	August 12, 2007	Ocean's Thirteen	$19,967,393	
33	August 19, 2007	Harry Potter and the Order of the Phoenix	$15,147,264	
34	August 26, 2007	Rush Hour 3	$13,902,938	
35	September 2, 2007	Evangelion: 1.0 You Are (Not) Alone	$13,952,081	
36	September 9, 2007	Hero	$17,124,971	
37	September 16, 2007	Hero	$14,172,255	
38	September 23, 2007	Hero	$11,912,823	
39	September 30, 2007	Hero	$9,379,683	
40	October 7, 2007	Hero	$6,396,132	
41	October 14, 2007	Hero	$6,005,897	
42	October 21, 2007	Hero	$6,005,897	
43	October 28, 2007	Crows: Episode 0	$10,006,810	
44	November 4, 2007	Resident Evil: Extinction	$20,222,792	
45	November 11, 2007	Koizora	$20,181,697	
46	November 18, 2007	Koizora	$14,739,247	
47	November 25, 2007	Always zoku san-chôme no yûhi	$12,967,378	
48	December 2, 2007	Always zoku san-chôme no yûhi	$11,620,926	
49	December 9, 2007	Mari To Koinu No Monogatari	$10,124,133	
50	December 16, 2007	I Am Legend	$13,471,445	
51	December 23, 2007	I Am Legend	$14,713,380	

== Highest-grossing films ==
International film Japanese film

Highest-grossing films of 2007
Rank	Title	Gross
1	Pirates of the Caribbean: At World's End	¥10.90 billion ($92.57 million)
2	Harry Potter and the Order of the Phoenix	¥9.40 billion ($79.83 million)
3	Hero	¥8.15 billion ($69.21 million)
4	Spider-Man 3	¥7.12 billion ($60.47 million)
5	Letters from Iwo Jima	¥5.10 billion ($43.31 million)
6	Pokémon: The Rise of Darkrai	¥5.02 billion ($42.63 million)
7	Always: Sunset on Third Street 2	¥4.56 billion ($38.72 million)
8	Monkey Magic	¥4.37 billion ($37.11 million)
9	Love and Honor	¥4.11 billion ($34.9 million)
10	Transformers	¥4.01 billion ($34.05 million)
