= List of 2015 box office number-one films in Chile =

This is a list of films which placed number-one at the weekend box office in Chile during 2015. Amounts are in American dollars.

== Films ==
†	This implies the highest-grossing movie of the year.

#	Weekend end date	Film	Box office
2	January 11, 2015	Night at the Museum: Secret of the Tomb	—N/a
3	January 18, 2015	Penguins of Madagascar	$435,600
4	January 25, 2015	Penguins of Madagascar	$354,145
5	February 1, 2015	Taken 3	$433,875
6	February 8, 2015	The SpongeBob Movie: Sponge Out of Water	$404,131
7	February 15, 2015	Fifty Shades of Grey	$1,245,916
8	February 22, 2015	Fifty Shades of Grey	$428,720
9	March 1, 2015	Fifty Shades of Grey	$284,302
10	March 8, 2015	Fifty Shades of Grey	$183,646
11	March 15, 2015	Tinker Bell and the Legend of the NeverBeast	$109,990
12	March 22, 2015	The Divergent Series: Insurgent	$572,220
13	March 29, 2015	Home	$324,281
14	April 5, 2015	Furious 7	$2,726,205
15	April 12, 2015	Furious 7	$1,764,300
16	April 19, 2015	Furious 7	$1,012,585
17	April 26, 2015	Furious 7	$498,523
18	May 3, 2015	Avengers: Age of Ultron	$2,490,893
19	May 10, 2015	Avengers: Age of Ultron	$1,100,432
20	May 17, 2015	Avengers: Age of Ultron	$806,276
21	May 24, 2015	Avengers: Age of Ultron	$724,726
22	May 31, 2015	San Andreas	$1,341,384
23	June 7, 2015	San Andreas	$1,306,176
24	June 14, 2015	Jurassic World	$1,288,056
25	June 21, 2015	Inside Out	$935,641
26	June 28, 2015	Inside Out	$982,488
27	July 5, 2015	Inside Out	$661,175
28	July 12, 2015	Minions †	$2,088,357
29	July 19, 2015	Minions †	$2,261,618
30	July 26, 2015	Minions †	$1,403,072
31	August 2, 2015	Minions †	$556,221
32	August 9, 2015	The 33	$1,573,622
33	August 16, 2015	The 33	$953,400
34	August 23, 2015	The 33	$613,313
35	August 30, 2015	The 33	$413,797
36	September 6, 2015	The 33	$226,397
37	September 13, 2015	Maze Runner: The Scorch Trials	$426,488
38	September 20, 2015	Maze Runner: The Scorch Trials	$325,860
39	September 27, 2015	Hotel Transylvania 2	$913,918
40	October 4, 2015	Hotel Transylvania 2	$732,541
41	October 11, 2015	Hotel Transylvania 2	$455,402
42	October 18, 2015	Hotel Transylvania 2	$353,567
43	October 25, 2015	Paranormal Activity: The Ghost Dimension	$291,344
44	November 1, 2015	Goosebumps	$157,613
45	November 8, 2015	Spectre	$333,412
46	November 15, 2015	Spectre	$204,944
47	November 22, 2015	The Hunger Games: Mockingjay – Part 2	$922,248
48	November 29, 2015	The Hunger Games: Mockingjay – Part 2	$545,848
49	December 6, 2015	The Good Dinosaur	$388,587
50	December 13, 2015	The Good Dinosaur	$265,634
51	December 20, 2015	Star Wars: The Force Awakens	$2,338,662
52	December 27, 2015	Star Wars: The Force Awakens	$1,401,962

== Highest-grossing films ==
Highest-grossing films of 2015
Rank	Title	Distributor	Domestic gross
1	Minions	Universal	$10,244,790
2	Furious 7	Universal	$9,659,056
3	Star Wars: The Force Awakens	Disney	$8,463,006
4	Inside Out	Disney	$7,434,521
5	Avengers: Age of Ultron	Disney	$6,942,365
6	Jurassic World	Universal	$6,077,033
7	San Andreas	Fox	$5,761,109
8	The 33	Fox	$4,937,597
9	Hotel Transylvania 2	Sony	$3,989,196
10	Fifty Shades of Grey	Universal	$3,481,152
