= List of 2010 box office number-one films in Turkey =

This is a list of films which have placed number one at the weekly box office in Turkey during 2010. The weeks start on Fridays, and finish on Thursdays. The box-office number one is established in terms of tickets sold during the week.

== Highest-grossing films ==
=== In-Year Release ===
Highest-grossing films of 2010 by In-year release
Rank	Title	Distributor	Domestic gross
1	Five Minarets in New York	Pin.	₺31.496.595
2.	Recep İvedik 3	Özen	₺28.710.632
3.	Eyyvah Eyvah	UIP	₺21.723.367
4.	Yahşi Batı	UIP	₺20.856.555
5.	Hunting Season	Warner Bros.	₺20.856.555
5.	Inception	Warner Bros.	₺11.030.417
6.	Çok Filim Hareketler Bunlar	MVZ	₺9.498.739
7.	The Twilight Saga: Eclipse	Tiglon	₺8.649.021
8.	Veda	Tiglon	₺8.256.873
9.	Harry Potter and the Deathly Hallows – Part 1	Warner Bros.	₺7.513.707
10.	Kutsal Damacana 2: İtmen	Özen	₺7.513.707
