= List of 2005 box office number-one films in Japan =

This is a list of films which have placed number one at the weekend box office in Japan during 2005.

== Chart/Gross List ==
†	This implies the highest-grossing movie of the year.

#	Weekend End Date	Film	Total Weekend Gross	Notes
1	January 2, 2005	Howl's Moving Castle †	$17,796,006	
2	January 9, 2005	Howl's Moving Castle †	$14,451,460	
3	January 16, 2005	Howl's Moving Castle †	$12,109,245	
4	January 23, 2005	Ocean's Twelve	$16,631,674	
5	January 30, 2005	Ocean's Twelve	$16,095,212	
6	February 6, 2005	The Phantom of the Opera	$14,504,003	
7	February 13, 2005	The Bourne Supremacy	$14,063,154	
8	February 20, 2005	The Bourne Supremacy	$9,279,190	
9	February 27, 2005	The Phantom of the Opera	$8,946,676	
10	March 6, 2005	Shark Tale	$10,918,797	
11	March 13, 2005	Rockman EXE & Duel Masters	$12,708,498	
12	March 20, 2005	National Treasure	$11,666,763	
13	March 27, 2005	National Treasure	$9,488,042	
14	April 3, 2005	National Treasure	$8,686,572	
15	April 10, 2005	Detective Conan: Strategy Above the Depths	$7,384,173	
16	April 17, 2005	Constantine	$14,859,234	
17	April 24, 2005	Constantine	$12,565,553	
18	May 1, 2005	Constantine	$13,499,378	
19	May 8, 2005	Koshonin Mashita Masayoshi	$13,575,874	
20	May 15, 2005	Koshonin Mashita Masayoshi	$11,052,795	
21	May 22, 2005	Koshonin Mashita Masayoshi	$9,755,250	
22	May 29, 2005	Koshonin Mashita Masayoshi	$9,006,342	
23	June 5, 2005	The Forgotten	$1,339,280	
24	June 12, 2005	Sengoku Jieitai 1549	$13,225,26	
25	June 19, 2005	Batman Begins	$11,575,136	
26	June 26, 2005	War of the Worlds	$20,191,820	
27	July 3, 2005	Star Wars: Episode III – Revenge of the Sith	$32,216,158	
28	July 10, 2005	Star Wars: Episode III – Revenge of the Sith	$16,028,098	
29	July 17, 2005	Star Wars: Episode III – Revenge of the Sith	$11,356,792	
30	July 24, 2005	Star Wars: Episode III – Revenge of the Sith	$14,226,192	
31	July 31, 2005	Star Wars: Episode III – Revenge of the Sith	$9,719,118	
32	August 7, 2005	Star Wars: Episode III – Revenge of the Sith	$16,064,791	
33	August 14, 2005	Madagascar	$11,568,323	
34	August 21, 2005	Madagascar	$9,199,454	
35	August 28, 2005	The Suspect Muroi Shinji	$9,213,992	
36	September 4, 2005	Charlie and the Chocolate Factory	$21,218,964	
37	September 11, 2005	Charlie and the Chocolate Factory	$15,344,119	
38	September 18, 2005	Charlie and the Chocolate Factory	$15,344,119	
39	September 25, 2005	Charlie and the Chocolate Factory	$11,590,356	
40	October 2, 2005	Charlie and the Chocolate Factory	$10,774,600	
41	October 9, 2005	Stealth	$2,134,210	
42	October 16, 2005	Charlie and the Chocolate Factory	$7,929,885	
43	October 23, 2005	Corpse Bride	$6,913,660	
44	October 30, 2005	A Moment to Remember	$9,485,907	
45	November 6, 2005	The Brothers Grimm	$10,534,554	
46	November 13, 2005	Always Sanchōme no Yūhi	$8,158,913	
47	November 20, 2005	Always Sanchōme no Yūhi	$5,816,461	
48	November 27, 2005	Harry Potter and the Goblet of Fire	$15,677,146	
49	December 4, 2005	Harry Potter and the Goblet of Fire	$16,548,704	
50	December 11, 2005	Harry Potter and the Goblet of Fire	$16,842,314	
51	December 18, 2005	Harry Potter and the Goblet of Fire	$12,568,150	
52	December 25, 2005	Harry Potter and the Goblet of Fire	$16,755,802	
