= List of 2021 box office number-one films in Poland =

This is a list of films which have placed number one at the weekend box office in Poland during 2021.

== Number-one films ==
Spider-Man: No Way Home became the highest grossing film of 2021 despite not reaching #1.

Date	Film	Gross	Notes
January 1, 2021 – February 5, 2021	Polish cinemas closed and box office reporting suspended due to the COVID-19 pandemic		
February 12, 2021	The Secret Garden	$27,962	
February 19, 2021	The Secret Garden	$33,820	
February 26, 2021	Palm Springs	$83,412	
March 5, 2021	Soul	$128,974	
March 12, 2021	Soul	$159,678	
March 19, 2021	Promising Young Woman	$59,000	
March 26, 2021	Promising Young Woman	$21,000	
April 2, 2021 – May 14, 2021	Polish cinemas closed and box office reporting suspended due to the COVID-19 pandemic		
May 21, 2021	Soul	$115,895	
May 28, 2021	Cruella	$207,673	
June 4, 2021	Cruella	$189,409	
June 11, 2021	Cruella	$204,685	
June 18, 2021	Luca	$136,783	
June 25, 2021	F9	$893,000	
July 2, 2021	Luca	$283,696	
July 9, 2021	Black Widow	$780,747	
July 16, 2021	Space Jam: A New Legacy	$536,000	
July 23, 2021	Space Jam: A New Legacy	$168,082	
July 30, 2021	Jungle Cruise	$315,462	
August 6, 2021	Jungle Cruise	$215,138	
August 13, 2021	Free Guy	$238,803	
August 20, 2021	Free Guy	$237,420	
August 27, 2021	Free Guy	$207,920	
September 3, 2021	Shang-Chi and the Legend of the Ten Rings	$493,547	
September 10, 2021	Cruella	$333,218	
September 17, 2021	Shang-Chi and the Legend of the Ten Rings	$253,687	
September 24, 2021	Shang-Chi and the Legend of the Ten Rings	$148,457	
October 1, 2021	No Time to Die	$2,335,391	
October 8, 2021	No Time to Die	$1,409,999	
October 15, 2021	No Time to Die	$918,870	
October 22, 2021	Dune	$1,240,201	
October 29, 2021	Antlers	$200,745	
November 5, 2021	Eternals	$709,379	
November 12, 2021	Pitbull	$830,491	
November 19, 2021	Pitbull	$372,745	
November 26, 2021	Encanto	$272,324	
December 3, 2021	Encanto	$226,579	
December 10, 2021	Girls to Buy	$568,971	
December 17, 2021	Girls to Buy	$267,486	
December 24, 2021	The Matrix Resurrections	$240,561	
December 31 2021	Encanto	$50,599	

== See also ==
- List of Polish films — Polish films by year
