= List of 2008 box office number-one films in Turkey =

This is a list of films which have placed number one at the weekly box office in Turkey during 2008. The weeks start on Fridays, and finish on Thursdays. The box-office number one is established in terms of tickets sold during the week.

== Highest-grossing films ==
=== In-Year Release ===
Highest-grossing films of 2008 by In-year release
| Rank | Title | Distributor | Domestic gross |
|---|---|---|---|
| 1. | Recep İvedik | Özen | ₺30.172.270 |
| 2. | A.R.O.G | UIP | ₺28.597.761 |
| 3. | Alone | CF | ₺17.582.365 |
| 4. | Muro: Damn the Humanist Inside | Özen | ₺17.085.425 |
| 5. | The Ottoman Republic | UIP | ₺11.365.870 |
| 6. | Mustafa | Warner Bros. | ₺8.498.535 |
| 7. | The Masked Gang: Cyprus | UIP | ₺6.795.141 |
| 8. | Cool School Camp | Özen | ₺6.314.199 |
| 9. | O... Çocukları | KenDa | ₺5.309.235 |
| 10. | 120 | Özen | ₺5.019.833 |
