= List of 2019 box office number-one films in Brazil =

This is a list of films which placed number-one at the weekend box office in Brazil during 2019.

== Number-one films ==
†	This implies the highest-grossing movie of the year.

#	Weekend end date	Film	Box office
1	January 6, 2019	Ralph Breaks the Internet	US$4,825,895
2	January 13, 2019	Spider-Man: Into the Spider-Verse	US$2,797,140
3	January 20, 2019	How to Train Your Dragon: The Hidden World	US$3,347,761
4	January 27, 2019	How to Train Your Dragon: The Hidden World	US$2,099,122
5	February 3, 2019	How to Train Your Dragon: The Hidden World	US$1,661,375
6	February 10, 2019	How to Train Your Dragon: The Hidden World	US$1,017,898
7	February 17, 2019	Alita: Battle Angel	US$1,593,835
8	February 24, 2019	Alita: Battle Angel	US$783,876.54
9	March 3, 2019	A Dog's Way Home	US$614,357.21
10	March 10, 2019	Captain Marvel	US$13,258,157
11	March 17, 2019	Captain Marvel	US$7,440,576
12	March 24, 2019	Captain Marvel	US$3,829,102
13	March 31, 2019	Dumbo	US$2,723,018
14	April 7, 2019	Shazam!	US$4,721,722
15	April 14, 2019	Shazam!	US$2,361,957
16	April 21, 2019	Shazam!	US$1,675,462.8
17	April 28, 2019	Avengers: Endgame †	US$26,363,627
18	May 5, 2019	Avengers: Endgame †	US$15,808,360
19	May 12, 2019	Avengers: Endgame †	US$8,749,062
20	May 19, 2019	Avengers: Endgame †	US$4,240,031
21	May 26, 2019	Aladdin	US$4,680,838
22	June 2, 2019	Aladdin	US$3,953,665
23	June 9, 2019	Dark Phoenix	US$2,764,000
24	June 16, 2019	Aladdin	US$1,847,796
25	June 23, 2019	Toy Story 4	US$9,341,080
26	June 30, 2019	Toy Story 4	US$4,264,079
27	July 7, 2019	Spider-Man: Far From Home	US$8,001,298
28	July 14, 2019	Spider-Man: Far From Home	US$4,712,591
29	July 21, 2019	The Lion King	US$18,323,966
30	July 28, 2019	The Lion King	US$12,941,514
31	August 4, 2019	The Lion King	US$6,361,281
32	August 11, 2019	The Lion King	US$3,698,165
33	August 18, 2019	Nada a Perder 2	US$3,610,407
34	August 25, 2019	Nada a Perder 2	US$2,458,695
35	September 1, 2019	Nada a Perder 2	US$1,625,418
36	September 8, 2019	It Chapter Two	US$4,225,056
37	September 15, 2019	It Chapter Two	US$2,260,066
38	September 22, 2019	It Chapter Two	US$1,179,174
39	September 29, 2019	Abominable	US$1,087,934
40	October 6, 2019	Joker	US$7,273,326
41	October 13, 2019	Joker	US$6,562,194
42	October 20, 2019	Maleficent: Mistress of Evil	US$4,458,534
43	October 27, 2019	Maleficent: Mistress of Evil	US$3,499,157
44	November 3, 2019	Maleficent: Mistress of Evil	US$2,475,395
45	November 10, 2019	Maleficent: Mistress of Evil	US$1,730,971
46	November 17, 2019	Maleficent: Mistress of Evil	US$1,471,210
47	November 24, 2019	Maleficent: Mistress of Evil	US$540,199
48	December 1, 2019	Last Christmas	US$601,014
49	December 8, 2019	Maleficent: Mistress of Evil	US$413,194
50	December 15, 2019	Knives Out	US$1,081,465
51	December 22, 2019	Star Wars: The Rise of Skywalker	US$5,941,188
52	December 29, 2019	My Mom Is a Character 3	US$7,665,728

== Highest-grossing films ==
Highest-grossing films of 2019 (in-year releases)
Rank	Title	Distributor	Domestic gross
1	Avengers: Endgame	Disney	$85,667,373
2	The Lion King	Disney	$69,468,012
3	Captain Marvel	Disney	$38,152,771
4	Joker	Warner Bros.	$38,102,856
5	Toy Story 4	Disney	$32,659,805
6	Spider-Man: Far from Home	Sony	$28,317,380
7	My Mom is a Character 3	Downtown Filmes	$24,092,433
8	Maleficent: Mistress of Evil	Disney	$22,322,916
9	Aladdin	Disney	$19,900,375
10	Ralph Breaks the Internet	Disney	$17,332,960
11	How to Train Your Dragon: The Hidden World	Universal	$15,668,517
12	Dark Phoenix	Disney	$13,778,120.93
12	Nada a Perder 2	Paris Filmes	$13,730,246
14	Shazam!	Warner Bros.	$12,016,745
15	It Chapter Two	Warner Bros.	$11,600,000
16	Fast & Furious Presents: Hobbs & Shaw	Universal	$11,210,142
17	Star Wars: Episode IX - The Rise of Skywalker	Disney	$9,604,684
18	Spider-Man: Into the Spider-Verse	Sony	$8,408,623
19	Monica and Friends: Bonds	Paris Filmes	$7,704,901.51
20	Dumbo	Disney	$7,619,182
