= List of 2004 box office number-one films in Japan =

The following is a list of 2004 box office number-one films in Japan. When the number-one film in gross is not the same as the number-one film in admissions, both are listed.

== Number-one films ==
†	This implies the highest-grossing movie of the year.

#	Date	Film	Gross	Notes
1	January 4, 2004	Finding Nemo	US$7.8 million	
2	January 11, 2004	The Last Samurai	US$5.6 million	
3	January 18, 2004	The Last Samurai	US$3.8 million	
4	January 25, 2004	The Last Samurai	US$3.2 million	
5	February 1, 2004	The Last Samurai	US$3.9 million	
6	February 8, 2004	The Last Samurai	US$2.7 million	
7	February 15, 2004	The Lord of the Rings: The Return of the King	US$14.7 million	
8	February 22, 2004	The Lord of the Rings: The Return of the King	US$7.5 million	
9	February 29, 2004	The Lord of the Rings: The Return of the King	US$6.5 million	
10	March 7, 2004	The Lord of the Rings: The Return of the King	US$4.7 million	
11	March 14, 2004	The Lord of the Rings: The Return of the King	US$3.9 million	
12	March 21, 2004	The Lord of the Rings: The Return of the King	US$3.5 million	
13	March 28, 2004	The Lord of the Rings: The Return of the King	US$2.7 million	
14	April 4, 2004	Doraemon: Nobita in the Wan-Nyan Spacetime Odyssey	US$2.3 million	
15	April 11, 2004	The Lord of the Rings: The Return of the King	US$1.6 million	
16	April 18, 2004	Detective Conan: Magician of the Silver Sky	US$3.7 million	
17	April 25, 2004	The Haunted Mansion	US$4.6 million	
18	May 2, 2004	The Haunted Mansion	US$4.2 million	
19	May 9, 2004	Crying Out Love, in the Center of the World	US$5.5 million	
20	May 16, 2004	Crying Out Love, in the Center of the World	US$5 million	
21	May 23, 2004	Troy	US$6 million	
22	May 30, 2004	Troy	US$4 million	
23	June 6, 2004	The Day After Tomorrow	US$10 million	
24	June 13, 2004	The Day After Tomorrow	US$5 million	
25	June 20, 2004	The Day After Tomorrow	US$3 million	
26	July 4, 2004	Harry Potter and the Prisoner of Azkaban	US$11.5 million	
27	July 11, 2004	Spider-Man 2	US$10 million	
28	July 18, 2004	Harry Potter and the Prisoner of Azkaban	US$6 million	
29	July 25, 2004	Harry Potter and the Prisoner of Azkaban	US$4 million	
30	August 1, 2004	Harry Potter and the Prisoner of Azkaban	US$4 million	
31	August 8, 2004	Harry Potter and the Prisoner of Azkaban	US$2.5 million	
32	August 15, 2004	Harry Potter and the Prisoner of Azkaban	US$3.7 million	
33	August 21, 2004	Naruto the Movie: Ninja Clash in the Land of Snow	US$3.2 million	
34	August 29, 2004	House of Flying Daggers	US$3.6 million	
35	September 5, 2004	Van Helsing	US$5.7 million	
36	September 12, 2004	Resident Evil: Apocalypse	US$5.9 million	
37	September 19, 2004	I, Robot	US$6.6 million	
38	September 26, 2004	I, Robot	US$3.1 million	
39	October 3, 2004	I, Robot	US$2.4 million	
40	October 10, 2004	I, Robot	US$2.2 million	
41	October 17, 2004	I, Robot	US$1.3 million	
42	October 24, 2004	Secret Window	US$1.4 million	
43	October 31, 2004	Collateral	US$3.9 million	
44	November 7, 2004	Be with You	US$2.7 million	
45	November 14, 2004	Be with You	US$3.3 million	
46	November 21, 2004	Howl's Moving Castle †	US$14 million	
47	November 28, 2004	Howl's Moving Castle †	US$11.7 million	
48	December 5, 2004	Howl's Moving Castle †	US$9.8 million	
49	December 12, 2004	Howl's Moving Castle †	US$9.2 million	
