= List of 2010 box office number-one films in Poland =

This is a list of films which have placed number one at the weekend box office in Poland during 2010.

== Number-one films ==
†	This implies the highest-grossing movie of the year.

#	Date	Film	Gross	Notes
1	January 3, 2010	Avatar	$2,941,552	
2	January 10, 2010	Avatar	$2,271,580	
3	January 17, 2010	Avatar	$1,943,351	
4	January 24, 2010	Avatar	$1,632,087	
5	January 31, 2010	Avatar	$1,440,446	
6	February 7, 2010	Avatar	$1,231,132	
7	February 14, 2010	Randka w ciemno	$1,342,325	Randka w ciemno reached No. 1 in its second weekend of release.
8	February 21, 2010	Avatar	$938,836	
9	February 28, 2010	Avatar	$792,168	
10	March 7, 2010	Alice in Wonderland †	$2,006,542	
11	March 14, 2010	Alice in Wonderland †	$1,508,310	
12	March 21, 2010	Alice in Wonderland †	$905,050	
13	March 28, 2010	Alice in Wonderland †	$507,952	
14	April 4, 2010	Alice in Wonderland †	$120,908	
15	April 11, 2010	Clash of the Titans	$572,559	
16	April 18, 2010	How to Train Your Dragon	$258,460	
17	April 25, 2010	How to Train Your Dragon	$708,640	
18	May 2, 2010	How to Train Your Dragon	$639,451	
19	May 9, 2010	How to Train Your Dragon	$335,097	
20	May 16, 2010	Robin Hood	$1,065,354	
21	May 23, 2010	Prince of Persia: The Sands of Time	$641,128	
22	May 30, 2010	Disco ormene	$535,978	
23	June 6, 2010	Disco ormene	$275,572	
24	June 13, 2010	Disco ormene	$135,498	
25	June 20, 2010	Toy Story 3	$906,486	
26	June 27, 2010	Toy Story 3	$483,072	
27	July 4, 2010	The Twilight Saga: Eclipse	$838,330	
28	July 11, 2010	Shrek Forever After	$2,625,401	Shrek Forever After had the highest weekend debut of 2010.
29	July 18, 2010	Shrek Forever After	$2,274,107	
30	July 25, 2010	Shrek Forever After	$1,796,513	
31	August 1, 2010	Inception	$975,339	
32	August 8, 2010	Step Up 3D	$1,001,622	
33	August 15, 2010	Step Up 3D	$525,679	
34	August 22, 2010	Despicable Me	$372,571	
35	August 29, 2010	Salt	$562,415	
36	September 5, 2010	The Last Airbender	$430,373	
37	September 12, 2010	Resident Evil: Afterlife	$494,633	
38	September 19, 2010	Space Dogs 3D	$270,770	
39	September 26, 2010	StreetDance 3D	$350,403	
40	October 3, 2010	Sammy's Adventures: The Secret Passage	$482,542	
41	October 10, 2010	Maiden Vows	$1,065,220	
42	October 17, 2010	Maiden Vows	$934,494	
43	October 24, 2010	Maiden Vows	$526,259	
44	October 31, 2010	Saw 3D	$822,321	
45	November 7, 2010	Saw 3D	$449,559	
46	November 14, 2010	Śniadanie do łóżka	$733,062	
47	November 21, 2010	Harry Potter and the Deathly Hallows – Part 1	$2,499,386	
48	November 28, 2010	Harry Potter and the Deathly Hallows – Part 1	$1,069,927	
49	December 5, 2010	Tangled	$718,509	Tangled reached No. 1 in its second weekend of release.
50	December 12, 2010	Tangled	$537,004	
51	December 19, 2010	Tangled	$266,155	
52	December 26, 2010	The Chronicles of Narnia: The Voyage of the Dawn Treader	$292,380	
53	January 2, 2011	The Chronicles of Narnia: The Voyage of the Dawn Treader	$436,993	

== See also ==
- List of Polish films — Polish films by year
