= List of 2011 box office number-one films in Turkey =

This is a list of films which have placed number one at the weekly box office in Turkey during 2011. The weeks start on Fridays, and finish on Thursdays. The box-office number one is established in terms of tickets sold during the week.

== Box office number-one films ==
†	This implies the highest-grossing movie of the year.

#	Date	Film	Tickets sold
1	January 6, 2011	Hunting Season	182,375
2	January 13, 2011	Eyyvah Eyvah 2 †	1,226,037
3	January 20, 2011	Eyyvah Eyvah 2 †	894,074
4	January 27, 2011	Eyyvah Eyvah 2 †	605,495
5	February 3, 2011	Valley of the Wolves: Palestine	1,060,415
6	February 10, 2011	Love Likes Coincidences	621,583
7	February 17, 2011	Love Likes Coincidences	620,587
8	February 24, 2011	Love Likes Coincidences	415,293
9	March 3, 2011	Ya Sonra	334,860
10	March 10, 2011	Ya Sonra	219,284
11	March 17, 2011	Kolpaçino: Bomba	264,008
12	March 24, 2011	Kolpaçino: Bomba	164,978
13	March 31, 2011	Losers' Club	110,278
14	April 7, 2011	Losers' Club	106,719
15	April 14, 2011	Rio	103,644
16	April 21, 2011	Rio	88,345
17	April 28, 2011	Rio	90,215
18	May 5, 2011	Fast Five	250,263
19	May 12, 2011	Fast Five	162,494
20	May 19, 2011	Pirates of the Caribbean: On Stranger Tides	114,970
21	May 26, 2011	Pirates of the Caribbean: On Stranger Tides	354,325
22	June 2, 2011	Pirates of the Caribbean: On Stranger Tides	236,121
23	June 9, 2011	Pirates of the Caribbean: On Stranger Tides	154,240
24	June 16, 2011	Kung Fu Panda 2	116,198
25	June 23, 2011	Pirates of the Caribbean: On Stranger Tides	88,535
26	June 30, 2011	Transformers: Dark of the Moon	73,048
27	July 7, 2011	Transformers: Dark of the Moon	236,409
28	July 14, 2011	Harry Potter and the Deathly Hallows – Part 2	138,673
29	July 21, 2011	Harry Potter and the Deathly Hallows – Part 2	278,699
30	July 28, 2011	Harry Potter and the Deathly Hallows – Part 2	152,389
31	August 4, 2011	Harry Potter and the Deathly Hallows – Part 2	92,773
32	August 11, 2011	The Smurfs	396,289
33	August 18, 2011	The Smurfs	260,189
34	August 25, 2011	Cars 2	271,245
35	September 1, 2011	Cars 2	146,164
36	September 8, 2011	Captain America: The First Avenger	98,571
37	September 15, 2011	Final Destination 5	135,567
38	September 22, 2011	Final Destination 5	90,056
39	September 29, 2011	Final Destination 5	55,695
40	October 6, 2011	The Lion King (in 3D)	43,548
41	October 13, 2011	Real Steel	48,540
42	October 20, 2011	The Three Musketeers	50,953
43	October 27, 2011	Paranormal Activity 3	60,245
44	November 3, 2011	Anadolu Kartalları	231,121
45	November 10, 2011	Anadolu Kartalları	459,388
46	November 17, 2011	God's Faithful Servant: Barla	329,194
47	November 24, 2011	The Twilight Saga: Breaking Dawn – Part 1	649,738
48	December 1, 2011	The Twilight Saga: Breaking Dawn – Part 1	452,262
49	December 8, 2011	My Grandfather's People	302,149
50	December 15, 2011	My Grandfather's People	222,210
51	December 22, 2011	Sümela'nın Şifresi: Temel	351,575
52	December 29, 2011	Sümela'nın Şifresi: Temel	335,042

== Highest-grossing films ==
=== In-Year Release ===
Highest-grossing films of 2011 by In-year release
Rank	Title	Distributor	Domestic gross
1	Eyyvah Eyvah 2	UIP	₺36.678.019
2.	Love Likes Coincidences	UIP	₺21.910.790
3.	Valley of the Wolves: Palestine	Özen	₺17.293.396
4.	God's Faithful Servant: Barla	Özen	₺15.445.347
5.	Pirates of the Caribbean: On Stranger Tides	UIP	₺13.128.062
6.	The Twilight Saga: Breaking Dawn – Part 1	Tiglon	₺12.135.616
7.	The Smurs	Warner Bros.	₺11.503.084
8.	My Grandfather's People	Warner Bros.	₺10.255.354
9.	Anadolu Kartalları	Tiglon	₺10.217.302
10.	Harry Potter and the Deathly Hallows – Part 2	Warner Bros.	₺7.925.707
