= List of 2022 box office number-one films in Lithuania =

This is a list of films which have placed number one at the weekend box office in Lithuania during 2022.

== Number-one films ==
†	This implies the highest-grossing movie of the year.

#	Date	Film	Gross	Notes	Ref(s)
1	January 9, 2022	Vyras už pinigus	$125,243		
2	January 16, 2022	Vyras už pinigus	$85,093		
3	January 23, 2022	Vyras už pinigus	$34,000		
4	January 30, 2022	Vyras už pinigus	$25,806		
5	February 6, 2022	Moonfall	$58,870		
6	February 13, 2022	Marry Me	$38,323		
7	February 20, 2022	Uncharted	$80,560		
8	February 27, 2022	Uncharted	$40,845		
9	March 6, 2022	The Batman	$95,084		
10	March 13, 2022	The Batman	$78,651		
11	March 20, 2022	The Batman	$45,328		
12	March 27, 2022	The Batman	$31,864		
13	April 3, 2022	Sonic the Hedgehog 2	$78,010		
14	April 10, 2022	Sonic the Hedgehog 2	$71,948		
15	April 17, 2022	Fantastic Beasts: The Secrets of Dumbledore	$66,981		
16	April 24, 2022	Fantastic Beasts: The Secrets of Dumbledore	$74,261		
17	May 1, 2022	Fantastic Beasts: The Secrets of Dumbledore	$24,088		
18	May 8, 2022	Doctor Strange in the Multiverse of Madness	$148,720		
19	May 15, 2022	Doctor Strange in the Multiverse of Madness	$60,484		
20	May 22, 2022	Doctor Strange in the Multiverse of Madness	$40,952		
21	May 29, 2022	Top Gun: Maverick	$70,114		
22	June 5, 2022	Top Gun: Maverick	$35,861		
23	June 12, 2022	Jurassic World Dominion	$51,239		
24	June 19, 2022	Jurassic World Dominion	$36,589		
25	June 26, 2022	Kartą kaime	$35,959		
26	July 3, 2022	Minions: The Rise of Gru	$218,143		
27	July 10, 2022	Minions: The Rise of Gru	$147,787		
28	July 17, 2022	Minions: The Rise of Gru	$113,963		
29	July 24, 2022	Minions: The Rise of Gru	$53,499		
30	July 31, 2022	Minions: The Rise of Gru	$38,547		
31	August 7, 2022	Bullet Train	$36,508		
32	August 14, 2022	Minions: The Rise of Gru	$17,616		
33	August 21, 2022	Where the Crawdads Sing	$76,412		
34	August 28, 2022	Where the Crawdads Sing	$47,937		
35	September 4, 2022	Where the Crawdads Sing	TBA		
36	September 11, 2022	Where the Crawdads Sing	$50,134		
37	September 18, 2022	Ko nežino vyrai	$123,234		
38	September 25, 2022	Ko nežino vyrai	TBA		
39	October 2, 2022	Ko nežino vyrai	$56,949		
40	October 9, 2022	Ko nežino vyrai	$33,688		
41	October 16, 2022	The Generation of Evil	$100,780		
42	October 23, 2022	The Generation of Evil	$99,153		
43	October 30, 2022	The Generation of Evil	$93,700		
44	November 6, 2022	The Generation of Evil	$97,862		
45	November 13, 2022	Black Panther: Wakanda Forever	$103,565		
46	November 20, 2022	Black Panther: Wakanda Forever	$49,073		
47	November 27, 2022	Strange World	$42,124		
48	December 4, 2022	Strange World	$26,390		
49	December 11, 2022	Strange World	$18,638		
50	December 18, 2022	Avatar: The Way of Water †	$361,161		
51	December 25, 2022	Avatar: The Way of Water †	$98,868		
52	January 1, 2023	Avatar: The Way of Water †	$233,321		

== See also ==
- List of Lithuanian films — Lithuanian films by year
