= List of 2016 box office number-one films in Argentina =

This is a list of films which placed number-one at the weekend box office in Argentina during 2016. Amounts are in American dollars.

== Number-one albums ==
†	This implies the highest-grossing movie of the year.

#	Weekend end date	Film	Box office	Notes
1	January 3, 2016	Star Wars: The Force Awakens	$788,782	
2	January 10, 2016	Star Wars: The Force Awakens	$637,138	
3	January 17, 2016	Daddy's Home	$383,345	
4	January 24, 2016	The 5th Wave	$664,975	
5	January 31, 2016	The Revenant	$899,536	
6	February 7, 2016	The Revenant	$545,999	
7	February 14, 2016	Deadpool	$1,105,925	
8	February 21, 2016	Zootopia	$1,886,816	
9	February 28, 2016	Zootopia	$1,327,439	
10	March 6, 2016	Zootopia	$943,557	
11	March 13, 2016	Zootopia	$796,788	
12	March 20, 2016	Kung Fu Panda 3	$1,201,450	
13	March 27, 2016	Batman v Superman: Dawn of Justice	$3,050,823	
14	April 3, 2016	Batman v Superman: Dawn of Justice	$1,647,918	
15	April 10, 2016	The Jungle Book	$2,336,077	
16	April 17, 2016	The Jungle Book	$1,948,420	
17	April 24, 2016	The Jungle Book	$1,100,943	
18	May 1, 2016	The Jungle Book	$703,568	
19	May 8, 2016	Captain America: Civil War	$3,555,979	
20	May 15, 2016	Captain America: Civil War	$1,757,680	
21	May 22, 2016	El Hilo Rojo	$1,556,240	
22	May 29, 2016	Alice Through the Looking Glass	$1,531,973	
23	June 5, 2016	Alice Through the Looking Glass	$1,150,482	
24	June 12, 2016	The Conjuring 2	$2,861,202	
25	June 19, 2016	Finding Dory †	$3,525,829	
26	June 26, 2016	Finding Dory †	$2,183,486	
27	July 3, 2016	Finding Dory †	$2,182,212	
28	July 10, 2016	Ice Age: Collision Course	$3,778,858	
29	July 17, 2016	Ice Age: Collision Course	$2,782,784	
30	July 24, 2016	The Secret Life of Pets	$3,837,781	It currently has the highest weekend debut of 2016.
31	July 31, 2016	The Secret Life of Pets	$2,818,745	
32	August 7, 2016	The Secret Life of Pets	$1,058,254	
33	August 14, 2016	Suicide Squad	$2,504,513	
34	August 21, 2016	Suicide Squad	$1,284,410	
35	August 28, 2016	Suicide Squad	$673,274	

== Highest-grossing films ==
Highest-grossing films of 2016
Rank	Title	Distributor	Domestic gross
1.	Finding Dory	Disney	$17,156,464
2.	Ice Age: Collision Course	20th Century Fox	$15,323,312
3.	The Secret Life of Pets	Universal	$12,576,395
4.	The Conjuring 2	Warner Bros.	$9,840,814
5.	Me Casé con un Boludo	Disney	$9,638,427
6.	The Jungle Book	Disney	$9,479,611
7.	Captain America: Civil War	Disney	$9,005,829
8.	Zootopia	Disney	$8,875,360
9.	Batman v Superman: Dawn of Justice	Warner Bros.	$7,950,785
10.	Suicide Squad	Warner Bros.	$5,951,776

== See also ==
- List of American films — American films by year
- List of Argentine films — Argentine films by year
