= List of 2020 box office number-one films in Turkey =

This is a list of films which placed number one at the weekly box office in Turkey during 2020. The weeks start on Fridays, and finish on Thursdays. The box-office number one is established in terms of tickets sold during the week.

== Box office number-one films ==
†	This implies the highest-grossing movie of the year.

Week	End date for the week	Film	Gross (₺)	Tickets sold	Note(s)
1	January 2, 2020	Rafadan Tayfa Göbeklitepe	₺16,403,369	956,540	
2	January 9, 2020	Rafadan Tayfa Göbeklitepe	₺10,166,555	614,171	
3	January 16, 2020	Rafadan Tayfa Göbeklitepe	₺7,796,548	498,824	
4	January 23, 2020	Rafadan Tayfa Göbeklitepe	₺9,579,054	604,259	
5	January 30, 2020	Rafadan Tayfa Göbeklitepe	₺7,198,134	457,232	
6	February 6, 2020	Eltilerin Savaşı †	₺17,716,398	1,003,310	
7	February 13, 2020	Eltilerin Savaşı †	₺15,613,325	893,696	
8	February 20, 2020	Eltilerin Savaşı †	₺13,534,629	778,845	
9	February 27, 2020	Bayi Toplantısı	₺9,355,680	519,279	
10	March 5, 2020	Bayi Toplantısı	₺5,374,267	298,747	
11	March 12, 2020	Bayi Toplantısı	₺3,201,387	180,896	
12	March 19, 2020	Bloodshot	₺907,082	47,479	
13 - 27	Movie theaters shut down due to COVID-19				
28	July 9, 2020	Bizim İçin Şampiyon	₺13,146	1,314	
29	July 16, 2020	Miracle in Cell No. 7	₺24,957	2,451	
30	July 23, 2020	Miracle in Cell No. 7	₺42,663	4,204	
31	July 30, 2020	Annem	₺21,704	1,971	
32	August 6, 2020	Araf 4: Meryem	₺14,446	961	
33	August 13, 2020	Bloodshot	₺84,634	5,814	
34	August 20, 2020	Bloodshot	₺82,558	5,824	
35	August 27, 2020	Tenet	₺511,359	25,830	
36	September 3, 2020	Tenet	₺1,261,721	57,439	
37	September 10, 2020	Tenet	₺754,767	34,950	
38	September 17, 2020	Tenet	₺474,055	21,608	
39	September 24, 2020	Tenet	₺378,294	17,030	
40	October 1, 2020	Tenet	₺280,342	13,078	
41	October 8, 2020	Tenet	₺255,003	12,224	
42	October 15, 2020	Tenet	₺242,164	11,458	
43	October 22, 2020	Tenet	₺285,210	12,193	
44	October 29, 2020	Tenet	₺245,928	10,625	
45	November 5, 2020	Haunt	₺200,795	10,195	
46	November 12, 2020	Haunt	₺151,601	7,769	
47	November 19, 2020	İki Gözüm Ahmet	₺580,215	30,166	
48	November 26, 2020	İki Gözüm Ahmet	₺40,025	1,772	
49	December 3, 2020	İki Gözüm Ahmet	₺9,997	437	
50	December 10, 2020	İki Gözüm Ahmet	₺7,158	330	
51	December 17, 2020	Waiting for the Barbarians	₺4,470	164	
52	December 24, 2020	Follow Me	₺3,731	189	
53	December 31, 2020	Haunt	₺1,824	78	

== Highest-grossing films ==
=== In-Year Release ===
Highest-grossing films of 2020 by In-year release
Rank	Title	Distributor	Domestic gross
1	Eltilerin Savaşı	UIP	₺63.432.055
2.	Bayi Toplantısı	CJ ENM	₺18.713.968
3.	Sıfır Bir	CGV Mars	₺15.465.217
4.	Gamonya: Hayaller Ülkesi	CJ ENM	₺13.344.113
5.	Karakomik Filmler 2	UIP	₺8.502.120
6.	Love Likes Coincidences 2	CGV Mars	₺7.284.674
7.	Türkler Geliyor: Adaletin Kılıcı	CJ ENM	₺7.261.804
8.	Biz Böyleyiz	CJ ENM	₺7.081.668
9.	Birds of Prey	Warner Bros.	₺6.116.083
10.	Sonic the Hedgehog	UIP	₺5.556.318
