= List of 2019 box office number-one films in Turkey =

This is a list of films which placed number one at the weekly box office in Turkey during 2019. The weeks start on Fridays, and finish on Thursdays. The box-office number one is established in terms of tickets sold during the week.

== Box office number-one films ==
†	This implies the highest-grossing movie of the year.

Week	End date for the week	Film	Gross (₺)	Tickets sold	Note(s)
1	January 3, 2019	Aquaman	₺6,415,239	391,402	
2	January 10, 2019	Bizim İçin Şampiyon	₺3,647,024	271,782	
3	January 17, 2019	Bizim İçin Şampiyon	₺3,851,771	293,237	
4	January 24, 2019	Can Dostlar	₺5,893,579	468,866	
5	January 31, 2019	Can Dostlar	₺5,762,465	452,399	
6	February 7, 2019	Organize İşler Sazan Sarmalı	₺22,934,134	1,496,857	
7	February 14, 2019	Organize İşler Sazan Sarmalı	₺16,903,994	1,082,373	
8	February 21, 2019	Organize İşler Sazan Sarmalı	₺7,762,438	497,910	
9	February 28, 2019	Organize İşler Sazan Sarmalı	₺3,632,343	229,184	
10	March 7, 2019	Öldür Beni Sevgilim	₺3,179,586	198,775	
11	March 14, 2019	Captain Marvel	₺9,972,484	555,171	
12	March 21, 2019	Captain Marvel	₺4,332,567	242,030	
13	March 28, 2019	Türk İşi Dondurma	₺2,241,215	177,031	
14	April 4, 2019	Türk İşi Dondurma	₺1,372,149	103,751	
15	April 11, 2019	Shazam!	₺2,886,558	157,494	
16	April 18, 2019	Hababam Sınıfı Yeniden	₺1,204,322	80,041	
17	April 25, 2019	Avengers: Endgame	₺6,082,094	352,089	
18	May 2, 2019	Avengers: Endgame	₺26,896,402	1,482,713	
19	May 9, 2019	Avengers: Endgame	₺7,214,443	392,122	
20	May 16, 2019	Avengers: Endgame	₺2,805,942	149,380	
21	May 23, 2019	John Wick: Chapter 3 – Parabellum	₺6,034,680	333,915	
22	May 30, 2019	John Wick: Chapter 3 – Parabellum	₺3,290,695	188,525	
23	June 6, 2019	Enes Batur Gerçek Kahraman	₺2,909,547	190,233	
24	June 13, 2019	Dark Phoenix	₺2,536,409	142,148	
25	June 20, 2019	Enes Batur Gerçek Kahraman	₺1,568,796	110,480	
26	June 27, 2019	Toy Story 4	₺3,036,257	194,355	
27	July 4, 2019	Toy Story 4	₺2,283,168	138,056	
28	July 11, 2019	Spider-Man: Far From Home	₺8,120,072	432,506	
29	July 18, 2019	Spider-Man: Far From Home	₺4,244,583	226,976	
30	July 25, 2019	The Lion King	₺5,195,673	267,265	
31	August 1, 2019	The Lion King	₺3,566,647	187,139	
32	August 8, 2019	Hobbs & Shaw	₺9,054,444	492,517	
33	August 15, 2019	Hobbs & Shaw	₺6,592,656	353,905	
34	August 22, 2019	Hobbs & Shaw	₺4,144,415	228,883	
35	August 29, 2019	Once Upon a Time in Hollywood	₺3,589,005	173,381	
36	September 5, 2019	Masal Şatosu: Sihirli Davet	₺1,814,715	109,484	
37	September 12, 2019	It Chapter Two	₺3,499,549	185,123	
38	September 19, 2019	It Chapter Two	₺1,866,708	103,269	
39	September 26, 2019	Ad Astra	₺2,070,389	106,020	
40	October 3, 2019	Fırıncının Karısı	₺1,424,962	86,156	
41	October 10, 2019	Joker	₺14,027,760	731,034	
42	October 17, 2019	Miracle in Cell No. 7 †	₺20,495,773	1,206,402	
43	October 24, 2019	Miracle in Cell No. 7 †	₺18,923,946	1,096,602	
44	October 31, 2019	Miracle in Cell No. 7 †	₺17,988,611	1,023,850	
45	November 7, 2019	Miracle in Cell No. 7 †	₺9,276,229	532,020	
46	November 14, 2019	Recep İvedik 6	₺26,451,250	1,500,584	
47	November 21, 2019	Recep İvedik 6	₺22,037,049	1,324,097	
48	November 28, 2019	Recep İvedik 6	₺8,907,867	516,384	
49	December 5, 2019	Cep Herkülü: Naim Süleymanoğlu	₺7,490,669	429,363	
50	December 12, 2019	Mucize 2 Aşk	₺12,682,808	716,752	
51	December 19, 2019	Mucize 2 Aşk	₺8,279,637	473,506	
52	December 26, 2019	Mucize 2 Aşk	₺4,768,418	276,273	

== Highest-grossing films ==
=== In-Year Release ===
Highest-grossing films of 2019 by In-year release
Rank	Title	Distributor	Domestic gross
1	Miracle in Cell No. 7	CJ ENM	₺89.557.347
2.	Recep İvedik 6	CJ ENM	₺67.575.527
3.	Money Trap	CJ ENM	₺54.842.530
4.	Avengers: Endgame	UIP	₺44.824.606
5.	Joker	Warner Bros.	₺36.802.462
6.	Kral Şakir: Korsanlar Diyarı	CJ ENM	₺34.299.286
7.	Cep Herkülü: Naim Süleymanoğlu	CGV Mars	₺29.946.788
8.	Mucize 2: Aşk	CGV Mars	₺29.259.678
9.	Hobbs & Shaw	UIP	₺26.353.284
10.	Frozen 2	UIP	₺22.710.793
