= List of 2018 box office number-one films in Argentina =

This is a list of films which placed number-one at the weekend box office in Argentina during 2018. Amounts are in American dollars.

#	Weekend end date	Film	Box office
1	January 7, 2018	Jumanji: Welcome to the Jungle	$1,830,827
2	January 14, 2018	Coco	$2,662,645
3	January 21, 2018	Coco	$1,572,750
4	January 28, 2018	Coco	$1,534,535
5	February 4, 2018	Coco	$1,168,280
6	February 11, 2018	Fifty Shades Freed	$1,823,443
7	February 18, 2018	Black Panther	$1,600,889
8	February 25, 2018	Black Panther	$951,996
9	March 4, 2018	Black Panther	$569,038
10	March 11, 2018	Coco	$468,513
11	March 18, 2018	Tomb Raider	$465,927
12	March 25, 2018	Pacific Rim: Uprising	$656,891
13	April 1, 2018	Ready Player One	$883,223
14	April 8, 2018	A Quiet Place	$559,555
15	April 15, 2018	Rampage	$896,655
16	April 22, 2018	Rampage	$662,877
17	April 29, 2018	Avengers: Infinity War	$5,437,240
18	May 6, 2018	Avengers: Infinity War	$3,066,014
19	May 13, 2018	Avengers: Infinity War	$1,651,334
20	May 20, 2018	Deadpool 2	$1,874,015
21	May 27, 2018	Deadpool 2	$1,083,309
22	June 3, 2018	Deadpool 2	$650,788
24	June 17, 2018	Incredibles 2	$2,935,280
25	June 24, 2018	Jurassic World: Fallen Kingdom	$2,514,280
26	July 1, 2018	Jurassic World: Fallen Kingdom	$1,621,605
27	July 8, 2018	Jurassic World: Fallen Kingdom	$1,180,627
28	July 15, 2018	Hotel Transylvania 3: Summer Vacation	$2,119,626
29	July 22, 2018	Hotel Transylvania 3: Summer Vacation	$2,642,566
30	July 29, 2018	Hotel Transylvania 3: Summer Vacation	$1,758,652
31	August 5, 2018	An Unexpected Love	$995,199
32	August 12, 2018	El Angel	$1,515,339
33	August 19, 2018	El Angel	$976,574
34	August 26, 2018	El Angel	$660,177
35	September 2, 2018	El Angel	$427,303
36	September 9, 2018	The Nun	$1,531,268
37	September 16, 2018	The Nun	$782,834
38	September 23, 2018	The Nun	$346,544
39	September 30, 2018	Smallfoot	$374,542
40	October 7, 2018	Venom	$785,982
41	October 14, 2018	Venom	$595,296
42	October 21, 2018	Venom	$320,330
43	October 28, 2018	Halloween	$318,661
44	November 4, 2018	Bohemian Rhapsody	$791,703
45	November 11, 2018	Bohemian Rhapsody	$755,004
46	November 18, 2018	Fantastic Beasts: The Crimes of Grindelwald	$882,556
47	November 25, 2018	Bohemian Rhapsody	$423,311
48	December 2, 2018	Bohemian Rhapsody	$394,804
49	December 9, 2018	Bohemian Rhapsody	$241,466
50	December 16, 2018	Aquaman	$893,666
51	December 23, 2018	Aquaman	$515,924
52	December 30, 2018	Bumblebee	$614,262

== Highest-grossing films ==
Highest-grossing films of 2018
Rank	Title	Distributor	Domestic gross
1	Avengers: Infinity War	Disney	$16,477,070
2	Incredibles 2	Disney	$15,712,921
3	Coco	Disney	$9,461,456
4	Hotel Transylvania 3: Summer Vacation	UIP	$8,876,058
5	Jurassic World: Fallen Kingdom	UIP	$8,488,337
6	Bohemian Rhapsody	Fox	$5,607,757
7	Jumanji: Welcome to the Jungle	UIP	$5,157,994
8	El Angel	Fox	$4,966,891
9	Fifty Shades Freed	UIP	$4,323,479
10	The Nun	Warner Bros.	$3,978,849
