= List of 2019 box office number-one films in Belgium =

This is a list of films which placed number-one at the weekend box office in Belgium during 2019. Amounts are in American dollars.

== Number-one films ==
†	This implies the highest-grossing movie of the year.

#	Weekend end date	Film	Box office
1	January 6, 2019	Mary Poppins Returns	$568,777
2	January 13, 2019	Mary Poppins Returns	$184,202
3	January 20, 2019	Glass	$332,716
4	January 27, 2019	Glass	$247,316
5	February 3, 2019	How to Train Your Dragon: The Hidden World	$650,013
6	February 10, 2019	How to Train Your Dragon: The Hidden World	$556,974
7	February 17, 2019	Alita: Battle Angel	$750,831
8	February 24, 2019	How to Train Your Dragon: The Hidden World	$178,658
9	March 3, 2019	How to Train Your Dragon: The Hidden World	$233,342
10	March 10, 2019	Captain Marvel	$1,404,316
11	March 17, 2019	Captain Marvel	$566,851
12	March 24, 2019	Captain Marvel	$354,214
13	March 31, 2019	Dumbo	$598,694
14	April 7, 2019	Dumbo	$450,449
15	April 14, 2019	Dumbo	$652,550
16	April 21, 2019	Dumbo	$381,137
17	April 28, 2019	Avengers: Endgame †	$3,141,578
18	May 5, 2019	Avengers: Endgame †	$1,995,049
19	May 12, 2019	Avengers: Endgame †	$737,354
20	May 19, 2019	Avengers: Endgame †	—
21	May 26, 2019	Aladdin	$712,360
22	June 2, 2019	Aladdin	$802,710
23	June 9, 2019	Aladdin	$557,365
25	June 23, 2019	Aladdin	—
26	June 30, 2019	Toy Story 4	$473,884
27	July 7, 2019	Spider-Man: Far From Home	$940,237
28	July 14, 2019	Spider-Man: Far From Home	$676,982
31	August 4, 2019	The Lion King	—
32	August 11, 2019	The Lion King	$1,305,096
33	August 18, 2019	The Lion King	$1,378,305
34	August 25, 2019	The Lion King	—
35	September 1, 2019	The Lion King	$479,952
36	September 8, 2019	The Lion King	$366,237
42	October 20, 2019	Maleficent: Mistress of Evil	$540,472
43	October 27, 2019	Maleficent: Mistress of Evil	$406,659
44	November 3, 2019	Maleficent: Mistress of Evil	$761,545
45	November 10, 2019	Maleficent: Mistress of Evil	$244,582
46	November 17, 2019	Ford v Ferrari	$297,950
47	November 24, 2019	Frozen 2	$2,158,075
48	December 1, 2019	Frozen 2	$1,568,362
49	December 8, 2019	Frozen 2	$899,467
50	December 15, 2019	Jumanji: The Next Level	$732,116
51	December 22, 2019	Star Wars: The Rise of Skywalker	$2,379,822
52	December 29, 2019	Star Wars: The Rise of Skywalker	$1,729,597
