= List of 2020 box office number-one films in Belgium =

This is a list of films which placed number-one at the weekend box office in Belgium during 2020. Amounts are in American dollars.

== Number-one films ==
†	This implies the highest-grossing movie of the year.

#	Weekend end date	Film	Box office
1	January 5, 2020	Star Wars: The Rise of Skywalker	$1,070,983
2	January 12, 2020	1917 †	$705,250
3	January 19, 2020	1917 †	$641,208
4	January 26, 2020	Bad Boys for Life	$1,114,284
5	February 2, 2020	Bad Boys for Life	$913,359
6	February 9, 2020	Bad Boys for Life	$548,187
7	February 16, 2020	Bad Boys for Life	$508,712
8	February 23, 2020	Bad Boys for Life	$353,285
9	March 1, 2020	Bad Boys for Life	$418,743
10	March 8, 2020	Onward	$352,477
11	March 15, 2020	Onward	$40,749
There is no box office data between March and June due to the COVID-19 pandemic.
26	June 28, 2020	The Invisible Man	$2,936
27	July 5, 2020	The Invisible Man	$55,726
28	July 12, 2020	The Invisible Man	$31,160
29	July 19, 2020	The Invisible Man	$17,739
30	July 26, 2020	The Invisible Man	$14,581
31	August 2, 2020	Greenland	$73,112
32	August 9, 2020	Greenland	$58,998
33	August 16, 2020	Greenland	$84,309
34	August 23, 2020	Greenland	$71,920
35	August 30, 2020	The New Mutants	$101,989
36	September 6, 2020	The New Mutants	$61,993
37	September 13, 2020	The New Mutants	$41,952
38	September 20, 2020	Greenland	$33,033
39	September 27, 2020	Trolls World Tour	$89,658
40	October 4, 2020	Trolls World Tour	$122,754
41	October 11, 2020	Greenland	$42,498
42	October 18, 2020	Greenland	$35,602
43	October 25, 2020	Onward	$6,177
44	November 1, 2020	Antebellum	$2,983
There is no box office data for the remaining weekends of the year due to the COVID-19 pandemic.
