= List of 2018 box office number-one films in Turkey =

This is a list of films which placed number one at the weekly box office in Turkey during 2018. The weeks start on Fridays, and finish on Thursdays. The box-office number one is established in terms of tickets sold during the week.

== Box office number-one films ==
†	This implies the highest-grossing movie of the year.

Week	End date for the week	Film	Gross (₺)	Tickets sold	Note(s)
1	January 4, 2018	Aile Arasında	₺6,112,211	475,980	
2	January 11, 2018	Arif v 216	₺27,298,750	2,092,000	
3	January 18, 2018	Arif v 216	₺15,631,798	1,230,282	
4	January 25, 2018	Enes Batur Hayal mi Gerçek mi?	₺9,561,016	798,373	
5	February 1, 2018	Maze Runner: The Death Cure	₺6,208,862	454,013	
6	February 8, 2018	Cebimdeki Yabancı	₺4,130,771	311,319	
7	February 15, 2018	Kayhan	₺4,431,236	361,453	
8	February 22, 2018	Hadi Be Oğlum	₺4,779,217	395,753	
9	March 1, 2018	Hadi Be Oğlum	₺3,312,005	275,250	
10	March 8, 2018	Ailecek Şaşkınız	₺13,735,451	1,134,537	
11	March 15, 2018	Ailecek Şaşkınız	₺10,921,915	905,299	
12	March 22, 2018	Ailecek Şaşkınız	₺6,077,868	503,498	
13	March 29, 2018	Ailecek Şaşkınız	₺5,050,937	411,359	
14	April 5, 2018	Ailecek Şaşkınız	₺2,791,911	232,971	
15	April 12, 2018	Ailecek Şaşkınız	₺1,871,321	226,107	
16	April 19, 2018	Rampage	₺2,106,563	148,805	
17	April 26, 2018	Masha and the Bear	₺2,518,227	206,543	
18	May 3, 2018	Avengers: Infinity War	₺16,553,189	1,124,642	
19	May 10, 2018	Avengers: Infinity War	₺5,896,982	406,119	
20	May 17, 2018	Avengers: Infinity War	₺2,811,773	194,816	
21	May 24, 2018	Deadpool 2	₺8,277,445	614,370	
22	May 31, 2018	Deadpool 2	₺3,891,663	297,631	
23	June 7, 2018	Deadpool 2	₺2,126,905	161,042	
24	June 14, 2018	Jurassic World: Fallen Kingdom	₺4,877,223	334,156	
25	June 21, 2018	Jurassic World: Fallen Kingdom	₺3,264,397	240,808	
26	June 28, 2018	Jurassic World: Fallen Kingdom	₺1,794,731	129,986	
27	July 5, 2018	Jurassic World: Fallen Kingdom	₺1,281,714	93,264	
28	July 12, 2018	Ant-Man and the Wasp	₺3,491,446	250,173	
29	July 19, 2018	Hotel Transylvania 3: Summer Vacation	₺2,510,836	202,755	
30	July 26, 2018	Hotel Transylvania 3: Summer Vacation	₺1,654,696	134,575	
31	August 2, 2018	Mission: Impossible – Fallout	₺3,708,616	247,950	
32	August 9, 2018	Mission: Impossible – Fallout	₺2,194,629	146,270	
33	August 16, 2018	The Meg	₺2,586,412	182,448	
34	August 23, 2018	SİCCÎN 5	₺2,766,285	220,257	
35	August 30, 2018	Incredibles 2	₺5,454,000	436,112	
36	September 6, 2018	Incredibles 2	₺3,168,319	248,374	
37	September 13, 2018	Incredibles 2	₺2,400,034	189,190	
38	September 20, 2018	Incredibles 2	₺1,341,338	100,486	
39	September 27, 2018	The Nun	₺1,591,539	112,779	
40	October 4, 2018	Göktaşı	₺1,878,209	149,749	
41	October 11, 2018	Venom	₺6,577,821	431,971	
42	October 18, 2018	Yol Arkadaşım 2	₺10,081,638	794,430	
43	October 25, 2018	Yol Arkadaşım 2	₺7,296,600	571,552	
44	November 1, 2018	Müslüm †	₺18,484,943	1,377,061	
45	November 8, 2018	Müslüm †	₺18,536,363	1,401,380	
46	November 15, 2018	Müslüm †	₺14,195,624	1,062,906	
47	November 22, 2018	Müslüm †	₺11,180,433	847,245	
48	November 29, 2018	Müslüm †	₺7,810,754	598,884	
49	December 6, 2018	Hedefim Sensin	₺8,102,405	610,127	
50	December 13, 2018	Hedefim Sensin	₺5,260,893	401,074	
51	December 20, 2018	Bizim İçin Şampiyon	₺5,564,348	422,284	
52	December 27, 2018	Bizim İçin Şampiyon	₺4,642,525	354,752	

== Highest-grossing films ==
=== In-Year Release ===
Highest-grossing films of 2018 by In-year release
Rank	Title	Distributor	Domestic gross
1	Müslüm	CGV Mars	₺82.943.121
2.	Arif V 216	CGV Mars	₺62.986.200
3.	Ailecek Şaşkınız	CGV Mars	₺44.688.478
4.	Yol Arkadaşım 2	CJ ENM	₺29.777.664
5.	Avengers: Infinity War	UIP	₺27.311.663
6.	Deliha 2	CGV Mars	₺24.589.811
7.	Hedefim Sensin	CJ ENM	₺21.746.838
8.	Rafadan Tayfa: Dehliz Macerası	CGV Mars	₺19.277.215
9.	Bizim İçin Şampiyon	CJ ENM	₺19.238.832
10.	Çakallarla Dans 5	CJ ENM	₺18.020.616
