= List of 2011 box office number-one films in Poland =

This is a list of films which have placed number one at the weekend box office in Poland during 2011.

== Number-one films ==
†	This implies the highest-grossing movie of the year.

#	Date	Film	Gross	Notes
2	January 9, 2011	Weekend	$1,268,509	Polish film Weekend reached No. 1 in first weekend of release.
3	January 16, 2011	Weekend	$860,113	
4	January 23, 2011	Och, Karol 2	$1,715,538	Och, Karol 2 reached No. 1 in first weekend of release.
5	January 30, 2011	Och, Karol 2	$1,760,950	
6	February 6, 2011	Och, Karol 2	$1,165,370	
7	February 13, 2011	Och, Karol 2	$1,065,293	
8	February 20, 2011	Yogi Bear	$728,059	
9	February 27, 2011	Wojna żeńsko-męska	$620,611	
10	March 6, 2011	Sala samobójców	$457,893	Sala samobójców reached No. 1 in first weekend of release.
11	March 13, 2011	Sala samobójców	$623,257	
12	March 20, 2011	Sala samobójców	$509,843	
13	March 27, 2011	Los numeros	$354,343	Los numeros reached No. 1 in first weekend of release.
14	April 3, 2011	Limitless	$396,875	Limitless reached No. 1 in first weekend of release.
15	April 10, 2011	Rio	$643,876	Rio reached No. 1 in first weekend of release.
16	April 17, 2011	Rio	$353,039	
17	April 24, 2011	Rio	$67,004	
18	May 1, 2011	Thor	$476,913	
19	May 8, 2011	Gnomeo & Juliet	$879,127	
20	May 15, 2011	Gnomeo & Juliet	$905,271	
21	May 22, 2011	Pirates of the Caribbean: On Stranger Tides	$2,487,034	
22	May 29, 2011	Pirates of the Caribbean: On Stranger Tides	$1,466,494	
23	June 5, 2011	The Hangover Part II	$1,090,214	
24	June 12, 2011	The Hangover Part II	$915,399	
25	June 19, 2011	The Hangover Part II	$607,950	
26	June 26, 2011	The Hangover Part II	$386,982	
27	July 3, 2011	Cars 2	$1,852,914	
28	July 10, 2011	Cars 2	TBD	
29	July 17, 2011	Harry Potter and the Deathly Hallows – Part 2	$2,843,321	Deathly Hallows - Part 2 currently has the highest weekend debut of 2011.
30	July 24, 2011	Harry Potter and the Deathly Hallows – Part 2	$1,141,589	
31	July 31, 2011	Harry Potter and the Deathly Hallows – Part 2	$619,846	
32	August 7, 2011	Harry Potter and the Deathly Hallows – Part 2	$267,971	
33	August 14, 2011	Final Destination 5	$849,606	Final Destination 5 reached No. 1 in first weekend of release.
34	August 21, 2011	The Smurfs	$1,356,134	
35	August 28, 2011	The Smurfs	$819,797	
36	September 4, 2011	Midnight in Paris	$522,715	Midnight in Paris reached No. 1 in its second weekend of release.
37	September 11, 2011	Midnight in Paris	$444,850	
38	September 18, 2011	Midnight in Paris	$336,331	
39	September 25, 2011	Midnight in Paris	$242,716	
40	October 2, 2011	Battle of Warsaw 1920	$1,427,318	Battle of Warsaw 1920 reached No. 1 in first weekend of release.
41	October 9, 2011	Battle of Warsaw 1920	$1,215,410	
42	October 16, 2011	Baby są jakieś inne	$1,572,768	Baby są jakieś inne reached No. 1 in first weekend of release.
43	October 23, 2011	Baby są jakieś inne	$914,724	
44	October 30, 2011	Baby są jakieś inne	$487,031	
45	November 6, 2011	Wyjazd integracyjny	$1,884,399	Wyjazd integracyjny reached No. 1 in first weekend of release.
46	November 13, 2011	Listy do M. †	$1,643,091	Listy do M. reached No. 1 in first weekend of release.
47	November 20, 2011	The Twilight Saga: Breaking Dawn – Part 1	$1,980,215	
48	November 27, 2011	Listy do M. †	$1,300,242	
49	December 4, 2011	Listy do M. †	$1,277,952	
50	December 11, 2011	Listy do M. †	$1,073,043	
51	December 18, 2011	Listy do M. †	$662,490	
52	December 25, 2011	Listy do M. †	$93,943	

== See also ==
- List of Polish films — Polish films by year
