= List of 2017 box office number-one films in Belgium =

This is a list of films which placed number-one at the weekend box office in Belgium during 2017. Amounts are in American dollars.

#	Weekend end date	Film	Box office
9	March 5, 2017	Fifty Shades Darker	—
10	March 12, 2017	Fifty Shades Darker	$160,597
11	March 19, 2017	Logan	$270,966
12	March 26, 2017	Beauty and the Beast	$1,218,336
13	April 2, 2017	Beauty and the Beast	$894,970
14	April 9, 2017	Beauty and the Beast	$755,399
15	April 16, 2017	The Fate of the Furious	$2,339,476
16	April 23, 2017	The Fate of the Furious	$829,218
17	April 30, 2017	Guardians of the Galaxy Vol. 2	$695,950
18	May 7, 2017	Guardians of the Galaxy Vol. 2	$438,594
19	May 14, 2017	Guardians of the Galaxy Vol. 2	$250,434
20	May 21, 2017	Alien: Covenant	$485,211
21	May 28, 2017	Pirates of the Caribbean: Dead Men Tell No Tales	$1,099,321
22	June 4, 2017	Pirates of the Caribbean: Dead Men Tell No Tales	$652,759
23	June 11, 2017	Pirates of the Caribbean: Dead Men Tell No Tales	$377,959
24	June 18, 2017	Pirates of the Caribbean: Dead Men Tell No Tales	$257,444
25	June 25, 2017	Wonder Woman	$713,000
26	July 2, 2017	Transformers: The Last Knight	$761,165
27	July 9, 2017	Despicable Me 3	$1,388,691
28	July 16, 2017	Despicable Me 3	$1,001,456
29	July 23, 2017	Spider-Man: Homecoming	$876,116
30	July 30, 2017	Valerian and the City of a Thousand Planets	$520,916
31	August 6, 2017	Baby Driver	$428,426
32	August 13, 2017	The Emoji Movie	$414,373
33	August 20, 2017	The Emoji Movie	$303,771
34	August 27, 2017	The Emoji Movie	$128,757
35	September 3, 2017	The Emoji Movie	$243,040
36	September 10, 2017	The Emoji Movie	$136,780
37	September 17, 2017	American Made	$215,667
38	September 24, 2017	American Made	$115,851
39	October 1, 2017	The Emoji Movie	$130,042
40	October 8, 2017	Blade Runner 2049	$488,187
41	October 15, 2017	Blade Runner 2049	$274,774
42	October 22, 2017	Blade Runner 2049	$221,775
43	October 29, 2017	Thor: Ragnarok	$705,034
44	November 5, 2017	Thor: Ragnarok	$679,820
45	November 12, 2017	Thor: Ragnarok	$293,751
46	November 19, 2017	Thor: Ragnarok	$160,268
47	November 26, 2017	Thor: Ragnarok	$105,633
48	December 3, 2017	Coco	$672,694
49	December 10, 2017	Murder on the Orient Express	$528,690
50	December 17, 2017	Star Wars: The Last Jedi	$2,579,569
51	December 24, 2017	Star Wars: The Last Jedi	$1,112,533
52	December 31, 2017	Star Wars: The Last Jedi	$1,495,006

== Highest-grossing films ==
Highest-grossing films of 2017
Rank	Title	Distributor	Domestic gross
1	Star Wars: The Last Jedi	Disney	$9,053,013
2	Despicable Me 3	Universal	$6,658,997
3	Beauty and the Beast	Disney	$6,626,948
4	The Fate of the Furious	Universal	$5,364,190
5	Coco	Disney	$5,325,021
6	Pirates of the Caribbean: Dead Men Tell No Tales	Disney	$5,287,437
7	Fifty Shades Darker	Universal	$4,628,670
8	The Boss Baby	Fox	$4,290,409
9	Paddington 2	Belga	$3,896,707
10	La La Land	Belga	$3,389,982
