= List of 2016 box office number-one films in Turkey =

This is a list of films which have placed number one at the weekly box office in Turkey during 2016. The weeks start on Fridays, and finish on Thursdays. The box-office number one is established in terms of tickets sold during the week.

== Box office number-one films ==
The Mountain II became the highest grossing movie of the year, despite not reaching #1.

#	Date	Film	Gross (₺)	Tickets sold
1	January 7, 2016	Kocan Kadar Konuş: Diriliş	₺ 6,185,566	511,919
2	January 14, 2016	Kocan Kadar Konuş: Diriliş	₺ 4,085,663	347,656
3	January 21, 2016	Kardeşim Benim	₺ 7,846,994	702,023
4	January 28, 2016	Dedemin Fişi	₺ 7,008,850	616,853
5	February 4, 2016	Dedemin Fişi	₺ 6,817,538	601,447
6	February 11, 2016	Dedemin Fişi	₺ 4,248,881	368,436
7	February 18, 2016	Deadpool	₺ 7,030,061	547,575
8	February 25, 2016	Osman Pazarlama	₺ 11,736,564	1,012,109
9	March 3, 2016	Osman Pazarlama	₺ 5,770,643	506,271
10	March 10, 2016	Osman Pazarlama	₺ 2,608,419	231,176
11	March 17, 2016	Kolpaçino 3. Devre	₺ 8,445,582	716,542
12	March 24, 2016	Kolpaçino 3. Devre	₺ 2,724,514	239,479
13	March 31, 2016	Batman v Superman: Dawn of Justice	₺ 10,022,507	752,726
14	April 7, 2016	Batman v Superman: Dawn of Justice	₺ 4,595,328	340,524
15	April 14, 2016	Küçük Esnaf	₺ 2,497,657	229,635
16	April 21, 2016	Küçük Esnaf	₺ 1,785,251	165,708
17	April 28, 2016	Küçük Esnaf	₺ 1,602,676	148,851
18	May 5, 2016	Küçük Esnaf	₺ 1,095,767	101,345
19	May 12, 2016	Captain America: Civil War	₺ 8,722,891	677,101
20	May 19, 2016	Captain America: Civil War	₺ 3,611,141	281,627
21	May 26, 2016	X-Men: Apocalypse	₺ 3,066,465	230,776
22	June 2, 2016	X-Men: Apocalypse	₺ 1,722,104	130,426
23	June 9, 2016	Warcraft	₺ 4,063,955	309,930
24	June 16, 2016	Now You See Me 2	₺ 2,020,913	176,429
25	June 23, 2016	Now You See Me 2	₺ 1,747,338	150,736
26	June 30, 2016	Teenage Mutant Ninja Turtles: Out of the Shadows	₺ 1,112,836	94,551
27	July 7, 2016	Üç Harfliler 3: Karabüyü	₺ 811,449	75,610
28	July 14, 2016	The Legend of Tarzan	₺ 2,032,065	158,486
29	July 21, 2016	Ice Age: Collision Course	₺ 3,169,706	280,923
30	July 28, 2016	Ice Age: Collision Course	₺ 3,084,768	270,541
31	August 4, 2016	Ice Age: Collision Course	₺ 2,495,022	220,108
32	August 11, 2016	Ice Age: Collision Course	₺ 1,708,261	155,677
33	August 18, 2016	Suicide Squad	₺ 5,748,127	452,051
34	August 25, 2016	Suicide Squad	₺ 2,831,538	226,689
35	September 1, 2016	Mechanic: Resurrection	₺ 3,296,713	300,117
36	September 8, 2016	Finding Dory	₺ 2,310,070	194,910
37	September 15, 2016	Mechanic: Resurrection	₺ 2,350,955	203,222
38	September 22, 2016	Mechanic: Resurrection	₺ 1,501,379	134,465
39	September 29, 2016	Mechanic: Resurrection	₺ 1,164,211	103,684
40	October 6, 2016	Bir Baba Hindu	₺ 3,128,928	289,535
41	October 13, 2016	Bir Baba Hindu	₺ 2,173,018	199,662
42	October 20, 2016	Inferno	₺ 3,198,368	254,658
43	October 27, 2016	İkimizin Yerine	₺ 6,405,883	569,013
44	November 3, 2016	İkimizin Yerine	₺ 4,544,315	400,676
45	November 10, 2016	Dağ 2	₺ 4,959,201	449,568
46	November 17, 2016	Dağ 2	₺ 6,123,073	560,250
47	November 24, 2016	Dağ 2	₺ 5,354,987	495,419
48	December 1, 2016	Çakallarla Dans 4	₺ 6,790,582	619,979
49	December 8, 2016	Görümce	₺ 6,870,066	607,238
50	December 15, 2016	Görümce	₺ 5,460,869	462,495
51	December 22, 2016	Görümce	₺ 3,787,437	322,748
52	December 29, 2016	Assassin's Creed	₺ 3,964,366	299,920

== Highest-grossing films ==
=== In-Year Release ===
Highest-grossing films of 2016 by In-year release
Rank	Title	Distributor	Domestic gross
1	The Mountain II	CGV Mars	₺31.817.375
2.	Kardeşim Benim	CGV Mars	₺23.132.614
3.	Dedemin Fişi	UIP	₺22.912.770
4.	Osman Pazarlama	Warner Bros.	₺22.736.060
5.	Batman v Superman: Dawn of Justice	Warner Bros.	₺19.429.872
6.	Görümce	CGV Mars	₺18.888.006
7.	Kolpaçino 3. Devre	UIP	₺16.490.847
8.	Kocan Kadar Konuş: Diriliş	UIP	₺15.901.106
9.	İkimizin Yerine	UIP	₺15.539.899
10.	Captain America: Civil War	UIP	₺14.760.714
