= List of 2020 box office number-one films in Italy =

The following is a list of 2020 box office number-one films in Italy.

== Number-one films ==
†	This implies the highest-grossing movie of the year.

#	Date	Film	Gross	Notes
1	January 5, 2020	Tolo Tolo †	US$23,551,220	
2	January 12, 2020	Tolo Tolo †	US$5,840,027	
3	January 19, 2020	Hammamet	US$1,790,520	
4	January 26, 2020	1917	US$2,375,913	
5	February 2, 2020	Dolittle	US$2,258,691	
6	February 9, 2020	Birds of Prey	US$1,300,000	
7	February 16, 2020	Birds of Prey	US$659,000	
8	February 23, 2020	Gli anni più belli	US$1,298,141	
9	March 1, 2020	Gli anni più belli	US$414,435	
10	March 8, 2020	Hidden Away	US$102,158	
11	March 15, 2020	Italian cinemas closed and box office reporting suspended due to the COVID-19 pandemic		
12	March 22, 2020	Italian cinemas closed and box office reporting suspended due to the COVID-19 pandemic		
13	March 29, 2020	Italian cinemas closed and box office reporting suspended due to the COVID-19 pandemic		
14	April 5, 2020	Italian cinemas closed and box office reporting suspended due to the COVID-19 pandemic		
15	April 12, 2020	Italian cinemas closed and box office reporting suspended due to the COVID-19 pandemic		
16	April 19, 2020	Italian cinemas closed and box office reporting suspended due to the COVID-19 pandemic		
17	April 26, 2020	Italian cinemas closed and box office reporting suspended due to the COVID-19 pandemic		
18	May 3, 2020	Italian cinemas closed and box office reporting suspended due to the COVID-19 pandemic		
19	May 10, 2020	Italian cinemas closed and box office reporting suspended due to the COVID-19 pandemic		
20	May 17, 2020	Italian cinemas closed and box office reporting suspended due to the COVID-19 pandemic		
21	May 24, 2020	Italian cinemas closed and box office reporting suspended due to the COVID-19 pandemic		
22	May 31, 2020	Italian cinemas closed and box office reporting suspended due to the COVID-19 pandemic		
23	June 7, 2020	Italian cinemas closed and box office reporting suspended due to the COVID-19 pandemic		
24	June 14, 2020	Les Misérables	US$1,442	
25	June 21, 2020	Les Misérables	US$22,261	
26	June 28, 2020	Les Misérables	US$17,828	
27	July 5, 2020	Les Misérables	US$17,872	
28	July 12, 2020	Jojo Rabbit	US$37,693	
29	July 19, 2020	The Best Years	US$56,933	
30	July 26, 2020	The Best Years	US$15,673	
31	August 2, 2020	The Best Years	US$23,378	
32	August 9, 2020	Jojo Rabbit	US$19,369	
33	August 16, 2020	Hidden Away	US$117,840	
34	August 23, 2020	Onward	US$218,300	
35	August 30, 2020	Tenet	US$1,870,969	
36	September 6, 2020	After We Collided	US$1,808,879	
37	September 13, 2020	Tenet	US$741,803	
38	September 20, 2020	Tenet	US$515,163	
39	September 27, 2020	Unhinged	US$474,013	
40	October 4, 2020	Unhinged	US$403,252	
41	October 11, 2020	Greenland	US$858,334	
42	October 18, 2020	Greenland	US$414,098	
43	October 25, 2020	Sul più bello	US$352,041	
44	November 1, 2020	Italian cinemas closed and box office reporting suspended due to the COVID-19 pandemic		
45	November 8, 2020	Italian cinemas closed and box office reporting suspended due to the COVID-19 pandemic		
46	November 15, 2020	Italian cinemas closed and box office reporting suspended due to the COVID-19 pandemic		
47	November 22, 2020	Italian cinemas closed and box office reporting suspended due to the COVID-19 pandemic		
48	November 29, 2020	Italian cinemas closed and box office reporting suspended due to the COVID-19 pandemic		
49	December 6, 2020	Italian cinemas closed and box office reporting suspended due to the COVID-19 pandemic		
50	December 13, 2020	Italian cinemas closed and box office reporting suspended due to the COVID-19 pandemic		
51	December 20, 2020	Italian cinemas closed and box office reporting suspended due to the COVID-19 pandemic		
52	December 27, 2020	Italian cinemas closed and box office reporting suspended due to the COVID-19 pandemic		
