= List of 2017 box office number-one films in Chile =

This is a list of films which placed number-one at the weekend box office in Chile during 2017. Amounts are in American dollars.

== Films ==
#	Weekend end date	Film	Box office
12	March 26, 2017	The Boss Baby	—
13	April 2, 2017	Beauty and the Beast	$1,487,512
14	April 9, 2017	Beauty and the Beast	$960,208
15	April 16, 2017	The Fate of the Furious	$2,585,082
16	April 23, 2017	The Fate of the Furious	$1,378,279
17	April 30, 2017	Guardians of the Galaxy Vol. 2	$994,851
18	May 7, 2017	Guardians of the Galaxy Vol. 2	$593,690
19	May 14, 2017	Guardians of the Galaxy Vol. 2	$293,078
20	May 21, 2017	Alien: Covenant	$392,722
21	May 28, 2017	Pirates of the Caribbean: Dead Men Tell No Tales	$942,160
22	June 4, 2017	Pirates of the Caribbean: Dead Men Tell No Tales	$718,912
23	June 11, 2017	Pirates of the Caribbean: Dead Men Tell No Tales	$511,297
24	June 18, 2017	Pirates of the Caribbean: Dead Men Tell No Tales	$320,238
25	June 25, 2017	Pirates of the Caribbean: Dead Men Tell No Tales	$276,626
26	July 2, 2017	Despicable Me 3	$914,822
27	July 9, 2017	Spider-Man: Homecoming	$1,365,654
28	July 16, 2017	Despicable Me 3	$1,117,032
29	July 23, 2017	Transformers: The Last Knight	$1,060,631
30	July 30, 2017	Transformers: The Last Knight	$453,977
31	August 6, 2017	The Emoji Movie	$548,035
32	August 13, 2017	The Emoji Movie	$355,945
33	August 20, 2017	The Emoji Movie	$224,723
34	August 27, 2017	The Emoji Movie	$180,223
35	September 3, 2017	The Nut Job 2: Nutty by Nature	$181,530
36	September 10, 2017	The Nut Job 2: Nutty by Nature	$113,278
37	September 17, 2017	The Nut Job 2: Nutty by Nature	$113,278
38	September 24, 2017	Mother!	$102,622
39	October 1, 2017	Amityville: The Awakening	$113,737
40	October 8, 2017	Blade Runner 2049	$318,465
41	October 15, 2017	Condorito: La Película	$560,446
42	October 22, 2017	Condorito: La Película	$409,640
43	October 29, 2017	Thor: Ragnarok	$1,339,568
44	November 5, 2017	Thor: Ragnarok	$674,639
45	November 12, 2017	Thor: Ragnarok	$408,416
46	November 19, 2017	Thor: Ragnarok	$141,911
47	November 26, 2017	Coco	$544,163
48	December 3, 2017	Coco	$591,599
49	December 10, 2017	Coco	$629,011
50	December 17, 2017	Star Wars: The Last Jedi	$1,475,075
51	December 24, 2017	Star Wars: The Last Jedi	$692,417
52	December 31, 2017	Jumanji: Welcome to the Jungle	$652,132

== Highest-grossing films ==
Highest-grossing films of 2017
Rank	Title	Distributor	Domestic gross
1	Coco	Disney	$10,009,654
2	Despicable Me 3	Universal	$7,377,294
3	The Fate of the Furious	Universal	$6,974,391
4	Moana	Disney	$5,357,169
5	Star Wars: The Last Jedi	Disney	$4,981,243
6	Beauty and the Beast	Disney	$4,875,578
7	The Boss Baby	Fox	$4,630,561
8	Jumanji: Welcome to the Jungle	Sony	$4,616,326
9	Spider-Man: Homecoming	Sony	$4,362,392
10	Pirates of the Caribbean: Dead Men Tell No Tales	Disney	$4,113,830
