= List of 2015 box office number-one films in Venezuela =

This is a list of films which placed number one at the weekend box office for the year 2015.

== Number-one films ==
| † | This implies the highest-grossing movie of the year. |

| # | Date | Film | Gross | Notes |
|---|---|---|---|---|
| 1 | January 4, 2015 | Horrible Bosses 2 | $357,469 | |
| 2 | January 11, 2015 | Exodus: Gods and Kings | $459,972 | |
| 3 | January 18, 2015 | Exodus: Gods and Kings | $431,961 | |
| 4 | January 25, 2015 | Night at the Museum: Secret of the Tomb | $590,242 | |
| 5 | February 1, 2015 | Night at the Museum: Secret of the Tomb | $679,552 | |
| 6 | February 8, 2015 | Night at the Museum: Secret of the Tomb | $551,843 | |
| 7 | February 15, 2015 | Fifty Shades of Grey | $1,260,571 | |
| 8 | February 22, 2015 | Fifty Shades of Grey | $1,145,938 | |
| 9 | March 1, 2015 | Fifty Shades of Grey | $831,390 | |
| 10 | March 8, 2015 | Fifty Shades of Grey | $550,448 | |
| 11 | March 15, 2015 | Cinderella | $752,890 | |
| 12 | March 22, 2015 | Cinderella | $811,265 | |
| 13 | March 29, 2015 | Cinderella | $756,941 | |
| 14 | April 5, 2015 | Furious 7 | $2,177,355 | |
| 15 | April 12, 2015 | Furious 7 | $2,096,331 | |
| 16 | April 19, 2015 | Furious 7 | $1,950,306 | |
| 17 | April 26, 2015 | Furious 7 | $1,721,864 | |
| 18 | May 3, 2015 | Avengers: Age of Ultron | $3,675,546 | |
| 19 | May 10, 2015 | Avengers: Age of Ultron | $2,228,445 | |
| 20 | May 17, 2015 | Avengers: Age of Ultron | $1,874,260 | |
| 21 | May 24, 2015 | Avengers: Age of Ultron | $1,367,023 | |
| 22 | May 31, 2015 | Avengers: Age of Ultron | $1,139,839 | |
| 23 | June 7, 2015 | San Andreas | $1,451,337 | |
| 24 | June 14, 2015 | Jurassic World | $2,310,702 | |
| 25 | June 21, 2015 | Inside Out | $2,106,327 | |
| 26 | June 28, 2015 | Inside Out | $2,423,806 | |
| 27 | July 5, 2015 | Inside Out | $2,255,926 | |
| 28 | July 12, 2015 | Minions † | $3,241,195 | |
| 29 | July 19, 2015 | Minions † | $3,195,342 | |
| 30 | July 26, 2015 | Minions † | $2,646,511 | |
| 31 | August 2, 2015 | Minions † | $1,701,701 | |
| 32 | August 9, 2015 | Minions † | $1,300,157 | |
| 33 | August 16, 2015 | Minions † | $1,048,996 | |
| 34 | August 23, 2015 | Fantastic Four | $1,394,276 | |
| 35 | August 30, 2015 | Fantastic Four | $1,197,292 | |
| 36 | September 6, 2015 | Fantastic Four | $865,099 | |
| 37 | September 13, 2015 | Fantastic Four | $616,420 | |
| 38 | September 20, 2015 | Maze Runner: The Scorch Trials | $1,181,924 | |
| 39 | September 27, 2015 | Hotel Transylvania 2 | $2,567,695 | |
| 40 | October 4, 2015 | Hotel Transylvania 2 | $2,543,969 | |
| 41 | October 11, 2015 | Hotel Transylvania 2 | $1,240,156 | |
| 42 | October 18, 2015 | Hotel Transylvania 2 | $1,715,919 | |
| 43 | October 25, 2015 | Hotel Transylvania 2 | $1,241,762 | |
| 44 | November 1, 2015 | Hotel Transylvania 2 | $1,058,695 | |
| 45 | November 8, 2015 | Spectre | $994,915 | |
| 46 | November 15, 2015 | Hotel Transylvania 2 | $860,770 | Hotel Transylvania 2 reclaimed the #1 spot in its eighth weekend of release. |
| 47 | November 22, 2015 | The Hunger Games: Mockingjay – Part 2 | $1,745,927 | |
| 48 | November 29, 2015 | The Hunger Games: Mockingjay – Part 2 | $948,462 | |
| 49 | December 6, 2015 | The Hunger Games: Mockingjay – Part 2 | $578,762 | |
| 50 | December 13, 2015 | The Good Dinosaur | $1,817,691 | |
| 51 | December 20, 2015 | Star Wars: The Force Awakens | $3,925,380 | Star Wars: The Force Awakens had the highest weekend debut of 2015. |
| 52 | December 27, 2015 | Star Wars: The Force Awakens | $2,567,910 | |

== Highest-grossing films ==
Highest-grossing films of 2015 in Venezuela
| Rank | Title | Studio | Domestic Gross |
|---|---|---|---|
| 1. | Minions | Universal Pictures / Illumination Entertainment | $27,015,386 |
| 2. | Inside Out | Walt Disney Pictures / Pixar Animation Studios | $25,432,065 |
| 3. | Hotel Transylvania 2 | Columbia Pictures / Sony Pictures Animation | $24,966,016 |
| 4. | Furious 7 | Universal Pictures | $19,091,734 |
| 5. | Avengers: Age of Ultron | Walt Disney Pictures / Marvel Studios | $18,531,156 |
| 6. | Jurassic World | Universal Pictures / Legendary Pictures | $15,076,582 |
| 7. | The Good Dinosaur | Walt Disney Pictures / Pixar Animation Studios | $10,830,620 |
| 8. | Pixels | Columbia Pictures | $10,106,090 |
| 9. | The Hunger Games: Mockingjay – Part 2 | Lionsgate | $9,477,940 |
| 10. | San Andreas | Warner Bros. / New Line Cinema | $8,451,445 |

== See also ==
- List of American films — American films by year
