= List of 2017 box office number-one films in Venezuela =

This is a list of films which placed number one at the weekend box office for the year 2017.

#	Date	Film	Gross	Notes
1	January 1, 2017	Office Christmas Party	$478,017	
2	January 8, 2017	Moana	$220,726	Moana reached the #1 spot in its seventh weekend of release.
3	January 15, 2017	Moana	$229,518	
4	January 22, 2017	Moana	$115,971	
5	January 29, 2017	La La Land	$124,303	
6	February 5, 2017	La La Land	$124,303	
7	February 12, 2017	Fifty Shades Darker	$233,094	
8	February 19, 2017	Fifty Shades Darker	$155,648	
9	February 26, 2017	Fifty Shades Darker	$174,016	
10	March 5, 2017	The Great Wall	$75,690	The Great Wall reached the #1 spot in its second weekend of release.
11	March 12, 2017	Moana	$47,544	Moana reclaimed the #1 spot in its sixteenth weekend of release.
12	March 19, 2017	A Dog's Purpose	$31,817	
13	March 26, 2017	Beauty and the Beast	$890,000	
14	April 2, 2017	Beauty and the Beast	$742,907	
15	April 9, 2017	Beauty and the Beast	$517,558	
16	April 16, 2017	The Fate of the Furious	$1,037,548	
17	April 23, 2017	The Fate of the Furious	$361,859	
18	April 30, 2017	Guardians of the Galaxy Vol. 2	$962,491	
19	May 7, 2017	Guardians of the Galaxy Vol. 2	$600,000	
20	May 14, 2017	Guardians of the Galaxy Vol. 2	$390,000	
21	May 21, 2017	The Fate of the Furious	$127,079	The Fate of the Furious reclaimed the #1 spot in its sixth weekend of release.
22	May 28, 2017	The Fate of the Furious	$86,751	
23	June 4, 2017	The Fate of the Furious	$80,586	
24	June 11, 2017	The Mummy	$198,516	
25	June 18, 2017	The Mummy	$154,387	
26	June 25, 2017	Baywatch	$175,207	
27	July 2, 2017	Despicable Me 3	$498,286	
28	July 9, 2017	Spider-Man: Homecoming	$451,344	
29	July 16, 2017	Spider-Man: Homecoming	$331,175	
30	July 23, 2017	Spider-Man: Homecoming	$133,654	
31	July 30, 2017	Spider-Man: Homecoming	$79,972	
32	August 2, 2017	Despicable Me 3	$69,852	Despicable Me 3 reclaimed the #1 spot in its sixth weekend of release.
33	August 13, 2017	The Emoji Movie	$100,894	
34	August 20, 2017	The Emoji Movie	$90,686	
35	August 27, 2017	The Emoji Movie	$80,005	
36	September 3, 2017	Amityville: The Awakening	$293,098	
37	September 10, 2017	The Glass Castle	$73,147	The Glass Castle reached the #1 spot in its second weekend of release.
38	September 17, 2017	Amityville: The Awakening	$85,701	Amityville: The Awakening reclaimed the #1 spot in its third weekend of release.
39	September 24, 2017	American Made	$48,515	
40	October 1, 2017	American Made	$53,714	
41	October 8, 2017	Blade Runner 2049	$67,548	
42	October 15, 2017	My Little Pony: The Movie	$344,181	
43	October 22, 2017	My Little Pony: The Movie	$212,195	
44	October 29, 2017	Jigsaw	$833,278	
45	November 5, 2017	The Nut Job 2: Nutty by Nature	$993,171	The Nut Job 2: Nutty by Nature reached the #1 spot in its second weekend of release.
46	November 12, 2017	The Nut Job 2: Nutty by Nature	$1,042,240	
47	November 19, 2017	Jigsaw	$429,668	Jigsaw reclaimed the #1 spot in its fourth weekend of release.
48	November 26, 2017	Thor: Ragnarok	$168,228	Thor: Ragnarok reached the #1 spot in its fourth weekend of release.
49	December 3, 2017	Wonder	$388,689	Wonder reached the #1 spot in its second weekend of release.
50	December 10, 2017	Coco	$770,452	
51	December 17, 2017	Star Wars: The Last Jedi	$855,427	
52	December 24, 2017	Coco	$211,214	Coco reclaimed the #1 spot in its third weekend of release.
53	December 31, 2017	Wonder	$1,950,934	Wonder reclaimed the #1 spot in its sixth weekend of release. It had the highest weekend debut of 2017.

== Highest-grossing films ==
Highest-grossing films of 2017 in Venezuela
Rank	Title	Studio	Domestic Gross
1.	Jumanji: Welcome to the Jungle	Columbia Pictures	$14,353,583
2.	Beauty and the Beast	Walt Disney Pictures	$10,804,965
3.	Coco	Walt Disney Pictures / Pixar Animation Studios	$8,965,760
4.	Wonder	Lionsgate	$6,375,752
5.	Jigsaw	Lionsgate	$5,750,510
6.	The Nut Job 2: Nutty by Nature	Open Road Films	$4,246,796
7.	The Fate of the Furious	Universal Pictures	$3,980,344
8.	Thor: Ragnarok	Walt Disney Pictures / Marvel Studios	$2,985,748
9.	Guardians of the Galaxy Vol. 2	Walt Disney Pictures / Marvel Studios	$2,733,390
10.	Fifty Shades Darker	Universal Pictures	$2,631,202

== See also ==
- List of American films — American films by year
