= List of 2018 box office number-one films in France =

The following is a list of 2018 box office number-one films in France.

== Number-one films ==
†	This implies the highest-grossing movie of the year.

#	Date	Film	Gross	Notes
1	January 7, 2018	Star Wars: The Last Jedi	US$6,557,062	
2	January 14, 2018	Jumanji: Welcome to the Jungle	US$2,127,871	
3	January 21, 2018	Brillantissime	US$2,006,033	
4	January 28, 2018	The Post	US$2,771,269	
5	February 4, 2018	Les Tuche 3	US$16,604,101	
6	February 11, 2018	Les Tuche 3	US$8,753,427	
7	February 18, 2018	Black Panther	US$7,627,163	
8	February 25, 2018	Black Panther	US$5,637,555	
9	March 4, 2018	La ch'tite famille	US$16,739,183	
10	March 11, 2018	La ch'tite famille	US$9,546,133	
11	March 18, 2018	La ch'tite famille	US$5,278,842	
12	March 25, 2018	Rolling to You	US$3,073,866	
13	April 1, 2018	Ready Player One	US$5,484,062	
14	April 8, 2018	Ready Player One	US$3,140,585	
15	April 15, 2018	Taxi 5	US$10,568,544	
16	April 22, 2018	Taxi 5	US$4,109,407	
17	April 29, 2018	Avengers: Infinity War †	US$17,645,304	
18	May 6, 2018	Avengers: Infinity War †	US$6,891,789	
19	May 13, 2018	Avengers: Infinity War †	US$6,273,652	
20	May 20, 2018	Deadpool 2	US$8,836,807	
21	May 27, 2018	Solo: A Star Wars Story	US$4,015,319	
22	June 3, 2018	Solo: A Star Wars Story	US$2,770,078	
23	June 10, 2018	Jurassic World: Fallen Kingdom	US$9,579,503	
24	June 17, 2018	Jurassic World: Fallen Kingdom	US$4,791,805	
25	June 24, 2018	Jurassic World: Fallen Kingdom	US$2,520,159	
26	July 1, 2018	Jurassic World: Fallen Kingdom	US$1,740,016	
27	July 8, 2018	Incredibles 2	US$9,454,086	
28	July 15, 2018	Incredibles 2	US$5,152,960	
29	July 22, 2018	Incredibles 2	US$4,859,634	
30	July 29, 2018	Hotel Transylvania 3: Summer Vacation	US$3,929,857	
31	August 5, 2018	Mission: Impossible – Fallout	US$8,193,447	
32	August 12, 2018	Mission: Impossible – Fallout	US$4,350,586	
33	August 19, 2018	Mission: Impossible – Fallout	US$2,873,390	
34	August 26, 2018	The Meg	US$4,513,632	
35	September 2, 2018	The Meg	US$2,513,203	
36	September 9, 2018	Photo de Famille	US$1,414,632	
37	September 16, 2018	Première année	US$2,222,791	
38	September 23, 2018	The Nun	US$4,425,722	
39	September 30, 2018	The Nun	US$2,254,244	
40	October 7, 2018	Alad'2	US$6,228,621	
41	October 14, 2018	Venom	US$6,646,527	
42	October 21, 2018	Venom	US$3,019,547	
43	October 28, 2018	Sink or Swim	US$9,051,705	
44	November 4, 2018	Sink or Swim	US$9,676,385	
45	November 11, 2018	Bohemian Rhapsody	US$5,154,997	
46	November 18, 2018	Fantastic Beasts: The Crimes of Grindelwald	US$11,438,486	
47	November 25, 2018	Fantastic Beasts: The Crimes of Grindelwald	US$6,378,619	
48	December 2, 2018	Fantastic Beasts: The Crimes of Grindelwald	US$3,656,409	
49	December 9, 2018	Asterix: The Secret of the Magic Potion	US$6,863,693	
50	December 16, 2018	Asterix: The Secret of the Magic Potion	US$4,187,527	
