= List of 2007 box office number-one films in Turkey =

This is a list of films which have placed number one at the weekly box office in Turkey during 2007. The weeks start on Fridays, and finish on Thursdays. The box-office number one is established in terms of tickets sold during the week.

== Highest-grossing films ==
=== In-Year Release ===
Highest-grossing films of 2007 by In-year release
Rank	Title	Distributor	Domestic gross
1.	The White Angel	MVZ	₺12.736.196
2.	For Love and Honor	UIP	₺11.636.411
3.	The Masked Gang: Iraq	Özen	₺8.593.596
4.	The Last Ottoman	Özen	₺7.592.806
5.	Pirates of the Caribbean: At Worlds End	UIP	₺7.400.884
6.	300	Warner Bros.	₺6.384.398
7.	Spider-Man 3	Warner Bros.	₺5.671.787
8.	Cool School	Warner Bros.	₺5.460.861
9.	Harry Potter and the Order of the Phoenix	Warner Bros.	₺5.148.846
10.	Shrek the Third	UIP	₺4.879.502
