= List of 2020 box office number-one films in Argentina =

This is a list of films which placed number-one at the weekend box office in Argentina during 2020. Amounts are in American dollars.

== Number-one films ==
†	This implies the highest-grossing movie of the year.

#	Weekend end date	Film	Box office	Openings in the top ten
1	5 January 2020	Frozen II †	$1,907,145	Richard Jewell (#3), 21 Bridges (#4), Sadako (#6), Bacurau (#9)
2	12 January 2020	Jumanji: The Next Level	$1,188,881	Jojo Rabbit (#4), Cats (#8)
3	19 January 2020	Frozen II †	$645,319	
4	26 January 2020	Frozen II †	$350,785	
5	2 February 2020	El robo del siglo	$727,533	1917 (#2), Little Women (#4), Spies in Disguise (#5)
6	9 February 2020	El robo del siglo	$640,222	Judy (#8)
7	16 February 2020	Sonic the Hedgehog	$759,324	The Grudge (#5)
8	23 February 2020	Sonic the Hedgehog	$444,805	Bad Boys for Life (#3), Bombshell (#7)
9	1 March 2020	Bad Boys for Life	$237,013	The Call of the Wild (#2)
10	8 March 2020	Onward	$501,216	The Gentlemen (#7)
11	15 March 2020	Onward	$148,534	
There is no box office data between March and September due to the COVID-19 pandemic.
39	27 September 2020	Onward	$1,123	
40	4 September 2020	Onward	$1,006	
41	11 October 2020	Onward	$843	
42	18 October 2020	Onward	$406	
43	25 October 2020	Onward	$1,824	
There is no box office data on the weekends of 1 November and November 8 due to the COVID-19 pandemic.
46	15 November 2020	Onward	$480	
47	22 November 2020	Onward	$131	
48	29 November 2020	Onward	$500	
49	6 December 2020	Onward	$374	
50	13 December 2020	Onward	$144	
51	20 December 2020	Onward	$62	
There is no box office data on the weekend of 27 December due to the COVID-19 pandemic.

== Highest-grossing films ==
Highest-grossing films of 2020
Rank	Title	Distributor	Domestic gross
1	Frozen II	Disney	$7,562,028
2	Jumanji: The Next Level	Sony Pictures / Columbia	$4,387,016
3	El robo del siglo	Warner Bros.	$3,185,186
4	Sonic the Hedgehog	Paramount	$2,517,216
5	Little Women	Sony Pictures / Columbia	$1,111,215
6	Parasite	CJ Entertainment	$1,100,369
7	Spies in Disguise	Fox	$1,061,192
8	1917	Sony Pictures / Columbia	$971,359
9	Star Wars: The Rise of Skywalker	Disney	$890,849
10	Bad Boys for Life	Sony Pictures / Columbia	$809,510
