= List of 2009 box office number-one films in Turkey =

This is a list of films which have placed number one at the weekly box office in Turkey during 2009. The weeks start on Fridays, and finish on Thursdays. The box-office number one is established in terms of tickets sold during the week.

== Highest-grossing films ==
=== In-Year Release ===
Highest-grossing films of 2009 by In-year release
Rank	Title	Distributor	Domestic gross
1.	Recep İvedik 2	Özen	₺33.493.187
2.	Breath	MVZ	₺19.720.380
3.	I Saw the Sun	Pin.	₺19.580.129
4.	2012	Warner Bros.	₺13.107.603
5.	Ice Age: Dawn of the Dinosaurs	Tiglon.	₺11.338.603
6.	The Twilight Saga: New Moon	Tiglon.	₺10.524.754
7.	Jolly Life	CF	₺9.325.921
8.	Avatar	Tiglon	₺7.615.252
9.	Valley of the Wolves: Gladio	Özen	₺6.826.717
10.	Angels & Demons	Warner Bros.	₺5.976.194
