= List of 2011 box office number-one films in Colombia =

This is a list of films which have placed number one at the weekend box office in Colombia during 2011.

== Number-one films ==
El Paseo became the highest grossing film of 2011, despite not reaching #1 during the year.

#	Date	Film	Gross
1	January 9, 2011	Tangled	$1,219,266
2	January 16, 2011	Tangled	$1,075,946
3	January 23, 2011	Tangled	$641,580
4	January 30, 2011	Yogi Bear	$700,713
5	February 6, 2011	Yogi Bear	$503,963
6	February 13, 2011	Yogi Bear	$354,727
7	February 20, 2011	The Rite	$422,680
8	February 27, 2011	The Rite	$328,368
9	March 6, 2011	Rango	$396,261
10	March 13, 2011	Battle: Los Angeles	$325,654
12	March 20, 2011	Battle: Los Angeles	$245,428
13	March 27, 2011	Big Mommas: Like Father, Like Son	$203,100
14	April 3, 2011	Just Go with It	$205,129
15	April 10, 2011	Rio	$1,423,780
16	April 17, 2011	Rio	$1,304,273
17	April 24, 2011	Rio	$1,187,984
18	May 1, 2011	Thor	$930,674
19	May 8, 2011	Fast Five	$738,817
20	May 15, 2011	Fast Five	$749,144
21	May 22, 2011	Pirates of the Caribbean: On Stranger Tides	$1,972,961
22	May 29, 2011	Pirates of the Caribbean: On Stranger Tides	$1,384,949
23	June 5, 2011	Pirates of the Caribbean: On Stranger Tides	$971,555
24	June 12, 2011	Kung Fu Panda 2	$1,721,349
25	June 19, 2011	Kung Fu Panda 2	$979,105
26	June 26, 2011	Cars 2	$1,484,727
27	July 3, 2011	Transformers: Dark of the Moon	$1,696,863
28	July 10, 2011	Transformers: Dark of the Moon	$1,167,463
29	July 17, 2011	Harry Potter and the Deathly Hallows – Part 2	$2,127,746
30	July 24, 2011	Harry Potter and the Deathly Hallows – Part 2	$1,007,427
31	July 31, 2011	Captain America: The First Avenger	$1,159,116
32	August 7, 2011	The Smurfs	$1,717,952
33	August 14, 2011	The Smurfs	$1,545,925
34	August 21, 2011	The Smurfs	$1,053,469
35	August 28, 2011	The Smurfs	$810,883
36	September 4, 2011	Final Destination 5	$614,748
37	September 11, 2011	Rise of the Planet of the Apes	$646,210
38	September 18, 2011	Rise of the Planet of the Apes	$537,291
39	September 25, 2011	Rise of the Planet of the Apes	$373,378
40	October 2, 2011	Rise of the Planet of the Apes	$279,941
41	October 9, 2011	Real Steel	$593,899
42	October 16, 2011	Real Steel	$589,412
43	October 23, 2011	Paranormal Activity 3	$372,263
44	November 6, 2011	Real Steel	$230,161
45	November 13, 2011	Jack and Jill	$202,363
46	November 20, 2011	The Twilight Saga: Breaking Dawn - Part 1	$1,265,785
47	November 27, 2011	The Twilight Saga: Breaking Dawn - Part 1	$617,198
48	December 4, 2011	Arthur Christmas	$380,659
49	December 11, 2011	Puss in Boots	$1,866,890
50	December 18, 2011	Puss in Boots	$973,546
51	December 25, 2011	Mission: Impossible – Ghost Protocol	$446,196
52	January 1, 2012	Puss in Boots	$395,077
