= List of 2017 box office number-one films in Argentina =

This is a list of films which placed number-one at the weekend box office in Argentina during 2017. Amounts are in American dollars.

#	Weekend end date	Film	Box office
1	January 8, 2017	Sing	$1,968,219
2	January 15, 2017	Sing	$1,065,292
3	January 22, 2017	Moana	$1,404,416
4	January 29, 2017	Moana	$952,455
5	February 5, 2017	Moana	$1,037,289
6	February 12, 2017	Fifty Shades Darker	$2,238,126
7	February 19, 2017	Rings	$800,266
8	February 26, 2017	The Ten Commandments: The Movie	$703,133
9	March 5, 2017	Logan	$1,578,587
12	March 26, 2017	Beauty and the Beast	$4,425,300
13	April 2, 2017	Beauty and the Beast	$2,600,559
14	April 9, 2017	Beauty and the Beast	$1,535,328
15	April 16, 2017	The Fate of the Furious	$8,827,179
16	April 23, 2017	The Fate of the Furious	$3,559,140
17	April 30, 2017	The Fate of the Furious	$1,972,618
18	May 7, 2017	Guardians of the Galaxy Vol. 2	$1,816,851
19	May 14, 2017	Guardians of the Galaxy Vol. 2	$915,321
20	May 21, 2017	Alien: Covenant	$601,840
21	May 28, 2017	Pirates of the Caribbean: Dead Men Tell No Tales	$2,945,701
22	June 4, 2017	Pirates of the Caribbean: Dead Men Tell No Tales	$1,445,102
23	June 11, 2017	The Mummy	$1,520,438
24	June 18, 2017	The Mummy	$833,818
25	June 25, 2017	The Mummy	$605,421
26	July 2, 2017	Despicable Me 3	$4,923,707
27	July 9, 2017	Despicable Me 3	$3,471,545
28	July 16, 2017	Despicable Me 3	$2,790,913
29	July 23, 2017	Despicable Me 3	$2,580,817
30	July 30, 2017	Despicable Me 3	$1,717,834
31	August 6, 2017	War for the Planet of the Apes	$1,369,572
32	August 13, 2017	El Fútbol o yo	$1,657,114
33	August 20, 2017	The Summit	$1,383,370
34	August 27, 2017	The Summit	$697,350
35	September 3, 2017	Annabelle: Creation	$2,620,282
36	September 10, 2017	Annabelle: Creation	$1,785,423
37	September 17, 2017	Annabelle: Creation	$808,904
38	September 24, 2017	It	$4,107,368
39	October 1, 2017	It	$2,499,284
40	October 8, 2017	It	$1,263,744
41	October 15, 2017	It	$600,321
42	October 22, 2017	Geostorm	$884,641
43	October 29, 2017	Thor: Ragnarok	$2,002,498
44	November 5, 2017	Thor: Ragnarok	$1,190,101
45	November 12, 2017	Thor: Ragnarok	$709,082
46	November 19, 2017	Justice League	$2,049,187
47	November 26, 2017	Justice League	$941,025
48	December 3, 2017	Justice League	$675,977
49	December 10, 2017	Justice League	$430,112
50	December 17, 2017	Star Wars: The Last Jedi	$2,170,483
51	December 24, 2017	Star Wars: The Last Jedi	$635,860
52	December 31, 2017	Star Wars: The Last Jedi	$422,157

== Highest-grossing films ==
Highest-grossing films of 2017
Rank	Title	Distributor	Domestic gross
1	The Fate of the Furious	UIP	$18,239,438
2	Beauty and the Beast	Disney	$11,594,071
3	Pirates of the Caribbean: Dead Men Tell No Tales	Disney	$8,914,657
4	The Boss Baby	Fox	$8,706,320
5	Mamá se fue de viaje	Disney	$8,276,056
6	Cars 3	Disney	$7,854,673
7	Moana	Disney	$7,437,286
8	Spider-Man: Homecoming	UIP	$7,033,029
9	Justice League	Warner Bros.	$6,400,000
10	Thor: Ragnarok	Disney	$6,169,643
