= List of 2018 box office number-one films in Chile =

This is a list of films which placed number-one at the weekend box office in Chile during 2018. Amounts are in American dollars.

== Films ==
#	Weekend end date	Film	Box office
1	January 7, 2018	Jumanji: Welcome to the Jungle	$697,607
2	January 14, 2018	Ferdinand	$517,432
3	January 21, 2018	Coco	$410,599
4	January 28, 2018	Maze Runner: The Death Cure	$506,344
5	February 4, 2018	Coco	$365,820
6	February 11, 2018	Fifty Shades Freed	$812,934
7	February 18, 2018	Black Panther	$1,156,408
8	February 25, 2018	Black Panther	$725,858
9	March 4, 2018	Black Panther	$612,622
10	March 11, 2018	Black Panther	$387,404
11	March 18, 2018	Black Panther	$235,079
12	March 25, 2018	Pacific Rim: Uprising	$429,870
13	April 1, 2018	Pacific Rim: Uprising	$240,573
14	April 8, 2018	A Quiet Place	$216,356
15	April 15, 2018	A Quiet Place	$204,849
16	April 22, 2018	A Quiet Place	$142,674
17	April 29, 2018	Avengers: Infinity War	$4,525,397
18	May 6, 2018	Avengers: Infinity War	$2,893,456
19	May 13, 2018	Avengers: Infinity War	$1,269,080
20	May 20, 2018	Deadpool 2	$1,963,677
21	May 27, 2018	Solo: A Star Wars Story	$453,138
22	June 3, 2018	Deadpool 2	$851,271
23	June 10, 2018	Deadpool 2	$466,140
24	June 17, 2018	Incredibles 2	$1,854,204
25	June 24, 2018	Jurassic World: Fallen Kingdom	$1,589,733
26	July 1, 2018	Jurassic World: Fallen Kingdom	$1,253,177
27	July 8, 2018	Jurassic World: Fallen Kingdom	$684,646
28	July 15, 2018	Hotel Transylvania 3: Summer Vacation	$1,225,273
29	July 22, 2018	Hotel Transylvania 3: Summer Vacation	$1,215,833
30	July 29, 2018	Hotel Transylvania 3: Summer Vacation	$868,600
31	August 5, 2018	Hotel Transylvania 3: Summer Vacation	$524,730
32	August 12, 2018	Hotel Transylvania 3: Summer Vacation	$230,374
33	August 19, 2018	Hotel Transylvania 3: Summer Vacation	$140,917
34	August 26, 2018	Slender Man	$112,539
35	September 2, 2018	Mamma Mia! Here We Go Again	$130,755
36	September 9, 2018	Alpha	$151,189
37	September 16, 2018	Alpha	$88,593
38	September 23, 2018	The House with a Clock in Its Walls	$236,755
39	September 30, 2018	The House with a Clock in Its Walls	$130,207
40	October 7, 2018	Venom	$998,672
41	October 14, 2018	Venom	$639,829
42	October 21, 2018	Venom	$361,749
43	October 28, 2018	Venom	$210,565
44	November 4, 2018	Bohemian Rhapsody	$1,259,970
45	November 11, 2018	Bohemian Rhapsody	$834,876
49	December 9, 2018	Ralph Breaks the Internet	$406,195
50	December 16, 2018	Ralph Breaks the Internet	$258,628
52	December 30, 2018	Aquaman	$868,848

== Highest-grossing films ==
Highest-grossing films of 2018
Rank	Title	Distributor	Domestic gross
1	Avengers: Infinity War	Disney	$14,607,578
2	Incredibles 2	Disney	$8,963,661
3	Jurassic World: Fallen Kingdom	Universal	$7,795,431
4	Hotel Transylvania 3: Summer Vacation	Sony	$6,535,115
5	Deadpool 2	Fox	$6,230,504
6	Bohemian Rhapsody	Fox	$5,052,624
7	Black Panther	Disney	$4,942,845
8	Ralph Breaks the Internet	Disney	$4,231,371
9	Ferdinand	Fox	$3,456,272
10	Venom	Sony	$3,401,811
