= List of 2014 box office number-one films in Venezuela =

This is a list of films which placed number one at the weekend box office for the year 2014.

== Number-one films ==
†	This implies the highest-grossing movie of the year.

#	Date	Film	Gross	Notes
1	January 5, 2014	Frozen	$1,377,893	
2	January 12, 2014	Frozen	$993,285	
3	January 19, 2014	Frozen	$845,570	
4	January 26, 2014	Frozen	$609,317	
5	February 2, 2014	Walking with Dinosaurs	$626,334	
6	February 9, 2014	Papita, maní, tostón	$570,009	
7	February 16, 2014	Papita, maní, tostón	$599,845	
8	February 23, 2014	Papita, maní, tostón	$280,599	
9	March 2, 2014	Papita, maní, tostón	$403,869	
10	March 9, 2014	300: Rise of an Empire	$525,843	
11	March 16, 2014	300: Rise of an Empire	$584,122	
12	March 23, 2014	The Lego Movie	$543,650	
13	March 30, 2014	Captain America: The Winter Soldier	$1,309,107	
14	April 6, 2014	Captain America: The Winter Soldier	$1,179,260	
15	April 13, 2014	Captain America: The Winter Soldier	$965,252	
16	April 20, 2014	Captain America: The Winter Soldier	$917,873	
17	April 27, 2014	The Amazing Spider-Man 2	$1,524,322	
18	May 4, 2014	Rio 2	$1,711,134	
19	May 11, 2014	Rio 2	$1,399,724	
20	May 18, 2014	Rio 2	$1,701,415	
21	May 25, 2014	Rio 2	$1,371,549	
22	June 1, 2014	Maleficent †	$1,904,584	Maleficent had the highest weekend debut of 2014.
23	June 8, 2014	Maleficent †	$2,375,802	In its second weekend, Maleficent had the highest weekend of 2014.
24	June 15, 2014	Maleficent †	$1,757,308	
25	June 22, 2014	X-Men: Days of Future Past	$1,790,877	
26	June 29, 2014	X-Men: Days of Future Past	$1,152,208	
27	July 6, 2014	X-Men: Days of Future Past	$1,184,842	
28	July 13, 2014	Maleficent †	$791,037	Maleficent reclaimed the #1 spot in its seventh weekend of release.
29	July 20, 2014	How to Train Your Dragon 2	$1,645,988	
30	July 27, 2014	How to Train Your Dragon 2	$1,145,408	
31	August 3, 2014	How to Train Your Dragon 2	$1,029,066	
32	August 10, 2014	Guardians of the Galaxy	$1,702,832	
33	August 17, 2014	Guardians of the Galaxy	$1,503,882	
34	August 24, 2014	Transformers: Age of Extinction	$1,746,642	
35	August 31, 2014	Transformers: Age of Extinction	$1,523,700	
36	September 7, 2014	Dawn of the Planet of the Apes	$1,160,778	
37	September 14, 2014	Dawn of the Planet of the Apes	$880,531	
38	September 21, 2014	Transformers: Age of Extinction	$618,674	Transformers: Age of Extinction reclaimed the #1 spot in its fifth weekend of release.
39	September 28, 2014	Sex Tape	$469,256	
40	October 5, 2014	Teenage Mutant Ninja Turtles	$1,167,833	
41	October 12, 2014	Teenage Mutant Ninja Turtles	$908,623	
42	October 19, 2014	Teenage Mutant Ninja Turtles	$806,156	
43	October 26, 2014	Annabelle	$731,922	
44	November 2, 2014	Annabelle	$985,253	
45	November 9, 2014	Annabelle	$623,657	
46	November 16, 2014	Annabelle	$315,380	
47	November 23, 2014	The Hunger Games: Mockingjay – Part 1	$754,936	
48	November 30, 2014	The Hunger Games: Mockingjay – Part 1	$664,165	
49	December 7, 2014	The Hunger Games: Mockingjay – Part 1	$459,927	
50	December 14, 2014	Big Hero 6	$1,148,024	
51	December 21, 2014	The Hunger Games: Mockingjay – Part 1	$214,358	The Hunger Games: Mockingjay – Part 1 reclaimed the #1 spot in its fifth weekend of release.
52	December 28, 2014	Horrible Bosses 2	$344,177	

== Highest-grossing films ==
Highest-grossing films of 2014 in Venezuela
Rank	Title	Studio	Domestic Gross
1.	Maleficent	Walt Disney Pictures	$13,376,780
2.	X-Men: Days of Future Past	20th Century Fox	$12,261,060
3.	Captain America: The Winter Soldier	Walt Disney Pictures / Marvel Studios	$10,076,143
4.	The Hunger Games: Mockingjay – Part 1	Lionsgate	$9,340,966
5.	Rio 2	20th Century Fox / Blue Sky Studios	$8,364,251
6.	The Amazing Spider-Man 2	Columbia Pictures	$7,337,924
7.	Transformers: Age of Extinction	Paramount Pictures / Hasbro Studios	$6,697,167
8.	Guardians of the Galaxy	Walt Disney Pictures / Marvel Studios	$6,016,230
9.	How to Train Your Dragon 2	20th Century Fox / DreamWorks Animation	$5,577,498
10.	The Liberator	Producciones Insurgentes / San Mateo Films	$4,969,031

== See also ==
- List of American films — American films by year
