= List of 2021 box office number-one films in Turkey =

This is a list of films which placed number one at the weekly box office in Turkey during 2021. The weeks start on Fridays, and finish on Thursdays. The box-office number one is established in terms of tickets sold during the week.

== Box office number-one films ==
†	This implies the highest-grossing movie of the year.

Week	End date for the week	Film	Gross (₺)	Tickets sold	Note(s)
1 - 26	Movie theaters shut down due to COVID-19				
27	July 8, 2021	Fast & Furious 9	₺7.800.029	332.369	
28	July 15, 2021	Black Widow	₺4.263.259	177.038	
29	July 22, 2021	Fast & Furious 9	₺3.027.026	127.270	
30	July 29, 2021	Fast & Furious 9	₺2.539.091	111.715	
31	August 5, 2021	The Suicide Squad	₺1.700.410	69.078	
32	August 12, 2021	Fast & Furious 9	₺1.202.434	53.533	
33	August 19, 2021	Free Guy	₺1.321.831	50.577	
34	August 26, 2021	Free Guy	₺972.706	39.820	
35	September 2, 2021	Free Guy	₺834.054	32.102	
36	September 9, 2021	Shang-Chi and the Legend of the Ten Rings	₺2.488.862	95.678	
37	September 16, 2021	Shang-Chi and the Legend of the Ten Rings	₺1.386.092	56.071	
38	September 23, 2021	The Boss Baby: Family Business	₺1.378.770	63.528	
39	September 30, 2021	Âkif	₺1.778.032	177.590	
40	October 7, 2021	Âkif	₺1.474.952	147.182	
41	October 14, 2021	No Time to Die	₺1.959.995	69.727	
42	October 21, 2021	Venom: Let There Be Carnage	₺6.281.847	266.720	
43	October 28, 2021	Dune	₺5.032.565	189.325	
44	November 4, 2021	Dune	₺3.383.978	123.057	
45	November 11, 2021	Eternals	₺4.062.637	162.442	
46	November 18, 2021	The Addams Family 2	₺2.461.739	118.947	
47	November 25, 2021	The Addams Family 2	₺1.294.267	59.783	
48	December 2, 2021	Encanto	₺1.861.490	80.073	
49	December 9, 2021	Aykut Enişte 2	₺6.633.651	278.099	
50	December 16, 2021	Aykut Enişte 2	₺4.322.762	179.038	
51	December 23, 2021	Spider-Man: No Way Home †	₺33.542.969	1.327.674	
52	December 30, 2021	Spider-Man: No Way Home †	₺13.233.678	522.280	

== Highest-grossing films ==
=== In-Year Release ===
Highest-grossing films of 2021 by In-year release
Rank	Title	Distributor	Domestic gross
1.	Spider-Man: No Way Home	Warner Bros.	₺46.776.647
2.	F9	UIP	₺22.184.969
3.	Aykut Enişte 2	CJ ENM	₺16.181.415
4.	Dune	Warner Bros.	₺15.959.027
5.	Venom: Let There Be Carnage	Warner Bros.	₺15.333.040
6.	Eternals	UIP	₺9.171.784
7.	Dayı: Bir Adamın Hikâyesi	CGV Mars	₺8.763.067
8.	Black Widow	UIP	₺8.723.744
9.	The Matrix Resurrections	Warner Bros.	₺8.607.594
10.	The Boss Baby: Family Business	UIP	₺7.046.456
