= List of 2012 box office number-one films in Turkey =

This is a list of films which have placed number one at the weekly box office in Turkey during 2012. The weeks start on Fridays, and finish on Thursdays. The box-office number one is established in terms of tickets sold during the week.

== Box office number-one films ==
†	This implies the highest-grossing movie of the year.

#	Date	Film	Tickets sold
1	January 5, 2012	Sümela'nın Şifresi: Temel	273,690
2	January 12, 2012	Sümela'nın Şifresi: Temel	198,737
3	January 19, 2012	Puss in Boots	209,171
4	January 26, 2012	Puss in Boots	237,358
5	February 2, 2012	Berlin Kaplanı	889,193
6	February 9, 2012	Berlin Kaplanı	519,665
7	February 16, 2012	Berlin Kaplanı	281,859
8	February 23, 2012	Fetih 1453 †	2,233,041
9	March 1, 2012	Fetih 1453 †	1,630,117
10	March 8, 2012	Fetih 1453 †	937,421
11	March 15, 2012	Fetih 1453 †	623,418
12	March 22, 2012	Fetih 1453 †	343,374
13	March 29, 2012	The Hunger Games	199,840
14	April 5, 2012	Wrath of the Titans	191,313
15	April 12, 2012	Wrath of the Titans	99,886
16	April 19, 2012	Wrath of the Titans	64,191
17	April 26, 2012	Battleship	118,525
18	May 3, 2012	Battleship	68,803
19	May 10, 2012	The Avengers	278,950
20	May 27, 2012	The Avengers	156,729
21	May 24, 2012	The Avengers	125,651
22	May 31, 2012	Men in Black 3	83,426
23	June 7, 2012	Snow White and the Huntsman	129,354
24	June 14, 2012	Madagascar 3: Europe's Most Wanted	197,709
25	June 21, 2012	Madagascar 3: Europe's Most Wanted	113,179
26	June 28, 2012	Madagascar 3: Europe's Most Wanted	86,417
27	July 5, 2012	Ice Age: Continental Drift	493,525
28	July 12, 2012	Ice Age: Continental Drift	372,934
29	July 19, 2012	Ice Age: Continental Drift	287,472
30	July 26, 2012	Ice Age: Continental Drift	184,644
31	August 2, 2012	The Dark Knight Rises	332,509
32	August 9, 2012	The Dark Knight Rises	179,421
33	August 16, 2012	Total Recall	106,205
34	August 23, 2012	The Expendables 2	240,212
35	August 30, 2012	The Expendables 2	121,385
36	September 6, 2012	The Expendables 2	74,713
37	September 13, 2012	Brave	136,407
38	September 20, 2012	Resident Evil: Retribution	136,918
39	September 27, 2012	Resident Evil: Retribution	80,017
40	October 4, 2012	Çanakkale Çocukları	89,175
41	October 11, 2012	Çanakkale Çocukları	61,655
42	October 18, 2012	Uzun Hikâye	170,903
43	October 25, 2012	Canakkale 1915	197,259
44	November 1, 2012	Canakkale 1915	258,172
45	November 8, 2012	Evim Sensin	525,274
46	November 15, 2012	Evim Sensin	569,593
47	November 22, 2012	The Twilight Saga: Breaking Dawn – Part 2	642,847
48	November 29, 2012	The Twilight Saga: Breaking Dawn – Part 2	358,871
49	December 6, 2012	Evim Sensin	255,772
50	December 13, 2012	Çakallarla Dans 2: Hastasıyız Dede	358,781
51	December 20, 2012	The Hobbit: An Unexpected Journey	446,975
52	December 27, 2012	The Hobbit: An Unexpected Journey	291,615
53	January 3, 2013	The Hobbit: An Unexpected Journey	180,686

== Highest-grossing films ==
=== In-Year Release ===
Highest-grossing films of 2012 by In-year release
Rank	Title	Distributor	Domestic gross
1	Fetih 1453	Tiglon	₺55.710.841
2.	Evim Sensin	UIP	₺23.690.977
3.	Ice Age: Continental Drift	Tiglon	₺18.464.193
4.	Berlin Kaplanı	UIP	₺18.246.578
5.	Sen Kimsin?	UIP	₺14.218.718
6.	The Twilight Saga: Breaking Dawn – Part 2	Tiglon	₺13.063.637
7.	The Hobbit: An Unexpected Journey	Warner Bros.	₺10.741.573
8.	The Dark Knight Rises	Warner Bros.	₺8.428.692
9.	Çakallarla Dans 2: Hastasıyız Dede	Warner Bros.	₺7.685.732
10.	The Avengers	UIP	₺7.660.682
