= List of 2010 box office number-one films in Ecuador =

This is a list of films which have placed number one at the weekend box office in Ecuador during 2010.

== Number-one films ==
†	This implies the highest-grossing movie of the year.

#	Date	Film	Gross
1	January 3, 2010	Avatar	$736,385
2	January 10, 2010	Avatar	$451,345
3	January 17, 2010	Avatar	$508,987
4	January 24, 2010	Sherlock Holmes	$433,731
5	January 31, 2010	Tooth Fairy	$398,819
6	February 7, 2010	Tooth Fairy	$426,616
7	February 14, 2010	Old Dogs	$439,357
8	February 21, 2010	Old Dogs	$436,406
9	February 28, 2010	Old Dogs	$396,496
10	March 7, 2010	Alice in Wonderland	$704,221
11	March 14, 2010	Alice in Wonderland	$569,062
12	March 21, 2010	Alice in Wonderland	$464,520
13	March 28, 2010	How to Train Your Dragon	$521,133
14	April 4, 2010	How to Train Your Dragon	$583,918
15	April 11, 2010	How to Train Your Dragon	$417,340
16	April 18, 2010	How to Train Your Dragon	$398,773
17	April 25, 2010	Clash of the Titans	$595,439
18	May 2, 2010	Iron Man 2	$736,811
19	May 9, 2010	Iron Man 2	$498,791
20	May 16, 2010	Iron Man 2	$465,965
21	May 23, 2010	A Nightmare on Elm Street	$539,696
22	May 30, 2010	Prince of Persia: The Sands of Time	$579,108
23	June 6, 2010	Prince of Persia: The Sands of Time	$513,227
24	June 13, 2010	Prince of Persia: The Sands of Time	$420,131
25	June 20, 2010	Toy Story 3 †	$834,571
26	June 27, 2010	Toy Story 3 †	$691,137
27	July 4, 2010	Toy Story 3 †	$595,762
28	July 11, 2010	Shrek Forever After	$751,941
29	July 18, 2010	The Twilight Saga: Eclipse	$968,460
30	July 25, 2010	Shrek Forever After	$804,864
31	August 1, 2010	Despicable Me	$698,491
32	August 8, 2010	Despicable Me	$569,453
33	August 15, 2010	The Karate Kid	$595,764
34	August 22, 2010	Cats & Dogs: The Revenge of Kitty Galore	$505,467
35	August 29, 2010	The Karate Kid	$112,399
36	September 5, 2010	Cats & Dogs: The Revenge of Kitty Galore	$409,378
37	September 12, 2010	Resident Evil: Afterlife	$522,153
38	September 19, 2010	Resident Evil: Afterlife	$462,223
39	September 26, 2010	Resident Evil: Afterlife	$388,923
40	October 3, 2010	Resident Evil: Afterlife	$342,583
41	October 10, 2010	Piranha 3D	$342,608
42	October 17, 2010	Piranha 3D	$281,176
43	October 31, 2010	Legend of the Guardians: The Owls of Ga'Hoole	$291,135
44	November 7, 2010	A Turtle's Tale: Sammy's Adventures	$85,503
45	November 14, 2010	Legend of the Guardians: The Owls of Ga'Hoole	$221,972
46	November 21, 2010	Harry Potter and the Deathly Hallows – Part 1	$671,374
47	December 5, 2010	The Chronicles of Narnia: The Voyage of the Dawn Treader	$516,750
48	December 12, 2010	The Chronicles of Narnia: The Voyage of the Dawn Treader	$537,158
49	December 19, 2010	The Chronicles of Narnia: The Voyage of the Dawn Treader	$405,851
50	December 26, 2010	Tron: Legacy	$591,938
51	January 2, 2011	Tron: Legacy	$590,510
