= List of highest-grossing films in Romania =

The following lists represent the highest-grossing films in Romania. This lists only accounts for the films' theatrical box office earning and not their ancillary revenues (i.e. home video rental and sales and television broadcast).

In 2009 there was a significant increase in the Romanian box office due to rising of inflation, the appearance of new theaters in several cities of the country and a higher effort in promoting the films. In April 2014, Cinema City International, who is the main cinema operator in Romania, plans 22 new cinema openings in Romania between 2014 and 2016.

== Romania's highest-grossing films ==
The most represented years on the list are 2023, 2024, 2025 and 2026 with 7 films each. Titanic is the first film in Romania to surpass the 1 million lei mark, Avatar is the first film to surpass the 10 and 20 million lei mark, and Avatar: The Way of Water is the first film to surpass the 30 million lei mark.

Background shading indicates films playing in the week commencing 13 November 2026 in Romanian theaters.

Rank	Title	Romanian Leu	U.S. dollar	Year	Ref
1	Avatar: The Way of Water	39,042,404	$8,460,382	2022	(Note: Avatar: The Way of Water Original release: "Box Office Romania - 12.12.22-12.18.22". CineMagia.ro. Lifetime: "Avatar: The Way of Water". CineMagia.ro.)
2	Avatar: Fire and Ash	30,955,303	$7,135,167	2025	
3	Teambuilding	23,576,362	$4,746,332	2022	
4	The Odyssey	22,282,387	$4,881,167	2026	
5	Golden Boyz	21,467,436	$4,957,377	2026	
6	Spider-Man: Brand New Day	20,691,016	$4,552,305	2026	
7	Avatar	20,153,235	$6,636,974	2009	(Note: Avatar Original release: 18.537.471 ($6,317,366) "Box Office Romania - 07.05.10-07.11.10". CineMagia.ro. Lifetime: "Avatar". CineMagia.ro.)
8	Avengers: Endgame	16,058,241	$3,733,126	2019	(Note: Avengers: Endgame Original release: "Box Office Romania - 23.07.19-29.07.19". CineMagia.ro. Lifetime: "Avengers: Endgame". CineMagia.ro.)
9	Michael	16,047,195	$3,604,925	2026	
10	Aquaman	15,722,391	$3,848,753	2018	
11	The Yellow Tie	15,522,067	$3,548,657	2025	
12	Deadpool & Wolverine	15,504,433	$3,405,662	2024	
13	Miami Bici 2	15,059,007	$3,310,985	2023	
14	Zootopia 2	14,720,492	$3,379,543	2025	
15	Inside Out 2	14,040,853	$3,050,362	2024	
16	Barbie	13,839,596	$3,073,458	2023	
17	Spider-Man: No Way Home	13,610,424	$3,116,598	2021	
18	Country Love	13,550,577	$3,112,913	2026	
19	Star Wars: The Force Awakens	13,515,925	$3,256,966	2015	
20	Frozen 2	13,453,922	$3,119,154	2019	
21	The Fate of the Furious	13,316,052	$3,171,017	2017	
22	A Minecraft Movie	13,311,775	$3,001,765	2025	
23	Buzz House: The Movie	13,271,140	$2,865,166	2024	
24	Teambuilding 2	12,794,987	$2,686,088	2026	
25	Oppenheimer	12,176,560	$2,699,647	2023	
26	Miami Bici	11,658,637	$2,679,326	2020	(Note: Miami Bici Original release: 11,633,276 ($2,673,828) "Box Office Romania - 03.09.20-03.15.20". CineMagia.ro. 2023 re-release: 25,361 ($5,498) "Box Office Romania - 11.20.23-11.26.23". CineMagia.ro.)
27	Dune: Part Two	11,540,336	$2,519,803	2024	
28	The Neighbor	11,421,966	$2,614,966	2025	
29	Furious 7	11,187,310	$2,739,771	2015	
30	Joker	11,126,579	$2,586,493	2019	
31	Jumanji: Welcome to the Jungle	11,093,679	$2,895,908	2017	
32	Part-Time Dads	10,897,787	$2,387,904	2024	
33	Lilo & Stitch	10,893,474	$2,464,595	2025	
34	Fast X	10,864,633	$2,359,866	2023	
35	The Hobbit: The Battle of the Five Armies	10,858,515	$2,939,962	2014	
36	Jumanji: The Next Level	10,574,332	$2,461,607	2019	
37	Aquaman and the Lost Kingdom	10,291,249	$2,268,950	2023	
38	Venom	10,029,468	$2,467,892	2018	
39	Avengers: Infinity War	9,992,353	$2,568,252	2018	
40	Millionaire Boy	9,966,829	$2,090,110	2026	
41	Hobbs & Shaw	9,803,112	$2,301,929	2019	
42	Top Gun: Maverick	9,611,194	$2,044,737	2022	
43	Romina, VTM	9,499,089	$2,045,983	2023	
44	The Marriage	9,429,082	$1,976,483	2024	
45	Bad Boys for Life	9,381,164	$2,168,178	2020	
46	Moana 2	9,365,663	$1,971,787	2024	
47	Bohemian Rhapsody	9,213,080	$2,245,666	2018	
48	F1	9,168,520	$2,113,759	2025	
49	Pirates of the Caribbean: Dead Men Tell No Tales	9,159,517	$2,256,356	2017	
50	Money Wedding	9,157,979	$1,957,242	2023	

== Highest grossing films by admissions ==
This is a list by Romania's National Center for Cinematography sorted by the highest ticket sales and adjusted gross as of 2025 with the average ticket price of 28.5.

Rank	Title	Year	Ticket sales	Adjusted gross
1	Uncle Marin, the Billionaire	1979	14,645,586	417,399,201
2	Păcală	1974	14,644,029	417,354,827
3	Michael the Brave	1971	13,340,304	380,198,664
4	The Dacians	1967	13,135,474	374,361,009
5	The Family of The Soimărești	1965	13,051,558	371,969,403
6	Tudor	1963	11,411,828	325,237,098
7	The Column	1968	10,508,376	299,488,716
8	Outlaws	1966	8,850,537	252,240,305
9	Seven Boys and a Little Girl	1967	7,547,339	215,099,162
10	Stephen the Great - Vaslui 1475	1975	7,372,294	210,110,379
11	The Immortals	1974	7,292,165	207,826,703
12	With Clean Hands	1972	7,162,552	204,132,732
13	The Prophet, the Gold and the Transylvanians	1978	6,831,053	194,685,011
14	Adventures on the Black Sea	1972	6,769,780	192,938,730
15	Bone Path	1980	6,587,344	187,739,304
16	Revenge	1978	6,359,884	181,256,694
17	A Police Superintendent Accuses	1974	6,146,991	175,189,244
18	The Outlaws of Captain Anghel	1971	6,003,214	171,091,599
19	The Revenge of the Outlaws	1968	5.930.641	169,023,269
20	Jderi Brothers	1974	5,928,564	168,964,074

== Highest weekend gross ==
This list is ranked only in Romanian Lei. Ice Age: Dawn of the Dinosaurs is the first film to gross over 1 million lei in a weekend, The Twilight Saga: Breaking Dawn - Part 2 is the first to gross over 2 million lei in a weekend, The Hobbit: The Battle of the Five Armies is the first to gross over 3 million lei in a weekend and The Fate of the Furious is the first to gross over 4, 5, 6 and 7 million lei in a weekend.

Rank	Title	Weekend	Gross (RON)	Ref
1	The Fate of the Furious	April 21–23, 2017	7,443,186	
2	Buzz House: The Movie	April 26-28, 2024	7,211,155	
3	Golden Boyz	February 6-8, 2026	6,825,575	
4	Romina, VTM	January 6–8, 2023	6,553,905	
5	Avatar: The Way of Water	December 16–18, 2022	6,305,847	
6	Avatar: Fire and Ash	December 26-28, 2025	5,955,597	
7	Spider-Man: Brand New Day	July 31-August 2, 2026	5,712,580	
8	Avatar: Fire and Ash	December 19-21, 2025	5,683,454	
9	Country Love	January 2-4, 2026	5,635,112	
10	Miami Bici 2	November 24-26, 2023	5,281,140	
11	Teambuilding	September 30-October 2, 2022	4,914,907	
12	Teambuilding 2	October 9-11, 2026	4,574,479	
13	Part-Time Dads	January 5-7, 2024	4,220,824	
14	Avatar: Fire and Ash	January 2-4, 2026	4,041,219	
15	Star Wars: The Force Awakens	December 18–20, 2015	3,975,328	
16	A Minecraft Movie	April 4-6, 2025	3,890,977	
17	Fast X	May 19–21, 2023	3,870,109	
18	Avengers: Endgame	April 26–28, 2019	3,855,954	
19	Frozen 2	November 22–24, 2019	3,782,858	
20	Deadpool & Wolverine	July 26-28, 2024	3,679,086	

== Highest-grossing films by year ==
The charts are based on films that premiered on a Romanian release date and not the film's worldwide release date.

Year	Title	Gross (RON)	Ref
1993	Hot Shots! Part Deux	27,281	
1994	The Second Fall of Constantinople	58,314	
1994	Jurassic Park	263,728 (38,090)	(Note: Jurassic Park: "Jurassic Park 1994 release". CineMagia.ro.; "Jurassic Park 3D re-release". CineMagia.ro.)
1995	The Specialist	61,784	
1996	Independence Day	148,436	
1997	101 Dalmatians	215,238	
1998	Titanic	4,059,534 (1,590,451)	(Note: Titanic: "Titanic 1998 release". CineMagia.ro. "1,590,451"; "Titanic 3D re-release". CineMagia.ro. "919,845"; "2023 re-release". CineMagia.ro. "1,541,777")
1999	The Mummy	334,654	
1999	Star Wars: Episode I – The Phantom Menace	709,205 (326,791)	(Note: Star Wars Episode I: The Phantom Menace: "The Phantom Menace 1999 release". CineMagia.ro.; "The Phantom Menace 3D re-release". CineMagia.ro.)
2000	Gladiator	468,695	
2001	The Mummy Returns	630,287	
2002	Garcea and the Oltenians	799,585	
2003	The Matrix Reloaded	1,188,301	
2004	The Lord of the Rings: The Return of the King	1,213,854	
2005	Star Wars: Episode III – Revenge of the Sith	1,103,843	
2006	The Da Vinci Code	1,448,321	
2007	Pirates of the Caribbean: At World's End	1,081,159	
2008	Journey to the Center of the Earth	1,984,880	
2009	Avatar	20,153,235 (18,537,471)	
2010	Alice in Wonderland	4,572,425	
2011	Pirates of the Caribbean: On Stranger Tides	6,725,190	
2012	The Hobbit: An Unexpected Journey	8,278,047	
2013	The Hobbit: The Desolation of Smaug	7,959,529	
2014	The Hobbit: The Battle of the Five Armies	10,858,515	
2015	Star Wars: The Force Awakens	13,515,925	
2016	Suicide Squad	8,323,197	
2017	The Fate of the Furious	13,316,052	
2018	Aquaman	15,722,391	
2019	Avengers: Endgame	16,058,241 (14,401,724)	
2020	Miami Bici	11,658,637 (11,633,276)	
2021	Spider-Man: No Way Home	13,610,424	
2022	Avatar: The Way of Water	39,042,404 (38,557,592)	
2023	Miami Bici 2	15,059,007	
2024	Deadpool & Wolverine	15,504,433	
2025	Avatar: Fire and Ash	30,955,303	
2026	The Odyssey	22,282,387	

== Highest-grossing animated films ==
This is the list of highest-grossing animated films. Four of these films are also in the Top 50 Romania's highest-grossing films list. 2024 is the most represented year with 5 films.

Background shading indicates films playing in the week commencing 13 November 2026 in Romanian theaters.

Rank	Title	Romanian Leu	U.S. dollar	Year	Ref
1	Zootopia 2	14,720,492	$3,379,543	2025	
2	Inside Out 2	14,040,853	$3,050,362	2024	
3	Frozen 2	13,453,922	$3,119,154	2019	
4	Moana 2	9,365,663	$1,971,787	2024	
5	Minions: The Rise of Gru	8,614,875	$1,779,215	2022	
6	Mufasa: The Lion King	8,485,313	$1,768,539	2024	
7	Despicable Me 4	8,323,736	$1,825,535	2024	
8	The Lion King	8,199,103	$1,931,609	2019	
9	Minions	8,148,891	$2,033,405	2015	
10	Puss in Boots: The Last Wish	7,481,831	$1,622,366	2022	
11	Ice Age: Continental Drift	7,036,356	$1,905,338	2012	
12	Hotel Transylvania 3: Summer Vacation	7,032,003	$1,754,203	2018	
13	Ice Age: Dawn of the Dinosaurs	6,876,271	$2,298,007	2009	
14	The Super Mario Galaxy Movie	6,344,183	$1,439,316	2026	
15	The Super Mario Bros. Movie	5,848,898	$1,294,763	2023	
16	Minions & Monsters	5,442,657	$1,190,269	2026	
17	Frozen	5,369,078	$1,634,424	2013	
18	Kung Fu Panda 4	5,307,894	$1,154,083	2024	
19	Turning Red	5,265,886	$1,162,760	2022	
20	The Boss Baby	5,264,392	$1,261,290	2017	

== Highest-grossing Romanian films ==
This is the list of highest-grossing Romanian films. Child's Pose is the first Romanian film to surpass the 1 million lei mark, Selfie 69 is the first romanian film to surpass the 2 million lei mark, Moromete Family: On the Edge of Time is the first romanian film to surpass the 3 million lei mark, Oh, Ramona! is the first romanian film to surpass the 4 and 5 lei marks, 5Gang: A Different Kind of Christmas is the first romanian film to surpass the 6 million lei mark, and Miami Bici is the first romanian film to surpass the 7, 8, 9 and 10 million lei marks, Teambuilding is the first romanian film to surpass 20 million lei mark. 2023, 2024, 2025 and 2026 are the most represented years with 4 films each. Twelve of this films are in the Top 50 Romania's highest-grossing films.

Background shading indicates films playing in the week commencing 13 November 2026 in Romanian theaters.

Rank	Title	Romanian Leu	U.S. dollar	Year	Ref
1	Teambuilding	23,576,222	$4,746,301	2022	
2	Golden Boyz	21,467,436	$4,957,377	2026	
3	The Yellow Tie	15,522,067	$3,548,657	2025	
4	Miami Bici 2	15,059,007	$3,310,985	2023	
5	Country Love	13,550,577	$3,112,913	2026	
6	Buzz House: The Movie	13,271,140	$2,865,166	2024	
7	Teambuilding 2	12,794,987	$2,686,088	2026	
8	Miami Bici	11,658,637	$2,679,326	2020	
9	The Neighbor	11,421,966	$2,614,966	2025	
10	Part-Time Dads	10,897,787	$2,387,904	2024	
11	Millionaire Boy	9,966,829	$2,090,110	2026	
12	Romina, VTM	9,499,089	$2,045,983	2023	
13	The Marriage	9,429,082	$1,976,483	2024	
14	Money Wedding	9,157,979	$1,957,242	2023	
15	Death on Vacation	8,631,135	$1,853,164	2024	
16	The Race	8,242,648	$1,878,352	2025	
17	Mirciulica	8,219,201	$1,645,970	2022	
18	Buzz House: The Movie 2	7,968,316	$1,812,537	2025	
19	Action Pack	7,901,750	$1,729,639	2023	
20	5Gang: A Different Kind of Christmas	6,488,206	$1,510,174	2019	

== Timeline of highest-grossing film in Romania ==
Timeline since 1996
Title	Established	Record-setting gross	Ref
Independence Day	1996	148,436	
101 Dalmatians	1997	215,238	
Titanic	1998	1,590,451	
Journey to the Center of the Earth	2008	1,984,880	
Ice Age: Dawn of the Dinosaurs	2009	6,858,821	
Avatar	2010	18,537,471	
Avatar	2022	20,153,235	
Teambuilding	2022	23,554,124	
Avatar: The Way of Water	2023	38,557,592	
Avatar: The Way of Water	2025	39,042,404	

== Highest-grossing franchises and film series in Romania ==
This is the list of highest-grossing franchises and film series in Romania ranked in Romanian lei. Marvel Cinematic Universe is the highest-grossing franchise, with over 180 million lei. Avatar has the highest per-film average, with over 30 million lei. Fast & Furious, Marvel Cinematic Universe & Avatar are the only franchises with 3 films to have crossed the 10 million lei mark, while Jumanji, Spider-Man, Miami Bici, DC Extended Universe, Aquaman and Teambuilding have two films to have crossed the 10 million lei mark, Avatar is the only franchise with three films to have crossed the 20 million lei mark and two films to crossed the 30 million lei mark.

Background shading indicates that at least one film in the series is playing in the week commencing 13 November 2026 in Romanian theaters.

Rank	Series	Total box office (Lei)	No. of films	Average of films	Highest-grossing film

1
Marvel Cinematic Universe
213,735,234
38
5,624,611
Spider-Man: Brand New Day (20,691,016)

The Infinity Saga	109,926,082	23	4,779,395	Avengers: Endgame (16,058,241)
/ Phase Three / 77,371,533 / 11 / 7,033,776 / Avengers: Endgame (16,058,241); 1 / Avengers: Endgame (2019) / 16,058,241; 2 / Avengers: Infinity War (2018) / 9,992,353; 3 / Thor: Ragnarok (2017) / 8,112,273; 4 / Black Panther (2018) / 7,590,824; 5 / Captain Marvel (2019) / 7,182,977; 6 / Doctor Strange (2016) / 6,497,513; 7 / Spider-Man: Far From Home (2019) / 5,623,433; 8 / Guardians of the Galaxy Vol. 2 (2017) / 4,683,115; 9 / Captain America: Civil War (2016) / 4,671,515; 10 / Spider-Man: Homecoming (2017) / 4,065,175; 11 / Ant-Man and the Wasp (2018) / 2,894,114
/ Phase Two / 22,856,647 / 6 / 3,809,441 / Avengers: Age of Ultron (4,962,482); 1 / Avengers: Age of Ultron (2015) / 4,962,482; 2 / Thor: The Dark World (2013) / 4,847,616; 3 / Iron Man 3 (2013) / 4,048,668; 4 / Guardians of the Galaxy (2014) / 3,704,645; 5 / Captain America: The Winter Soldier (2014) / 2,906,748; 6 / Ant-Man (2015) / 2,386,488
/ Phase One / 9,697,902 / 6 / 1,616,317 / The Avengers (4,154,462); 1 / The Avengers (2012) / 4,154,462; 2 / Thor (2011) / 2,279,599; 3 / Iron Man 2 (2010) / 1,483,497; 4 / Captain America: The First Avenger (2011) / 866,602; 5 / Iron Man (2008) / 573,697; 6 / The Incredible Hulk (2008) / 340,045

The Multiverse Saga	103,821,337	15	6,921,422	Spider-Man: Brand New Day (20,691,016)
/ Phase Four / 46,315,864 / 7 / 6,616,552 / Spider-Man: No Way Home (13,610,424); 1 / Spider-Man: No Way Home (2021) / 13,610,424; 2 / Thor: Love and Thunder (2022) / 8,599,664; 3 / Doctor Strange in the Multiverse of Madness (2022) / 8,588,642; 4 / Black Panther: Wakanda Forever (2022) / 7,002,150; 5 / Shang-Chi and the Legend of the Ten Rings (2021) / 2,927,564; 6 / Black Widow (2021) / 2,870,739; 7 / Eternals (2021) / 2,716,681
/ Phase Five / 33,208,866 / 6 / 5,534,811 / Deadpool & Wolverine (15,504,433); 1 / Deadpool & Wolverine (2024) / 15,504,433; 2 / Captain America: Brave New World (2025) / 4,686,264; 3 / Guardians of the Galaxy Vol. 3 (2023) / 4,644,735; 4 / Ant-Man and the Wasp: Quantumania (2023) / 4,135,096; 5 / Thunderbolts* (2025) / 2,553,215; 6 / The Marvels (2023) / 1,685,123
/ Phase Six / 24,296,607 / 2 / 12,148,304 / Spider-Man: Brand New Day (20,691,016); 1 / Spider-Man: Brand New Day (2026) / 20,691,016; 2 / The Fantastic Four: First Steps (2025) / 3,605,591

2	Avatar	90,150,942	3	30,050,314	The Way of Water (39,042,404)
1	The Way of Water (2022)	39,042,404			
2	Fire and Ash (2025)	30,955,303			
3	Avatar (2009)	20,153,235			

3	Spider-Man	86,569,898	17	5,092,347	Brand New Day (20,691,016)
/ Marvel Cinematic Universe / 43,990,048 / 4 / 10,997,512 / Brand New Day (20,691,016); 1 / Brand New Day (2026) / 20,691,016; 2 / No Way Home (2021) / 13,610,424; 3 / Far From Home (2019) / 5,623,433; 4 / Homecoming (2017) / 4,065,175
/ Sony's Spider-Man Universe / 30,123,335 / 6 / 5,020,556 / Venom (10,029,468); 1 / Venom (2018) / 10,029,468; 2 / Venom: The Last Dance (2024) / 8,870,516; 3 / Venom: Let There Be Carnage (2021) / 3,715,784; 4 / Morbius (2022) / 3,301,623; 5 / Kraven the Hunter (2024) / 2,295,236; 6 / Madame Web (2024) / 1,910,708
/ Spider-Verse / 6,483,186 / 2 / 3,241,593 / Across the Spider-Verse (4,408,592); 1 / Across the Spider-Verse (2023) / 4,408,592; 2 / Into the Spider-Verse (2018) / 2,074,594
/ The Amazing Spider-Man series / 4,324,223 / 2 / 2,162,112 / The Amazing Spider-Man (2,221,620); 1 / The Amazing Spider-Man (2012) / 2,221,620; 2 / The Amazing Spider-Man 2 (2014) / 2,102,603
/ Raimi series / 1,649,106 / 3 / 549,702 / Spider-Man 2 (579,549); 1 / Spider-Man 2 (2004) / 579,549; 2 / Spider-Man (2002) / 555,803; 3 / Spider-Man 3 (2007) / 513,754

4	DC Extended Universe	71,120,667	14	5,080,048	Aquaman (15,722,391)
1	Aquaman (2018)	15,722,391			
2	Aquaman and the Lost Kingdom (2023)	10,291,249			
3	Suicide Squad (2016)	8,323,197			
4	Batman v Superman: Dawn of Justice (2016)	6,305,345			
5	Justice League (2017)	5,863,900			
6	Black Adam (2022)	5,657,152			
7	Wonder Woman (2017)	4,292,036			
8	Shazam! (2019)	3,275,894			
9	Man of Steel (2013)	2,683,621			
10	Birds of Prey (2020)	2,203,163			
11	The Suicide Squad (2021)	1,895,141			
12	The Flash (2023)	1,839,653			
13	Blue Beetle (2023)	1,424,383			
14	Shazam! Fury of the Gods (2023)	1,343,542			

5
Fast & Furious
64,257,348
11
5,841,577
The Fate of the Furious (13,316,052)

	The Fast Saga	54,454,236	10	5,445,424	The Fate of the Furious (13,316,052)
1	The Fate of the Furious (2017)	13,316,052			
2	Furious 7 (2015)	11,187,310			
3	Fast X (2023)	10,864,633			
4	F9 (2021)	9,119,763			
5	Fast & Furious 6 (2013)	4,400,415			
6	Fast Five (2011)	2,888,408			
7	Fast & Furious (2009)	1,398,286			
8	Tokyo Drift (2006)	515,267			
9	2 Fast 2 Furious (2003)	446,499			
10	The Fast and the Furious (2001)	317,603			

Hobbs & Shaw (2019)	9,803,112

6	X-Men	47,640,459	14	3,402,890	Deadpool & Wolverine (15,504,433)
/ Deadpool series / 29,116,833 / 3 / 9,705,611 / Deadpool & Wolverine (15,504,433); 1 / Deadpool & Wolverine (2024) / 15,504,433; 2 / Deadpool 2 (2018) / 7,075,184; 3 / Deadpool (2016) / 6,537,216
/ Main series / 10,332,523 / 7 / 1,476,075 / Apocalypse (3,311,123); 1 / Apocalypse (2016) / 3,311,808; 2 / Days of Future Past (2014) / 2,745,278; 3 / Dark Phoenix (2019) / 2,338,456; 4 / First Class (2011) / 957,656; 5 / The Last Stand (2006) / 407,300; 6 / X2 (2003) / 291,984; 7 / X-Men (2000) / 280,041
/ Wolverine series / 7,728,809 / 3 / 2,576,270 / Logan (4,539,986); 1 / Logan (2017) / 4,539,986; 2 / The Wolverine (2013) / 2,656,487; 3 / Origins: Wolverine (2009) / 532,336
The New Mutants (2020) / 462,294

7	Star Wars	44,187,746	13	3,399,057	The Force Awakens (13,515,925)
/ Skywalker saga / 33,107,667 / 9 / 3,678,630 / The Force Awakens (13,515,925); 1 / The Force Awakens (2015) / 13,515,925; 2 / The Last Jedi (2017) / 8,664,484; 3 / The Rise of Skywalker (2019) / 8,228,799; 4 / Revenge of the Sith (2005) / 1,103,843; 5 / The Phantom Menace (1999) / 709,205; 6 / Attack of the Clones (2002) / 702,527; 7 / A New Hope (1977)^{*} / 71,599; 8 / Return of the Jedi (1983) ^{*} (Note: Return of the Jedi: $73,414"Star Wars: Episode VI - Return of the Jedi (1983)". Box Office Mojo. = 56,757 RON "Historical Currency Converter by Date". fxtop.com. in 1997.) / 56,757; 9 / The Empire Strikes Back (1980)^{*} (Note: The Empire Strikes Back: $70,531 "Star Wars: Episode V - The Empire Strikes Back (1980)". Box Office Mojo. = 54,528 RON "Historical Currency Converter by Date". fxtop.com. in 1997.) / 54,528
/ Anthology films / 7,890,034 / 2 / 3,945,017 / Rogue One (5,665,732); 1 / Rogue One (2016) / 5,665,732; 2 / Solo (2018) / 2,224,302
The Mandalorian and Grogu (2026) / 3,129,493
The Clone Wars (2008) / 60,552

8
Despicable Me
39,096,309
7
5,585,187
Minions: The Rise of Gru (8,614,875)

	Minions series	22,206,423	3	7,402,141	The Rise of Gru (8,614,875)
1	The Rise of Gru (2022)	8,614,875			
2	Minions (2015)	8,148,891			
3	Minions & Monsters (2026)	5,442,657			

	Main series	16,889,886	4	4,222,472	Despicable Me 4 (8,323,736)
1	Despicable Me 4 (2024)	8,323,736			
2	Despicable Me 3 (2017)	5,113,509			
3	Despicable Me 2 (2013)	2,829,395			
4	Despicable Me (2010)	623,246			

9	Teambuilding	36,371,349	2	18,185,675	Teambuilding (23,576,362)
1	Teambuilding (2022)	23,576,362			
2	Teambuilding 2 (2026)	12,794,987			

10	Batman	35,340,293	10	3,534,029	Joker (11,126,579)
/ Joker series / 14,498,763 / 2 / 7,249,382 / Joker (11,126,579); 1 / Joker (2019) / 11,126,579; 2 / Folie à Deux (2024) / 3,372,184
The Batman (2022) / 6,452,847
Batman v Superman: Dawn of Justice (2016) / 6,305,345
/ The Dark Knight trilogy / 5,233,879 / 3 / 1,744,626 / The Dark Knight Rises (3,767,823); 1 / The Dark Knight Rises (2012) / 3,767,823; 2 / The Dark Knight (2008) / 1,163,389; 3 / Batman Begins (2005) / 302,667
The Lego Batman Movie (2016) / 1,524,516
Clayface (2026) / 1,288,332
Batman Forever (1995) / 36,611

11	Avengers	35,167,538	4	8,791,885	Endgame (16,058,241)
1	Endgame (2019)	16,058,241			
2	Infinity War (2018)	9,992,353			
3	Age of Ultron (2015)	4,962,482			
4	The Avengers (2012)	4,154,462			

12	The Conjuring Universe	31,037,125	9	3,448,569	The Conjuring: Last Rites (8,342,108)
/ Main series / 12,895,189 / 4 / 3,223,797 / Last Rites (8,342,108); 1 / Last Rites (2025) / 8,342,108; 2 / The Devil Made Me Do It (2021) / 2,282,417; 3 / The Conjuring 2 (2016) / 1,483,452; 4 / The Conjuring (2013) / 787,212
/ The Nun series / 11,890,909 / 2 / 5,945,455 / The Nun (6,078,556); 1 / The Nun (2018) / 6,078,556; 2 / The Nun II (2023) / 5,812,353
/ Annabelle series / 6,251,027 / 3 / 2,083,676 / Comes Home (2,960,348); 1 / Comes Home (2019) / 2,960,348; 2 / Creation (2017) / 2,087,911; 3 / Annabelle (2014) / 1,202,768

13	Sony's Spider-Man Universe	30,123,335	6	5,020,556	Venom (10,029,468)
1	Venom (2018)	10,029,468			
2	Venom: The Last Dance (2024)	8,870,516			
3	Venom: Let There Be Carnage (2021)	3,715,784			
4	Morbius (2022)	3,301,623			
5	Kraven the Hunter (2024)	2,295,236			
6	Madame Web (2024)	1,910,708			

14	Middle-earth	29,741,520	7	4,248,789	The Hobbit: The Battle of the Five Armies (10,858,515)
/ The Hobbit / 27,096,091 / 3 / 9,032,030 / The Battle of the Five Armies (10,858,515); 1 / The Battle of the Five Armies (2014) / 10,858,515; 2 / An Unexpected Journey (2012) / 8,278,047; 3 / The Desolation of Smaug (2013) / 7,959,529
/ The Lord of the Rings / 2,344,272 / 3 / 781,424 / The Return of the King (1,213,854); 1 / The Return of the King (2003) / 1,213,854; 2 / The Two Towers (2002) / 573,812; 3 / The Fellowship of the Ring (2001) / 556,606
The Lord of the Rings: The War of the Rohirrim (2024) / 301,157

15	Deadpool	29,116,833	3	9,705,611	Deadpool & Wolverine (15,504,433)
1	Deadpool & Wolverine (2024)	15,504,433			
2	Deadpool 2 (2018)	7,075,184			
3	Deadpool (2016)	6,537,216			

16	Miami Bici	26,717,644	2	13,358,822	Miami Bici 2 (15,059,007)
1	Miami Bici 2 (2023)	15,059,007			
2	Miami Bici (2020)	11,658,637			

17	Aquaman	26,013,640	2	13,006,820	Aquaman (15,722,391)
1	Aquaman (2018)	15,722,391			
2	Lost Kingdom (2023)	10,291,249			

18
Wizarding World
24,047,872
11
2,186,170
Fantastic Beasts: The Crimes of Grindelwald (5,211,371)

	Fantastic Beasts series	13,794,145	3	4,598,048	The Crimes of Grindelwald (5,211,371)
1	The Crimes of Grindelwald (2018)	5,211,371			
2	Fantastic Beasts and Where to Find Them (2016)	4,503,884			
3	The Secrets of Dumbledore (2022)	4,078,890			

	Harry Potter series	10,253,727	8	1,281,716	Deathly Hallows – Part 2 (2,942,110)
1	Deathly Hallows – Part 2 (2011)	2,942,110			
2	Deathly Hallows – Part 1 (2010)	2,009,278			
3	Half-Blood Prince (2009)	1,297,007			
4	Order of the Phoenix (2007)	780,072			
5	Prisoner of Azkaban (2004)	743,439			
6	Goblet of Fire (2005)	710,525			
7	Chamber of Secrets (2002)	679,790			
8	Minimaraton: Harry Potter and Philosopher's Stone + Chamber of Secrets (2026)	622,460			
9	Philosopher's Stone (2001)	469,046			

19	Thor	23,839,152	4	5,959,788	Love and Thunder (8,599,664)
1	Love and Thunder (2022)	8,599,664			
2	Ragnarok (2017)	8,112,273			
3	The Dark World (2013)	4,847,616			
4	Thor (2011)	2,279,599			

20
Wolverine
23,231,744
4
5,807,936
Deadpool & Wolverine (15,504,433)

Deadpool & Wolverine (2024)	15,504,433

	20th Century Fox series	7,728,809	3	2,576,270	Logan (4,539,986)
1	Logan (2017)	4,539,986			
2	The Wolverine (2013)	2,656,487			
3	Origins: Wolverine (2009)	532,336			

^{*}Gross from only the 1997 release.

== See also ==
- List of Romanian films
- Cinema of Romania
