= List of 2020 box office number-one films in Romania =

This is a list of films which have placed number one at the weekend box office in Romania during 2020.

== List ==
#	Weekend End Date	Film	Total Weekend Gross (Romanian leu)	Notes
1	January 5, 2020	5Gang: Another Kind of Christmas	868,327	
2	January 12, 2020	Like a Boss	636,611	
3	January 19, 2020	Bad Boys for Life	2,554,089	
4	January 26, 2020	Bad Boys for Life	1,911,395	
5	February 2, 2020	Bad Boys for Life	1,003,342	
6	February 9, 2020	Birds of Prey	786,885	
7	February 16, 2020	Bad Boys for Life	580,334	
8	February 23, 2020	Miami Bici	3,354,715	
9	March 1, 2020	Miami Bici	2,642,788	
10	March 8, 2020	Miami Bici	2,065,019	
11	March 15, 2020	Bloodshot	258,191	
12	March 22, 2020	—N/a	—N/a	^{Note}
13	March 29, 2020	—N/a	—N/a	^{Note}
14	April 5, 2020	—N/a	—N/a	^{Note}
15	April 12, 2020	—N/a	—N/a	^{Note}
16	April 19, 2020	—N/a	—N/a	^{Note}
17	April 26, 2020	—N/a	—N/a	^{Note}
18	May 3, 2020	—N/a	—N/a	^{Note}
19	May 10, 2020	—N/a	—N/a	^{Note}
20	May 17, 2020	—N/a	—N/a	^{Note}
21	May 24, 2020	—N/a	—N/a	^{Note}
22	May 31, 2020	—N/a	—N/a	^{Note}
23	June 7, 2020	—N/a	—N/a	^{Note}
24	June 14, 2020	—N/a	—N/a	^{Note}
25	June 21, 2020	—N/a	—N/a	^{Note}
26	June 28, 2020	10 Days Without Mum	315	^{Note}
27	July 5, 2020	Ivana the Terrible	732	^{Note}
28	July 12, 2020	—N/a	—N/a	^{Note}
29	July 19, 2020	10 Days Without Mum	135	^{Note}
30	July 26, 2020	Ivana the Terrible	912	^{Note}
31	August 2, 2020	Ivana the Terrible	48	^{Note}
32	August 9, 2020	Everything Will Not Be Fine	7,273	^{Note}
33	August 16, 2020	Ivana the Terrible	813	^{Note}
34	August 23, 2020	Uppercase Print	105	^{Note}
35	August 30, 2020	Ivana the Terrible	12	^{Note}
36	September 6, 2020	Bloodshot	7,805	^{Note}
37	September 13, 2020	After We Collided	371,743	
38	September 20, 2020	Tenet	554,279	
39	September 27, 2020	Mulan	338,688	
40	October 4, 2020	Mulan	218,983	
41	October 11, 2020	Honest Thief	191,387	
42	October 18, 2020	Trolls World Tour	206,859	
43	October 25, 2020	Trolls World Tour	53,784	
44	November 2, 2020	Honest Thief	42,148	
45	November 9, 2020	Honest Thief	15,921	
46	November 15, 2020	Trolls World Tour	1,437	^{Note}
47	November 22, 2020	5 Minutes Too Late	6,518	^{Note}
48	November 29, 2020	—N/a	—N/a	^{Note}
49	December 6, 2020	Honest Thief	767	^{Note}
50	December 13, 2020	Honest Thief	1,121	^{Note}
51	December 20, 2020	Trolls World Tour	2,612	^{Note}
52	December 27, 2020	The War with Grandpa	3,535	^{Note}

^{Note}During this weekends indoor cinemas were closed due to the COVID-19 pandemic

== Highest-grossing films ==
Highest-grossing films of 2020
Rank	Title	Distributor	Total gross
1	Miami Bici	Vertical Entertainment	11,603,217
2	Bad Boys for Life	InterComFilm Distribution	9,381,164
3	Dolittle	Ro Image 2000	2,781,265
4	1917	Vertical Entertainment	2,506,287
5	Knives Out	Vertical Entertainment	2,263,297
6	Birds of Prey	Vertical Entertainment	2,205,377
7	The Grudge	InterComFilm Distribution	2,060,483
8	The Gentlemen	Vertical Entertainment	1,944,579
9	Sonic the Hedgehog	Ro Image 2000	1,772,644
10	Tenet	Vertical Entertainment	1,599,411

Miami Bici became the 13th and first Romanian film to surpass the 10 million lei mark, and became the highest grossing Romanian film of all time.
