= Corporation (disambiguation) =

A corporation is a company or group of people authorized to act as a single entity (legal person) and recognized as such in law.

Corporation may also refer to:

== Education, establishments and organisations ==
- Harvard Corporation, AKA "the Corporation"
- Corporation (nightclub), nightclub in Sheffield, England
- The Corporation, Cardiff, public house in Wales
- "The Corporation", a press moniker for the Cuban-American criminal organization led by José Miguel Battle Sr.
- The Corporation (professional wrestling), late 1990s villainous stable in the World Wrestling Federation
- Yale Corporation, AKA "the Corporation"

== Film ==
- Corporation (TV series), 1975 Canadian television documentary series
- The Corporation (2003 film), 2003 Canadian documentary
- The Corporation (2012 film), Argentine film

== Literature ==
- Corporation (comics), fictional organization in the Marvel Universe
- The Corporation, fictional mercenary organization in Clive Cussler's Oregon Files novels

== Games ==
- Corporation (role playing game)
- Corporation (video game)

== Music ==
- The Corporation (record production team), group of American songwriters and record producers in the 1960s Motown label
- The Corporation (American band), an American, psychedelic rock band, active in the 1960s
- The Corporation (English band), English, all-star, pop group who released a single in 1988
- "Corporation" (song), a song by Jack White

== See also ==
- City of London Corporation, the municipal governing body of the City of London in England
- Corporate (disambiguation)
- Corporation (feudal Europe), an aggregation of business interests into a single legal body
- Corporation Bank, former state-owned banking company, India
- Corporation Building, Sydney, Australia
- Corporation Park, Blackburn, England
- Corporation Street, Birmingham, England
- Corporatism, the economic system
- The Corp or Students of Georgetown, Inc., student-owned non-profit organization at Georgetown University in Washington, D.C.
