= List of 2022 box office number-one films in Romania =

This is a list of films which have placed number one at the weekend box office in Romania during 2022.

== List ==
†	This implies the highest-grossing movie of the year.

#	Weekend End Date	Film	Total Weekend Gross (Romanian leu)	Notes
1	January 9, 2022	Spider-Man: No Way Home	1,008,086	
2	January 16, 2022	Spider-Man: No Way Home	683,403	
3	January 23, 2022	Spider-Man: No Way Home	439,715	
4	January 30, 2022	Spider-Man: No Way Home	300,593	
5	February 6, 2022	Moonfall	506,433	
6	February 13, 2022	Death on the Nile	741,924	
7	February 20, 2022	Uncharted	1,356,692	
8	February 27, 2022	Uncharted	836,151	
9	March 6, 2022	The Batman	1,715,477	
10	March 13, 2022	The Batman	1,253,787	
11	March 20, 2022	Turning Red	915,074	
12	March 27, 2022	The Lost City	1,076,351	
13	April 3, 2022	Morbius	1,211,730	
14	April 10, 2022	Fantastic Beasts: The Secrets of Dumbledore	1,111,973	
15	April 17, 2022	Fantastic Beasts: The Secrets of Dumbledore	672,868	
16	April 24, 2022	Chickenhare and the Hamster of Darkness	321,691	
17	May 1, 2022	The Northman	768,033	
18	May 8, 2022	Doctor Strange in the Multiverse of Madness	3,103,778	
19	May 15, 2022	Doctor Strange in the Multiverse of Madness	1,209,851	
20	May 22, 2022	Jujutsu Kaisen 0	839,986	
21	May 29, 2022	Top Gun: Maverick	1,606,768	
22	June 5, 2022	Top Gun: Maverick	929,421	
23	June 12, 2022	Jurassic World Dominion	1,700,385	
24	June 19, 2022	Jurassic World Dominion	620,854	
25	June 26, 2022	The Black Phone	400,959	
26	July 3, 2022	Minions: The Rise of Gru	1,565,467	
27	July 10, 2022	Thor: Love and Thunder	2,339,578	
28	July 17, 2022	Thor: Love and Thunder	958,518	
29	July 24, 2022	Thor: Love and Thunder	603,488	
30	July 31, 2022	DC League of Super-Pets	800,407	
31	August 7, 2022	Bullet Train	925,539	
32	August 14, 2022	Bullet Train	601,602	
33	August 21, 2022	Where the Crawdads Sing	503,688	
34	August 28, 2022	After Ever Happy	664,600	
35	September 4, 2022	Bullet Train	283,564	
36	September 11, 2022	Bullet Train	284,985	
37	September 18, 2022	Ticket to Paradise	871,925	
38	September 25, 2022	Avatar (reissue)	667,112	
39	October 2, 2022	Teambuilding	4,914,907	
40	October 9, 2022	Teambuilding	2,507,890	
41	October 16, 2022	Teambuilding	1,854,980	
42	October 23, 2022	Black Adam	1,667,508	
43	October 30, 2022	Teambuilding	974,819	
44	November 6, 2022	Teambuilding	782,370	
45	November 13, 2022	Black Panther: Wakanda Forever	2,174,324	
46	November 20, 2022	Black Panther: Wakanda Forever	1,341,778	In its 8th weekend, Teambuilding became the highest-grossing film at the time
47	November 27, 2022	Black Panther: Wakanda Forever	700,895	
48	December 4, 2022	Violent Night	653,422	
49	December 11, 2022	Puss in Boots: The Last Wish	1,471,222	
50	December 18, 2022	Avatar: The Way of Water †	6,305,847	5th highest weekend gross of all time.
51	December 25, 2022	Avatar: The Way of Water †	1,749,584	
52	January 1, 2023	Avatar: The Way of Water †	2,118,035	

== Highest-grossing films ==
Highest-grossing films of 2022
Rank	Title	Distributor	Total gross
1	Avatar: The Way of Water	Forum Film Romania	39,042,404
2	Teambuilding	Vidra Productions	23,576,362
3	Top Gun: Maverick	Ro Image 2000	9,611,194
4	Minions: The Rise of Gru	Ro Image 2000	8,614,875
5	Thor: Love and Thunder	Forum Film Romania	8,599,664
6	Doctor Strange in the Multiverse of Madness	Forum Film Romania	8,588,642
7	Mirciulica	Bravo Films	8,219,341
8	Puss in Boots: The Last Wish	Ro Image 2000	7,481,831
9	Black Panther: Wakanda Forever	Forum Film Romania	7,000,005
10	The Batman	Vertical Entertainment	6,452,847

Teambuilding became the 15th film and 2nd romanian film to pass the 10 million lei mark, 2nd film and 1st romanian film to pass the 20 million lei mark. Avatar: The Way of Water became the 16th film to pass the 10 million lei mark, and 3rd film to pass the 20 million lei mark. Both movies were the first to sell over 1 million tickets since 1998's Titanic.
