= List of 2019 box office number-one films in Romania =

This is a list of films which have placed number one at the weekend box office in Romania during 2019.

#	Weekend End Date	Film	Total Weekend Gross (Romanian leu)	Notes
1	January 6, 2019	Aquaman	1,489,836	
2	January 13, 2019	Aquaman	986,865	
3	January 20, 2019	Glass	879,259	
4	January 27, 2019	A Dog's Way Home	602,305	
5	February 3, 2019	How to Train Your Dragon: The Hidden World	755,047	
6	February 10, 2019	How to Train Your Dragon: The Hidden World	696,087	
7	February 17, 2019	Oh, Ramona!	2,209,669	
8	February 24, 2019	Oh, Ramona!	860,144	
9	March 3, 2019	What Men Want	676,236	
10	March 10, 2019	Captain Marvel	2,398,712	
11	March 17, 2019	Captain Marvel	1,318,218	
12	March 24, 2019	Captain Marvel	622,148	
13	March 31, 2019	Dumbo	792,527	
14	April 7, 2019	Shazam!	983,881	
15	April 14, 2019	Shazam!	624,672	
16	April 21, 2019	After	914,179	
17	April 28, 2019	Avengers: Endgame	3,855,954	
18	May 5, 2019	Avengers: Endgame	2,292,510	
19	May 12, 2019	Avengers: Endgame	1,124,132	
20	May 19, 2019	John Wick: Chapter 3 - Parabellum	1,266,425	
21	May 26, 2019	Aladdin	1,092,881	
22	June 2, 2019	Aladdin	1,194,273	
23	June 9, 2019	Pokémon Detective Pikachu	855,227	
24	June 16, 2019	The Secret Life of Pets 2	501,302	
25	June 23, 2019	Men in Black: International	902,771	
26	June 30, 2019	Men in Black: International	354,751	
27	July 7, 2019	Spider-Man: Far From Home	1,756,121	
28	July 14, 2019	Annabelle Comes Home	915,498	
29	July 21, 2019	The Lion King	1,731,192	
30	July 28, 2019	The Lion King	1,023,218	
31	August 4, 2019	Hobbs & Shaw	2,860,832	
32	August 11, 2019	Hobbs & Shaw	1,117,119	
33	August 18, 2019	Once Upon a Time in Hollywood	905,709	
34	August 25, 2019	Once Upon a Time in Hollywood	513,343	
35	September 1, 2019	Angel Has Fallen	764,717	
36	September 8, 2019	It Chapter Two	1,113,384	
37	September 15, 2019	It Chapter Two	597,402	
38	September 22, 2019	Ad Astra	664,014	
39	September 29, 2019	Hustlers	747,889	
40	October 6, 2019	Joker	2,110,334	
41	October 13, 2019	Joker	1,757,742	
42	October 20, 2019	Maleficent: Mistress of Evil	1,770,607	
43	October 27, 2019	Maleficent: Mistress of Evil	1,106,496	
44	November 3, 2019	Terminator: Dark Fate	923,241	
45	November 10, 2019	Maleficent: Mistress of Evil	574,603	
46	November 17, 2019	Ford v Ferrari	640,993	
47	November 24, 2019	Frozen II	3,782,858	
48	December 1, 2019	Frozen II	2,471,702	
49	December 8, 2019	Jumanji: The Next Level	2,208,805	
50	December 15, 2019	Jumanji: The Next Level	1,508,116	
51	December 22, 2019	Star Wars: The Rise of Skywalker	2,940,578	
52	December 29, 2019	5GANG: Another Kind of Christmas	2,821,396	

== Highest-grossing films ==
Highest-grossing films of 2019
Rank	Title	Distributor	Total gross
1	Avengers: Endgame	Forum Film Romania	16,058,241
2	Frozen II	Forum Film Romania	13,453,922
3	Joker	Vertical Entertainment	11,126,579
4	Jumanji: The Next Level	InterComFilm Distribution	10,574,332
5	Hobbs & Shaw	Ro Image 2000	9,803,112
6	Star Wars: The Rise of Skywalker	Forum Film Romania	8,228,799
7	The Lion King	Forum Film Romania	8,199,103
8	Captain Marvel	Forum Film Romania	7,182,977
9	Maleficent: Mistress of Evil	Forum Film Romania	6,775,189
10	5Gang: A Different Kind of Christmas	Vertical Entertainment	6,488,206

Avengers: Endgame, Joker, Frozen II & Jumanji: The Next Level became the 9th, 10th, 11th & 12th films respectively to surpass the 10 million lei mark, the latter being the first animated film to surpass that mark. The Lion King became the highest-grossing animated film in Romania at the time, before it was surpassed by Frozen II later in the year, becoming the highest-grossing animated film at the. 5Gang: A Different Kind of Christmas became the highest grossing romanian film at the time.

== Notes ==
- In its 11th weekend, Moromete Family: On the Edge of Time became the highest-grossing Romanian film at the time. In its 3rd weekend, Oh, Ramona! became the highest-grossing Romanian film at the time.
