= Corporate (disambiguation) =

A corporation is a type of legal entity, often formed to conduct business.

Corporate may also refer to:

- Corporate (2006 film), an Indian Hindi-language drama
- Corporate (2017 film), a French thriller
- Corporate (2026 film), a Ukrainian comedy
- Corporate (TV series), a 2018–2020 American sitcom
- Corporate.com, a defunct website maintained by Graphiq

== See also ==
- Corporation (disambiguation)
