= List of 2024 box office number-one films in Romania =

This is a list of films which have placed number one at the weekend box office in Romania during 2024.

== List ==
†	This implies the highest-grossing movie of the year.

#	Weekend End Date	Film	Total Weekend Gross (Romanian leu)	Notes
1	January 7, 2024	Part-Time Dads	4,220,824	
2	January 14, 2024	Part-Time Dads	1,507,666	
3	January 21, 2024	Klaus & Barroso	1,231,956	
4	January 28, 2024	Part-Time Dads	683,790	
5	February 4, 2024	Argylle	619,567	
6	February 11, 2024	Poor Things	563,140	
7	February 18, 2024	Madame Web	808,355	
8	February 25, 2024	Baghead	516,494	
9	March 3, 2024	Dune: Part Two	3,096,978	
10	March 10, 2024	Dune: Part Two	1,822,074	
11	March 17, 2024	Kung Fu Panda 4	1,726,415	
12	March 24, 2024	Kung Fu Panda 4	832,254	
13	March 31, 2024	Godzilla x Kong: The New Empire	1,233,295	
14	April 7, 2024	Godzilla x Kong: The New Empire	623,344	
15	April 14, 2024	Ghostbusters: Frozen Empire	318,598	
16	April 21, 2024	Nasty	399,747	
17	April 28, 2024	Buzz House: The Movie	7,211,155	2nd highest weekend gross of all time
18	May 5, 2024	Buzz House: The Movie	510,923	
19	May 12, 2024	Kingdom of the Planet of the Apes	1,193,910	
20	May 19, 2024	The Garfield Movie	1,540,131	
21	May 26, 2024	Furiosa: A Mad Max Saga	628,481	
22	June 2, 2024	The Garfield Movie	781,438	
23	June 9, 2024	Bad Boys: Ride or Die	1,405,552	
24	June 16, 2024	Inside Out 2	2,023,506	
25	June 23, 2024	Inside Out 2	1,220,130	
26	June 30, 2024	Inside Out 2	834,486	
27	July 7, 2024	Despicable Me 4	1,499,871	
28	July 14, 2024	Despicable Me 4	730,406	
29	July 21, 2024	Despicable Me 4	662,683	
30	July 28, 2024	Deadpool & Wolverine †	3,679,086	
31	August 4, 2024	Deadpool & Wolverine †	1,885,048	
32	August 11, 2024	It Ends with Us	1,211,011	
33	August 18, 2024	Alien: Romulus	888,699	
34	August 25, 2024	Deadpool & Wolverine †	547,945	
35	September 1, 2024	Deadpool & Wolverine †	379,212	
36	September 8, 2024	Beetlejuice Beetlejuice	504,551	
37	September 15, 2024	Beetlejuice Beetlejuice	511,507	
38	September 22, 2024	Transformers One	419,756	
39	September 29, 2024	The New Year That Never Came	545,051	
40	October 6, 2024	Joker: Folie à Deux	1,788,448	
41	October 13, 2024	Joker: Folie à Deux	479,199	
42	October 20, 2024	Smile 2	751,081	
43	October 27, 2024	Venom: The Last Dance	2,871,755	
44	November 3, 2024	Death on Vacation	2,569,605	
45	November 10, 2024	Death on Vacation	1,519,556	
46	November 17, 2024	Gladiator II	3,042,845	
47	November 24, 2024	Gladiator II	1,470,002	
48	December 1, 2024	Moana 2	2,690,680	
49	December 8, 2024	The Marriage	2,258,503	
50	December 15, 2024	The Marriage	828,756	
51	December 22, 2024	Mufasa: The Lion King	1,191,308	
52	December 29, 2024	Sonic the Hedgehog 3	2,506,650	

== Highest-grossing films ==
Highest-grossing films of 2024
Rank	Title	Distributor	Total gross
1	Deadpool & Wolverine	Forum Film Romania	15,504,433
2	Inside Out 2	Forum Film Romania	14,040,853
3	Buzz House: The Movie	Vidra Productions	13,271,140
4	Dune: Part Two	Vertical Entertainment	11,540,336
5	Part-Time Dads	Vidra Productions	10,892,992
6	The Marriage	Vertical Entertainment	9,429,082
7	Moana 2	Forum Film Romania	9,365,663
8	Gladiator II	Ro Image 2000	9,111,072
9	Venom: The Last Dance	InterComFilm Distribution	8.870,516
10	Death on Vacation	Bravo Films	8,669,846

In its 14th week, Inside Out 2 became the highest grossing animated film in Romania at the time.

== See also ==
- List of 2025 box office number-one films in Romania
