= List of 2025 box office number-one films in Romania =

This is a list of films which have placed number one at the weekend box office in Romania during 2025.

== List ==
†	This implies the highest-grossing movie of the year.

#	Weekend End Date	Film	Total Weekend Gross (Romanian leu)	Notes
1	January 5, 2025	Nosferatu	1,712,362	
2	January 12, 2025	Nosferatu	1,105,189	
3	January 19, 2025	Paddington in Peru	1,113,367	
4	January 26, 2025	Paddington in Peru	577,839	
5	February 2, 2025	Tandari	528,496	
6	February 9, 2025	A Complete Unknown	329,600	
7	February 16, 2025	Captain America: Brave New World	1,809,374	
8	February 23, 2025	Captain America: Brave New World	817,474	
9	March 2, 2025	The Mentors	1,501,913	
10	March 9, 2025	The Mentors	521,470	
11	March 16, 2025	The Mentors	457,455	
12	March 23, 2025	Snow White	859,663	
13	March 30, 2025	A Working Man	743,758	
14	April 6, 2025	A Minecraft Movie	3,890,977	
15	April 13, 2025	A Minecraft Movie	2,202,476	
16	April 20, 2025	Buzz House: The Movie 2	3,549,270	
17	April 27, 2025	Buzz House: The Movie 2	1,023,090	
18	May 4, 2025	Thunderbolts*	823,686	
19	May 11, 2025	The Mermaids: The Secret of the Medallion	862,330	
20	May 18, 2025	Final Destination Bloodlines	999,103	
21	May 25, 2025	Lilo & Stitch	2,936,583	
22	June 1, 2025	Lilo & Stitch	2,012,365	
23	June 8, 2025	Lilo & Stitch	622,168	
24	June 15, 2025	How to Train Your Dragon	1,104,306	
25	June 22, 2025	The Mermaids 2: Mystery Island	551,159	
26	June 29, 2025	F1	1,974,020	
27	July 6, 2025	Jurassic World Rebirth	1,082,525	
28	July 13, 2025	Superman	981,556	
29	July 20, 2025	Superman	590,416	
30	July 27, 2025	The Fantastic Four: First Steps	1,144,410	
31	August 3, 2025	The Bad Guys 2	525,910	
32	August 10, 2025	The Bad Guys 2	333,847	
33	August 17, 2025	Materialists	460,089	
34	August 24, 2025	Materialists	303,260	
35	August 31, 2025	Smurfs	548,070	
36	September 7, 2025	The Conjuring: Last Rites	3,258,039	
37	September 14, 2025	The Conjuring: Last Rites	1,181,038	
38	September 21, 2025	Situationship: Combinations, Not Relationships	829,697	
39	September 28, 2025	One Battle After Another	566,199	
40	October 5, 2025	The Neighbor	3,464,274	
41	October 12, 2025	The Neighbor	1,714,998	
42	October 19, 2025	The Neighbor	1,181,065	
43	October 26, 2025	The Race	3,573,090	
44	November 2, 2025	The Race	899,680	
45	November 9, 2025	Predator: Badlands	1,060,733	
46	November 16, 2025	The Yellow Tie	1,973,490	
47	November 23, 2025	The Yellow Tie	1,869,300	
48	November 30, 2025	Zootopia 2	2,655,960	
49	December 7, 2025	Five Nights at Freddy's 2	1,829,508	
50	December 14, 2025	Zootopia 2	993,881	
51	December 21, 2025	Avatar: Fire and Ash	5,683,454	8th highest weekend gross of all time
52	December 28, 2025	Avatar: Fire and Ash	5,955,597	6th highest weekend gross of all time

== Highest-grossing films ==
Highest-grossing films of 2025
Rank	Title	Distributor	Total gross
1	Avatar: Fire and Ash	Forum Film Romania	30,955,303
2	The Yellow Tie	Vertical Entertainment	15,522,067
3	Zootopia 2	Forum Film Romania	14,720,492
4	A Minecraft Movie	Vertical Entertainment	13,312,346
5	The Neighbor	Bravo Films	11,421,966
6	Lilo & Stitch	Forum Film Romania	10,893,474
7	F1	Vertical Entertainment	9,168,520
8	The Conjuring: Last Rites	Vertical Entertainment	8,342,108
9	The Race	Vertical Entertainment	8,242,648
10	Buzz House: The Movie 2	Vidra Distribution	7,968,316

In its 13th week, Zootopia 2 became the highest grossing animated film in Romania.
