= List of 2016 box office number-one films in Romania =

This is a list of films which have placed number one at the weekend box office in Romania during 2016.

== Number-one films ==
†	This implies the highest-grossing movie of the year.

#	Weekend End Date	Film	Total Weekend Gross (Romanian leu)	Notes
1	January 3, 2016	Point Break	1.502.326,00	
2	January 10, 2016	Daddy's Home	781.861,37	
3	January 17, 2016	Ride Along 2	1.044.708,61	
4	January 24, 2016	The Revenant	1.136.572,00	
5	January 31, 2016	Fifty Shades of Black	564.795,63	
6	February 7, 2016	Dirty Grandpa	1.461.392,96	
7	February 14, 2016	Deadpool	2.223.167,00	
8	February 21, 2016	Deadpool	1.086.328,00	
9	February 28, 2016	Gods of Egypt	1.557.185,84	
10	March 6, 2016	Zootopia	771.201,00	
11	March 13, 2016	Zootopia	935.528,00	
12	March 20, 2016	London Has Fallen	1.118.667,81	
13	March 27, 2016	Batman v Superman: Dawn of Justice	2.760.640,24	
14	April 3, 2016	Batman v Superman: Dawn of Justice	864.313,89	
15	April 10, 2016	Batman v Superman: Dawn of Justice	479.753,77	
16	April 17, 2016	The Jungle Book	1.528.641,00	
17	April 24, 2016	The Jungle Book	1.020.751,00	
18	May 1, 2016	The Jungle Book	283.197,00	
19	May 8, 2016	Captain America: Civil War	1.951.360,00	
20	May 15, 2016	Captain America: Civil War	897.090,00	
21	May 22, 2016	X-Men: Apocalypse	966.928,00	
22	May 29, 2016	X-Men: Apocalypse	451.304,28	
23	June 5, 2016	Teenage Mutant Ninja Turtles: Out of the Shadows	386.912,22	
24	June 12, 2016	Warcraft	2.398.348,65	
25	June 19, 2016	Now You See Me 2	1.029.253,37	
26	June 26, 2016	Independence Day: Resurgence	775.430,00	
27	July 3, 2016	Central Intelligence	502.500,72	
28	July 10, 2016	The Legend of Tarzan	866.631,01	
29	July 17, 2016	Ice Age: Collision Course	1.407.743,00	
30	July 24, 2016	Star Trek Beyond	549.974,92	
31	July 31, 2016	Jason Bourne	547.560,47	
32	August 7, 2016	Suicide Squad †	2.093.606,48	
33	August 14, 2016	Suicide Squad †	1.156.778,96	
34	August 21, 2016	Suicide Squad †	531.192,71	
35	August 28, 2016	Mechanic: Resurrection	826.189,49	
36	September 4, 2016	Mechanic: Resurrection	401.781,50	
37	September 11, 2016	Sully	383.322,28	
38	September 18, 2016	Nerve	502.223,16	
39	September 25, 2016	Storks	488.800,32	
40	October 2, 2016	Miss Peregrine's Home for Peculiar Children	603.259,00	
41	October 9, 2016	The Girl on the Train	518.091,14	
42	October 16, 2016	Inferno	1.203.895,00	
43	October 23, 2016	Jack Reacher: Never Go Back	980.691,23	
44	October 30, 2016	The Accountant	710.669,12	
45	November 6, 2016	Doctor Strange	2.000.481,00	
46	November 13, 2016	Doctor Strange	1.212.163,00	
47	November 20, 2016	Fantastic Beasts and Where to Find Them	1.467.132,56	
48	November 27, 2016	Fantastic Beasts and Where to Find Them	751.511,05	
49	December 4, 2016	Underworld: Blood Wars	908.558,00	
50	December 11, 2016	Office Christmas Party	756.445,44	
51	December 18, 2016	Rogue One: A Star Wars Story	1.902.369,00	
52	December 25, 2016	Passengers	563.402,00	
53	January 1, 2017	The Great Wall	929.382,44	

== Highest-grossing films ==
Highest-grossing films of 2016
Rank	Title	Distributor	Total gross
1	Suicide Squad	Freeman Entertainment	8,323,197
2	The Jungle Book	Forum Film Romania	7,187,836
3	Deadpool	Odeon Cineplex	6,537,216
4	Doctor Strange	Forum Film Romania	6,497,513
5	Batman v Superman: Dawn of Justice	Freeman Entertainment	6,305,345
6	Dirty Grandpa	Freeman Entertainment	5,674,883
7	Rogue One: A Star Wars Story	Forum Film Romania	5,665,732
8	Zootopia	Forum Film Romania	5,190,703
9	Why Him?	Odeon Cineplex	4,998,379
10	Trolls	Odeon Cineplex	4,881,634

== See also ==
- List of highest-grossing films in Romania
- List of Romanian films

== Notes ==
- In its third weekend, Selfie 69 became the highest-grossing Romanian film of all time.
