= List of 2014 box office number-one films in Romania =

This is a list of films which have placed number one at the weekend box office in Romania during 2014.

== Number-one films ==
†	This implies the highest-grossing movie of the year.

#	Weekend End Date	Film	Total Weekend Gross (Romanian leu)	Notes
1	January 5, 2014	Frozen	539.955,00	
2	January 12, 2014	The Wolf of Wall Street	1.770.935,42	
3	January 19, 2014	The Wolf of Wall Street	1.074.017,40	
4	January 26, 2014	I, Frankenstein	372.363,00	
5	February 2, 2014	The Legend of Hercules	868.528,45	
6	February 9, 2014	The Legend of Hercules	474.806,40	
7	February 16, 2014	Winter's Tale	542.864,96	
8	February 23, 2014	Pompeii	1.169.557,09	
9	March 2, 2014	Pompeii	679.461,36	
10	March 9, 2014	300: Rise of an Empire	2.237.780,39	Highest weekend gross at the time.
11	March 16, 2014	300: Rise of an Empire	1.042.238,78	
12	March 23, 2014	Need for Speed	491.919,20	
13	March 30, 2014	Noah	1.312.138,58	
14	April 6, 2014	Captain America: The Winter Soldier	790.548,00	
15	April 13, 2014	Rio 2	663.600,00	
16	April 20, 2014	Rio 2	172.525,00	
17	April 27, 2014	Transcendence	774.328,96	
18	May 4, 2014	The Amazing Spider-Man 2	855.007,00	
19	May 11, 2014	The Amazing Spider-Man 2	463.784,00	
20	May 18, 2014	Godzilla	1.436.104,63	
21	May 25, 2014	X-Men: Days of Future Past	788.258,00	
22	June 1, 2014	Maleficent	1.176.864,00	
23	June 8, 2014	Edge of Tomorrow	861.393,09	
24	June 15, 2014	22 Jump Street	425.995,00	
25	June 22, 2014	How to Train Your Dragon 2	652.311,00	
26	June 29, 2014	Transformers: Age of Extinction	1.026.248,43	
27	July 6, 2014	Transformers: Age of Extinction	415.733,95	
28	July 13, 2014	Dawn of the Planet of the Apes	641.664,00	
29	July 20, 2014	Sex Tape	502.804,00	
30	July 27, 2014	Hercules	739.549,00	
31	August 3, 2014	Lucy	805.586,76	
32	August 10, 2014	Guardians of the Galaxy	757.619,00	
33	August 17, 2014	Guardians of the Galaxy	471.898,00	
34	August 24, 2014	Teenage Mutant Ninja Turtles	423.706,00	
35	August 31, 2014	The Expendables 3	325.912,59	
36	September 7, 2014	The Giver	190.180,91	
37	September 14, 2014	Into the Storm	225.763,70	
38	September 21, 2014	The Maze Runner	704.066,00	
39	September 28, 2014	The Equalizer	569.281,00	
40	October 5, 2014	Dracula Untold	1.087.530,02	
41	October 12, 2014	Dracula Untold	517.945,35	
42	October 19, 2014	Dracula Untold	415.041,40	
43	October 26, 2014	Fury	557.021,06	
44	November 2, 2014	John Wick	630.198,00	
45	November 9, 2014	Interstellar	1.148.649,08	
46	November 16, 2014	Interstellar	931.967,09	
47	November 23, 2014	The Hunger Games: Mockingjay – Part 1	1.197.955,00	
48	November 30, 2014	Penguins of Madagascar	1.089.733,00	
49	December 7, 2014	Penguins of Madagascar	480.192,00	
50	December 14, 2014	Exodus: Gods and Kings	670.136,00	
51	December 21, 2014	The Hobbit: The Battle of the Five Armies †	3.137.138,00	Highest weekend gross at the time.
52	December 28, 2014	The Hobbit: The Battle of the Five Armies †	2.443.730,00	

== Highest-grossing films ==
Highest-grossing films of 2014
Rank	Title	Distributor	Total gross
1	The Hobbit: The Battle of the Five Armies	Forum Film Romania	10,858,515
2	Interstellar	Freeman Entertainment	6,390,326
3	300: Rise of an Empire	MediaPro Distribution	5,538,340
4	The Wolf of Wall Street	MediaPro Distribution	5,353,093
5	Noah	Ro Image 2000	4,543,946
6	Penguins of Madagascar	Odeon Cineplex	4,045,878
7	Lucy	Ro Image 2000	3,934,745
8	Dracula Untold	Ro Image 2000	3,730,341
9	Guardians of the Galaxy	Forum Film Romania	3,704,646
10	Maleficent	Forum Film Romania	3,575,496

The Hobbit: The Battle of the Five Armies became the 2nd film to surpass the 10 million lei mark.

== See also ==
- List of Romanian films
- List of highest-grossing films in Romania
