= List of 2023 box office number-one films in Romania =

This is a list of films which have placed number one at the weekend box office in Romania during 2023.

== List ==
| † | This implies the highest-grossing movie of the year. |

| # | Weekend End Date | Film | Total Weekend Gross (Romanian leu) | Notes |
|---|---|---|---|---|
| 1 | January 8, 2023 | Romina, VTM | 6,553,905 | 4th highest weekend gross of all time In its 4th weekend, Avatar: The Way of Water became the highest-grossing film of all time |
| 2 | January 15, 2023 | Avatar: The Way of Water | 2,100,670 | |
| 3 | January 22, 2023 | Avatar: The Way of Water | 1,468,990 | |
| 4 | January 29, 2023 | Plane | 817,877 | |
| 5 | February 5, 2023 | Ramon | 1,123,215 | |
| 6 | February 12, 2023 | Ramon | 700,089 | |
| 7 | February 19, 2023 | Ant-Man and the Wasp: Quantumania | 1,340,371 | |
| 8 | February 26, 2023 | Ant-Man and the Wasp: Quantumania | 720,699 | |
| 9 | March 5, 2023 | Creed III | 1,058,969 | |
| 10 | March 12, 2023 | Creed III | 689,589 | |
| 11 | March 19, 2023 | Shazam! Fury of the Gods | 523,623 | |
| 12 | March 26, 2023 | Action Pack | 3,118,617 | |
| 13 | April 2, 2023 | John Wick: Chapter 4 | 3,098,695 | |
| 14 | April 9, 2023 | The Super Mario Bros. Movie | 1,198,080 | |
| 15 | April 16, 2023 | The Super Mario Bros. Movie | 321,847 | |
| 16 | April 23, 2023 | Evil Dead Rise | 704,369 | |
| 17 | April 30, 2023 | The Super Mario Bros. Movie | 340,796 | |
| 18 | May 7, 2023 | Guardians of the Galaxy Vol. 3 | 1,439,487 | |
| 19 | May 14, 2023 | Guardians of the Galaxy Vol. 3 | 967,877 | |
| 20 | May 21, 2023 | Fast X | 3,870,109 | |
| 21 | May 28, 2023 | Fast X | 1,598,480 | |
| 22 | June 4, 2023 | Spider-Man: Across the Spider-Verse | 1,312,838 | |
| 23 | June 11, 2023 | Transformers: Rise of the Beasts | 995,692 | |
| 24 | June 18, 2023 | Elemental | 722,310 | |
| 25 | June 25, 2023 | Elemental | 373,650 | |
| 26 | July 2, 2023 | Indiana Jones and the Dial of Destiny | 666,160 | |
| 27 | July 9, 2023 | Insidious: The Red Door | 701,635 | |
| 28 | July 16, 2023 | Mission: Impossible – Dead Reckoning Part One | 1,430,619 | |
| 29 | July 23, 2023 | Barbie | 2,957,025 | |
| 30 | July 30, 2023 | Barbie | 1,660,714 | |
| 31 | August 6, 2023 | Meg 2: The Trench | 1,102,297 | |
| 32 | August 13, 2023 | Gran Turismo | 593,557 | |
| 33 | August 20, 2023 | Oppenheimer | 402,841 | |
| 34 | August 27, 2023 | Retribution | 419,612 | |
| 35 | September 3, 2023 | The Equalizer 3 | 859,545 | |
| 36 | September 10, 2023 | The Nun II | 1,831,699 | |
| 37 | September 17, 2023 | The Nun II | 1,059,478 | |
| 38 | September 24, 2023 | Expend4bles | 681,235 | |
| 39 | October 1, 2023 | PAW Patrol: The Mighty Movie | 734,741 | |
| 40 | October 8, 2023 | The Exorcist: Believer | 518,702 | |
| 41 | October 15, 2023 | Money Wedding | 2,904,480 | |
| 42 | October 22, 2023 | Money Wedding | 1,245,523 | |
| 43 | October 29, 2023 | Five Nights at Freddy's | 2,716,129 | |
| 44 | November 5, 2023 | Five Nights at Freddy's | 601,745 | |
| 45 | November 12, 2023 | The Marvels | 798,067 | |
| 46 | November 19, 2023 | The Hunger Games: The Ballad of Songbirds & Snakes | 1,284,316 | |
| 47 | November 26, 2023 | Miami Bici 2 † | 5,281,140 | 10th highest weekend gross of all time |
| 48 | December 3, 2023 | Miami Bici 2 † | 2,164,899 | |
| 49 | December 10, 2023 | Miami Bici 2 † | 979,774 | |
| 50 | December 17, 2023 | Wonka | 648,865 | |
| 51 | December 24, 2023 | Aquaman and the Lost Kingdom | 1,097,062 | |
| 52 | December 31, 2023 | Aquaman and the Lost Kingdom | 925,552 | |

== Highest-grossing films ==
Highest-grossing films of 2023
| Rank | Title | Distributor | Total gross |
|---|---|---|---|
| 1 | Miami Bici 2 | Vertical Entertainment | 15,059,007 |
| 2 | Barbie | Vertical Entertainment | 13,839,596 |
| 3 | Oppenheimer | Ro Image 2000 | 12,174,632 |
| 4 | Fast X | Ro Image 2000 | 10,864,633 |
| 5 | Aquaman and the Lost Kingdom | Vertical Entertainment | 10,291,249 |
| 6 | Romina, VTM | Vidra Productions | 9,499,089 |
| 7 | Money Wedding | Bravo Films | 9,157,979 |
| 8 | Action Pack | Vidra Productions | 7,901,750 |
| 9 | John Wick: Chapter 4 | Vertical Entertainment | 6,507,254 |
| 10 | The Super Mario Bros. Movie | Ro Image 2000 | 5,848,898 |

== See also ==
- 2023 in Romania
