= List of 2010 box office number-one films in Romania =

This is a list of films which have placed number one at the weekend box office in Romania during 2010.

== Number-one films ==
†	This implies the highest-grossing movie of the year.

#	Weekend End Date	Film	Total Weekend Gross (Romanian lei)	Notes
1	January 3, 2010	Avatar	1.201.868,00	
2	January 10, 2010	Avatar	1.251.557,00	In its 4th weekend, Avatar became the highest-grossing film at the time.
3	January 17, 2010	Avatar	1.159.125,00	
4	January 24, 2010	Avatar	921.055,00	
5	January 31, 2010	Avatar	848.898,00	
6	February 7, 2010	Avatar	647.323,00	
7	February 14, 2010	Avatar	608.555,00	
8	February 21, 2010	Avatar	451.185,00	
9	February 28, 2010	Shutter Island	386.904,10	
10	March 7, 2010	Alice in Wonderland †	919.581,00	
11	March 14, 2010	Alice in Wonderland †	828.968,00	
12	March 21, 2010	Alice in Wonderland †	449.669,00	
13	March 28, 2010	The Bounty Hunter	363.181,00	
14	April 4, 2010	The Bounty Hunter	143.708,00	
15	April 11, 2010	Alice in Wonderland †	171.124,00	
16	April 18, 2010	Clash of the Titans	925.681,00	
17	April 25, 2010	Clash of the Titans	608.796,00	
18	May 2, 2010	Iron Man 2	364.102,22	
19	May 9, 2010	Iron Man 2	256.978,30	
20	May 16, 2010	Robin Hood	650.849,74	
21	May 23, 2010	Robin Hood	344.840,80	
22	May 30, 2010	Prince of Persia: The Sands of Time	619.258,00	
23	June 6, 2010	Sex and the City 2	456.719,00	
24	June 13, 2010	Sex and the City 2	232.771,00	
25	June 20, 2010	Sex and the City 2	164.462,00	
26	June 27, 2010	The A-Team	188.942,00	
27	July 4, 2010	The Twilight Saga: Eclipse	821.733,21	
28	July 11, 2010	The Twilight Saga: Eclipse	250.546,10	
29	July 18, 2010	Shrek Forever After	1.075.765,89	
30	July 25, 2010	Knight and Day	362.276,00	
31	August 1, 2010	Inception	657.337,00	
32	August 8, 2010	Inception	361.435,00	
33	August 15, 2010	Inception	266.542,00	
34	August 22, 2010	Inception	204.408,00	
35	August 29, 2010	Grown Ups	257.561,00	
36	September 5, 2010	Step Up 3D	400.086,20	
37	September 12, 2010	Step Up 3D	274.351,90	
38	September 19, 2010	Resident Evil: Afterlife	426.095,00	
39	September 26, 2010	Resident Evil: Afterlife	311.790,00	
40	October 3, 2010	Piranha 3D	341.390,20	
41	October 10, 2010	Legend of the Guardians: The Owls of Ga'Hoole	248.527,00	
42	October 17, 2010	Eat Pray Love	369.874,00	
43	October 24, 2010	Eat Pray Love	272.187,00	
44	October 31, 2010	Saw 3D	373.288,00	
45	November 7, 2010	Due Date	449.282,00	
46	November 14, 2010	Due Date	346.767,00	
47	November 21, 2010	Due Date	261.256,00	
48	November 28, 2010	Harry Potter and the Deathly Hallows – Part 1	712.976,00	
49	December 5, 2010	Harry Potter and the Deathly Hallows – Part 1	383.192,00	
50	December 12, 2010	The Chronicles of Narnia: The Voyage of the Dawn Treader	462.568,70	
51	December 19, 2010	Tron: Legacy	531.881,00	
52	December 26, 2010	Little Fockers	432.138,14	

== Highest-grossing films ==
Highest-grossing films of 2010
Rank	Title	Distributor	Total gross
1	Alice in Wonderland	Forum Film Romania	4,572,425
2	Inception	InterComFilm Distribution	3,801,450
3	Shrek Forever After	Ro Image 2000	3,287,160
4	Clash of the Titans	InterComFilm Distribution	3,143,747
5	Prince of Persia: The Sands of Time	Forum Film Romania	2,796,094
6	Tron: Legacy	Forum Film Romania	2,739,447
7	Sherlock Holmes	InterComFilm Distribution	2,529,885
8	Little Fockers	Ro Image 2000	2,365,886
9	Step Up 3D	MediaPro Distribution	2,351,142
10	Robin Hood	Ro Image 2000	2,251,098

== See also ==
- List of Romanian films
- List of highest-grossing films in Romania
