= List of 2009 box office number-one films in Romania =

This is a list of films which have placed number one at the weekend box office in Romania during 2009.

== Number-one films ==
†	This implies the highest-grossing movie of the year.

#	Weekend End Date	Film	Total Weekend Gross (Romanian leu)	Notes
1	January 4, 2009	Bolt	180.510,00	
2	January 11, 2009	Yes Man	272.261,00	
3	January 18, 2009	Yes Man	256.476,00	
4	January 25, 2009	Yes Man	197.768,00	
5	February 1, 2009	Valkyrie	150.863,00	
6	February 8, 2009	Underworld: Rise of the Lycans	121.078,00	
7	February 15, 2009	My Bloody Valentine 3D	381.747,80	
8	February 22, 2009	My Bloody Valentine 3D	222.501,40	
9	March 1, 2009	My Bloody Valentine 3D	135.031,90	
10	March 8, 2009	Watchmen	180.489,80	
11	March 15, 2009	Slumdog Millionaire	175.711,70	
12	March 22, 2009	Marley & Me	160.857,00	
13	March 29, 2009	The International	146.017,00	
14	April 5, 2009	Fast and Furious	446.536,10	
15	April 12, 2009	Fast and Furious	214.641,40	
16	April 19, 2009	Paul Blart: Mall Cop	49.216,00	
17	April 26, 2009	Crank: High Voltage	251.249,85	
18	May 3, 2009	X-Men Origins: Wolverine	201.215,00	
19	May 10, 2009	Duplicity	165.846,35	
20	May 17, 2009	Angels & Demons	407.517,00	
21	May 24, 2009	Angels & Demons	228.590,00	
22	May 31, 2009	Angels & Demons	178.412,00	
23	June 7, 2009	Terminator Salvation	312.797,00	
24	June 14, 2009	Up	210.297,00	
25	June 21, 2009	The Hangover	137.658,00	
26	June 28, 2009	Transformers: Revenge of the Fallen	375.720,61	
27	July 5, 2009	Ice Age: Dawn of the Dinosaurs	1.425.865,00	In its 1st weekend, Ice Age became the highest weekend gross at the time and the highest-grossing animated film at the time.
28	July 12, 2009	Ice Age: Dawn of the Dinosaurs	932.355,00	
29	July 19, 2009	Ice Age: Dawn of the Dinosaurs	455.921,00	
30	July 26, 2009	Harry Potter and the Half-Blood Prince	457.432,00	
31	August 2, 2009	Harry Potter and the Half-Blood Prince	210.952,00	
32	August 9, 2009	The Taking of Pelham 123	177.368,00	
33	August 16, 2009	The Proposal	436.212,00	
34	August 23, 2009	The Proposal	160.653,00	
35	August 30, 2009	G.I. Joe: The Rise of Cobra	217.245,25	
36	September 6, 2009	Inglourious Basterds	373.279,77	
37	September 13, 2009	The Ugly Truth	336.166,00	
38	September 20, 2009	The Final Destination	501.622,00	
39	September 27, 2009	The Final Destination	404.931,00	
40	October 4, 2009	The Final Destination	221.872,00	
41	October 11, 2009	The Rebound	220.287,30	
42	October 18, 2009	The Rebound	177.589,10	
43	October 25, 2009	Surrogates	228.628,00	
44	November 1, 2009	Michael Jackson's This Is It	715.297,00	
45	November 8, 2009	A Christmas Carol	348.115,00	
46	November 15, 2009	2012	1.001.118,00	
47	November 22, 2009	2012	1.021.440,00	
48	November 29, 2009	The Twilight Saga: New Moon	894.525,20	
49	December 6, 2009	Couples Retreat	389.961,70	
50	December 13, 2009	Law Abiding Citizen	219.115,80	
51	December 20, 2009	Avatar †	1.531.237,00	Highest weekend gross at the time.
52	December 27, 2009	Avatar †	1.420.788,00	

== Highest-grossing films ==
Highest-grossing films of 2009
Rank	Title	Distributor	Total gross
1	Avatar	Odeon Cineplex	20,153,235
2	Ice Age: Dawn of the Dinosaurs	Odeon Cineplex	6,876,618
3	2012	InterComFilm Distribution	4,844,214
4	The Final Destination	InterComFilm Distribution	2,408,652
5	The Twilight Saga: New Moon	MediaPro Distribution	2,161,686
6	A Christmas Carol	Audio Visual Romania	1,993,499
7	Michael Jackson's This Is It	InterComFilm Distribution	1,851,826
8	The Proposal	Audio Visual Romania	1,786,460
9	My Bloody Valentine 3D	MediaPro Distribution	1,731,137
10	Inglourious Basterds	Ro Image 2000	1,654,476

== See also ==
- List of Romanian films
- List of highest-grossing films in Romania

== Notes ==
- In its 4th weekend, Ice Age surpassed Titanic to become the highest-grossing film of all time until it was surpassed latter by Avatar.
