= List of 2015 box office number-one films in Romania =

This is a list of films which have placed number one at the weekend box office in Romania during 2015.

#	Weekend End Date	Film	Total Weekend Gross (Romanian lei)	Notes
1	January 4, 2015	Seventh Son	1,300,954	
2	January 11, 2015	Taken 3	1,514,314	
3	January 18, 2015	Taken 3	778,780	
4	January 25, 2015	Big Hero 6	916,211	
5	February 1, 2015	The Wedding Ringer	464,444	
6	February 8, 2015	Jupiter Ascending	1,048,326	
7	February 15, 2015	Fifty Shades of Grey	2,769,610	
8	February 22, 2015	Fifty Shades of Grey	838,124	
9	March 1, 2015	Focus	890,844	
10	March 8, 2015	Focus	631,916	
11	March 15, 2015	Cinderella	665,130	
12	March 22, 2015	The Divergent Series: Insurgent	1,005,600	
13	March 29, 2015	Get Hard	655,264	
14	April 5, 2015	Furious 7	3,648,242	Highest weekend gross at the time.
15	April 12, 2015	Furious 7	739,378	
16	April 19, 2015	Furious 7	990,603	
17	April 26, 2015	Avengers: Age of Ultron	1,561,645	
18	May 3, 2015	Avengers: Age of Ultron	984,281	
19	May 10, 2015	Avengers: Age of Ultron	449,012	
20	May 17, 2015	Mad Max: Fury Road	1,120,331	
21	May 24, 2015	Mad Max: Fury Road	511,893	
22	May 31, 2015	San Andreas	710,099	
23	June 7, 2015	San Andreas	368,172	
24	June 14, 2015	Jurassic World	1,072,739	
25	June 21, 2015	Jurassic World	886,708	
26	June 28, 2015	Ted 2	718,211	
27	July 5, 2015	Terminator Genisys	817,821	
28	July 12, 2015	Minions	2,117,614	
29	July 19, 2015	Minions	830,458	
30	July 26, 2015	Minions	476,072	
31	August 2, 2015	Mission: Impossible – Rogue Nation	832,923	
32	August 9, 2015	Mission: Impossible – Rogue Nation	389,593	
33	August 16, 2015	Mission: Impossible – Rogue Nation	301,500	
34	August 23, 2015	The Man from U.N.C.L.E.	610,102	
35	August 30, 2015	Hitman: Agent 47	460,389	
36	September 6, 2015	The Transporter Refueled	550,364	
37	September 13, 2015	Maze Runner: The Scorch Trials	837,176	
38	September 20, 2015	Everest	796,804	
39	September 27, 2015	Everest	581,272	
40	October 4, 2015	The Martian	1,306,045	
41	October 11, 2015	The Martian	628,735	
42	October 18, 2015	Legend	562,773	
43	October 25, 2015	The Last Witch Hunter	897,222	
44	November 1, 2015	Hotel Transylvania 2	1,504,675	
45	November 8, 2015	Spectre	2,052,353	
46	November 15, 2015	Spectre	1,213,614	
47	November 22, 2015	The Hunger Games: Mockingjay – Part 2	1,698,625	
48	November 29, 2015	The Hunger Games: Mockingjay – Part 2	696,897	
49	December 6, 2015	In the Heart of the Sea	573,992	
50	December 13, 2015	The Night Before	408,151	
51	December 20, 2015	Star Wars: The Force Awakens	3,975,328	Highest weekend gross at the time, now the 10th highest weekend gross of all time.
52	December 27, 2015	Star Wars: The Force Awakens	2,092,889	

== Highest-grossing films ==
Highest-grossing films of 2015
Rank	Title	Distributor	Total gross
1	Star Wars: The Force Awakens	Forum Film Romania	13,515,925
2	Furious 7	Ro Image 2000	11,187,310
3	Minions	Ro Image 2000	8,148,891
4	Spectre	Forum Film Romania	6,291,782
5	Fifty Shades of Grey	Ro Image 2000	5,731,176
6	Avengers: Age of Ultron	Forum Film Romania	4,962,482
7	Jurassic World	Ro Image 2000	4,925,154
8	The Martian	Odeon Cineplex	4,603,092
9	Hotel Transylvania 2	InterComFilm Distribution	4,346,508
10	The Hunger Games: Mockingjay – Part 2	Forum Film Romania	4,203,033

Furious 7 and Star Wars: The Force Awakens became the 3rd and 4th film to surpass the 10 million lei mark, also 2015 is the first year in which two movies have surpassed that mark. Minions became the highest-grossing animated film in Romania at the time.

== See also ==
- List of highest-grossing films in Romania
- List of Romanian films
