= List of 2012 box office number-one films in Romania =

This is a list of films which have placed number one at the weekend box office in Romania during 2012.

== Number-one films ==
†	This implies the highest-grossing movie of the year.

#	Weekend End Date	Film	Total Weekend Gross (Romanian leu)	Notes
1	January 1, 2012	Sherlock Holmes: A Game of Shadows	235.075,30	
2	January 8, 2012	Happy Feet Two	640.439,80	
3	January 15, 2012	Jack and Jill	527.084,00	
4	January 22, 2012	Underworld: Awakening	504.542,00	
5	January 29, 2012	Underworld: Awakening	402.428,00	
6	February 5, 2012	Haywire	195.913,10	
7	February 12, 2012	Journey 2: The Mysterious Island	537.112,72	
8	February 19, 2012	This Means War	379.146,00	
9	February 26, 2012	Ghost Rider: Spirit of Vengeance	590.192,88	
10	March 4, 2012	Ghost Rider: Spirit of Vengeance	232.080,90	
11	March 11, 2012	John Carter	582.930,00	
12	March 18, 2012	John Carter	374.527,00	
13	March 25, 2012	The Hunger Games	417.996,00	
14	April 1, 2012	Wrath of the Titans	844.513,60	
15	April 8, 2012	American Reunion	652.540,00	
16	April 15, 2012	American Reunion	188.497,90	
17	April 22, 2012	Battleship	505.378,18	
18	April 29, 2012	American Reunion	136.624,40	
19	May 6, 2012	The Avengers	1.039.341,00	
20	May 13, 2012	The Avengers	707.702,00	
21	May 20, 2012	The Dictator	703.797,78	
22	May 27, 2012	Men in Black 3	950.052,00	
23	June 3, 2012	Men in Black 3	506.321,00	
24	June 10, 2012	Prometheus	708.613,00	
25	June 17, 2012	Madagascar 3: Europe's Most Wanted	902.357,90	
26	June 24, 2012	Madagascar 3: Europe's Most Wanted	456.962,50	
27	July 1, 2012	Madagascar 3: Europe's Most Wanted	252.131,30	
28	July 8, 2012	Ice Age: Continental Drift	1.156.662,00	
29	July 15, 2012	Ice Age: Continental Drift	728.241,00	
30	July 22, 2012	Ice Age: Continental Drift	542.690,00	
31	July 29, 2012	The Dark Knight Rises	1.019.751,65	
32	August 5, 2012	The Dark Knight Rises	414.570,55	
33	August 12, 2012	Total Recall	501.554,00	
34	August 19, 2012	Brave	916.925,00	
35	August 26, 2012	Brave	324.097,00	
36	September 2, 2012	The Expendables 2	486.660,60	
37	September 9, 2012	Step Up Revolution	340.937,62	
38	September 16, 2012	Resident Evil: Retribution	533.597,00	
39	September 23, 2012	Resident Evil: Retribution	258.237,00	
40	September 30, 2012	Premium Rush	203.286,00	
41	October 7, 2012	Looper	289.533,80	
42	October 14, 2012	Taken 2	974.647,40	
43	October 21, 2012	Hotel Transylvania	601.223,00	
44	October 28, 2012	Skyfall	1.401.951,00	
45	November 4, 2012	Skyfall	911.409,00	
46	November 11, 2012	Skyfall	556.605,00	
47	November 18, 2012	The Twilight Saga: Breaking Dawn - Part 2	2.154.867,30	Highest weekend gross at the time.
48	November 25, 2012	The Twilight Saga: Breaking Dawn - Part 2	696.093,60	
49	December 2, 2012	Rise of the Guardians	469.767,90	
50	December 9, 2012	Playing for Keeps	259.098,38	
51	December 16, 2012	The Hobbit: An Unexpected Journey †	1.876.802,00	
52	December 23, 2012	The Hobbit: An Unexpected Journey †	896.695,00	
53	December 30, 2012	The Hobbit: An Unexpected Journey †	852.971,00	

== Highest-grossing films ==
Highest-grossing films of 2012
Rank	Title	Distributor	Total gross
1	The Hobbit: An Unexpected Journey	Forum Film Romania	8,278,047
2	Ice Age: Continental Drift	Odeon Cineplex	7,036,356
3	Skyfall	Forum Film Romania	5,433,566
4	The Twilight Saga: Breaking Dawn – Part 2	MediaPro Distribution	4,870,931
5	The Avengers	Forum Film Romania	4,154,462
6	Life of Pi	Odeon Cineplex	3,996,482
7	The Dark Knight Rises	MediaPro Distribution	3,767,823
8	Madagascar 3: Europe's Most Wanted	Ro Image 2000	3,624,302
9	Brave	Forum Film Romania	3,191,120
10	Men in Black 3	InterComFilm Distribution	2,998,047

== See also ==
- List of Romanian films
- List of highest-grossing films in Romania
