= List of 2017 box office number-one films in Romania =

This is a list of films which have placed number one at the weekend box office in Romania during 2017.

#	Weekend End Date	Film	Total Weekend Gross (Romanian leu)	Notes
1	January 8, 2017	Assassin's Creed	2,134,852	
2	January 15, 2017	Assassin's Creed	1,074,435	
3	January 22, 2017	xXx: Return of Xander Cage	1,848,089	
4	January 29, 2017	xXx: Return of Xander Cage	832,667	
5	February 5, 2017	Resident Evil: The Final Chapter	702,342	
6	February 12, 2017	Fifty Shades Darker	2,932,281	
7	February 19, 2017	John Wick: Chapter 2	1,322,475	
8	February 26, 2017	Fist Fight	679.326	
9	March 5, 2017	Logan	1,471,426	
10	March 12, 2017	Kong: Skull Island	1,680,930	
11	March 19, 2017	Beauty and the Beast	2,197,886	
12	March 26, 2017	Beauty and the Beast	1,167,930	
13	April 2, 2017	Smurfs: The Lost Village	1,008,794	
14	April 9, 2017	Smurfs: The Lost Village	545,494	
15	April 16, 2017	The Boss Baby	548,561	
16	April 23, 2017	The Fate of the Furious	7,443,186	Highest weekend gross of all time.
17	April 30, 2017	The Fate of the Furious	1,592,056	
18	May 7, 2017	Guardians of the Galaxy Vol. 2	1,817,891	
19	May 14, 2017	Guardians of the Galaxy Vol. 2	821,777	
20	May 21, 2017	King Arthur: Legend of the Sword	1,516,400	
21	May 28, 2017	Pirates of the Caribbean: Dead Men Tell No Tales	3,040,811	
22	June 4, 2017	Wonder Woman	1,035,973	
23	June 11, 2017	Wonder Woman	649,265	
24	June 18, 2017	Cars 3	963,740	
25	June 25, 2017	Transformers: The Last Knight	1,021,711	
26	July 2, 2017	Despicable Me 3	988,581	
27	July 9, 2017	Spider-Man: Homecoming	1,130,724	
28	July 16, 2017	War for the Planet of the Apes	1,143,133	
29	July 23, 2017	Dunkirk	655,474	
30	July 30, 2017	Dunkirk	405,325	
31	August 6, 2017	The Dark Tower	625,674	
32	August 13, 2017	The Emoji Movie	588,529	
33	August 20, 2017	Annabelle: Creation	639,480	
34	August 27, 2017	American Made	659,862	
35	September 3, 2017	The Hitman's Bodyguard	755,181	
36	September 10, 2017	It	628,166	
37	September 17, 2017	It	407,830	
38	September 24, 2017	Kingsman: The Golden Circle	840,155	
39	October 1, 2017	Kingsman: The Golden Circle	421,174	
40	October 8, 2017	Blade Runner 2049	1,219,097	
41	October 15, 2017	Blade Runner 2049	770,348	
42	October 22, 2017	Geostorm	1,401,714	
43	October 29, 2017	Thor: Ragnarok	2,348,180	
44	November 5, 2017	Thor: Ragnarok	1,418,094	
45	November 12, 2017	Daddy's Home 2	910,671	
46	November 19, 2017	Justice League	2,334,597	
47	November 26, 2017	Murder on the Orient Express	1,125,237	
48	December 3, 2017	Murder on the Orient Express	839,199	
49	December 10, 2017	Murder on the Orient Express	436,812	
50	December 17, 2017	Star Wars: The Last Jedi	3,013,871	
51	December 24, 2017	Star Wars: The Last Jedi	785,564	
52	December 31, 2017	Jumanji: Welcome to the Jungle	2,130,370	

== Highest-grossing films ==
Highest-grossing films of 2017
Rank	Title	Distributor	Total gross
1	The Fate of the Furious	Ro Image 2000	13,316,052
2	Jumanji: Welcome to the Jungle	InterComFilm Distribution	11,093,679
3	Pirates of the Caribbean: Dead Men Tell No Tales	Forum Film Romania	9,159,517
4	Star Wars: The Last Jedi	Forum Film Romania	8,664,484
5	Thor: Ragnarok	Forum Film Romania	8,112.273
6	Fifty Shades Darker	Ro Image 2000	6,987,350
7	Beauty and the Beast	Forum Film Romania	6,455,767
8	Assassin's Creed	Odeon Cineplex	5,921,682
9	Justice League	Vertical Entertainment	5,863,900
10	The Boss Baby	Odeon Cineplex	5,264,392

The Fate of the Furious and Jumanji: Welcome to the Jungle are the 5th & 6th film respectively to surpass the 10 million lei mark.

== See also ==
- List of highest-grossing films in Romania
- List of Romanian films
