= List of 2011 box office number-one films in Romania =

This is a list of films which have placed number one at the weekend box office in Romania during 2011.

== Number-one films ==
| † | This implies the highest-grossing movie of the year. |

| # | Weekend End Date | Film | Total Weekend Gross (Romanian leu) | Notes |
|---|---|---|---|---|
| 1 | January 2, 2011 | Little Fockers | 262.658,90 | |
| 2 | January 9, 2011 | Tangled | 813.343,00 | |
| 3 | January 16, 2011 | Tangled | 675.386,00 | |
| 4 | January 23, 2011 | Tangled | 349.921,00 | |
| 5 | January 30, 2011 | The Green Hornet | 345.447,00 | |
| 6 | February 6, 2011 | The Green Hornet | 209.477,00 | |
| 7 | February 13, 2011 | No Strings Attached | 502.237,21 | |
| 8 | February 20, 2011 | Unknown | 300.162,30 | |
| 9 | February 28, 2011 | Drive Angry | 335.260,80 | |
| 10 | March 6, 2011 | Rango | 251.277,28 | |
| 11 | March 13, 2011 | The Rite | 251.543,20 | |
| 12 | March 20, 2011 | Just Go with It | 422.816,00 | |
| 13 | March 27, 2011 | Just Go with It | 247.289,00 | |
| 14 | April 3, 2011 | Battle: Los Angeles | 180.313,00 | |
| 15 | April 10, 2011 | Red Riding Hood | 150.441,90 | |
| 16 | April 17, 2011 | Rio | 481.459,70 | |
| 17 | April 24, 2011 | Rio | 126.057,51 | |
| 18 | May 1, 2011 | Fast Five | 635.082,89 | |
| 19 | May 8, 2011 | Thor | 1.043.821,41 | |
| 20 | May 15, 2011 | Priest | 454.912,00 | |
| 21 | May 22, 2011 | Pirates of the Caribbean: On Stranger Tides † | 1.755.443,00 | Highest weekend gross at the time. |
| 22 | May 29, 2011 | Pirates of the Caribbean: On Stranger Tides † | 845.351,00 | |
| 23 | June 5, 2011 | The Hangover Part II | 849.405,46 | |
| 24 | June 12, 2011 | Kung Fu Panda 2 | 721.203,76 | |
| 25 | June 19, 2011 | Kung Fu Panda 2 | 240.627,60 | |
| 26 | June 26, 2011 | Mr. Popper's Penguins | 286.038,00 | |
| 27 | July 3, 2011 | Transformers: Dark of the Moon | 1.320.505,98 | |
| 28 | July 10, 2011 | Transformers: Dark of the Moon | 339.508,60 | |
| 29 | July 17, 2011 | Harry Potter and the Deathly Hallows – Part 2 | 925.837,26 | |
| 30 | July 24, 2011 | Harry Potter and the Deathly Hallows – Part 2 | 379.362,10 | |
| 31 | July 31, 2011 | Green Lantern | 248.267,56 | |
| 32 | August 7, 2011 | Cars 2 | 325.654,00 | |
| 33 | August 14, 2011 | Horrible Bosses | 367.841,66 | |
| 34 | August 21, 2011 | Conan the Barbarian | 288.561,42 | |
| 35 | August 28, 2011 | The Smurfs | 406.725,00 | |
| 36 | September 4, 2011 | Final Destination 5 | 427.820,03 | |
| 37 | September 11, 2011 | Friends with Benefits | 240.074,00 | |
| 38 | September 18, 2011 | Crazy, Stupid, Love | 304.637,90 | |
| 39 | September 25, 2011 | Johnny English Reborn | 387.305,84 | |
| 40 | October 2, 2011 | Johnny English Reborn | 245.181,40 | |
| 41 | October 9, 2011 | The Killer Elite | 297.947,17 | |
| 42 | October 16, 2011 | The Three Musketeers | 855.230,40 | |
| 43 | October 23, 2011 | The Three Musketeers | 557.962,10 | |
| 44 | October 30, 2011 | In Time | 421.276,00 | |
| 45 | November 6, 2011 | In Time | 318.117,00 | |
| 46 | November 13, 2011 | Immortals | 1.021.508,30 | |
| 47 | November 20, 2011 | The Twilight Saga: Breaking Dawn - Part 1 | 1.387.067,50 | |
| 48 | November 27, 2011 | The Twilight Saga: Breaking Dawn - Part 1 | 487.915,10 | |
| 49 | December 4, 2011 | Puss in Boots | 1.267.520,74 | |
| 50 | December 11, 2011 | Puss in Boots | 553.320,20 | |
| 51 | December 18, 2011 | Mission: Impossible – Ghost Protocol | 690.444,70 | |
| 52 | December 25, 2011 | Sherlock Holmes: A Game of Shadows | 422.256,70 | |

== Highest-grossing films ==
Highest-grossing films of 2011
| Rank | Title | Distributor | Total gross |
|---|---|---|---|
| 1 | Pirates of the Caribbean: On Stranger Tides | Forum Film Romania | 6,723,370 |
| 2 | Puss in Boots | Ro Image 2000 | 4,431,098 |
| 3 | Immortals | MediaPro Distribution | 3,766,453 |
| 4 | Tangled | Forum Film Romania | 3,666,505 |
| 5 | Sherlock Holmes: A Game of Shadows | MediaPro Distribution | 3,579,843 |
| 6 | Transformers: Dark of the Moon | Ro Image 2000 | 3,503,145 |
| 7 | The Twilight Saga: Breaking Dawn – Part 1 | MediaPro Distribution | 3,374,509 |
| 8 | The Hangover Part II | MediaPro Distribution | 3,272,992 |
| 9 | The Three Musketeers | MediaPro Distribution | 3,247,324 |
| 10 | Harry Potter and the Deathly Hallows – Part 2 | MediaPro Distribution | 2,942,110 |

== See also ==
- List of Romanian films
- List of highest-grossing films in Romania
