= List of 2013 box office number-one films in Romania =

This is a list of films which have placed number one at the weekend box office in Romania during 2013.

== Number-one films ==
†	This implies the highest-grossing movie of the year.

#	Weekend End Date	Film	Total Weekend Gross (Romanian leu)	Notes
1	January 6, 2013	The Hobbit: An Unexpected Journey	539.955,00	
2	January 13, 2013	Gangster Squad	554.249,00	
3	January 20, 2013	Django Unchained	642.517,00	
4	January 27, 2013	Django Unchained	326.428,00	
5	February 3, 2013	Hansel & Gretel: Witch Hunters	469.334,27	
6	February 10, 2013	Broken City	388.977,47	
7	February 17, 2013	A Good Day to Die Hard	631.808,00	
8	February 24, 2013	Flight	313.116,71	
9	March 3, 2013	Parker	441.712,22	
10	March 10, 2013	Oz the Great and Powerful	793.084,00	
11	March 17, 2013	Oz the Great and Powerful	616.837,00	
12	March 24, 2013	The Croods	637.691,00	
13	March 31, 2013	G.I. Joe: Retaliation	741.958,64	
14	April 7, 2013	Olympus Has Fallen	647.585,28	
15	April 14, 2013	Oblivion	714.217,71	
16	April 21, 2013	Oblivion	276.719,90	
17	April 28, 2013	Iron Man 3	1.039.339,00	
18	May 5, 2013	Iron Man 3	277.594,00	
19	May 12, 2013	Iron Man 3	389.458,00	
20	May 19, 2013	The Great Gatsby	848.658,60	
21	May 26, 2013	Fast & Furious 6	1.541.426,77	
22	June 2, 2013	The Hangover Part III	1.269.651,33	
23	June 9, 2013	Epic	606.573,00	
24	June 16, 2013	Now You See Me	881.493,24	
25	June 23, 2013	Man of Steel	916.206,52	
26	June 30, 2013	World War Z	419.587,50	
27	July 7, 2013	Despicable Me 2	573.657,79	
28	July 14, 2013	Pacific Rim	620.474,15	
29	July 21, 2013	White House Down	285.551,00	
30	July 28, 2013	The Wolverine	285.551,00	
31	August 4, 2013	Red 2	372.656,75	
32	August 11, 2013	The Conjuring	205.550,66	
33	August 18, 2013	Elysium	719.100,00	
34	August 25, 2013	The Smurfs 2	617.102,00	
35	September 1, 2013	We're the Millers	793.166,51	
36	September 8, 2013	We're the Millers	393.503,35	
37	September 15, 2013	Riddick	608.751,67	
38	September 22, 2013	Paranoia	282.381,63	
39	September 29, 2013	Runner Runner	489.384,00	
40	October 6, 2013	Gravity	697.411,20	
41	October 13, 2013	Gravity	525.835,15	
42	October 20, 2013	Gravity	406.515,80	
43	October 27, 2013	Escape Plan	377.471,04	
44	November 3, 2013	Ender's Game	484.190,23	
45	November 10, 2013	Thor: The Dark World	1.323.171,00	
46	November 17, 2013	Thor: The Dark World	922.012,00	
47	November 24, 2013	The Hunger Games: Catching Fire	974.587,00	
48	December 1, 2013	The Hunger Games: Catching Fire	457.388,00	
49	December 8, 2013	Homefront	547.806,44	
50	December 15, 2013	The Hobbit: The Desolation of Smaug †	2.139.062,00	
51	December 22, 2013	The Hobbit: The Desolation of Smaug †	1.115.857,00	
52	December 29, 2013	Frozen	1.387.994,00	

== Highest-grossing films ==
Highest-grossing films of 2013
Rank	Title	Distributor	Total gross
1	The Hobbit: The Desolation of Smaug	Forum Film Romania	7,959,528
2	Frozen	Forum Film Romania	5,369,078
3	Thor: The Dark World	Forum Film Romania	4,847,615
4	Fast & Furious 6	Ro Image 2000	4,400,415
5	Iron Man 3	Forum Film Romania	4,048,668
6	Now You See Me	MediaPro Distribution	3,698,750
7	Gravity	MediaPro Distribution	3,672,978
8	Last Vegas	MediaPro Distribution	3,591,566
9	The Great Gatsby	MediaPro Distribution	3,329,865
10	We're the Millers	MediaPro Distribution	3,288,539

== See also ==
- List of Romanian films
- List of highest-grossing films in Romania

== Notes ==
- In its 4th weekend Child's Pose became the highest-grossing Romanian film at the time.
