= List of 2018 box office number-one films in Romania =

This is a list of films which have placed number one at the weekend box office in Romania during 2018.

== Number-one films ==
†	This implies the highest-grossing movie of the year.

#	Weekend End Date	Film	Total Weekend Gross (Romanian leu)	Notes
1	January 7, 2018	Jumanji: Welcome to the Jungle	2,000,229	
2	January 14, 2018	Jumanji: Welcome to the Jungle	1,103,829	
3	January 21, 2018	Den of Thieves	845,378	
4	January 28, 2018	Maze Runner: The Death Cure	1,262,003	
5	February 4, 2018	Maze Runner: The Death Cure	621,510	
6	February 11, 2018	Fifty Shades Freed	3,009,841	
7	February 18, 2018	Black Panther	2,109,114	
8	February 25, 2018	Black Panther	1,436,604	
9	March 4, 2018	Red Sparrow	829,049	
10	March 11, 2018	Red Sparrow	470,176	
11	March 18, 2018	Tomb Raider	1,149,674	
12	March 25, 2018	Pacific Rim Uprising	811,778	
13	April 1, 2018	Peter Rabbit	1,006,486	
14	April 8, 2018	Peter Rabbit	293,987	
15	April 15, 2018	Rampage	886,116	
16	April 22, 2018	Rampage	460,939	
17	April 29, 2018	Avengers: Infinity War	3,162,752	
18	May 6, 2018	Avengers: Infinity War	1,517,803	
19	May 13, 2018	Avengers: Infinity War	913,778	
20	May 20, 2018	Deadpool 2	2,535,239	
21	May 27, 2018	Deadpool 2	847,376	
22	June 3, 2018	Deadpool 2	560,567	
23	June 10, 2018	Jurassic World: Fallen Kingdom	1,301,491	
24	June 17, 2018	Jurassic World: Fallen Kingdom	831,366	
25	June 24, 2018	Ocean's 8	884,940	
26	July 1, 2018	Ocean's 8	495,818	
27	July 8, 2018	Ant-Man and the Wasp	931,200	
28	July 15, 2018	Hotel Transylvania 3: Summer Vacation	1,611,863	
29	July 22, 2018	Hotel Transylvania 3: Summer Vacation	851,661	
30	July 29, 2018	Incredibles 2	838,845	
31	August 5, 2018	Mission: Impossible – Fallout	1,864,664	
32	August 12, 2018	The Meg	833,742	
33	August 19, 2018	The Meg	530,463	
34	August 26, 2018	Alpha	703,495	
35	September 2, 2018	Alpha	416,482	
36	September 9, 2018	The Nun	1,811,798	
37	September 16, 2018	The Nun	911,112	
38	September 23, 2018	The Nun	544,438	
39	September 30, 2018	Night School	649,678	
40	October 7, 2018	Venom	2,553,269	
41	October 14, 2018	Venom	1,531,940	
42	October 21, 2018	Venom	1,213,015	
43	October 28, 2018	Smallfoot	843,915	
44	November 4, 2018	Bohemian Rhapsody	1,248,320	
45	November 11, 2018	Bohemian Rhapsody	1,147,414	
46	November 18, 2018	Fantastic Beasts: The Crimes of Grindelwald	1,953,460	
47	November 25, 2018	The Grinch	1,290,552	
48	December 2, 2018	The Grinch	960,686	
49	December 9, 2018	Robin Hood	767,995	
50	December 16, 2018	Second Act	697,141	
51	December 23, 2018	Aquaman †	3,015,460	
52	December 30, 2018	Aquaman †	2,213,597	

== Highest-grossing films ==
Highest-grossing films of 2018
Rank	Title	Distributor	Total gross
1	Aquaman	Vertical Entertainment	15,722,391
2	Venom	InterComFilm Distribution	10,029,468
3	Avengers: Infinity War	Forum Film Romania	9,992,353
4	Bohemian Rhapsody	Odeon Cineplex	9,213,080
5	Black Panther	Forum Film Romania	7,590,824
6	Fifty Shades Freed	Ro Image 2000	7,299,098
7	Deadpool 2	Odeon Cineplex	7,075,184
8	Hotel Transylvania 3: Summer Vacation	InterComFilm Distribution	7,032,003
9	The Nun	Vertical Entertainment	6,078,556
10	Mission: Impossible – Fallout	Ro Image 2000	5,377,800

Venom and Aquaman became the 7th & 8th film respectively to surpass the 10 million lei mark.

== See also ==
- List of highest-grossing films in Romania
- List of Romanian films
