= Corporation (role playing game) =

Tabletop science fiction role-playing game

- Designers: James Norbury
- Publishers: Brutal Games
- Publication: 2006
- Genres: Science fiction
- Systems: Brutal Engine
- Website: http://www.corpgame.com/

Corporation is a science fiction role-playing game created by Brutal Games.

== History ==
Brutal Games published Corporation in 2009 through Mongoose Publishing's Flaming Cobra imprint. The game is available for purchase in book form and as PDF files.
