= List of 2021 box office number-one films in Romania =

This is a list of films which have placed number one at the weekend box office in Romania during 2021.

== List ==
†	This implies the highest-grossing movie of the year.

#	Weekend End Date	Film	Total Weekend Gross (Romanian leu)	Notes
1	January 10, 2021	Trolls World Tour	9,795	^{Note}
2	January 17, 2021	The War with Grandpa	6,626	^{Note}
3	January 24, 2021	The War with Grandpa	7,648	^{Note}
4	January 31, 2021	The War with Grandpa	10,608	^{Note}
5	February 7, 2021	The Translators	17,057	^{Note}
6	February 14, 2021	Trolls World Tour	10,138	^{Note}
7	February 21, 2021	Trolls World Tour	12,128	^{Note}
8	February 28, 2021	Monster Hunter	85,600	^{Note}
9	March 7, 2021	Monster Hunter	20,294	^{Note}
10	March 14, 2021	Monster Hunter	12,595	^{Note}
11	March 21, 2021	Monster Hunter	7,168	^{Note}
12	March 28, 2021	Monster Hunter	3,560	^{Note}
13	April 4, 2021	Fast & Furious Presents: Hobbs & Shaw	2,631	^{Note}
14	April 11, 2021	Fast & Furious Presents: Hobbs & Shaw	445	^{Note}
15	April 18, 2021	Monster Hunter	1,144	^{Note}
16	April 25, 2021	Monster Hunter	1,647	^{Note}
17	May 2, 2021	Monster Hunter	1,921	^{Note}
18	May 9, 2021	Bad Luck Banging or Loony Porn	10,098	^{Note}
19	May 16, 2021	Wasp Network	13,883	^{Note}
20	May 23, 2021	Bad Luck Banging or Loony Porn	8,745	^{Note}
21	May 30, 2021	Soul	302,324	
22	June 6, 2021	The Conjuring: The Devil Made Me Do It	784,670	
23	June 13, 2021	Peter Rabbit 2: The Runaway	800,584	
24	June 20, 2021	The Hitman's Wife's Bodyguard	652,503	
25	June 27, 2021	F9	2,975,764	
26	July 4, 2021	F9	1,237,010	
27	July 11, 2021	Black Widow	916,582	
28	July 18, 2021	Luca	732,476	
29	July 25, 2021	Luca	299,581	
30	August 1, 2021	Jungle Cruise	713,315	
31	August 8, 2021	The Suicide Squad	577,927	
32	August 15, 2021	Free Guy	502,229	
33	August 22, 2021	Free Guy	329,175	
34	August 29, 2021	Free Guy	370,276	
35	September 5, 2021	Shang-Chi and the Legend of the Ten Rings	789,295	
36	September 12, 2021	Snow, Tea and Love	524,374	
37	September 19, 2021	Shang-Chi and the Legend of the Ten Rings	406,121	
38	September 26, 2021	Shang-Chi and the Legend of the Ten Rings	187,542	
39	October 3, 2021	No Time to Die	1,350,012	
40	October 10, 2021	No Time to Die	589,427	
41	October 17, 2021	Venom: Let There Be Carnage	1,703,890	
42	October 24, 2021	Dune	1,159,345	
43	October 31, 2021	Dune	526,722	
44	November 7, 2021	Eternals	798,761	
45	November 14, 2021	Eternals	467,149	
46	November 21, 2021	Eternals	317,378	
47	November 28, 2021	House of Gucci	970,964	
48	December 5, 2021	House of Gucci	614,803	
49	December 12, 2021	House of Gucci	469,661	
50	December 19, 2021	Spider-Man: No Way Home †	3,052,455	
51	December 26, 2021	Spider-Man: No Way Home †	1,393,856	
52	January 2, 2022	The Camp	1,532,540	

^{Note}During this weekends indoor cinemas were closed or partially closed due to the COVID-19 pandemic

== Highest-grossing films ==
Highest-grossing films of 2021
Rank	Title	Distributor	Total gross
1	Spider-Man: No Way Home	InterComFilm Distribution	13,610,424
2	F9	Ro Image 2000	9,119,763
3	Dune	Vertical Entertainment	4,954,386
4	Luca	Forum Film Romania	4,531,206
5	House of Gucci	Forum Film Romania	4,473,836
6	Encanto	Forum Film Romania	4,357,774
7	No Time to Die	Forum Film Romania	4,288,637
8	The Camp	Vertical Entertainment	4,115,808
9	Venom: Let There Be Carnage	InterComFilm Distribution	3,715,784
10	Clifford the Big Red Dog	Ro Image 2000	3,290,715

Spider-Man: No Way Home became the 14th film to pass the 10 million lei mark.
