= The Corporation, Cardiff =

Coordinates: 51.4819°N 3.2022°W

The Corporation
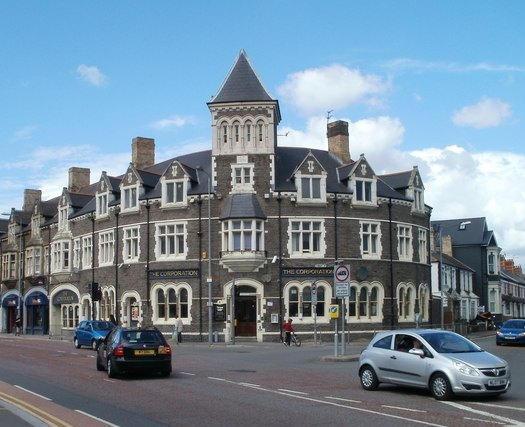
- Interactive map of the The Corporation area

General information
- Type: Public house (1889–2017)
- Location: Canton, 188 Cowbridge Road East, Cardiff CF5 1GW, Cardiff, Wales
- Completed: 1889
- Renovated: 2021

Design and construction
- Designations: Grade II listed building

The Corporation, also known as The Corp, is a public house on a prominent corner of the suburb of Canton in Cardiff, Wales. Opened in 1889 it closed as a pub in 2016, re-opening in November 2021 as a space for independent businesses.

== History and description ==
Dating from 1889 The Corporation was built on Cardiff Corporation land, hence the name. It is on a prominent corner of what was known as Canton Cross (and the site of Canton Market) but nowadays on the corner of Cowbridge Road East and Llandaff Road.

The building is a generous two-storey building faced with dark grey rockfaced pennant sandstone rubble. It has a four storey tower above the main entrance. The Corporation received a Grade II heritage listing in 2001, being a "bold and unaltered piece of late 19th-century street architecture" and in close proximity to Canton Library.

=== 21st century ===
Owned by Cardiff Council, the pub was leased to the pubco, Greene King, until March 2016 when they decided not to renew their tenancy. The leasehold was advertised on behalf of the Council, with its alcohol licence still valid for continued use as a pub.

After reopening for a short period the pub closed again and was sold at auction in November 2018 for £810,000. The new owner had plans to rebrand and reopen it in 2019. In August 2020 during the COVID-19 pandemic, the car park at the rear of The Corporation re-opened as an outdoor pop-up street food venue known as The Corporation Yard.

In early 2021 it was announced that’s the venue would reopen later in the year. The venue would be an extension of the Corporation Yard, with and indoor market space and cafe bar. It be designed by Cardiff based designer Tim Rice divided up into 24 units with tables and chairs spread throughout

The building was repurposed and opened in November 2021 as the "Corp Market", a location for independent retailers, a bar and coffee shop.
