= Miami Bici =

2020 Romanian comedy film

- Film poster
- Directed by: Jesús del Cerro
- Produced by: Matei Dima; Codin Maticiuc; Jesús del Cerro
- Starring: Matei Dima; Codin Maticiuc; Florin Piersic Jr.
- Release date: February 21, 2020 (Romania)
- Running time: 98 minutes
- Country: Romania
- Languages: Romanian; English; Spanish; French
- Budget: €1,500,000 (estimative)
- Box office: $2,663,916

Miami Bici is a 2020 Romanian comedy film directed by Jesús del Cerro and produced by Matei Dima and Codin Maticiuc. The film tells the story of Ion (Dima) and Ilie (Maticiuc), two Romanian friends who go to Miami, Florida for a high-paid job, unbeknownst to them that they are employed in a drug trafficking business. It became a box office success in Romania being the most watched movie in theaters for three weeks in a row and gaining over $2,500,000.

== Cast ==
- Matei Dima as Ion
- Codin Maticiuc as Ilie
- Letiția Vlădescu as Sorana
- Luis Koldo Fombellida as Tony
- Alexandru Baraboi as Mocanu
- Alessandra Bianchi as Marimar
- Antonella Cassia as Police Officer
- Alexander Castro as Cuban #1
- Claudia Coria as Mercedes
- Devin Cruz as Cuban #2
- Rafael Moreno de la Torre as Henchman 1 Mammaia
- Jesús del Cerro as New Romanian #2
- Marius Dreghiciu as Dragoș
- Peter Ebanks as Dead Guy
- Jace Elton as Cop
- Horia Faghi as Loan Kid
- Ana Maria Fulga as Party girl
- Cătălin Gheorghe as Party guy
- Rey Hernandez as Police Officer
- Shuang Hu as Detective Jacky Lin
- Bogdan Ionita as Henchman 4 Mammaia
- Aneta Joanna Kurp as Svetlana
- Puiu Mircea Lascus as Countryman
- Joe Lewis as Emilio
- Vera Linguraru as Country Woman
- Arami Malaise as Ana
- Chloe Malaise as Lucia
- Manuela Mancescu as Silvia
- Bonnie-Love Mastantuono as Eric's Daughter
- Eric M. Mastantuono as Eric
- Christopher Millan as Emilio
- Dan Mario Munteanu as Llie Kid
- Mirela Nicolau as Mamaia
- Florin Piersic, Jr. as Albanezu
- Mihai Popescu as Mișu
- Patricia Ramos as Marisol
- Pedro Rodriguez as George
- Mark Schardan as Pablo
- Adrian Silișteanu as New Romanian #1
- Amanda Tavarez as Juanita
- Marius Tita as Henchman 2 Mammaia
- Rene Toledo as Carlos
- Ion Vasilescu as Henchman 3 Mammaia
- Joseph Velez as Restaurant Owner Pablo
