= Corporate (2026 film) =

2026 Ukrainian comedy film

- («Корпорат»)
- Directed by: Oleksandr Kirienko
- Based on: Teambuilding (2022 Romanian film)
- Produced by: Oleksii Lymarenko; Andrii Nohin; Oleksii Honcharenko
- Starring: Tetiana Malkova; Volodymyr Shumko; Yuliia Ihnatchenko; Pavlo Tekuchev; Yevhen Lamakh
- Cinematography: Oleh Avilov
- Production company: UnitedContentHUB
- Distributed by: B&H Film Distribution Company
- Release date: January 1, 2026 (Ukraine)
- Country: Ukraine
- Language: Ukrainian

Corporate (Ukrainian: Корпорат, romanized: Korporat) a 2026 Ukrainian comedy film directed by Oleksandr Kirienko and produced by the studio UnitedContentHUB as an adaptation of the 2022 Romanian film Teambuilding. The main roles are played by Tetiana Malkova, Volodymyr Shumko, Yuliia Ihnatchenko, Pavlo Tekuchev and Yevhen Lamakh. The film is released in Ukraine on 1 January 2026 by B&H Film Distribution Company.

== Plot ==
The story takes place in the office of a large retail company where management has announced an upcoming staff reduction, creating tension among employees. The fate of the staff is to be decided by a week‑long teambuilding session in the Carpathians, during which the usual “corporate party” turns into a test of character and a struggle for jobs. The events are presented in a comedic vein, with recognisable traits of modern corporate culture and office politics in Ukraine.

== Cast ==
- Tetiana Malkova
- Volodymyr Shumko
- Yuliia Ihnatchenko
- Pavlo Tekuchev
- Yevhen Lamakh
- Vitalii Kozlovskyi
- Illia Parfeniuk
- Mariia Stopnyk
- Iryna Hryshak

== Production ==
The project was first publicly presented in July 2025 during a presentation by Ukrainian distributor B&H Film Distribution Company, where it was announced as a local adaptation of the Romanian box‑office hit Teambuilding (2022). The film was produced by UnitedContentHUB, with creative producer Oleksii Honcharenko, director Oleksandr Kirienko and director of photography Oleh Avilov attached from early stages.

Executive producers on the project include Oleksii Lymarenko and Andrii Nohin. The Ukrainian adaptation retains the basic premise of a corporate teambuilding retreat but relocates the action to the Carpathian region and incorporates elements specific to Ukrainian corporate culture.

Principal photography took place in Kyiv and in locations representing the Carpathians. Filming was completed on 24 September 2025.

== Release ==
The film is scheduled to premiere in Ukrainian cinemas on 1 January 2026, distributed by B&H Film Distribution Company. The release is positioned as a holiday season comedy targeting mass audiences.

== See also ==
- Cinema of Ukraine
