= Teambuilding (film) =

- Theatrical release poster
- Directed by: Alex Cotet; Matei Dima; Cosmin Nedelcu
- Written by: Alex Cotet
- Produced by: Alexandra Hash; Matei Dima; Stefan Lucian
- Starring: Matei Dima; Cosmin Nedelcu; Anca Dinicu; Nicu Banea; Șerban Pavlu; Roxana Condurache; Cristi Pulhac; Monica Odagi; Nuami Dinescu; Anca Munteanu
- Cinematography: Misu Ionescu
- Edited by: Claudiu Trif
- Production company: Vidra Productions
- Distributed by: Vidra Productions
- Release date: September 30, 2022
- Running time: 91 minutes
- Country: Romania
- Language: Romanian
- Budget: $400.000
- Box office: $5.1 million

Teambuilding is a 2022 Romanian comedy film directed by Alex Cotet, Matei Dima & Cosmin Nedelcu and written by Cotet. It stars Matei Dima and Cosmin Nedelcu accompanied by Anca Dinicu, Nicu Banea, Anca Munteanu, Șerban Pavlu, Roxana Condurache, Cristi Pulhac, Monica Odagiu and Nuami Dinescu. It was released on September 30, 2022, in Romanian theaters.

== Synopsis ==
Emil gets too involved and puts pressure on his colleagues. To temper his energy, Mr. Oprea promotes him and makes him a team leader in the call center department, where the unofficial leader is Horia. They all go to the company team building, where Emil joins his new colleagues and does everything he can to help them keep their jobs, competing for a cup with colleagues from Transylvania, Moldova and Oltenia.

== Cast ==
The actors participating in this film are:

- Matei Dima as Emil
- Cosmin Nedelcu as Horia Brenciu
- Anca Dinicu as Lorena
- Nicu Banea as Onel
- Anca Munteanu as Dorina
- Șerban Pavlu as Oprea
- Roxana Condurache as Andreea
- Cristian Pulhac as Shobbi
- Monica Odagi as Erika
- Sorina Stefanescu as Nicoleta
- Bobu Victoria as Lavinia
- Vlad Ianus as Serbanel
- Adrian Nicolae as Spaima
- Nuami Dinescu as Vigilant

== Production ==
Principal photography took place between July and September 2021 in Bucharest, Romania and mountainous areas.

== Reception ==
=== Box-office ===
Teambuilding came first at the Romanian box office, selling 196,155 movie tickets in its first week on theaters. It sold 591,670 tickets in its third week in theaters, becoming the highest-grossing Romanian film for 30 years as well as being the highest-grossing film ever released in the Romanian market, surpassing films such as Avatar and Avengers: Endgame. For its sixth week in theaters, the number of tickets sold amounted to 804,547. It ended its run in theaters with 983,000 tickets sold, which translates to 23.16 million Romanian lei.

=== Accolades ===
Year	Award	Category	Recipient	Result	Ref.
2023	Gopo Awards	Audience Award	Alex Cotet & Alexandra Hash	Won	
2023	Gopo Awards	Young Hope Award	Misu Ionescu	Nominated	

== See also ==
- Corporate (2026 film), a Ukrainian adaptation of the film
