= The Yellow Tie =

Romanian biopic about Sergiu Celibidache

- Romanian: Cravata Galbenă
- Directed by: Serge Ioan Celebidachi
- Written by: Serge Ioan Celebidachi; James Olivier
- Produced by: Adela Vrinceanu Celebidachi; Cristina Dobritoiu; Titi Radoaie; James Olivier
- Starring: Ben Schnetzer; Kate Phillips; Miranda Richardson; Charlie Rowe; Sean Bean; John Malkovich
- Cinematography: Peter Menzies Jr.
- Music by: Kathryn Kluge; Kim Allen Kluge
- Production companies: Oblique Media Film; Celi Films
- Distributed by: Netflix
- Release dates: 14 November 2025 (Bucharest); 10 June 2026 (Netflix)
- Running time: 145 minutes
- Countries: Romania; Italy
- Language: English

The Yellow Tie (Romanian: Cravata Galbenă) is a biographical drama film directed and co-written by Serge Ioan Celibidachi about his father, conductor and composer Sergiu Celibidache. Produced by Serge's wife Adela, it stars Ben Schnetzer and John Malkovich as Sergiu. Kate Phillips, Miranda Richardson, Charlie Rowe, and Sean Bean also appear in supporting roles.

== Cast ==
- Ben Schnetzer as Sergiu Celibidache
  - John Malkovich as older Sergiu
  - Ewan Horrocks as young Sergiu
- Sean Bean as father Demostene Celibidache
- Kate Phillips as wife Ioana Celibidache
  - Miranda Richardson as older Ioana
- Charlie Rowe as Miki
- Anton Lesser as Martin Steinke
- Tamzin Merchant as Ortancia
- Olivia Popica as Sonia Celibidache
- Alecsandru Dunaev as Alberto
- Charles Nishikawa as Mr. Tanaka
- Angelo Boboc as Desiderius Cross

== Production ==
In September 2022, it was announced that Rupert Friend would be cast as the younger version of Celibidache. In June 2023, it was announced that Friend was replaced by Schnetzer. Also in June, it was announced that Bean, Richardson, Phillips, Lesser and Rowe were also cast in the film.

Filming occurred in Romania, particularly in Sala Palatului, in June 2023.

== Release ==
The Yellow Tie premiered in Bucharest in November 2025. It became the most-watched Romanian film of 2026.

The film was released to Netflix in Romania and Moldova on 10 June 2026.
