= 5Gang: Another Kind of Christmas =

2019 Romanian comedy film

- Film poster
- Romanian: 5Gang: Un altfel de Crăciun
- Directed by: 5gang
- Written by: Matei Dima; Vali Dobrogeanu; Radu Alexandru
- Starring: Andrei Șelaru; Diana Condurache; Andrei Gavril; Luca Bogdan; Mădălin Șerban
- Release date: December 27, 2019 (Romania)
- Running time: 96 minutes
- Language: Romanian
- Box office: $1.5 million

5Gang: Another Kind of Christmas (Romanian: 5GANG: Un altfel de Crăciun) is a 2019 Romanian action comedy film directed by Matei Dima. It stars Selly, Diana Condurache, Andrei Gavril, Luca Bogdan Adrian and Mădălin Șerban Păcurar, members of the real-life trap group 5GANG, as themselves in a fictional story about their musical band; when Selly is kidnapped after performing at the anniversary of a local crime boss' daughter birthday, the other band members have to rescue him.

The movie premiered only in Romania on December 27, 2019. A box office success, it became the highest-grossing film in its country in the last thirty years and gained more than $1.5 million during its theatrical run.
