= List of 2022 box office number-one films in India =

This is a list of films which ranked number one at the weekend box office for the year 2022 in India.

== Number-one films ==
†	This implies the highest-grossing movie of the year.

Box office number-one films by weekend in India
#	Weekend end date	Film	Weekend domestic gross	Primary language
1	9 January 2022	Spider-Man: No Way Home	$1,020,000	English
2	16 January 2022	Bangarraju	$1,122,411	Telugu
3	23 January 2022	The King's Man	$19,278	English
4	30 January 2022	Scream	$85,235	English
5	6 February 2022	Veeramae Vaagai Soodum	$1,056,978	Tamil
6	13 February 2022	Badhaai Do	$3,336,745	Hindi
7	20 February 2022	Aaraattu	$3,282,023	Malayalam
8	27 February 2022	Bheemla Nayak	$18,787,720	Telugu
9	6 March 2022	The Batman	$6,871,377	English
10	13 March 2022	Radhe Shyam	$18,216,290	Telugu; Hindi
11	20 March 2022	The Kashmir Files	$14,169,020	Hindi
12	27 March 2022	RRR	$42,674,401	Telugu
13	3 April 2022	RRR	$18,538,384	Telugu
14	10 April 2022	Hurdang	$2,081,549	Hindi
15	17 April 2022	K.G.F: Chapter 2 †	$40,021,684	Kannada
16	24 April 2022	K.G.F: Chapter 2 †	$15,680,985	Kannada
17	1 May 2022	Acharya	$5,804,799	Telugu
18	8 May 2022	Doctor Strange in the Multiverse of Madness	$12,676,832	English
19	15 May 2022	Sarkaru Vaari Paata	$11,336,013	Telugu
20	22 May 2022	Bhool Bhulaiyaa 2	$11,028,752	Hindi
21	29 May 2022	Bhool Bhulaiyaa 2	$6,146,535	Hindi
22	5 June 2022	Vikram	$20,920,610	Tamil
23	12 June 2022	Jurassic World Dominion	$15,353,634	English
24	19 June 2022	777 Charlie	$5,072,479	Kannada
25	26 June 2022	Jugjugg Jeeyo	$4,425,891	Hindi
26	3 July 2022	Jugjugg Jeeyo	$2,666,966	Hindi
27	10 July 2022	Thor: Love and Thunder	$10,800,413	English
28	17 July 2022	The Warriorr	$6,554,578	Telugu
29	24 July 2022	Malayankunju	$2,390,498	Malayalam
30	31 July 2022	Ek Villain Returns	$4,059,789	Hindi
31	7 August 2022	Bimbisara	$4,857,056	Telugu
32	14 August 2022	Laal Singh Chaddha	$11,878,910	Hindi
33	21 August 2022	Thiruchitrambalam	$5,691,528	Tamil
34	28 August 2022	Liger	$4,499,645	Telugu; Hindi
35	4 September 2022	Cobra	$4,610,141	Tamil
36	11 September 2022	Brahmāstra: Part One – Shiva	$17,866,222	Hindi
37	18 September 2022	Brahmāstra: Part One – Shiva	$6,291,081	Hindi
38	25 September 2022	Brahmāstra: Part One – Shiva	$5,747,453	Hindi
39	2 October 2022	Ponniyin Selvan: I	$20,457,950	Tamil
40	9 October 2022	Godfather	$21,331,008	Telugu
41	16 October 2022	Doctor G	$1,924,376	Hindi
42	23 October 2022	Black Adam	$7,882,119	English
43	30 October 2022	Gandhada Gudi	$2,182,521	Kannada
44	6 November 2022	Mrs. Harris Goes to Paris	$23,530	English
45	13 November 2022	Black Panther: Wakanda Forever	$6,432,078	English
46	20 November 2022	Black Panther: Wakanda Forever	$2,018,003	English
47	27 November 2022	Black Panther: Wakanda Forever	$395,939	English
48	4 December 2022	Black Panther: Wakanda Forever	$212,563	English
49	11 December 2022	Black Panther: Wakanda Forever	$93,259	English
50	18 December 2022	Avatar: The Way of Water	$19,158,636	English
51	25 December 2022	Avatar: The Way of Water	$8,946,538	English
52	1 January 2023	Avatar: The Way of Water	$6,078,573	English

== Highest-grossing films ==
=== In-Year Release ===
Highest-grossing films of 2022 by In-year (Only domestic gross collection) release
Rank	Title	Domestic gross	Primary Language	Ref
1	K.G.F: Chapter 2	₹1,008 crore	Kannada	
2	RRR	₹944 crore	Telugu	
3	Avatar: The Way of Water	₹484.36 crore	English	
4	Kantara	₹361 crore	Kannada	
5	Ponniyin Selvan: I	₹327.45 crore	Tamil	
6	Brahmāstra: Part One – Shiva	₹310 crore	Hindi	
7	Vikram	₹302.5 crore	Tamil	
8	The Kashmir Files	₹297.53 crore	Hindi	
9	Drishyam 2	₹286.36 crore	Hindi	
10	Bhool Bhulaiyaa 2	₹220 crore	Hindi	

Highest-grossing films by CBFC rating of 2022
U	F3
U/A	K.G.F: Chapter 2
A	The Kashmir Files

== See also ==
- List of Indian films of 2022
- List of 2023 box office number-one films in India
