= List of Indian films of 2024 =

Indian Films
- Previous: List of Indian films of 2023; Next: List of Indian films of 2025

This is a list of Indian cinema films released in 2024.

== Box office collection ==
The following is the list of highest-grossing Indian films released in 2024. The rank of the films in the following table depends on the estimate of worldwide collections as reported by reliable sources. There is no official tracking of domestic box office figures within India.

Background shading indicates that a film is currently showing in theatres worldwide.

Highest grossing Indian films of 2024
Rank	Title	Production company	Language	Worldwide Gross (crore)	Ref.
1	Pushpa 2: The Rule	Mythri Movie Makers; Sukumar Writings	Telugu	₹1,800	(Note: Pushpa 2's reported worldwide gross is ₹1,800 crore (The Hans India) ₹1,800 crore (Deccan Chronicle; The Indian Express).)
2	Kalki 2898 AD	Vyjayanthi Movies	Telugu	₹1,042–1,100	(Note: Kalki 2898 AD's reported worldwide grosses vary between ₹1,042 (The Financial Express (India)) – ₹1,052.5 crore (ThePrint) – ₹1,100 crore (Deccan Chronicle, Business Standard, Deccan Herald, Hindustan Times and The Statesman))
3	Stree 2	Maddock Films; Jio Studios	Hindi	₹874.58–875	(Note: Stree 2's reported worldwide grosses vary between ₹874.58 crore (Bollywood Hungama) – ₹875 crore (Hindustan Times))
4	The Greatest of All Time	AGS Entertainment	Tamil	₹440–460	(Note: GOAT's reported worldwide grosses vary between ₹440 crore (Box Office India; The Hans India) – ₹452 crore (The Economic Times; NDTV) – ₹460 crore (Filmfare))
5	Bhool Bhulaiyaa 3	T-Series Films; Cine1 Studios	Hindi	₹423.85	
6	Singham Again	Reliance Entertainment; Jio Studios; Rohit Shetty Picturez; Devgn Film; Cinergy	Hindi	₹389.64	
7	Devara: Part 1	N. T. R. Arts; Yuvasudha Arts	Telugu	₹380–521	(Note: Devara's reported worldwide grosses vary between ₹380 crore (Box Office India) – ₹420 crore (DNA India) – ₹509 crore (Business Standard) – ₹521 crore (Bollywood Hungama))
8	Fighter	Viacom18 Studios; Marflix Pictures	Hindi	₹344.46	
9	Amaran	Raaj Kamal Films International; Sony Pictures Films India	Tamil	₹320–335	(Note: Amaran's reported worldwide grosses vary between ₹320 crore (India Today, Hindustan Times, Mint, and News18) – ₹335 crore (Moneycontrol and The Hans India))
10	Hanu-Man	Primeshow Entertainment	Telugu	₹298.18–350	(Note: Hanu-Man's reported worldwide grosses vary between ₹298.18 crore (Deccan Chronicle) – ₹350 crore (Hindustan Times Telugu and The Indian Express))

== Lists of Indian films of 2024 ==
- List of Assamese films of 2024
- List of Bengali films of 2024
- List of Bhojpuri films of 2024
- List of Gujarati films of 2024
- List of Hindi films of 2024
- List of Kannada films of 2024
- List of Malayalam films of 2024
- List of Marathi films of 2024
- List of Odia films of 2024
- List of Punjabi films of 2024
- List of Tamil films of 2024
- List of Telugu films of 2024
- List of Tulu films of 2024

== See also ==
- List of Indian films of 2025
- List of Indian films of 2023
- List of 2024 box office number-one films in India

== Notes ==
Preceded by 2023	Indian films 2024	Succeeded by 2025
