= List of Indian films of 2023 =

Indian Films
- Previous: List of Indian films of 2022; Next: List of Indian films of 2024

This is a list of Indian cinema films released in 2023.

== Box office collection ==
The following is the list of highest-grossing Indian films released in 2023. The rank of the films in the following table depends on the estimate of worldwide collections as reported by organizations classified as green by Wikipedia. (Note: See WP:RSP, WP:ICTFSOURCES) There is no official tracking of domestic box office figures within India.

Highest grossing Indian cinema films of 2023
Rank (Note: Sorted based on the lowest value when figures are presented as a range, and for the same value, the older item is given a higher order.)	Title	Production company	Language	Worldwide gross (crore)	Ref.
1	Jawan	Red Chillies Entertainment	Hindi	₹1,148.32	
2	Pathaan	Yash Raj Films	Hindi	₹1,050.30	
3	Animal	T-Series Films; Bhadrakali Pictures; Cine1 Studios	Hindi	₹917.82	
4	Gadar 2	Zee Studios; Anil Sharma Productions; MM Movies	Hindi	₹691.08–700	(Note: Gadar 2's reported worldwide grosses vary between ₹691.08 crore (Bollywood Hungama) – ₹700 crore (The Financial Express))
5	Salaar: Part 1 – Ceasefire	Hombale Films	Telugu	₹612–700	(Note: Salaar: Part 1 – Ceasefire's reported worldwide grosses vary between ₹612 crore (Box Office India) – ₹700 crore (Firstpost and India Today))
6	Jailer	Sun Pictures	Tamil	₹605–650	(Note: Jailer's reported worldwide grosses vary between ₹605 crore (India Today) – ₹650 crore (Firstpost, Cinema Express))
7	Leo	Seven Screen Studio	Tamil	₹595–615	(Note: Leo's reported worldwide grosses vary between ₹595 crore (Box Office India) – ₹615 crore (Deccan Chronicle).)
8	Dunki	Red Chillies Entertainment; Jio Studios; Rajkumar Hirani Films	Hindi	₹470.60	
9	Tiger 3	Yash Raj Films	Hindi	₹466.63	
10	Adipurush	T-Series Films; Retrophiles	Telugu	₹392.70	(Note: Adipurush's reported worldwide gross is ₹392.70 crore according to Business Today, Deccan Chronicle, and News18.)

== Lists of Indian films of 2023 ==
- List of Assamese films of 2023
- List of Bengali films of 2023
- List of Bhojpuri films of 2023
- List of Gujarati films of 2023
- List of Hindi films of 2023
- List of Kannada films of 2023
- List of Malayalam films of 2023
- List of Marathi films of 2023
- List of Odia films of 2023
- List of Punjabi films of 2023
- List of Tamil films of 2023
- List of Telugu films of 2023
- List of Tulu films of 2023

== See also ==
- List of Indian films of 2024
- List of Indian films of 2022
- List of 2023 box office number-one films in India

== Notes ==
Preceded by 2022	Indian films 2023	Succeeded by 2024
