= List of Indian films of 2022 =

Indian Films
- Previous: List of Indian films of 2021; Next: List of Indian films of 2023

This is the list of Indian films that were released in 2022.

== Box office collection ==
The list of highest-grossing Indian films released in 2022, by worldwide box office gross revenue, are as follows:

Denotes films still running in cinemas worldwide

Implies that the film is multilingual and the gross collection figure includes the worldwide collection of the other simultaneously filmed version.

Rank	Title	Production company	Language	Gross ₹ crore (est.)	Ref
1	RRR	DVV Entertainment	Telugu	₹1,253 crore (US$159.41 million)–₹1,387 crore (US$176.45 million)	(Note: RRR's reported worldwide grosses vary between ₹1,253 crore (Pinkvilla) – ₹1,300 crore (News18 India, India Today, DNA) – ₹1,387 crore (NDTV India))
2	KGF: Chapter 2	Hombale Films	Kannada	₹1,200 crore (US$152.66 million)–₹1,250 crore (US$159.02 million)	(Note: While The New Indian Express and DNA India reported that the worldwide collection to be around ₹1,200 crore to ₹1,216 crore, The Hindustan Times mentioned the collection as ₹1,207 crore. News 18 and India Today mentioned that the collection was ₹1,240 crore. The Times Of India, Vijaya Karnataka, TV9 Kannada and Asianet News reported that the movie grossed ₹1258 crores.)
3	Ponniyin Selvan: I	Madras Talkies	Tamil	₹500 crore (US$63.61 million)	(Note: Ponniyin Selvan: I's reported worldwide gross is ₹500 crore according to Hindustan Times, Outlook India, News18, and The Economic Times.)
4	Vikram	Raaj Kamal Films International	Tamil	₹414.43 crore (US$52.72 million)–₹500 crore (US$63.61 million)	
5	Kantara	Hombale Films	Kannada	₹393.3 crore (US$50.04 million)–₹450 crore (US$57.25 million)	
6	Brahmāstra: Part One – Shiva	Dharma Productions	Hindi	₹418.8 crore (US$53.28 million)–₹430 crore (US$54.7 million)	
7	Drishyam 2	Panorama Studios; Viacom18 Studios; T-Series Films	Hindi	₹345.05 crore (US$43.9 million)	
8	The Kashmir Files	Zee Studios; Abhishek Agarwal Arts	Hindi	₹340.95 crore (US$43.38 million)	
9	Bhool Bhulaiyaa 2	T-Series Films; Cine1 Studios	Hindi	₹266.85 crore (US$33.95 million)	
10	Beast	Sun Pictures	Tamil	₹251 crore (US$31.93 million)	

== Box office records ==
- RRR set several records for an Indian film.
  - It became the first Indian movie to reach the $100 million mark in the COVID-19 pandemic era, grossing more than $160 million.
  - It set the record for the biggest opening day for an Indian film, grossing ₹240 crore (US$30 million in 2022) in its first day to surpass S.S. Rajamouli's previous directed film, Baahubali 2: The Conclusion (2017).
  - It set the record for the highest-grossing Indian film in Japan, surpassing Muthu (1995). It grossed $15.2 million in Japan.

== Lists of Indian films of 2022 ==
- List of Bhojpuri films of 2022
- List of Hindi films of 2022
- List of Malayalam films of 2022
- List of Tamil films of 2022
- List of Telugu films of 2022
- List of Kannada films of 2022
- List of Marathi films of 2022
- List of Punjabi films of 2022
- List of Gujarati films of 2022
- List of Tulu films of 2022
- List of Indian Bengali films of 2022

== See also ==
- List of Indian films of 2023
- List of Indian films of 2021
- List of 2022 box office number-one films in India

== Notes ==
Preceded by 2021	Indian films 2022	Succeeded by 2023
