= List of 2023 box office number-one films in India =

This is a list of films which ranked number one at the weekend box office for the year 2023 in India.

== Number-one films ==
2023 Box office number-one films by weekend in India
#	Weekend end date	Film	Weekend domestic gross	Primary language
1	8 January 2023	Avatar: The Way of Water	$2,427,868	English
2	15 January 2023	Avatar: The Way of Water	$1,057,950	English
3	22 January 2023	Avatar: The Way of Water	$1,057,950	English
4	29 January 2023	Avatar: The Way of Water	$225,817	English
5	5 February 2023	Avatar: The Way of Water	$203,924	English
6	12 February 2023	Titantic (25th Anniversary re-release)	$315,875	English
7	19 February 2023	Ant-Man and the Wasp: Quantumania	$3,746,710	English
8	26 February 2023	Ant-Man and the Wasp: Quantumania	$730,533	English
9	5 March 2023	Ant-Man and the Wasp: Quantumania	$367,914	English
10	12 March 2023	Ant-Man and the Wasp: Quantumania	$125,264	English
11	19 March 2023	Shazam! Fury of the Gods	$1,224,489	English
12	26 March 2023	John Wick: Chapter 4	$3,649,723	English
13	2 April 2023	John Wick: Chapter 4	$730,136	English
14	9 April 2023	The Super Mario Bros. Movie	$934,370	English
15	16 April 2023	The Super Mario Bros. Movie	$647,783	English
16	23 April 2023	Evil Dead Rise	$1,519,164	English
17	30 April 2023	Sisu	$282,156	English; Finnish
18	7 May 2023	Guardians of the Galaxy Vol. 3	$3,672,886	English
19	14 May 2023	Guardians of the Galaxy Vol. 3	$1,454,547	English
20	21 May 2023	Fast X	$7,360,726	English
21	28 May 2023	Fast X	$2,607,230	English
22	4 June 2023	Fast X	$880,144	English
23	11 June 2023	Fast X	$309,281	English
24	18 June 2023	The Flash	$2,522,941	English
25	25 June 2023	Elemental	$404,392	English
26	2 July 2023	Maamannan	$13,808,113	Tamil
27	9 July 2023	Insidious: The Red Door	$1,653,615	English
28	16 July 2023	Mission: Impossible - Dead Reckoning Part One	$9,006,702	English
29	23 July 2023	Oppenheimer	$7,158,610	English
30	30 July 2023	Oppenheimer	$2,904,721	English
31	6 August 2023	Oppenheimer	$1,666,049	English
32	13 August 2023	Oppenheimer	$606,850	English
33	20 August 2023	Blue Beetle	$962,138	English
34	27 August 2023	Oppenheimer	$184,540	English
35	3 September 2023	Oppenheimer	$113,848	English
36	10 September 2023	The Nun II	$2,110,278	English
37	17 September 2023	A Haunting in Venice	$169,802	English
38	24 September 2023	A Haunting in Venice	$56,759	English
39	1 October 2023	The Creator	$281,359	English
40	8 October 2023	The Exorcist: Believer	$709,699	English
41	15 October 2023	The Exorcist: Believer	$349,355	English
42	22 October 2023	The Exorcist: Believer	$34,997	English
43	29 October 2023	Five Nights at Freddy's	$40,024	English
44	5 November 2023	The Exorcist: Believer	$8,959	English
45	12 November 2023	The Marvels	$902,564	English
46	19 November 2023	The Marvels	$219,673	English
47	26 November 2023	Wish	$160,288	English
48	3 December 2023	Animal	$24,269,782	Hindi
49	10 December 2023	The Hunger Games: The Ballad of Songbirds & Snakes	$11,884	English
50	17 December 2023	Wish	$2,301	English
51	24 December 2023	Wish	TBD	English
52	31 December 2023	Migration	$187,032	English

== Highest-grossing films ==
=== In-Year Release ===
Highest-grossing films of 2023 by In-year (Only domestic gross collection) release
Rank	Title	Domestic gross	Primary Language	Ref
1	Jawan	₹761.98 crore	Hindi	
2	Animal	₹662.33 crore	Hindi	
3	Pathaan	₹654.28 crore	Hindi	
4	Gadar 2	₹625.54 crore	Hindi	
5	Salaar: Part 1 – Ceasefire	₹565.42 crore	Telugu	
6	Jailer	₹430 crore	Tamil	
7	Leo	₹417 crore	Tamil	
8	Tiger 3	₹346.08 crore	Hindi	
9	The Kerala Story	₹288.04 crore	Hindi	
10	Dunki	₹262.25 crore	Hindi	

Highest-grossing films by CBFC rating of 2023
U	N/A
U/A	Jawan
A	Animal

== See also ==
- List of Indian films of 2023
- List of 2022 box office number-one films in India
- List of 2024 box office number-one films in India
