= List of 2024 box office number-one films in India =

This is a list of films which ranked number one at the weekend box office for the year 2024 in India as per Mojo.

== Number-one films ==
2024 Box office number-one films by weekend in India as per Mojo
#	Weekend end date	Film	Weekend domestic gross	Primary language	Ref
1	7 January	Migration	$105,787	English	
2	14 January	Migration	$48,645	English	
3	21 January	Night Swim	$55,756	English	
4	28 Januaryf	Migration	$17,229	English	
5	4 February	Next Goal Wins	$15,031	English	
6	11 February	Migration	$16,592	English	
7	18 February	The Holdovers	$28,969	English	
8	25 February	Article 370	$3,130,817	Hindi	
9	3 March	Article 370	$2,275,402	Hindi	
10	10 March	Article 370	$1,105,755	Hindi	
11	17 March	Kung Fu Panda 4	$2,076,624	English	
12	24 March	Kung Fu Panda 4	$1,189,874	English	
13	31 March	Godzilla x Kong: The New Empire	$6,117,263	English	
14	7 April	Kung Fu Panda 4	$419,496	English	
15	14 April	Kung Fu Panda 4	$209,609	English	
16	21 April	Kung Fu Panda 4	$122,443	English	
17	28 April	Kung Fu Panda 4	$175,622	English	
18	5 May	The Fall Guy	$493,400	English	
19	12 May	Kingdom of the Planet of the Apes	$1,680,963	English	
20	19 May	Kingdom of the Planet of the Apes	$616,758	English	
21	26 May	Furiosa: A Mad Max Saga	$1,594,997	English	
22	Jun May	Kingdom of the Planet of the Apes	$78,761	English	
23	9 June	Kingdom of the Planet of the Apes	$29,499	English	
24	16 June	Inside Out 2	$875,487	English	
25	23 June	Inside Out 2	$816,317	English	
26	30 June	Inside Out 2	$407,991	English	
27	7 July	Inside Out 2	$244,144	English	
28	14 July	Despicable Me 4	$505,043	English	
29	21 July	Despicable Me 4	$278,940	English	
30	28 July	Deadpool & Wolverine	$9,718,183	English	
31	4 August	Deadpool & Wolverine	$3,062,936	English	
32	11 August	Deadpool & Wolverine	$1,755,429	English	
33	18 August	Deadpool & Wolverine	$236,512	English	
34	25 August	Alien: Romulus	$528,577	English	
35	Sep August	Deadpool & Wolverine	$154,006	English	
36	8 September	Deadpool & Wolverine	$63,864	English	
37	15 September	Speak No Evil	$114,539	English	
38	22 September	Never Let Go	$66,409	English	
39	29 September	Never Let Go	$45,516	English	
40	6 October	Inside Out 2	$11,272	English	
41	13 October	White Bird	$35,058	English	
42	20 October	The Wild Robot	$435,727	English	
43	27 October	The Wild Robot	$164,721	English	
44	3 November	Longlegs	$237,263	English	
45	10 November	The Wild Robot	$91,503	English	
46	17 November	Venom: The Last Dance	$7,733,109	English	
47	24 November	Longlegs	$390,022	English	
48	Dec November	Moana 2	$1,572,870	English	
49	8 December	Moana 2	$581,226	English	
50	15 December	Moana 2	$365,654	English	
51	22 December	Mufasa: The Lion King	$4,816,728	English	
52	29 December	Mufasa: The Lion King	$3,461,006	English	

== Highest-grossing films ==
=== In-Year Release ===
Highest-grossing films of 2024 by In-year (Only domestic gross collection) release
Rank	Title	Domestic gross	Primary Language	Ref
1	Pushpa 2: The Rule	₹1,381 crore	Telugu	
2	Kalki 2898 AD	₹800 crore	Telugu	
3	Stree 2	₹740.28 crore	Hindi	
4	Devara: Part 1	₹329.25 crore	Telugu	
5	Bhool Bhulaiyaa 3	₹328.33 crore	Hindi	
6	Singham Again	₹316.45 crore	Hindi	
7	The Greatest of All Time	₹305 crore	Tamil	(Note: The Greatest of All Time's reported worldwide grosses vary between ₹455.63 (News18)- ₹456 crore (Pinkvilla))
8	Amaran	₹252.43 crore	Tamil	
9	Fighter	₹244.7 crore	Hindi	
10	Hanu-Man	₹243.2 crore	Telugu	

Highest-grossing films by CBFC rating of 2024
U	Kung Fu Panda 4
U/A	Pushpa 2: The Rule
A	Deadpool & Wolverine

== See also ==
- List of Indian films of 2024
- List of 2023 box office number-one films in India
- List of 2025 box office number-one films in India
