= RRR =

2022 Indian film by S. S. Rajamouli

- Theatrical release poster
- Directed by: S. S. Rajamouli
- Screenplay by: S. S. Rajamouli
- Story by: V. Vijayendra Prasad
- Dialogues by: Sai Madhav Burra
- Produced by: D. V. V. Danayya
- Starring: N. T. Rama Rao Jr.; Ram Charan; Ajay Devgn; Alia Bhatt; Shriya Saran; Samuthirakani; Ray Stevenson; Alison Doody; Olivia Morris
- Cinematography: K. K. Senthil Kumar
- Visual effects by: V. Srinivas Mohan
- Edited by: A. Sreekar Prasad
- Music by: M. M. Keeravani
- Production company: DVV Entertainment
- Distributed by: see below
- Release date: 25 March 2022
- Running time: 182 minutes
- Country: India
- Language: Telugu
- Budget: ₹550 crore
- Box office: ₹1,300−1,387 crore (Note: RRR's reported worldwide grosses vary between ₹1,300 crore (News18 India, India Today, DNA) – ₹1,387 crore (NDTV India))

RRR (Note: The title's expanded form is Raudraṁ Raṇaṁ Rudhiraṁ (transl. "Rage, War, Blood") in Telugu, however, "RRR" (abbreviated in English from "Rise, Roar, Revolt") is used as the common title across all dubbed versions, with their respective full forms in those languages.) is a 2022 Indian Telugu-language epic period action drama film directed by S. S. Rajamouli, who co-wrote the screenplay with V. Vijayendra Prasad. Produced by D. V. V. Danayya under DVV Entertainment, the film stars N. T. Rama Rao Jr. and Ram Charan in lead roles. It also features an ensemble cast of Ajay Devgn, Alia Bhatt, Shriya Saran, Samuthirakani, Ray Stevenson, Alison Doody and Olivia Morris in supporting roles. It marks the Telugu film debuts of Devgn, Bhatt, Stevenson, Doody and Morris. The film is a fictionalised tale of two historical freedom fighters, set in the Indian pre-independence era.

Rajamouli conceptualised the film by reimagining the lives of Sitarama Raju and Bheem, envisioning their meeting in 1920s Delhi as two formidable forces uniting to battle British colonial rule. The film was officially announced in March 2018, and principal photography began in November 2018 in Hyderabad. The production faced delays due to the COVID-19 pandemic and concluded in August 2021. RRR was shot extensively across India, with additional sequences filmed in Ukraine and Bulgaria. The film's songs and background score were composed by M. M. Keeravani, with cinematography by K. K. Senthil Kumar and editing by A. Sreekar Prasad. Sabu Cyril served as the production designer, and V. Srinivas Mohan supervised the visual effects.

Made on a budget of ₹550 crore, RRR was the most expensive Indian film at the time of its release. The film was released theatrically on 25 March 2022 and became the first Indian film to be released in Dolby Cinema format. It received universal critical acclaim for its direction, screenwriting, cast performances, cinematography, soundtrack, action sequences and VFX. With ₹223 crore worldwide on its first day, RRR recorded the highest opening-day earned by an Indian film at the time. It emerged as the highest-grossing film in its home market of Andhra Pradesh and Telangana, grossing over ₹415 crore and is maintaining it till date. The film grossed ₹1,300–1,387 crore worldwide, setting several box office records for an Indian film. It currently ranks the seventh highest-grossing Indian film, the third highest-grossing Telugu film and the highest grossing Indian film of 2022 worldwide.

RRR was considered one of the ten best films of the year by the National Board of Review, making it only the second non-English language film ever to make it to the list. The song "Naatu Naatu" won the Oscar for Best Original Song at the 95th Academy Awards, making it the first song from an Asian film to win in this category. The win made RRR the first and only Indian feature film to win an Academy Award. The film became the third Indian film and first Telugu film to receive nominations at the Golden Globe Awards, including Best Foreign Language Film, and won Best Original Song for "Naatu Naatu", making it the first Indian (as well as the first Asian) nominee to win the award. RRR also won the awards for Best Foreign Language Film and Best Song at the 28th Critics' Choice Awards. At the 69th National Film Awards, the film won six awards, including Best Popular Feature Film, Best Music Direction (Keeravani) and Best Male Playback Singer (Kaala Bhairava for "Komuram Bheemudo").

== Plot ==
In 1920, in the British Raj, the tyrannical Governor Scott Buxton and his wife, Catherine, visit a forest in Adilabad, where they encounter Malli, a gifted young girl from the Gond tribe. Impressed by her artistic talent, Catherine abducts Malli and takes her to Delhi. The tribe's guardian, Komaram Bheem, travels to Delhi to rescue her, adopting the Muslim pseudonym "Akhtar". The Government of Hyderabad warns the Government of the British Raj about Bheem, prompting Catherine to recruit Alluri Sitarama "Ram" Raju, an ambitious and highly skilled Indian Imperial Police officer. She promises him a promotion for capturing Bheem alive, or a substantial bounty otherwise.

Ram and his uncle, Venkateswarulu, attend a pro-independence gathering in disguise. Bheem's aide, Lachhu, attempts to recruit them, but discovers Ram's identity and flees. Soon afterwards, Ram and Bheem independently rescue a boy trapped beneath a burning train wreck. Their unspoken coordination establishes a profound friendship, despite their opposing allegiances.

With Ram's help, Bheem courts Jennifer "Jenny", a compassionate Englishwoman and Governor Buxton's niece. After Ram and Bheem impressively out-dance the British guests at a party, Jenny invites Bheem to the Buxton residence. He locates Malli by her singing and promises to rescue her. Meanwhile, Ram captures Lachhu, who releases a venomous banded krait during interrogation. Lachhu escapes, warning that the British have no antidote, but the Gond people do. Bheem finds the dying Ram and uses his tribal knowledge to save him. Grateful, Bheem reveals his true identity and his mission, unaware that Ram is hunting him.

At a gala for Governor Buxton, Bheem's revolutionaries breach the palace by driving a truck carrying wild animals into the courtyard. Amid the ensuing chaos, Bheem attempts to free Malli, but Ram intercepts him. Their fight ends when Buxton holds Malli at gunpoint, forcing Bheem to surrender. He is arrested, while Ram receives his promised promotion.

A flashback reveals that Ram's father, Alluri Venkatarama Raju, was a revolutionary who died seeking to arm his village with British rifles. Ram had promised to fulfil his dream and infiltrated the colonial police as a deep-cover mole, leaving his village and fiancée, Sita. His promotion gives him access to imperial weapons. During Bheem's public flogging, Ram urges him to recant, but Bheem refuses and sings a defiant anthem of freedom, inspiring the crowd and convincing Ram that courage can achieve what weapons alone cannot. Ram decides to save him, persuading Buxton to execute Bheem privately while arranging an ambush. Buxton discovers the betrayal and wounds Ram. Misinterpreting Ram's actions as an attempt to harm Malli, Bheem attacks him and escapes with her. Ram is arrested for high treason and imprisoned in solitary confinement.

Months later, Bheem, Malli and their comrades evade authorities in Hathras. Sita, who has learnt of Ram's impending execution, saves them by falsely claiming that a smallpox outbreak has occurred. Unaware of Bheem's identity, she reveals Ram's lifelong anti-colonial mission. Realising his mistake, Bheem vows to rescue him.

With logistical help from Jenny, Bheem infiltrates the barracks and frees Ram. In a nearby forest, they repel pursuing soldiers before attacking the British stronghold. Ram uses a longbow from an ancestral Rama shrine alongside Bheem's spear, while the pair ignite the ammunition stores with a flaming motorcycle. Bheem retrieves a large cache of rifles for Ram before the facility explodes, killing Catherine and the garrison. Ram gives Bheem an imperial rifle, with which he shoots the wounded Governor Buxton in symbolic vengeance for his disregard for human life.

Afterwards, Ram reunites with Sita, while Bheem and Malli return to their tribe in Adilabad, where Malli is reunited with her mother. When Ram asks how he can repay Bheem, Bheem requests that he teach him to read and write. Ram begins the lesson by using a canvas and blood to teach Bheem his first letters.

== Cast ==
- N. T. Rama Rao Jr. as Komaram Bheem, a Gond tribal leader from Telangana who fought against the Nizam for the liberation of Hyderabad State
- Ram Charan as Alluri Sitarama Raju, a revolutionary leader from Andhra Pradesh who waged an armed campaign against the British Raj
  - Varun Buddhadev as Young Rama Raju
- Ajay Devgn as Alluri Venkatarama Raju, Rama Raju's late father
- Alia Bhatt as Sita, Rama Raju's fiancé (guest appearance)
  - Spandan Chaturvedi as Young Sita
- Shriya Saran as Sarojini, Venkatarama Raju's wife and Rama Raju's late mother
- Samuthirakani as Alluri Venkateswarulu Raju, Venkatarama Raju's brother and Rama Raju's uncle
- Ray Stevenson as Governor Scott Buxton
- Alison Doody as Catherine Buxton
- Olivia Morris as Jennifer "Jenny"
- Chatrapathi Sekhar as Jangu, Bheem's companion
- Makarand Deshpande as Peddayya, Bheem's companion
- Rajeev Kanakala as Venkat Avadhani, special advisor to the Nizam
- Rahul Ramakrishna as Lacchu
- Edward Sonnenblick as Edward
- Mark Bennington as Cunningham
- Eduard Buhac as Jake
- Preet Gadrana as Stone Thrower
- R. Bhakti Klein as DSP Philip Green
- Ahmareen Anjum as Loki, Malli's mother
- Twinkle Sharma as Malli
- Chakri as Chinna, Rama Raju's brother
- S. S. Rajamouli as himself in the song "Etthara Jenda" (special appearance)

== Production ==
=== Development ===
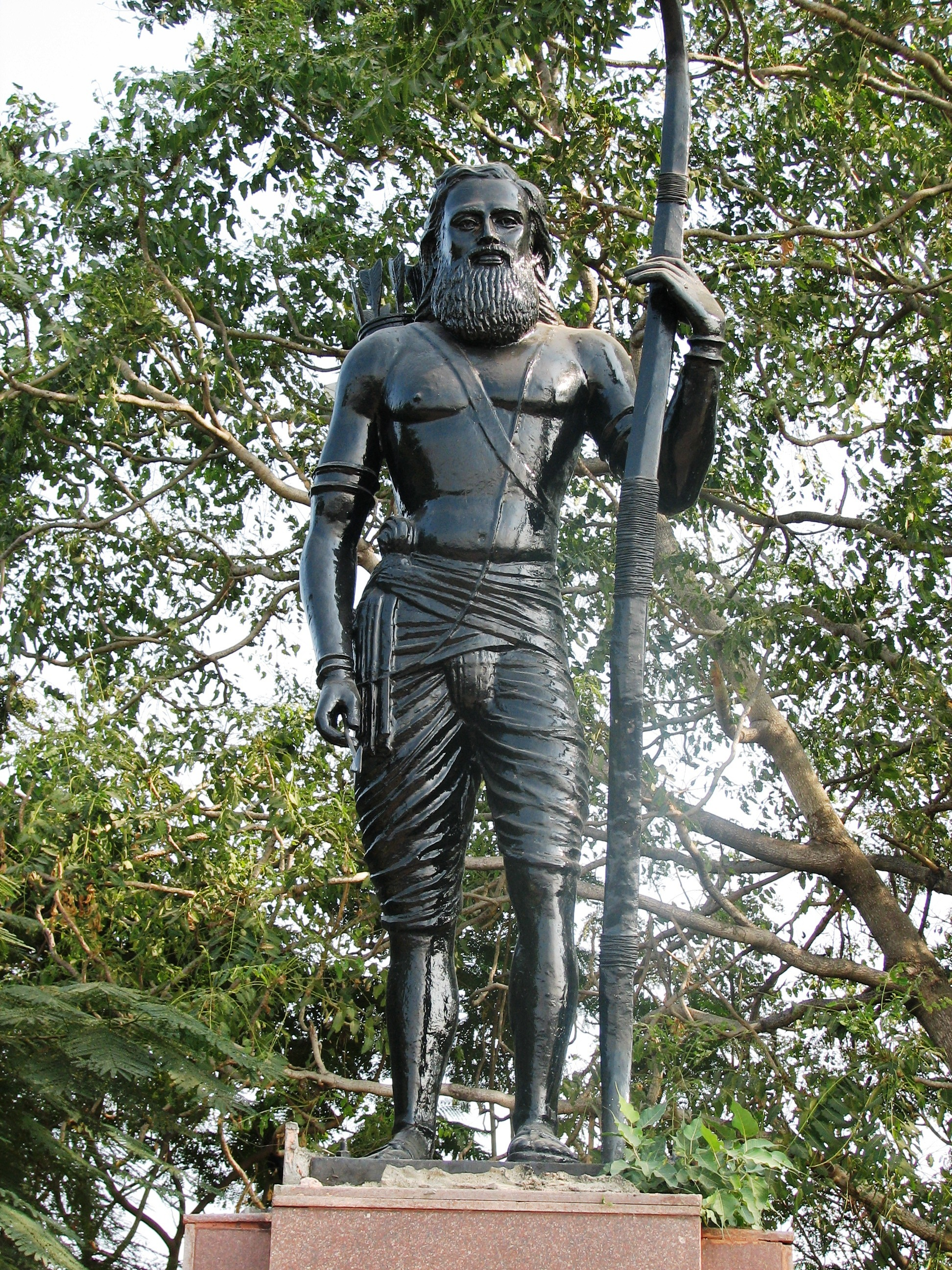
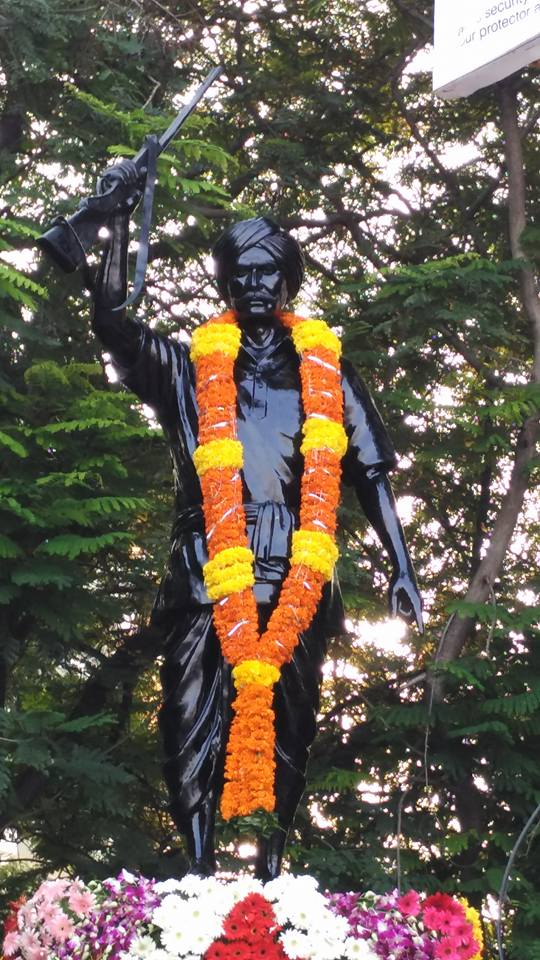
Alluri Sitarama Raju (left) and Komaram Bheem (right), the real-life Indian revolutionaries fictionalised in the film

In October 2017, in an interview with Variety, S. S. Rajamouli announced two projects after Baahubali 2: The Conclusion (2017) with producers D. V. V. Danayya of DVV Entertainment and K. L. Narayana. Rajamouli prioritised his work on the former, which was touted to be a social drama film, and which would be followed by Narayana's production with actor Mahesh Babu. In November 2017, Rajamouli shared a picture with N. T. Rama Rao Jr. and Ram Charan through his social media handles, hinting their inclusion in the film.

Rajamouli came across real-life stories about the lives of Rama Raju and Bheem and connected the coincidences between them, imagining what would have happened had they met, and been friends.

The film was announced in March 2018, with the tentative title RRR, an abbreviation for Rajamouli, Ram Charan, and Rama Rao. The tentative title RRR was later confirmed to be the film's official title as Rajamouli felt that a universal title across the languages was essential for a film of such scale. Principal photography of the film began in November 2018 in Hyderabad and continued until August 2021, owing to delays caused by the COVID-19 pandemic. It was filmed extensively across India, with a few sequences filmed in Ukraine and Bulgaria.

Rajamouli's father V. Vijayendra Prasad gave the original story and Rajamouli scripted the film, which he worked on for six months. In September 2018, writer Sai Madhav Burra was signed for the dialogues for the film in the primary language (Telugu), whereas dialogues in other versions were written by Madhan Karky (Tamil), Varadaraj Chikkaballapura (Kannada), Mamkombu Gopalakrishnan (Malayalam), and Riya Mukherjee (Hindi). Rajamouli retained several technicians from his previous projects. The crew consists of M. M. Keeravani as the music director, K. K. Senthil Kumar as the director of photography, A. Sreekar Prasad as the film editor, Sabu Cyril as the production designer, V. Srinivas Mohan handling the visual effects supervision, and Rama Rajamouli as the costume designer. Nick Powell was the stunt director for the film, and handled the choreography for the climax action sequences in the film. Prior to the start of film production, both Rama Rao and Charan had attended a special workshop in mid-November 2018, in order to train physically and intensively for their roles in the film.

RRR is an entirely fictitious story incorporating the lives of two real-life Indian revolutionaries, namely Alluri Sitarama Raju and Komaram Bheem, who fought against the British Raj and the Nizam of Hyderabad respectively. Charan plays Rama Raju while Rama Rao plays Komaram Bheem. The plot explores their stay in Delhi of the 1920s before they begin the fight for their country. Rajamouli stated that there had been a coincidence between the two Telugu tribal leaders and the events surrounding over them.

When I read about Alluri Sitarama Raju and Komaram Bheem, it was exciting to know that their story is similar. They never met each other. What if they had met? What if they had got inspired by each other? That is what RRR is about. It is completely fictitious. The film is mounted on a very large scale. We had to do a lot of research for it. To know costumes, their dialect, their way of living and that is why it took so much time for us to get this together.

— S. S. Rajamouli

=== Casting ===
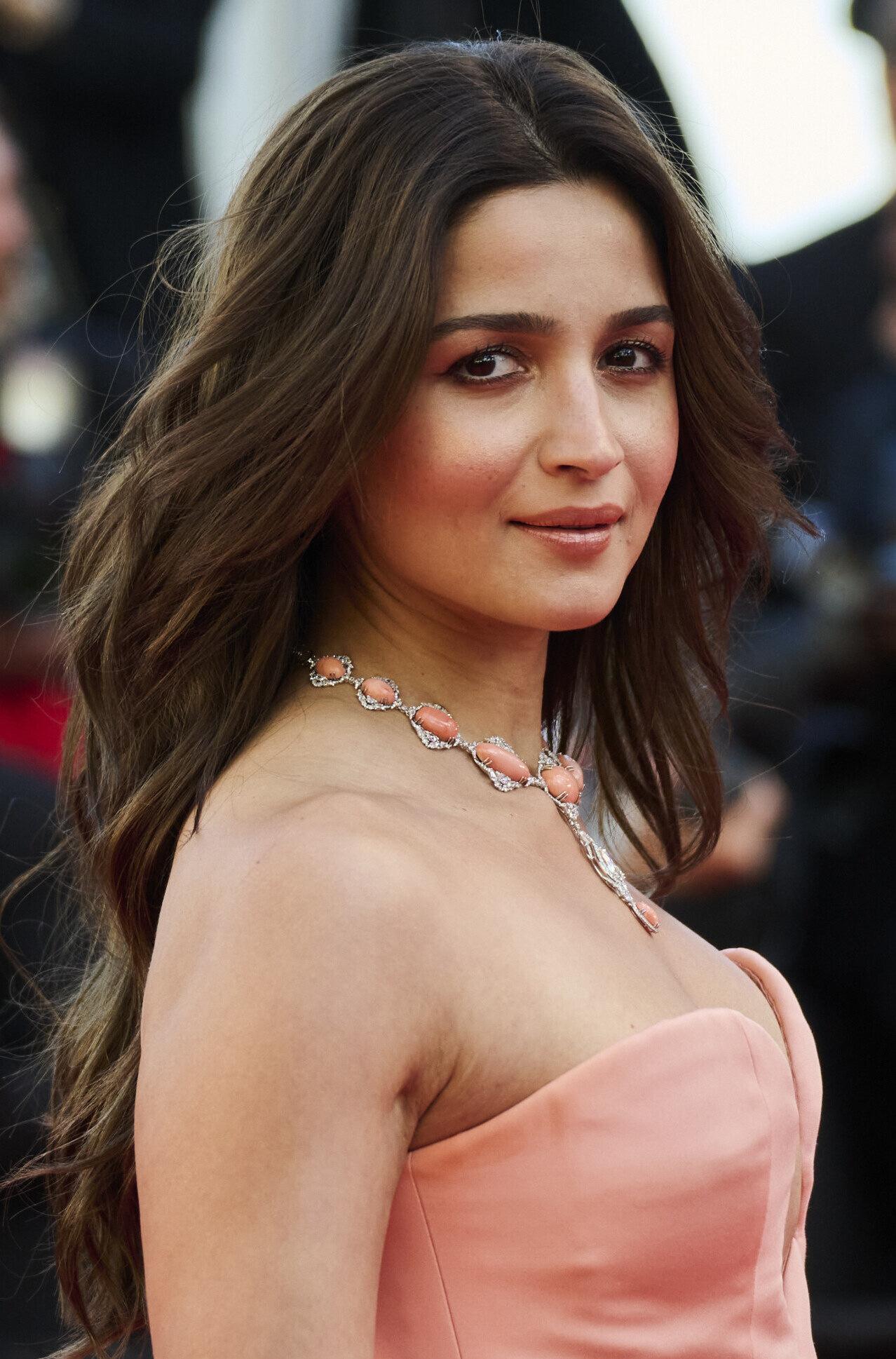
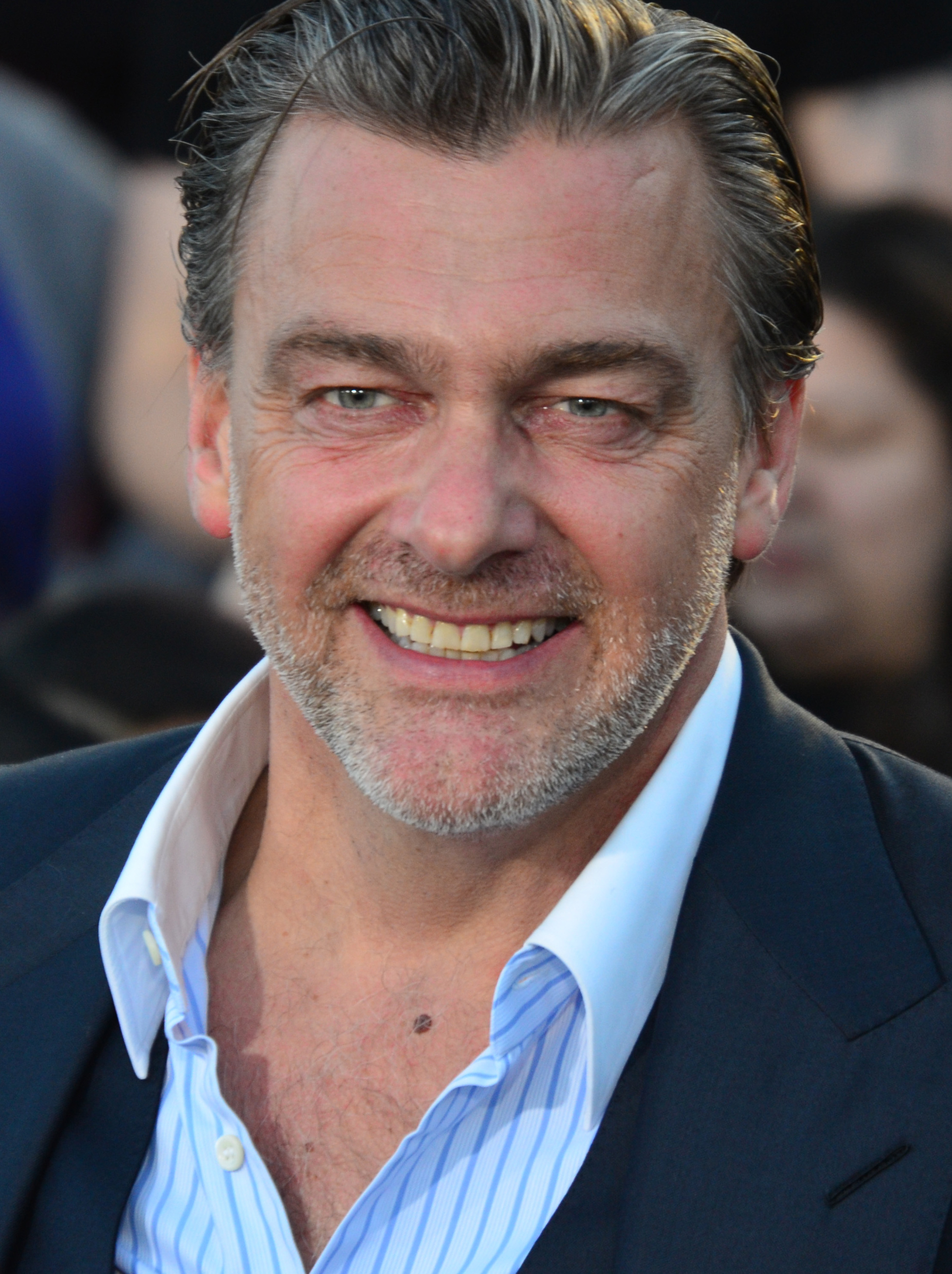
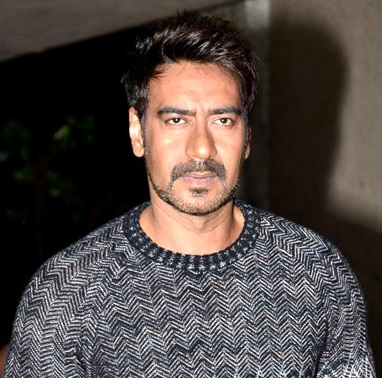
Alia Bhatt (top), Ray Stevenson (middle) and Ajay Devgn (bottom) made their debut in Telugu cinema (Tollywood) in this film.

In March 2019, Rajamouli finalised the cast. The film marks the Telugu debut of Ajay Devgn and Alia Bhatt. Bhatt was paired opposite Charan in the role of Sita, while Devgn would have an extended cameo. Tamil actor Samuthirakani was roped in to play a crucial role. British actress Daisy Edgar-Jones was signed to be paired opposite Rama Rao, however, she left the project in April 2019 citing personal reasons, which later revealed to be scheduling conflicts to Normal People. Olivia Morris was cast as her replacement in November 2019. The same month, Irish actor Ray Stevenson was cast as the lead antagonist Scott, with Alison Doody joining in to play Lady Scott. Chakri, Varun Buddhadev, Spandan Chaturvedi and Twinkle Sharma were the child artists for the film.

In an interview with Deadline Hollywood, Rama Rao said that they had carried out major research to portray their characters on screen. He was put on an 18-month training programme to get the right physical appearance. The Hans India reported in March 2019 that Devgn will appear in the second half of the film during the flashback episodes. Reports claimed that Keerthy Suresh and Priyamani were approached for a role in the film, before Shriya Saran confirmed her role opposite Devgn in June 2020. Rahul Ramakrishna, Chatrapathi Sekhar and Rajeev Kanakala are cast in other supporting roles. Bhatt joined the sets in December 2020. She learnt to speak Telugu for the film.

=== Design ===
Sabu Cyril served as the production designer for RRR. Prior to starting the first shooting schedule, the team had constructed a set at an aluminium factory located in Hyderabad, for filming an action sequence. A manduva house was constructed for the film actors and technicians. The first schedule of the film's shooting was held at the Aluminium factory set for nearly 20 days. In June 2020, it was reported that ₹18 crore (US$2.43 million) was spent for a set replicating an entire village in Gandipet, where the team planned to film the sequences in this location post-COVID-19 lockdown. A set resembling the 20th-century Delhi was recreated at the Ramoji Film City, where the team had undergone an extensive action schedule for 50 days, which involved night shoots. Another huge set was constructed by the art direction crew for a song shoot featuring Charan and Bhatt. The promotional music video for the film titled "Dosti" was filmed in July 2021, at a specially constructed set at the Annapurna Studios designed by Sabu Cyril and photographed by Dinesh Krishnan.

=== Principal photography ===
The film's launch event with a puja ceremony was held on 11 November 2018, which saw the attendance of noted personalities from the Telugu film industry, including Prabhas and Rana Daggubati, who had worked with Rajamouli in the Baahubali franchise. Principal photography of the film commenced on 19 November 2018 in Hyderabad at a specially erected set at an Aluminium factory in the location. It is the first Indian film to be shot on Arri Alexa LF and Arri Signature Prime lens. Senthil Kumar told American Cinematographer that, he "avoided the use of overt stylization such as extreme color palettes and unrealistic camera moves, in favor of a more classical cinematographic approach". The filming schedule was completed on 6 December 2018. The team took a brief break before commencing the film's second schedule on 21 January 2019 at Ramoji Film City in Hyderabad. More than 270 days were spent shooting with a single sequence - in which the two friends fight it out amid wild animals and fiery explosions - occupying a total of 65 nights. An action sequence consisting of 1000 artists was filmed during February 2019. An extensive schedule was filmed in Vadodara for 10 days in March 2019. A few scenes were also shot at Siddhpur, Gujarat. Another schedule was planned in Pune, Maharashtra, however, it was called off following Charan's injury on the sets. Rama Rao too faced a minor injury on the sets, resulting the team to take a break during the schedule. Ram Charan's introduction scene was reportedly shot for 32 days.

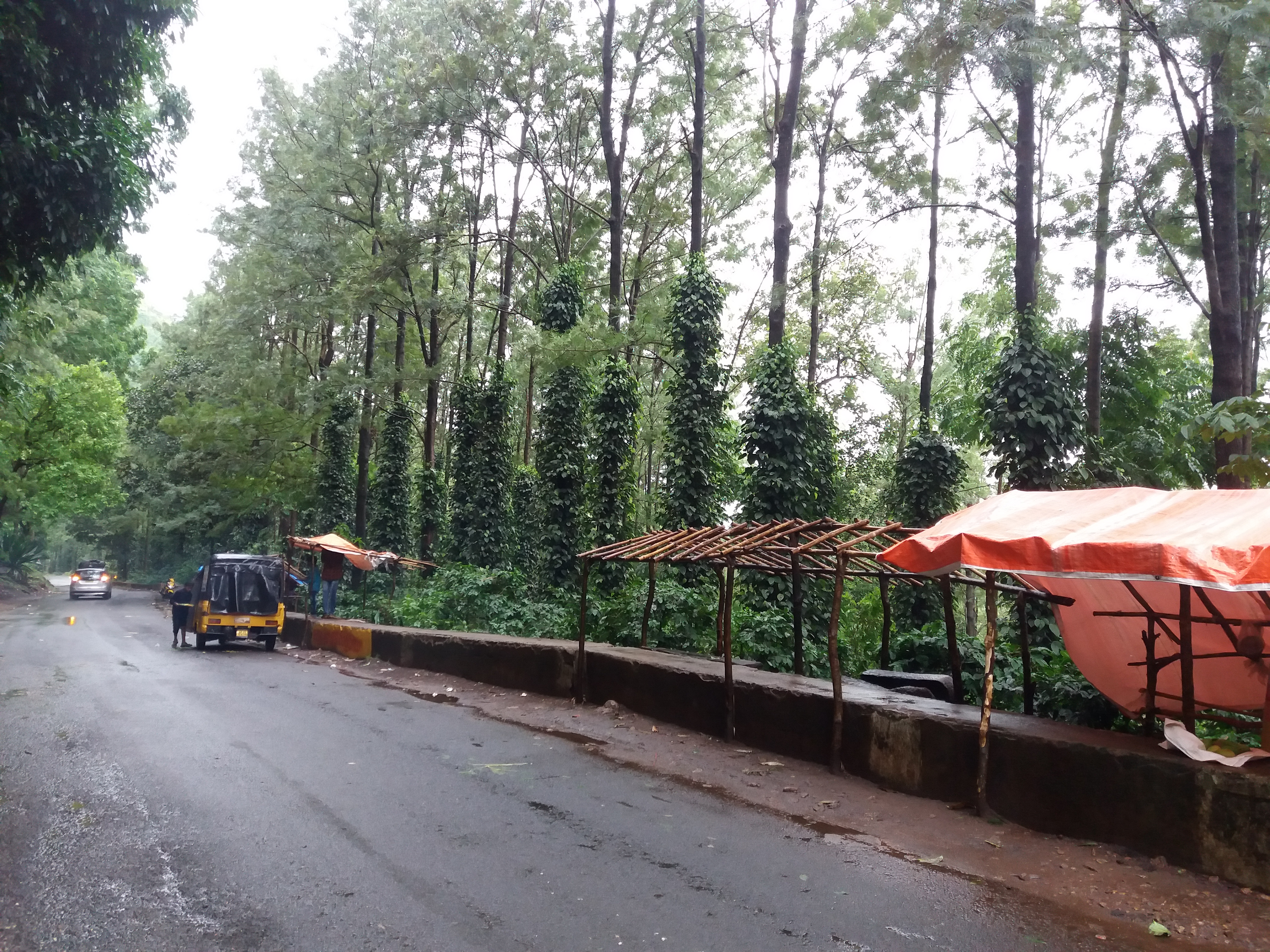
Araku Valley, where parts of the film were shot, including the opening scenes

After their recovery, an action sequence featuring Charan, Rama Rao and 2000 junior artists was shot, reportedly at a cost more than ₹45 crore (US$4.8 million). Introductory sequences of Rama Rao and Charan costed the production upwards of ₹40 crore (US$4.3 million), a sum considered higher than the total budget of many small Indian films. In August 2019, the production headed to Bulgaria to film the second schedule where the crew shot crucial scenes featuring Rama Rao. The shoot was stalled during October 2019 as Rajamouli had to attend a screening of Baahubali: The Beginning (2015) at the Royal Albert Hall in London.

In November 2019, a song featuring Rama Rao and Charan was filmed at the Ramoji Film City. The film's official social media handle tweeted that 70% of the film's shoot had been wrapped as of November. Rama Rao headed to the Modakondamma Temple forest area in the Paderu–Araku road to film for five days in December 2019. In January 2020, Charan began a week-long night shoot in the Vikarabad forest region. Ajay Devgn joined the film's shooting schedule on 21 January 2020 and wrapped his portions during February. The film was halted due to the COVID-19 pandemic in March 2020. After the governments of Andhra Pradesh and Telangana granted permission to resume film shooting during June 2020, a 2-day trial shoot was planned, but it was halted following the spike in COVID-19 cases in Hyderabad. The filming was resumed in early October 2020 following the ease of the COVID-19 lockdown in India, and Rajamouli shot for the promotional teaser for the film, titled "Ramaraju for Bheem", during this schedule. Abiding to social restrictions related to the pandemic, the production unit was accommodated in a hotel in Madhapur and were barred from coming into contact with outsiders not belonging to the production.

In late-October, the team canned night shoots for the film and stills were revealed by the official social media handles for the film under the tagline #RRRDiaries. The action sequences, which took place for 50 days, were completed by the end of November 2020. The production then moved to Mahabaleshwar to film a very brief schedule in early December 2020 The production then moved to Ramoji Film City in Hyderabad for further filming. Alia Bhatt began filming her portions in Hyderabad in December 2020, during which key scenes involving her were shot. The filming of the climax scenes began in January 2021. Action director Nick Powell choreographed a few climax war-sequences in March 2021. A special song shoot featuring Charan and Bhatt was held during the same month. Though the filming was halted again due to the second wave of COVID-19, it was resumed in June 2021. In June 2021, the makers announced that except for two songs, the filming was completed and Charan and Rama Rao had completed their dubbing work in two languages, and had completed the talkie portions for the film.

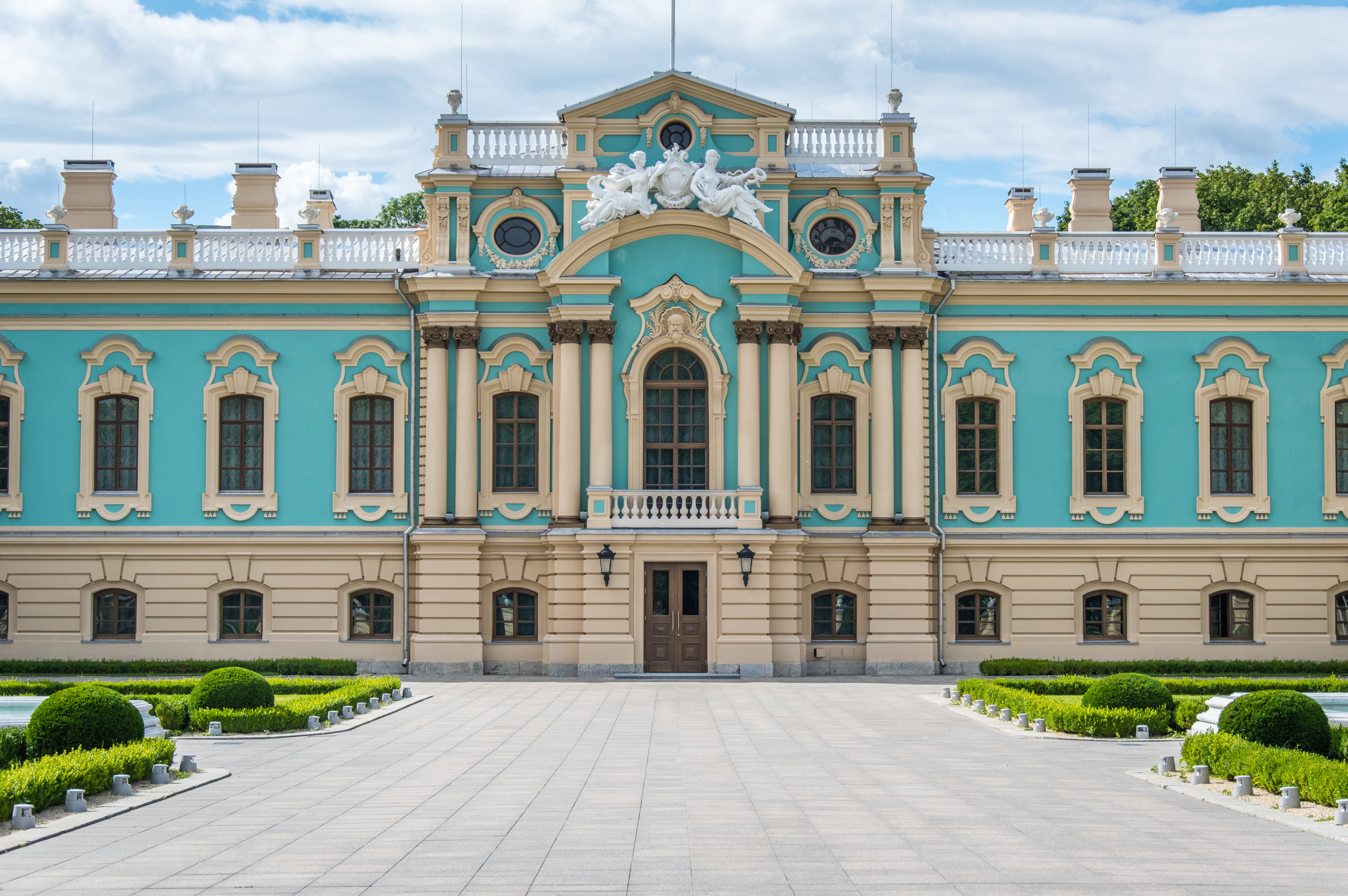
The "Naatu Naatu" song was filmed at the Mariinskyi Palace in capital Kyiv of Ukraine.

In August 2021, the final schedule of the film took place in Ukraine. The song "Naatu Naatu" was shot during the schedule at Mariinskyi Palace, Kyiv, which is the ceremonial residential palace of President of Ukraine, filming took place some months before Russia invaded Ukraine. Barring a few shots, the entire shoot was completed on 26 August 2021. In an article published in March 2022, by News18, it was reported that at least 3000 technicians have worked on RRR, while nine co-directors also contributed to the film. It took over 300 days to complete the shooting of the film. About 75 days had been allotted to film the action sequences, and 40 fighters from other countries took part in the film. At least 2500 crew people were also hired from London. Overseas locations including Netherlands was also used for shooting some important sequences.

RRR began with a budget of between ₹350 crore (US$49.7 million) and ₹400 crore (US$56.8 million) in 2019. However, the budget was overrun by around ₹150 crore (US$16 million) due to the delays caused by the COVID-19 pandemic, with the film's final budget estimated to be ₹550 crore (US$59 million), thus making RRR the most expensive Indian film at the time of its release. In March 2022, according to the producer's application to the Government of Andhra Pradesh for ticket price hikes, the film's budget was ₹336 crore (US$36 million) excluding the Goods and Services Tax and the remunerations of the director and star cast.

=== Post-production ===
Post-production of the film began simultaneously with the wrapping-up and continuation of film production. The dubbing process began during April 2020, with Rama Rao and Charan dubbing their portions for the film from their homes, and thus being the first persons to do so. Both actors gave voiceovers for each other's introduction teasers. In June 2021, the film producers reported that both actors had completed dubbing for the film. On 26 August 2021, after filming was completed, the film entered into an extensive post-production phase. With three years already invested in the film, Rajamouli's decision to spend less time in post-production compared to his other films was due to future commitments, rising production costs, and filming postponements caused by COVID-19 restrictions. The dubbing works were completed by late October 2021. Both Rama Rao and Charan dubbed their lines for four languages, namely Telugu, Hindi, Tamil and Kannada.

V. Srinivas Mohan is the visual effects supervisor of the film, along with Framestore and the Moving Picture Company (MPC), the film's principal visual effects studio. Alzahra VFX, Red Chillies VFX, NY VFXWaala, Redefine, Knack Studios, Makuta VFX, Digital Domain, Rhythm and Hues Studios, Method Studios, Rodeo FX, Technicolor VFX, Legend3D, The Third Floor, Inc, Clear Angle Studios, Halon Entertainment, 4DMax, and Cinesite, among others, are responsible for some of the other visual effects in the film. In an interview, Mohan discussed the utilisation of pre-visualization, LiDAR scanning, and light stage technology in the film. Extensive visual effects work took place for more than six months during the post-production process. The finishing work for RRR was performed at ANR Sound & Vision at Annapurna Studios, by colorist BVR Shivakumar.

The final copy of the film was ready by late November 2021, and was submitted to the Central Board of Film Certification (CBFC) that month. On 9 December 2021, the film received a U/A certificate from the Censor Board, with a finalised runtime of 187 minutes.

== Themes and influences ==
"I was interested in the coincidence of these two freedom fighters, both born in Andhra Pradesh and present-day Telangana, at the turn of the 20th century. They left their respective homes, disappeared for three-four years, and then came back to fight against the oppressors. But their modus operandi was the same. They were striking police stations, taking away the guns, arming the people, inspiring the people. Unfortunately, they both died at the hands of the British in the same way. But they never met. I thought: What if we make them meet, create a rift between them, and then make each one inspire the other?"

— S. S. Rajamouli, on the genesis of the film.

According to Rajamouli, RRR is about an "imaginary friendship between two superheroes". He has said that the bifurcation of Andhra Pradesh, his home state, also had an impact in the conception of the film. "I had this thought that Komaram Bheem is from the Telangana region and Alluri Sitarama Raju is from the Andhra region. So, if I can bring those two heroes together, it's my way of saying we are one, we are not separate," Rajamouli told Variety following the film's release.

In a press meet, Rajamouli revealed that the film is inspired by Quentin Tarantino's Inglourious Basterds (2009). After watching it he felt, "[If] we are making a fictional story, we don't need to stick to historical accuracies." He cited, "Inglourious Basterds is one of the biggest inspirations when it comes to my films, specifically RRR. I was shell shocked when Hitler dies in the film, and how the film brings it off as a big surprise." The core idea to make this film came in Rajamouli's mind from The Motorcycle Diaries (2004). He said, "The inspiration for RRR came from The Motorcycle Diaries. I was fascinated by how a character named Che transforms into a revolutionary called Guevara and have structured the characters of my protagonists around a common point, on similar lines".

Countercurrents.org's T. Navin notes

The friendship which develops between Ram and Bheem (as Akhtar) while attempting to rescue a child is one of human brotherhood. People cutting across all religions and regions are shown participating in their common fight against the Britishers. The film builds idea of love between religions, camaraderie of the struggling people and promotes the idea of inclusion.

Some viewers in India and the Western world viewed their relationship through a queer lens, arguing that they were a queer coded romantic couple on social media; however, others responded, claiming that Westerners assigning such readings had misinterpreted Indian culture and male friendships. Rajamouli reiterated that it was just a friendship, and how one should be unapologetic about showing men's friendship on screen. American filmmaker Joe Russo similarly found it to be "a really powerful story about brotherhood".

RRR borrows from India's two major Hindu mythological epics — Ramayana and Mahabharata. The two protagonists of the film, Alluri Sitarama Raju and Komaram Bheem, who are based on real-life personalities, are also modelled after their namesakes from the Hindu mythology. Rama Raju shares the qualities of the supple and skilled Rama of Ramayana while Komaram Bheem is equivalent to the muscular and immovable Bhima of Mahabharata. Like Rama Raju and Komaram Bheem, Rama and Bhima never met in mythology. The abduction of Sita, which is the central theme of Ramayana plays out in reverse in RRR, with Rama Raju being captured following a series of events. Komaram Bheem (who is also modelled after Hanuman), carries a message from Sita, and saves Rama Raju.

The Indian Express's Manoj Kumar wrote that unlike other Rajamouli's films, RRR addresses worldly matters such as "racism, shared history of freedom struggle among different communities and the need for interfaith brotherhood." An article was published by The Times of India in April 2022 writing about how pan-Indian films such as RRR are promoting violence. Speaking about the issue, writer V. Vijayendra Prasad told that RRR showcased action as per the story and era it takes place in, not violence.

Kaveree Bamzai of Open magazine writes this about Bheem's attack on the governor's palace

The animals, ranging from tigers to stags, run riot, tearing the enemy to bits. It is both a metaphor and a statement. A metaphor for the weaponisation of the Earth, a foreshadowing of climate change, and a statement on the tribal way of life in which the human apologises to the beast for taking advantage of it.

She noted that the film's layered storytelling emphasising the two conflicting ways in which Ram and Bheem fight for India's freedom is a theme that is appropriate to revisit in the nation's 75th year post-independence. She also notes,

The fight against the British is shown to be as plural as the actual freedom struggle was. Bheem, in fact, spends much of the movie disguised as a Muslim mechanic, Akhtar, and is given shelter by a family in Delhi. There is no pandering to the establishment in the movie, a hallmark of most movies emerging out of Bollywood currently.

Katie Rife of Polygon in her review of the film, felt that — betrayal, loyalty and legacy are the major themes of the film. Also, she opined that "RRR is relatively light on music and romance, devoting much of its screen time to visual spectacle, gonzo action, and patriotic zeal. The dynamic between Bheem and Raju has shades of the macho bromance of John Woo's 1980s movies, until the film transforms into a superhero team-up". MensXP in their article praising Rajamouli, opined that strong representation of heroism in the film was one of the key reasons for the film's success.

== Music ==
Rajamouli's older cousin and regular collaborator M. M. Keeravani composed the score and the soundtrack of the film. The audio rights of the film were purchased for ₹25 crore (US$2.7 million), by Lahari Music and T-Series, which was a record price for a South Indian album. Lahari Music distributed the soundtrack in Telugu, Tamil, Kannada and Malayalam versions, whereas the Hindi version soundtrack is marketed by T-Series.

RRR became the second non-English language film to be screened at the Royal Albert Hall in London, receiving a standing ovation. The event featured a live performance of the film's score alongside the screening of the epic action film. A special Q&A session also took place on stage conducted by BBC Radio broadcaster and film critic Ashanti Omkar, with director S.S. Rajamouli, composer M.M. Keeravani, and lead actors N.T. Rama Rao Jr. and Ram Charan in attendance. The first non-English film to be screened at the venue was Baahubali: The Beginning, which was also directed by S.S. Rajamouli with the score composed by M.M. Keeravani.

== Marketing ==
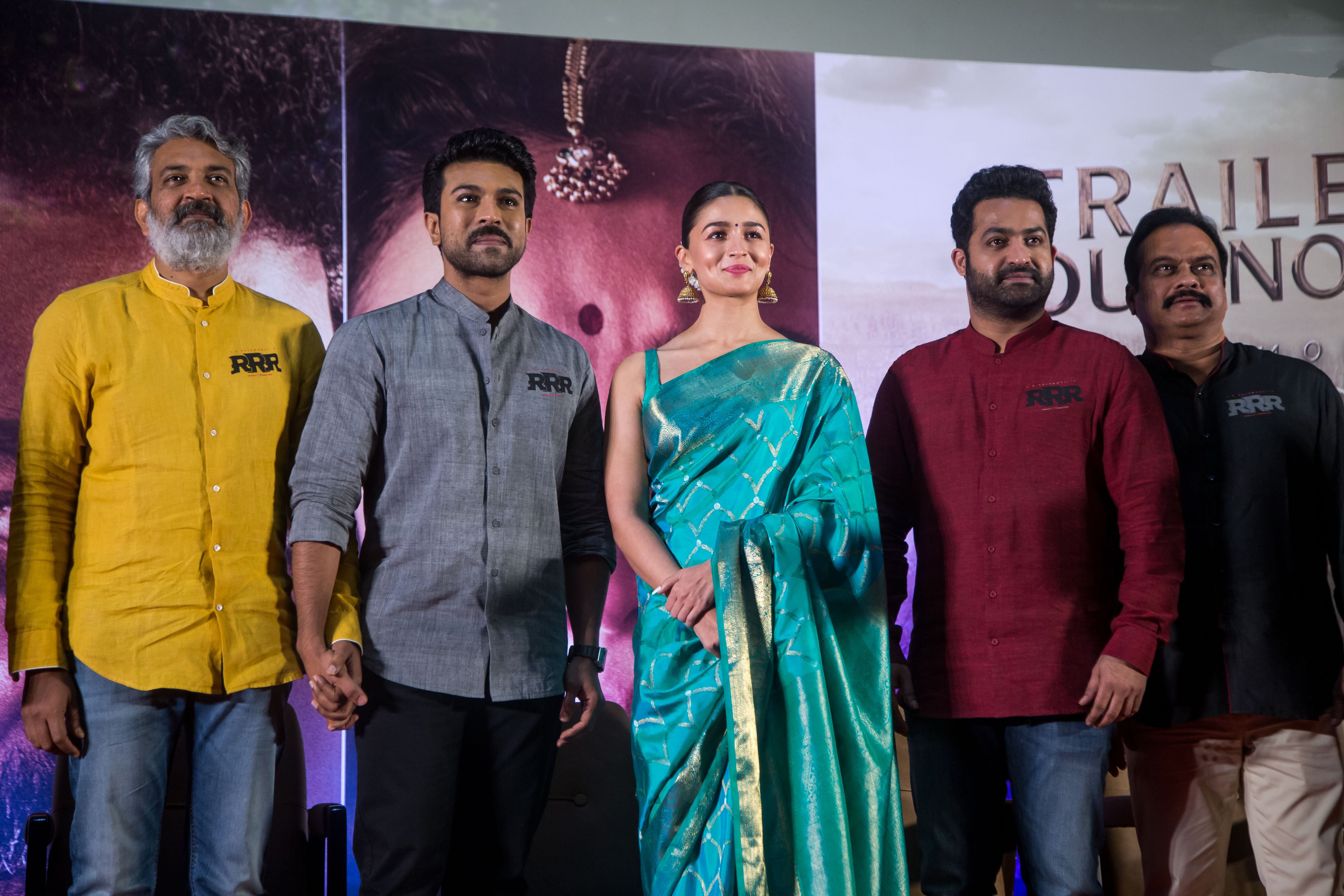
Left to right: Rajamouli, Charan, Bhatt, Rama Rao and Danayya at the trailer launch event of the film's Tamil version in Chennai, Tamil Nadu.

The filmmakers invited fans to enter a naming contest by submitting their suggestions for the title of RRR in various languages. In 25 March 2020, the titles for RRR in various versions were revealed: Raudraṁ Raṇaṁ Rudhiraṁ in Telugu, Rattam Raṇam Rauttiram in Tamil, Raudra Raṇa Rudhira in Kannada, Rudhiram Raṇam Raudhram in Malayalam (all of which translate to 'Rage, War, Blood') and Rise Roar Revolt in the Hindi version.

The official social media handle for the film was launched during the film's announcement. During the second wave of COVID-19, the movie crew converted the official handle into a COVID-19 helpline offering information regarding the availability of emergency services in Telugu-speaking states as well as safety tips. In October 2021, PVR Cinemas announced that more than 850 of its screens would be re-branded as "PVRRR" until the release and run of the film. That same month, Rajamouli and the PVR team unveiled the company's re-branded logo. After the song "Naatu Naatu" was released in November 2021, the hook step choreographed by Prem Rakshith and performed by Charan and Rama Rao in the music video went viral. Many people have recreated the hook step by recording themselves dancing to the song and posting their videos on social media.

In 22 October 2020, a teaser trailer was released, titled "Ramaraju for Bheem", coinciding with Komaram Bheem's 119th birth anniversary. A controversy was sparked over portrayal of Bheem's character. In the video, Rama Rao was seen wearing a skull cap, applying kohl on to his eyes and appearing dressed as a Muslim man. Members from the tribal community of Adilabad and a few netizens have opposed this representation of an Adivasi leader from the Gond tribe, as a Muslim man. In November 2020, during a by-election campaign at Dubbaka, Bharatiya Janata Party's Telangana president Bandi Sanjay Kumar warned Rajamouli, and threatened that his cadre will vandalise the theatres and his properties, if he intended to hurt the sentiments of Hindus. Later, in an interview with Film Companion's Anupama Chopra in July 2021, writer Vijayendra Prasad clarified about the Bheem's appearance in the film, saying, "He is being [hunted] by the British Raj. So, he is trying to escape the people from British police. So, what is the best camouflage? Simple. He is playing a Muslim boy in that time so that he won't be [caught]." The film's behind-the-scenes video, titled "Roar of RRR", was released on 15 July 2021.

The official trailer was initially scheduled to be released on 3 December 2021, but was postponed and released on 9 December 2021 in five languages, including Telugu. Trailer launch events were held for the five versions of the film in Mumbai (Hindi), Bangalore (Kannada) and Hyderabad (Telugu). Reviewing the trailer, The Times of India cited it as "Goosebumps overloaded". Praising the trailer cut, The Hindu stated "SS Rajamouli promises another epic for the ages". Praising Rajamouli's work, Hindustan Times called it "an epic theatrical experience". Roktim Rajpal of Deccan Herald noted that the film has universal storyline and also felt that it is a "perfect multi-starrer" while comparing it with 1957 epic film Mayabazar.

In 19 December 2021, a prerelease event was held at Gurukul Ground near Film City in Mumbai to promote the film's Hindi version. Hosted by Karan Johar, the team invited Salman Khan as the chief guest. The television streaming rights for the event were acquired by Zee Network. It was telecasted on Zee TV, Zee Cinema and Zee Cinemalu on 31 December 2021. The next day, it was made available on YouTube. To promote the film's Tamil version, a prerelease event was held on 27 December 2021 at Chennai Trade Centre, Chennai. Udhayanidhi Stalin and Sivakarthikeyan were the chief guests of the event. In 29 December 2021, the team took part in the Malayalam version's prerelease event held at Thiruvananthapuram, Kerala. Tovino Thomas was the chief guest of the event. Soon after, the film's release and promotional activities were postponed. The film producers faced a loss of between ₹18 crore (US$1.9 million)–₹20 crore (US$2.1 million) in promotions, as the film's release was delayed again due to COVID-19.

After the film's final release date was announced in late-January 2022, promotions and marketing of the film were restarted. At first, a music video "Etthara Jenda" (in Telugu) was released as RRR Celebration Anthem on 14 March 2022. The song featured Rama Rao, Ram Charan and Alia Bhatt praising the freedom fighters from various regions of India. According to The Times of India, Bhuvan Bam was hired to be part of film's promotions in late 2021. Later, in March 2022 a video was released on Bam's YouTube channel, in which he interviewed Rajamouli, Rama Rao and Ram Charan as part of his show Titu Talks.

Soon after, the team has planned a promotional tour across nine cities on six days starting from 18 March 2022 to 23 March 2022. On the first day of the tour, the team including Rajamouli, Rama Rao and Ram Charan headed to Dubai to participate in an event held at the Dubai Exhibition Centre in the Indian Pavilon (as part of the Expo 2020). The next day, the team returned to India and attended a press conference in Bangalore. On the same day, to promote the Telugu and Kannada versions of the film, a prerelease event was held at Agalagurki in Chikkaballapura district of Karnataka. It was organised by the film's Karnataka distribution company KVN Productions. Chief minister of Karnataka Basavaraj Bommai was the chief guest of the event. The other guests of the event were Shiva Rajkumar and K. Sudhakar (MLA of Chikballapur and Health minister of Karnataka). The following day, the team toured Baroda and Delhi. At first, the team visited Statue of Unity making it the first film to visit for promotions. The same day, an event was held by film's Hindi distributor Jayantilal Gada, at the Imperial Hotel in New Delhi where the cast and crew interacted with the media and fans. Aamir Khan was the chief guest of the event. On the fifth day, the team toured Kolkata and Varanasi. The team visited the Howrah Bridge in Kolkata and interacted with the local media to promote their film in the region, followed by performing the Ganga aarti in Varanasi.

== Release ==
=== Theatrical ===
RRR was scheduled to have special premieres across India and the United States on 24 March 2022, before its worldwide theatrical release on 25 March. Earlier, it was scheduled to be theatrically released on 30 July 2020. However, in February 2020, the release date was revised to 8 January 2021, a week prior to the Sankranthi festival (14 January 2021). Due to the COVID-19 pandemic lockdown, which disrupted production, the film's release was put on hold. Rajamouli said that the new release date would be confirmed after the completion of shooting. On the eve of Republic Day (25 January 2021), a 13 October 2021 release date, coinciding with the eve of Dusshera weekend, was announced. The release date was again deferred, citing theatrical restrictions across the world due to the second wave of COVID-19 and its aftermath.

In early October 2021, the theatrical release date was changed to 7 January 2022, ahead of the Sankranthi festival. However, a week before the release, the film producers announced that the film's release would be postponed indefinitely due to the increasing number of COVID-19 cases, fuelled by the SARS-CoV-2 Omicron variant. In mid-January, two tentative release dates were announced pending the pandemic situation: 18 March 2022 and 28 April 2022. Later, the producers finalised a 25 March 2022 release date. The film was intended to be released in Telugu along with the dubbed versions in Hindi, Tamil, Malayalam, Kannada, and other Indian and foreign languages in 2D, 3D and IMAX formats. It is the first Indian film to be released in Dolby Cinema format.

In January 2022, a public interest litigation (PIL) was filed in the Telangana High Court to restrain the film for being released, alleging that the film distorts the history of Alluri Sita Rama Raju and Komaram Bheem. The High Court quashed the petition in March, observing that the film did not tarnish the reputation of the two revolutionaries as claimed.

Following political and film industry backlash after reducing ticket prices last year, Chief minister of Andhra Pradesh Y. S. Jagan Mohan Reddy issued a ticket price hike in Andhra Pradesh in mid-March 2022. As per Cinematography Minister Perni Venkataramaiah, the filmmakers received government approval to increase ticket prices by ₹75 (80¢ US) during the first ten days after the film's 25 March release.

RRR became the first film to be screened in Jammu and Kashmir, after the re-opening of cinemas in September 2022, which were closed in 1990s following the spread of terrorism and further incidents.

The original Telugu version was released on 21 October 2022 in Japan. It was released by Keizo Kabata's Twin Company in 209 screens and 31 IMAX screens across 44 cities and prefectures, the widest release for an Indian film in the country. The film's Japanese-language dubbed version was released in Japan on 28 July 2023.

Shortly before Academy Awards nominees were announced, distributor Variance Films announced RRR would return to American cinemas for a limited run from 3 March 2023.

=== Screenings and statistics ===
In November 2021, The Times of India reported that RRR would premiere on over 10,000 screens worldwide, the "highest for an Indian film". In India, the film was estimated to show on over 2,300 screens, with the Telugu version premiering on over 1,000 screens. The Hindi version was reported to showcase on over 793 screens and the Tamil version on over 291 screens. The Kannada and Malayalam-dubbed versions were scheduled for 66 and 62 screens, respectively. The film was slated to screen at over 1,150 locations in the United States in around 3,000 theatres and 1,000-odd multiplexes across the country, which was claimed to be a record for an Indian film.

The film was planned to be released in IMAX, 3D and Dolby Cinema. According to trade sources, the film would screen in over 21 IMAX screens in India and over 100 IMAX theatres overseas, a first for an Indian film.

In 1 June 2022, RRR was screened in over 100 theatres across the United States for a one night event called "#encoRRRe". Speaking to Deadline Hollywood, Dylan Marchetti of Variance Films said that "With more than 250 films coming out of India annually, RRR could be a gateway drug". In his review of the film Nashville Scene's Jason Shawhan wrote about the event that "the nationwide encore of RRR is American audiences reaching with outstretched arms to something so exciting and rock-solid entertaining that its success already happened without insular traditional media even mentioning it. This isn't America dipping a toe in Indian cinema — it's a victory lap".

In June 2022, London-based Prince Charles Cinema announced that it will re-release the film on popular demand on 3, 5, and 29 July and 8 August 2022, with additional screenings that September. RRR was screened at the TCL Chinese Theatre on 30 September 2022 in IMAX as part of "From Tollywood to Hollywood: The Spectacle & Majesty of S.S. Rajamouli" program of 10th Beyond Festival organised by American Cinematheque in partnership with IMAX, Variance Films, Potentate Films and the Indian Film Festival of Los Angeles.

RRR was screened at the 53rd International Film Festival of India under the Indian panorama section, in November 2022. In 21 October 2026, this film was screened at the 50th São Paulo International Film Festival.

RRR has been subtitled into 15 different languages.

=== Distribution ===
Originally, the film made a prerelease earning of ₹400 crore (US$43 million), but the revised prerelease deal was later revealed to be ₹890 crore (US$95 million). The domestic theatrical rights in the Andhra Pradesh and Telangana regions were reported to be under ₹165 crore (US$18 million). Lyca Productions acquired the film's theatrical distribution rights from Tamil Nadu for ₹45 crore (US$4.8 million). The following month, Pen Studios acquired the theatrical rights for North India under the Pen Marudhar Entertainment banner, in addition to electronic, satellite and digital rights for all language versions. The deal for the North Indian theatrical release rights were reported to be ₹140 crore (US$15 million). KVN Productions acquired the film's theatrical distribution rights from Karnataka, The Kerala theatrical rights were acquired by Shibu Thameens, with Riya Shibu presenting the film under the HR Studios banner. The Arab world theatrical rights were sold to Phars Films for ₹70 crore (US$7.5 million). Dreamz Entertainment distributed the film in United Kingdom and Ireland. Shreyas Media Group's film distribution company Good Cinema Group has acquired the distribution rights for the entire African continent.

=== Home media ===
In May 2021, Pen Studios announced that the film's digital rights for Telugu, Tamil, Malayalam and Kannada versions are acquired by ZEE5 while Hindi, English, Portuguese, Korean, Turkish and Spanish versions are acquired by Netflix. Zee Network acquired the satellite rights of the Hindi version and Star India Network acquired the satellite rights of the film's Telugu, Tamil, Malayalam, and Kannada versions. The combined deal of post-theatrical streaming and satellite rights were reported to be in the region of ₹325 crore (US$35 million). The film started streaming on ZEE5 from 20 May 2022 in Telugu, Tamil, Malayalam and Kannada languages while the Hindi version was released on the same day on Netflix.

The film was released on physical media with Ultra HD Blu-ray, Blu-ray versions in Japan on 21 October 2024.

== Reception ==
RRR received universal critical acclaim from both Indian and Western critics who praised its screenwriting, direction, action sequences, VFX, characterisation, cast performances and musical numbers.

On the review aggregator website Rotten Tomatoes, 96% of 104 critics' reviews are positive. The website's consensus reads: "Intoxicatingly over the top, RRR pulls out all the stops to make the absolute most of its 187-minute runtime." Metacritic, which uses a weighted average, assigned the film a score of 83 out of 100, based on 17 critics, indicating "universal acclaim". In June 2022, the film was ranked 86th globally in the list of Rotten Tomatoes' "The 100 Best Movies 3 hours or Longer", making it the third Indian film to be on the list after Lagaan (12th) and Gangs of Wasseypur (66th). USA Today ranked the film #1 in their list of "Best Movies of 2022 so far" in June of the same year.

=== India ===
Taran Adarsh of Bollywood Hungama gave the film a rating of 4/5 and termed RRR as a solid entertainer that "doesn't make you restless, despite a marathon run time. The screenplay is wonderfully constructed, the twists and turns are attention grabbing and the nail-biting episodes as well as superbly executed action." Roktim Rajpal of Deccan Herald gave the film a rating of 4/5 and wrote, "The action-packed climax again hits the right notes as the visuals do the talking, the hallmark of good storytelling". Neeshita Nyayapati of The Times of India gave the film a rating of 3.5/5 and wrote, "RRR is not perfection by any means (despite Rajamouli's best efforts) because after the way he pulls off certain scenes, you wonder if he could've done a better job in certain others. But watch this one this weekend if you've been pining for a good action packed drama".

Himesh Mankad of Pinkvilla gave the film a rating of 3.5/5 and wrote, "RRR has the best action sequences to offer in an Indian film with an unimaginable interval block and a roaring finale." Janani K of India Today gave the film a rating of 3.5/5 and wrote, "RRR is a terrific film with brilliant performances and amazing set-pieces." A reviewer from Deccan Chronicle gave the film a rating of 3.5/5 and wrote, "RRR is a fantastic film that's meant for the big screen." Latha Srinivasan of Firstpost gave the film a rating of 3.5/5 and wrote, "Ram Charan and Jr NTR's offscreen friendship and camaraderie seep into their onscreen performances, and the organic transformation from strangers to brothers-in-arms has been captured beautifully." Sowmya Rajendran of The News Minute gave the film a rating of 3.5/5 and wrote, "RRR is just the kind of visual treat that will bring people back to theatres." Bharathi Pradhan of Lehren gave the film a rating of 3.5/5 and wrote, "SSR rescues his adventure with a smorgasbord of skilfully choreographed, shot and performed action pieces that have you cheering lustily, the temporary boredom soon forgotten."

Shubhra Gupta of The Indian Express gave the film a rating of 3.5/5 and wrote, "The film casts not just one super-star, but two of them – Jr NTR and Ram Charan. The biggest super-star among them all is SS Rajamouli and the audience also saved the loudest 'taalis' (claps) for him." Prateek Sur of Outlook India gave the film a rating of 3.5/5 and wrote, "The film's grand representation is what makes this a Must Watch." Stutee Ghosh of The Quint gave the film a rating of 3/5 and wrote, "Parts of RRR seem Ridiculous and Reductive it's also absolutely Ravishing and for that it deserves to be seen and enjoyed." Rahul Devulapalli of The Week gave the film a rating of 3/5 and wrote, "Visually stunning action sequences, exceptionally synchronised dance moves stand out."

Saibal Chatterjee of NDTV gave the film a rating of 2/5 and wrote, "The film rings hollow because it never pauses for breath and does not grant its two male protagonists anything akin to recognizable human qualities although they do constantly harp on love and longing." Sukanya Verma of Rediff gave the film a rating of 2/5 and wrote, "A copious amount of blood, beating, crying, saving, sacrificing, nationalism fills up its staggering three hours running time. Emotions run sky high, but you feel nothing."

=== International ===
Calling RRR "bigger than Ben-Hur", Deadline Hollywood's Stephanie Bunbury wrote: "RRR is one action crescendo after another, never dull but not exhausting either." In her review for Polygon, Katie Rife stated: "RRR is a busy movie, full of kinetic camerawork, bustling crowd scenes, elaborate set design, expensive-looking CGI, and loud sound effects." Siddhant Adlakha of IndieWire praised Rajamouli's work, M. M. Keeravani's music and acting performances of lead actors. He further wrote that RRR outshines even the director's previous venture Baahubali.

Reviewing the film for The Austin Chronicle, Josh Hurtado called RRR a "bromantic action nirvana". Hurtado stated that Rajamouli turned a "patriotic fantasy" into an "incredibly entertaining reality for fans of big action, big emotions, and big laughs." Joe Leydon in his review for Variety felt RRR was "bigger-than-life and bolder-than-mainstream action-adventure epic." Nicolas Rapold of The New York Times stated: "Rajamouli shoots the film's action with hallucinogenic fervor, supercharging scenes with a shimmering brand of extended slow-motion and C.G.I. that feels less 'generated' than unleashed." Screen International's Tara Judah wrote that RRR was "big, bold and bombastic", feeling the film was "big screen entertainment at its best". Writing for Rolling Stone, David Fear cited the film as "best and most revolutionary of 2022". He further wrote that "RRR is about the movies: the thrill of watching stories told at larger-than-life levels, the joy of watching stars collide, the effort of rendering lavish mythologies at whatever the digital equivalent of 24 frames per second is, the sensation of seeing manufactured movement via gleefully conspicuous special effects bump up against genuine physical effort." Praising the dance number "Naatu Naatu", he stated—"Seriously, the 'Desi Naach' dance sequence feels like a Gene Kelly number dialled up to superhuman levels."

Calling it a "dudes rock movie" Hannah Kinney-Kobre of Pittsburgh City Paper compared RRR with American English-language films and wrote that "the politics that power American blockbusters are milquetoast and/or incomprehensible – the only thing that justifies their plots is the studio executive's emphasis on recognizable intellectual property as a way to drive up box office totals. If our system can only produce movies that refuse to make the most of their astronomical budgets, why not look elsewhere? RRR is a good place to start." Richard Brody of The New Yorker felt that the film is "of shortcuts and elisions no less relentless than those of American superhero or superstar vehicles, but Rajamouli is an artist of a distinctive temperament and talent". On a final note, he further wrote "The movie's powerful sense of revolutionary virtue and collective purpose yields to nationalistic pride that's danced and sung with uninhibited joy". Nashville Scene's Jason Shawhan opined that "RRR, in addition to being a historical epic, political drama, action spectacle and bromantic telenovela, is a film that engages with history on its own terms. This isn't a case of Tollywood aiming for Western wallets". In his review of the film, The Atlantic's David Sims stated: "RRR serves as a reminder of how much modern action usually follows a formula. If wonder is to be consistently found on the big screen, then Hollywood has plenty of new lessons to learn from its best competitor." Praising the film, American screenwriter C. Robert Cargill called it a "craziest, most sincere, weirdest blockbuster".

Praising the film's direction and action sequences, The Globe and Mail's Aparita Bhandari opined that the officers of the British Raj are shown as caricatures, which does not add depth to the narrative. There is very little character development, or social or historical context. She further wrote "The female characters barely have a role to play, despite the fact that one of Indian cinema's leading actresses Alia Bhatt plays Raju's fiancée." Collider''s Chase Hutchinson stated—"An unrelenting ride of a film that makes blockbusters such as Top Gun: Maverick look like child's play and leaves whatever is happening in Jurassic World Dominion in its dust, S.S. Rajamouli's action musical epic RRR is what cinema can only hope to aspire to." Calling it "the craziest movie of the year", Adam Graham of The Detroit News further stated that "RRR's breakout is significant though, and it's the kind of accessible, crossover success story that brings more eyes to different cultures, styles and voices across the globe. Even its subtext is winning favor: the supercharged bromance at the center of the film has been celebrated by some who see Raju and Bheem as gay superheroes acting out a love affair bubbling just below the surface of all those explosions."

A critic writing for Israeli newspaper Haaretz praised Rajamouli's screenplay and his vision to make the film. They further compared RRR with Hollywood films and opined that it is truly an "entertaining film". Comic Book Resources cited it as the "best blockbuster of 2022" and felt that the film "gives Western audiences the chance to experience something new, the biggest and best of Indian cinema". In an article published by The Irish Times, Donald Clarke stated that RRR is "one of the year's unstoppable cultural phenomena". Matt Patches of Polygon and Wes Greene of Slant Magazine named the "Naatu Naatu" musical sequence as one of the best movie scenes of 2022.

In an article published by Screen Rant, Mark Donaldson wrote that "RRR's portrayal of the racism and oppression of colonialism makes it vital viewing for Western audiences that are interrogating their own countries' troubling colonial pasts." Conversely, British historian Robert Tombs strongly criticized the film in an opinion piece published by The Spectator, finding its depiction of the British Raj inaccurate and offensive, and the portrayal of the Governor and his wife "unusually nasty and at the same time amazingly silly". Tombs stated that depicting British officials and soldiers as "casually committing crimes" in India during the 1920s was "a sign of absolute ignorance or of deliberate dishonesty", since at that time the British ruled India essentially through Indian officials and acts of violence had become infrequent. According to Tombs, the film's "facile anti-imperialism" says more about contemporary Indian nationalism than about the era it purports to depict.

In June 2025, IndieWire ranked the film at number 75 on its list of "The 100 Best Movies of the 2020s (So Far)". In July 2025, it was one of the films voted for the "Readers' Choice" edition of The New York Times' list of "The 100 Best Movies of the 21st Century," finishing at number 225.

=== International filmmakers ===
RRR received widespread appreciation from international filmmakers and actors, particularly in Hollywood. It has been recognised as a crossover film from India to the US, and has been compared to Crouching Tiger, Hidden Dragon (2000). Filmmaker Steven Spielberg praised the film, stating, "I couldn't believe my eyes – it was like eye candy...it was extraordinary to look at and experience." James Cameron praising the screenplay, direction and music direction of the film, said that he liked RRR so much that he watched it twice.

J. J. Abrams said that he loved the ‘fever dream madness’ of RRR as he introduced Rajamouli at Los Angeles' Chinese Theatre. Edgar Wright said that RRR was "an absolute blast" and said it was, "the only film I have ever seen where the intermission card itself got a round of applause." Christopher Miller praised RRR, describing it as "like Michael Bay and Baz Luhrmann and Stephen Chow teamed up to make a movie. It was 3 hours long but it could have been 4 hours and I would’ve still enjoyed it." Adam McKay publicly expressed support to RRR for the Oscar awards race. Filmmaker James Gunn said that he "totally dug (RRR)."

The Russo brothers have publicly expressed their appreciation for RRR and Rajamouli. Joe Russo mentioned, "I've seen RRR, and it's amazing." He further mentioned, "What I think is so amazing about [RRR] is the emotion it evokes, combined with the spectacle." Scott Derrickson tweeted, "to celebrate my birthday last night, my wife, kids and I watched @RRRMovie — what an awesomely outrageous roller coaster of a movie. Loved it." Joe Dante called RRR a brutal portrait that depicts the horrors of British colonisation and said that, "I bet you’ve never seen anything quite like it". Jason Blum expressed his appreciation for the movie & said that RRR could win Best Picture Oscar 2023. Daniel Kwan lauded the film, saying, "While a lot of the blockbusters we're making in the States tend to have self aware, cheeky characters trapped in self-serious filmmaking, RRR was all heart-on-its-sleeve sincerity wrapped up in the most ridiculous over the top execution. So much to love."

== Box office ==
RRR is estimated to have grossed ₹1,300 crore worldwide. During its theatrical run, RRR became the third highest-grossing Indian film, the second highest-grossing Telugu film, and the highest-grossing film in Andhra Pradesh and Telangana, surpassing Rajamouli's previous film Baahubali 2: The Conclusion (2017). KGF: Chapter 2, which released three weeks later, surpassed RRR's worldwide and India gross figures, However, after becoming a major hit in Japan and the United States, RRR went on to set new box office records. As of 26 July 2022, RRR grossed over ₹1,125.9 crore (US$120 million) worldwide, with around ₹396 crore (equivalent to ₹458 crore or US$49 million in 2026) coming from the states of Andhra Pradesh and Telangana. RRR grossed ₹83.40 crore from Karnataka, ₹77.25 crore from Tamil Nadu, ₹25.5 crore from Kerala, ₹326 crore from the Hindi Belt, ₹18.20 crore from the rest of India, and ₹206 crore from the overseas. The film amassed distributors' share of ₹613 crore as opposed to the break-even point of ₹451 crore, earning a profit of ₹160 crore from the theatrical revenue.

Worldwide box office
Territory	Gross revenue	Footfalls (est.)	Ref
India	₹894 crore	45,000,000	
Overseas	US$47,100,000	6,000,000	
Australia	A$3,606,267	?	
European Union	?	36,130	
Japan	¥2,420,000,000 (US$14,503,399 / ₹139.79 crore)	1,550,000	
New Zealand	NZ$469,769	?	
Russia	US$34,511	7,700	
United Arab Emirates	US$2,981,365	?	
United Kingdom	£976,762 (US$1,174,302)	128,085	
United States	US$15,156,051	800,000	
Worldwide	₹1,300−1,387 crore	49,000,000	

Taran Adarsh reported that the film had a worldwide gross of ₹223 crore (US$24 million) on its opening day. The Times of India mentioned that the film collected ₹240 crore (US$26 million) on its opening day worldwide, setting the record for the highest first day total earned by an Indian film. This record was previously held by Rajamouli's Baahubali 2.

In its opening weekend, it grossed ₹490.9 crore (US$52 million) worldwide, making it the second biggest opening weekend for an Indian film after Baahubali 2. RRR also stood as the top grosser at the global box office during the weekend of 25–27 March 2022. According to data from Screen Australia, the film collected A$2.43 million in its debut week from 133 centers. ABC Australia reported that it is a big debut at the Aussie box office for an Indian film and a non-English language film. RRR's Hindi version domestic weekend collected a net of ₹74.5 crore (US$8.0 million), slightly lower than the post-pandemic record held by Sooryavanshi (2021) in the Hindi film market.

In its first week, RRR grossed ₹696.5 crore (US$74 million) worldwide, of which ₹270.2 crore (US$29 million) is grossed in its home territory of Andhra Pradesh and Telangana. The film grossed ₹877.5 crore (US$94 million) worldwide in 10 days. The same day, the film entered into profit zone with a distributors' share of ₹497.4 crore (US$53 million) by reaching its break even point of ₹451 crore (US$48 million). RRR also became the first film to collect a distributor share over ₹100 crore (US$11 million) in the Nizam territory (Telangana). RRR's Hindi dubbed version netted over ₹200 crore (US$21 million) in India in 13 days, making the second dubbed film to do so after Baahubali 2.

RRR reached the ₹1,000 crore (US$110 million) gross mark in 16 days of its run thus entering 1000 Crore Club and becoming the third highest-grossing Indian film after Dangal and Baahubali 2. During this period, the film grossed ₹382 crore (US$41 million) in Andhra Pradesh and Telangana. In the United States, the film grossed over US$13 million, becoming the second highest-grossing Indian film in US after Baahubali 2. It also emerged as the highest-grossing Indian film in Australia with a gross of over AU$3.36 million. RRR also holds the record for the highest collection in a single screen for any Telugu film, grossing over ₹5 crore (US$530,000) in Sudarshan 35 mm, Hyderabad. In mid-May 2022, Los Angeles Times reported that the film grossed US$14.5 million in the United States. Thus, making it the 31st highest-grossing film in the United States of the year. In the opening weekend, the film debuted at no.2 at the United Kingdom box-office with a total gross of £650,204.

According to Gulf News, the film collected a total gross of US$4.3 million in the Middle East from the 10 days of its theatrical run – US$2.568 million (Dh9.5 million) from United Arab Emirates, US$500,000 from Qatar, US$378,468 from Kuwait and US$290,118 from Saudi Arabia. It was also reported that the film clocked in 230,676 admissions in the same period.

The film was re-released several times since its original release. It has collected a total gross of $21,000 (₹17 lakh) from its release in TCL Chinese Theatre on 30 September 2022. Thus, its total re-release gross earnings became $221,156.

The film premiered in Japan on 21 October 2022 and it has collected a gross of ¥73 million (₹4.07 crore) in its opening weekend, the highest for an Indian film. Thus, it has opened at the tenth position in that week. After the eighth weekend the film collected a total gross of ¥403 million (₹24.24 crore), thus becoming the highest-grossing Indian film in Japan. After 28 weeks of run, it collected a distributor's share of more than ₹100 crore.

== Legacy and impact ==
The popularity of RRR in the US has led to an increase of Telugu-language movies in Netflix's stateside catalogue as much as 105 of 2024 - the most among many Indian languages and the ninth overall; other movies in related languages like Malayalam and Tamil have also seen followed increases in inventory. The OTT release of RRR had a massive impact on its global reach and popularity. Upon streaming, the film quickly became the most popular non-English film worldwide, breaking records on platforms like Netflix and Zee5. Its Hindi version especially resonated with audiences, securing a spot in Netflix's top 5 films in the US RRR trended in over 90 countries on streaming platforms, with more than 18 million watch hours globally. This digital success, coupled with global awards and critical acclaim, cemented RRR as a landmark in Indian cinema, showcasing the potential of Indian films on a worldwide stage.

== Accolades ==
The film has received various awards and nominations. The film was considered to be one of the best films of the year by the National Board of Review, making it only the second non-English film ever to make it to the list. RRR became the third Indian film and first Telugu film to receive nominations at the Golden Globe Awards. It was nominated for Best Foreign Language Film, and Best Original Song for "Naatu Naatu", winning the latter, made the song the first Asian nomination to win the award. The song "Naatu Naatu" also won the Academy Award for Best Original Song at the 95th Academy Awards, making it the first and only Indian song to win at the Oscars.

== Adaptations ==
In 2024, Takarazuka Revue's Star Troupe adapted the film into a musical titled RRR×Taka"R"Azuka - √Bheem-. In 2026, a musical titled RRR×TAKA”R”AZUKA －√Rama－ was also released.

== Future ==
Before the film's release, Rajamouli said that he had no intentions of making a sequel for RRR nor turning it into a franchise. However, writer Vijayendra Prasad said that "they started exploring the idea of sequel and hope to make it happen sometime later." Speaking with Variety, Rama Rao expressed his hope that the world of RRR would be continued as a franchise. During a screening event in Chicago, Rajamouli said that his father screenwriter Vijayendra Prasad is working on the sequel's story. The director also hinted at a sequel to RRR while interacting with fans in Japan in March 2024.

== See also ==
- List of Indian winners and nominees of the Golden Globe Awards
- List of films with longest production time
- Google Easter egg featuring RRR
