= List of 2025 box office number-one films in India =

This is a list of films which ranked number one at the weekend box office for the year 2025 in India as per Mojo.

== Number-one films ==
2025 Box office number-one films by weekend in India as per Mojo
#	Weekend end date	Film	Weekend domestic gross	Primary language	Ref
1	5 January	Mufasa: The Lion King	$1,709,136	English	
2	12 January	Mufasa: The Lion King	$684,153	English	
3	19 January	Mufasa: The Lion King	$457,015	English	
4	26 January	Mufasa: The Lion King	$224,291	English	
5	Feb January	Mufasa: The Lion King	$115,852	English	
6	9 February	Conclave	$102,624	English	
7	16 February	Captain America: Brave New World	$1,732,378	English	
8	23 February	Captain America: Brave New World	$223,226	English	
9	Mar February	The Brutalist	$144,492	English	
10	9 March	The Monkey	$235,443	English	
11	16 March	In the Lost Lands	$27,590	English	
12	23 March	Snow White	$282,545	English	
13	30 March	Snow White	$134,474	English	
14	6 April	Longlegs	$256,299	English	
15	13 April	The Amateur	$247,524	English	
16	20 April	The Amateur	$64,685	English	
17	27 April	Dog Man	$17,715	English	
18	4 May	Thunderbolts*	$1,799,585	English	
19	11 May	Thunderbolts*	$520,673	English	
20	18 May	Final Destination: Bloodlines	$3,197,239	English	
21	25 May	Final Destination: Bloodlines	$1,689,144	English	
22	Jun May	Lilo & Stitch	$124,340	English	
23	8 June	Lilo & Stitch	$103,367	English	
24	15 June	How to Train Your Dragon	$1,591,219	English	
25	22 June	How to Train Your Dragon	$709,165	English	
26	29 June	F1: The Movie	$3,124,162	English	
27	6 July	Jurassic World: Rebirth	$5,879,220	English	
28	13 July	Jurassic World: Rebirth	$2,754,886	English	
29	20 July	Jurassic World: Rebirth	$1,254,051	English	
30	27 July	The Fantastic Four: First Steps	$3,157,774	English	
31	3 August	The Fantastic Four: First Steps	$790,001	English	
32	10 August	The Fantastic Four: First Steps	$368,945	English	
33	17 August	The Fantastic Four: First Steps	$37,794	English	
34	24 August	Nobody 2	$166,604	English	
35	31 August	The Roses	$115,972	English	
36	7 September	The Conjuring: Last Rites	$8,840,216	English	
37	14 September	The Conjuring: Last Rites	$10,444,934	English	
38	21 September	The Roses	$9,136	English	
39	28 September	The Roses	$5,530	English	
40	5 October	Avatar: The Way of Water 2025 Re-release	$54,597	English	
41	12 October	Tron: Ares	$420,213	English	
42	19 October	Tron: Ares	$54,397	English	
43	26 October	Gabby's Dollhouse: The Movie	$10,571	English	
44	Nov October	Bugonia	$91,445	English	
45	9 November	Predator: Badlands	$1,056,452	English	
46	16 November	Predator: Badlands	$189,596	English	
47	23 November	Wicked: For Good	$155,936	English	
48	30 November	Zootopia 2	$1,073,213	English	
49	7 December	Zootopia 2	$585,667	English	
50	14 December	Zootopia 2	$392,567	English	
51	21 December	Avatar: Fire and Ash	$9,300,764	English	
52	28 December	Avatar: Fire and Ash	$3,997,310	English	

== Highest-grossing films ==
=== In-Year Release ===
Highest-grossing films of 2025 by In-year (Only domestic gross collection) release
Rank	Title	Domestic gross	Primary Language	Ref
1	Dhurandhar	₹1,057.80 crore	Hindi	
2	Kantara: Chapter 1	₹740.89 crore	Kannada	
3	Chhaava	₹708.50 crore	Hindi	
4	Saiyaara	₹409.18 crore	Hindi	
5	Coolie	₹337.50 crore	Tamil	
6	Mahavatar Narsimha	₹297.74 crore	Multilingual	
7	War 2	₹282.60 crore	Hindi	
8	Avatar: Fire and Ash	₹238 crore	English	
9	They Call Him OG	₹228.40 crore	Telugu	
10	Sankranthiki Vasthunam	₹219.80 crore	Telugu	

Highest-grossing films by CBFC rating of 2025
U	Zootopia 2
U/A	Kantara: Chapter 1
A	Dhurandhar

=== Re-releases ===
Top-grossing Re-released films in India in 2025
Rank	Title	Domestic gross	Primary Language	Ref
1	Baahubali: The Epic	₹40 crore	Telugu	
2	Sanam Teri Kasam	₹37.65 crore	Hindi	(Note: ₹50.3 crore domestic gross including re release, ₹12.65 crore domestic gross during initial run)
3	Interstellar	₹29 crore	English	

== See also ==
- List of Indian films of 2025
- List of 2024 box office number-one films in India
- List of 2026 box office number-one films in India
