= List of 2026 box office number-one films in India =

This is a list of films which ranked number one at the weekend box office for the year 2026 in India.

== Highest-grossing films ==
=== In-Year Release ===
Highest-grossing films of 2026 by In-year (Only domestic gross collection) release
Rank	Title	Domestic gross	Primary Language	Ref
1	Dhurandhar: The Revenge	₹1,376.51 crore	Hindi	
2	Ramayana: Part 1	₹1,051.94 crore	Hindi	
3	Spider-Man: Brand New Day	₹599.27 crore	English	
4	Jailer 2	₹555.21 crore	Tamil	
5	Drishyam: The Conclusion	₹443.37 crore	Hindi	
6	Border 2	₹406.79 crore	Hindi	
7	Hanuman Ansh	₹388.18 crore	Hindi	
8	Toxic	₹298.51 crore	Kannada; English	
9	Peddi	₹289 crore	Telugu	
10	Mirzapur	₹259.9 crore	Hindi	

Highest-grossing films by CBFC rating of 2026
U	N/A
U/A	Spider-Man: Brand New Day
A	Dhurandhar: The Revenge

== See also ==
- List of Indian films of 2026
- List of 2025 box office number-one films in India
