= List of Assamese films of the 2020s =

A list of films produced by the film industry of Assam based in Guwahati, India and publicly released in the decade of the 2020s. Premiere shows and film festival screenings are not considered as releases for this list.

== 2020s ==
=== 2020 ===
Opening	Title	Director	Cast	Ref.
3 January	Janaknandini	Amitav Borah	Gunjan Bhardwaj, Nandinee Kashyap, Arun Nath, Madhurima Chaudury, Rupam Baruah, Goutam Bora, Gauranga Bordoloi	
24 January	Goru	Himanshu Prasad Das	Chandan Das, Lonishri Das, Kamal Lochan, Pranjal Saikia, Arun Nath, Baharul Islam, Pakeeza Begum	
21 August	Avataran	Tarunabh Dutta	Pranjal Saikia, Purnima Saikia, Rimpi Das, Saurabh Hazarika, Samir Ranjan, Reema Begam, Devyam Seal, Govinda Malakar, Jyoti Thakuria, Rittick Sharma Tamuli, Nilakshi Deka, Jyoti Shankar Sharma, Ronit Raj, Sangeeta Pachani, Vishal Pratim Chaliha	
23 October	AVR	Arindam Sharma	Arnab Ayan, Ajay Barman, Niha Rani Das, Bikash Borah, Nilutpal Borah, etc.	

=== 2021 ===
Title	Producer / Studio	Certification date	Release format
Commando	Rekha Chamuah / R.C. Films Production	2 March 2021	Digital
Deuta	Dishan Dholua	29 April 2021	Digital
Kranti	Rajeeb Kumar Lahkar / Jai Maa Kamakhya Film	23 June 2021	Digital
Boroxun: Songs for Rain	Saj Entertainment	2 August 2021	Digital
Chandrawali	Bolin Sarmah / A B Production	30 August 2021	Theatrical
Deuta... I Miss You	Bachchu Roy / Gouri Films	3 September 2021	Theatrical
Avataran	Tarunabh Dutta / TD Film Studio	8 September 2021	Theatrical
Chandra Surjya Aadi	Ramen Gogoi / R G Production	13 September 2021	Theatrical
Tamaswini	Anamika Kalita	24 September 2021	Theatrical
Bogi the Warrior	Pranab Jyoti Sarmah / Kuhi Production	6 October 2021	Theatrical
Khyonachar	Sourav Baishya / Frame In Studio	8 November 2021	Theatrical
Xobdo Nixobdo Kolahol (Soul of Silence)	Monita Borgohain / Visionext	10 December 2021	Theatrical
Ekalavya	Ritwik Saikia / Rivan Productions LLP	16 December 2021	Theatrical

=== 2022 ===
In 2022, the romantic drama Emuthi Puthi attracted significant attention and saw success across Assam, marking a strong post-pandemic recovery for Assamese cinema.

=== 2023 ===
Release date	Title	Director	Cast	Studio (Production Company)	Ref.
27 January	Anur: Eyes on the sunshine	Monjul Boruah	Dr. Jahanara Begum, Rajat Kapoor, Udayan Duarah, Bibhuti Bhushan Hazarika, Boloram Das	Shivam Creations	
3 February	Dr. Bezbaruah 2	Nipon Goswami	Adil Hussain, Nipon Goswami, Zubeen Garg, Siddhartha Nipon Goswami, Kingkini Goswami, Madhurima Chowdhury, Papori Saikia	AM Television	
24 February	Black N White	Dhanjit Das	Ravi Sarma, Swagata Bharali, Himangshu Gogoi, Atanu Mahanta	ClockNDail Film Productions	
7 April	Advitya	Arindam Sharma	Ayan, Niha Rani Das, Pranjal Saikia, Atanu Kashyap, Bolin Sharma, Geetika Nanda	Krishna Kraft Productions	
28 April	Ki Kowa, Dosti..!!	Kenny Basumatary	Rupashree Phukan, Shruti Hussain, Saju Ahmed, Kaushik Nath, Jatin Das, Dipjyoti Dutta, Rimi Deori	Kenny DB Films	
26 May	The Consequence	Chandra Sekhar Das	Shabnam Bargoyari, Mrinal Das	AM Television	
5 June	Sri Raghupati	Suvrat Kakoti	Ravi Sarma, Preety Kongona, Arun Nath, Priyam Pallabi, Rina Bora, Arun Hazarika, Siddhartha Sharma, Bornali Pujari, Manujit Sharma, Raj Sharma, Kukil Saikia, Luna Devi	Maniratna Entertainment	
30 June	The Slam Book	Pranjal Gayari	Bibhuti Bhushan Hazarika, Nirupom Saikia, Shrestha B. Chowdhury, Papori Saikia	NK Production	
22 September	Tora's Husband	Rima Das	Abhijit Das, Tarali Kalita Das, Bhuman Bhargav Das, Purbanchali Das	Flying River Films	
6 October	Mamatar Sithi	Nirmal Das	Gunjan Bhardwaj, Geetanjali Saikia, Chetana Das, Rina Bora, Bhargav Kakati, Biplob Borkakati, Kabindra Das, Mallika Sharma	Mukha	
6 October	Eti Nakhyatra	Rudrajit Mazumder	Rina Bora, Suren Mahanta, Bishnu Kharghoria, Gitawali Rajkumari, Mintu Baruah, Rudrajit Mazumder	Hype Entertainment	
13 October	Veer	Narayan Seal	Raj Islam, Babli Bora, Pal Phukan, Lonishree Das, Saju Ahmed, Raktim Raj, Om Kashyap	Champawati Films	
27 October	Raghav	Jatin Bora	Jatin Bora, Nishita Goswami, Mridula Baruah, Hiranya Deka, Manmath Boruah, Bibhuti Bhushan Hazarika, Chinmay Kataki, Pabitra Boruah	JB Productions	
24 November	Rongatapu 1982	Adityam Saikia	Aimee Baruah, Gunjan Bhardwaj, Rimpi Das, Vivek Bora, Kalpana Kalita, Alishmita Goswami	BRC Cine Production	
8 December	Nellier Kotha	Parthajit Baruah	Arghadeep Baruah, Mintu Baruah, Swagata Bharali, Bhoisnavi Bora, Sanjivani Bora	Sunlit Studio	

=== 2024 ===
In 2024, Local Utpaat, directed by Kenny Basumatary, continued its strong run at the box office and entered the ₹1-crore-plus club, becoming the fifth Assamese film to achieve this milestone.

=== 2025 ===
In 2025, Roi Roi Binale, the final film of Zubeen Garg, became the highest-grossing Assamese film of all time. The film broke all previous records of the Assamese film Industry (Jollywood).

Release date	Title	Director	Cast	Studio (Production Company)	Ref.

=== 2026 ===
Release date	Title	Director	Cast	Studio (Production Company)	Ref.
