= Agalagurki =

- Village
- Location in Karnataka, India Agalagurki (India)
- Coordinates: 13.4139653°N 77.7390633°E
- Country: India
- State: Karnataka
- District: Chikkaballapura
- Talukas: Chikkaballapur

Government
  - Body: Village Panchayat

Languages
  - Official: Kannada
- Time zone: UTC+5:30 (IST)
- Nearest city: Bangalore
- Civic agency: Village Panchayat
- Website: www.chikballapur.nic.in

Agalagurki is a village in the southern state of Karnataka, India. It is located in the Chikkaballapur taluk of Chikkaballapura district in Karnataka.

== See also ==
- Chikkaballapur
- Districts of Karnataka
