= Sri Raghupati =

- Directed by: Suvrat Kakoti
- Written by: Ravi Sarma
- Based on: Vedalam (partially)
- Produced by: Sailen Sharma
- Starring: Ravi Sarma; Arun Hazarika; Arun Nath; Priyam Pallavi; Preety Kongana
- Cinematography: Pradip Daimary
- Edited by: Suvrat Kakoti
- Music by: Pranoy Dutta; Diganta Bharati
- Release date: 5 June 2023
- Running time: 129 minutes
- Country: India
- Language: Assamese
- Box office: ₹ 13.81-15 Crore

Sri Raghupati is an Indian Assamese-language crime thriller film directed by Suvrat Kakoti. It stars Ravi Sarma, Arun Hazarika, Arun Nath, Priyam Pallavi, and Preety Kongana in lead roles. The film is about the issue of women trafficking in the region. It was released in Assam and some cities outside Assam. It is the highest grossing Assamese film of 2023 and the third highest grossing Assamese film of all time surpassing Bhaimon Da (2025) and Bidurbhai (2024).

== Cast ==
- Ravi Sarma as Raghupati Rai Baruah
- Arun Hazarika as MLA
- Arun Nath as Detective Adhikari/Salman Khan
- Priyam Pallavi as Parismita Rai Baruah
- Preety Kongana as Manisha
- Siddartha Sharma as Kalyan Chandra Dutta
- Rina Bora as Raghupati and Parismita's mother
- Luna Devi as Tora
- Raj Sharma as Altaf
- Bornali Pujari as Rukhsar/Bidisha
- Manujit Sharma as Ibrahim
- Kukil Saikia as Hanif
- Biswajit Ojah as Senior Officer
- Siddhartha Mukherjee (cameo)

== Production ==
Sri Raghupati is directed by Suvrat Kakoti. The cast includes Ravi Sarma, Arun Hazarika, Arun Nath, Priyam Pallavi and Preety Kongana.

== Soundtracks ==
Sri Raghupati

Soundtrack album by Diganta Bharati, Pranoy Dutta
- Released: 9 June 2023
- Recorded: 2022–2023
- Genre: Feature film soundtrack
- Length: 20:48
- Label: Rootstock Entertainment
- Producer: Sailen Sharma

All songs of this film were composed by Diganta Bharati and Pranoy Dutta. The soundtrack album was released on 9 June 2023 and contains five tracks.

Tracklists
No.	Title	Singer(s)	Length
1.	"Tumi Aaru Moi"	Zubeen Garg, Deeplina Deka	4:10
2.	"Aahi Gol Raghupati"	Achurjya Borpatra, Preety Kongana	2:45
3.	"Hemeka Dusaku"	Dikshu, Nilakshi Neog	2:26
4.	"Umoli Jamoli"	Subasana Dutta	3:14
5.	"Narayan"	Pranoy Dutta	5:18

== See also ==
- List of Assamese films
