= List of 1952 box office number-one films in the United States =

This is a list of films which placed number one at the weekly box office in the United States during 1952.

== Number-one films ==
†	This implies the highest-grossing movie of the year.

#	Week ending	Film	Notes	Ref
1	January 2, 1952	Quo Vadis		
2	January 9, 1952	I'll See You in My Dreams	I'll See You in My Dreams reached number one in its fifth week of release.	
3	January 16, 1952	Quo Vadis	Quo Vadis earned $255,000 from 9 key cities in its ninth week of release.	
4	January 23, 1952	Quo Vadis		
5	January 30, 1952	Quo Vadis	Quo Vadis grossed $260,000 from the cities sampled.	
6	February 6, 1952	Quo Vadis	Quo Vadis grossed $200,000 from the cities sampled.	
7	February 13, 1952	Sailor Beware		
8	February 20, 1952	Quo Vadis	Quo Vadis returned to number one in its 14th week of release.	
9	February 27, 1952	The Greatest Show on Earth †	The Greatest Show on Earth grossed $390,000 from 9 key cities.	
10	March 5, 1952	The Greatest Show on Earth †		
11	March 12, 1952	The Greatest Show on Earth †		
12	March 19, 1952	The Greatest Show on Earth †	The Greatest Show on Earth grossed $502,000 from the cities sampled.	
13	March 26, 1952	The Greatest Show on Earth †		
14	April 2, 1952	The Greatest Show on Earth †	The Greatest Show on Earth grossed $230,000 from the cities sampled.	
15	April 9, 1952	The Battle at Apache Pass		
16	April 16, 1952	Singin' in the Rain		
17	April 23, 1952	Singin' in the Rain; With a Song in My Heart	Both Singin' in the Rain and With a Song in My Heart tied for first place.	
18	April 30, 1952	Singin' in the Rain	Singin' in the Rain grossed $240,000 from the cities sampled.	
19	May 7, 1952	The African Queen	The African Queen reached number one in its 11th week of release.	
20	May 14, 1952	Belles on Their Toes	Belles on Their Toes reached number one in its second week of release.	
21	May 21, 1952	Red Ball Express		
22	May 28, 1952	Skirts Ahoy!		
23	June 4, 1952	Skirts Ahoy!		
24	June 11, 1952	Skirts Ahoy!		
25	June 18, 1952	About Face	About Face reached number one in its 16th week of release.	
26	June 25, 1952	Pat and Mike	Pat and Mike reached number one in its second week of release.	
27	July 2, 1952	Scaramouche		
28	July 9, 1952	The Story of Robin Hood	The Story of Robin Hood reached number one in its second week of release.	
29	July 16, 1952	Lovely to Look At	Lovely to Look At reached number one in its second week of release.	
30	July 23, 1952	Jumping Jacks	Jumping Jacks reached number one in its sixth week of release.	
31	July 30, 1952	Jumping Jacks		
32	August 6, 1952	Jumping Jacks		
33	August 13, 1952	High Noon	High Noon reached number one in its third week of release.	
34	August 20, 1952	Affair in Trinidad	Affair in Trinidad reached number one in its third week of release.	
35	August 27, 1952	The World in His Arms		
36	September 3, 1952	What Price Glory	What Price Glory reached number one in its sixth week of release.	
37	September 10, 1952	Son of Paleface	Son of Paleface reached number one in its eighth week of release.	
38	September 17, 1952	The Merry Widow	The Merry Widow reached number one in its second week of release.	
39	September 24, 1952	The Quiet Man	The Quiet Man reached number one in its fifth week of release.	
40	October 1, 1952	Ivanhoe	Ivanhoe reached number one in its ninth week of release.	
41	October 8, 1952	Ivanhoe		
42	October 15, 1952	Ivanhoe	Ivanhoe grossed $460,000 from the cities sampled.	
43	October 22, 1952	Ivanhoe	Ivanhoe grossed $429,000 from the cities sampled.	
44	October 29, 1952	The Snows of Kilimanjaro		
45	November 5, 1952	The Snows of Kilimanjaro		
46	November 12, 1952	The Snows of Kilimanjaro		
47	November 19, 1952	The Snows of Kilimanjaro		
48	November 26, 1952	The Snows of Kilimanjaro		
49	December 3, 1952	The Iron Mistress	The Iron Mistress reached number one in its second week of release.	
50	December 10, 1952	Because of You		
51	December 17, 1952	The Thief	The Thief reached number one in its tenth week of release.	
52	December 24, 1952	Because of You	Because of You returned to number one in its third week of release.	
53	December 31, 1952	Million Dollar Mermaid	Million Dollar Mermaid reached number one in its fourth week of release.	

== Highest-grossing films ==
The highest-grossing films during the calendar year based on theatrical rentals were as follows:

Rank	Title	Distributor	Rental
1	The Greatest Show on Earth	Paramount Pictures	$12,000,000
2	Quo Vadis	Metro-Goldwyn-Mayer	$10,500,000
3	Ivanhoe	Metro-Goldwyn-Mayer	$7,000,000
4	The Snows of Kilimanjaro	20th Century Fox	$6,500,000
5	Sailor Beware	Paramount Pictures	$4,300,000
6	The African Queen	United Artists	$4,000,000
7	Jumping Jacks	Paramount Pictures	$4,000,000
8	High Noon	United Artists	$3,400,000
9	Son of Paleface	Paramount Pictures	$3,400,000
10	Singin' in the Rain	Metro-Goldwyn-Mayer	$3,300,000

== See also ==
- Lists of American films — American films by year
- Lists of box office number-one films

== Chronology ==
Preceded by 1951	1952	Succeeded by 1953
