= List of 1950 box office number-one films in the United States =

This is a list of films which placed number one at the weekly box office in the United States during 1950.

== Number-one films ==
†	This implies the highest-grossing movie of the year.

#	Week ending	Film	Notes	Ref
1	January 4, 1950	The Great Lover	No survey was published this week, but The Great Lover was #1 the previous week.	
2	January 11, 1950	On the Town	On the Town grossed $391,000 from 15 key cities.	
3	January 18, 1950	Sands of Iwo Jima	Sands of Iwo Jima grossed $215,000 from 14 key cities.	
4	January 25, 1950	Sands of Iwo Jima		
5	February 1, 1950	Samson and Delilah †	Samson and Delilah reached number one in its third week of release.	
6	February 8, 1950	Samson and Delilah †		
7	February 15, 1950	Samson and Delilah †		
8	February 22, 1950	Samson and Delilah †		
9	March 1, 1950	Samson and Delilah †		
10	March 8, 1950	Cinderella	Cinderella reached number one in its second week of release.	
11	March 15, 1950	Cinderella	Cinderella grossed $120,000 from the cities sampled.	
12	March 22, 1950	Francis	Francis reached number one in its sixth week of release.	
13	March 29, 1950	Francis		
14	April 5, 1950	Cinderella	Cinderella returned to number one in its sixth week of release with a gross of around $235,000.	
15	April 12, 1950	Cinderella		
16	April 19, 1950	Cheaper by the Dozen		
17	April 26, 1950	Riding High	Riding High reached number one in its second week of release.	
18	May 3, 1950	The Third Man	The Third Man returned to number one in its 13th week of release.	
19	May 10, 1950	The Daughter of Rosie O'Grady	The Daughter of Rosie O'Grady reached number one in its second week of release.	
20	May 17, 1950	The Damned Don't Cry	The Damned Don't Cry reached number one in its second week of release.	
21	May 24, 1950	Annie Get Your Gun		
22	May 31, 1950	The Big Hangover		
23	June 7, 1950	Father of the Bride		
24	June 14, 1950	Annie Get Your Gun	Annie Get Your Gun returned to number one in its fourth week of release.	
25	June 21, 1950	Father of the Bride	Father of the Bride returned to number one in its third week of release.	
26	June 28, 1950	Father of the Bride		
27	July 5, 1950	Father of the Bride		
28	July 12, 1950	Father of the Bride	Father of the Bride grossed $210,000 from the cities sampled.	
29	July 19, 1950	Winchester '73	Winchester '73 grossed $236,000 from 17 key cities.	
30	July 26, 1950	Duchess of Idaho	Duchess of Idaho reached number one in its second week of release.	
31	August 2, 1950	The Flame and the Arrow	The Flame and the Arrow reached number one in its fourth week of release.	
32	August 9, 1950	Three Little Words	Three Little Words reached number one in its fourth week of release.	
33	August 16, 1950	Treasure Island	Treasure Island reached number one in its third week of release.	
34	August 23, 1950	Sunset Boulevard	Sunset Boulevard earned $165,000 from 5 key cities in its second week of release.	
35	August 30, 1950	Sunset Boulevard		
36	September 6, 1950	The Black Rose	The Black Rose grossed $455,000 from 15 key cities.	
37	September 13, 1950	The Black Rose		
38	September 20, 1950	My Blue Heaven		
39	September 27, 1950	My Blue Heaven		
40	October 4, 1950	No Way Out		
41	October 11, 1950	Mister 880		
42	October 18, 1950	Mister 880		
43	October 25, 1950	The Glass Menagerie	The Glass Menagerie reached number one in its fourth week of release.	
44	November 1, 1950	All About Eve	All About Eve reached number one in its third week of release.	
45	November 8, 1950	All About Eve		
46	November 15, 1950	Rio Grande	Rio Grande grossed $240,000 from 17 key cities.	
47	November 22, 1950	King Solomon's Mines	King Solomon's Mines grossed $240,000 from 5 key cities.	
48	November 29, 1950	King Solomon's Mines	King Solomon's Mines grossed $504,000 from 22 key cities.	
49	December 6, 1950	King Solomon's Mines	King Solomon's Mines grossed $400,000 from the cities sampled.	
50	December 13, 1950	King Solomon's Mines		
51	December 20, 1950	King Solomon's Mines		
52	December 27, 1950	Mr. Music	Mr. Music grossed $310,000 from 12 key cities.	

== Highest-grossing films ==
The highest-grossing films during the calendar year based on theatrical rentals were as follows:

Rank	Title	Distributor	Rental
1	Samson and Delilah	Paramount Pictures	$11,000,000
2	Battleground	Metro-Goldwyn-Mayer	$4,550,000
3	King Solomon's Mines	Metro-Goldwyn-Mayer	$4,400,000
4	Cheaper by the Dozen	20th Century Fox	$4,325,000
5	Annie Get Your Gun	Metro-Goldwyn-Mayer	$4,200,000
6	Cinderella	RKO Pictures	$4,150,000
7	Father of the Bride	Metro-Goldwyn-Mayer	$4,150,000
8	Sands of Iwo Jima	Republic Pictures	$3,900,000
9	Broken Arrow	20th Century Fox	$3,550,000
10	Twelve O'Clock High	20th Century Fox	$3,225,000

== See also ==
- Lists of American films — American films by year
- Lists of box office number-one films

== Chronology ==
Preceded by 1949	1950	Succeeded by 1951
