= Marika Aba =

Hungarian-American dancer and journalist (1929–1972)

- Born: Marika Wolff; November 12, 1929; Budapest, Kingdom of Hungary
- Died: November 12, 1972 (aged 43); Bichat–Claude Bernard Hospital, Paris, France
- Burial place: Protestant Cemetery, Rome, Italy
- Other names: Marika Aba Semler
- Citizenship: American (1956–1972)
- Occupations: Dancer; journalist
- Spouse: Norman Nathan Semler (m. 1954; div. 1966)
- Children: 1

Marika Aba (né Marika Wolff; 1929–1972) was a Hungarian born, Hungarian-American dancer and journalist.

Aba's father was an engineer who disappeared while working in Turkey at the outbreak of World War II. After the war, during the Soviet occupation of Hungary, she and her mother, Georgina Maros, escaped to Austria by swimming across a river at night. Having trained as a ballerina in Austria, she was a prima ballerina in Rome when she landed the role of the "Assyrian Dancer at Nero's banquet" in the 1951 movie Quo Vadis. After this role, she and her mother moved to Sherman Oaks, California.

In 1952, she appeared as the flower girl in the MGM musical film Lovely to Look At. In 1961, she appeared as a contestant on the TV quiz show, You Bet Your Life, hosted by Groucho Marx. She was escorted on stage by Harpo Marx.

After her brief film career she became a journalist, writing for the Los Angeles Times about the arts. She returned to Italy and focused her reporting on the Italian movie industry. Film critic Charles Champlin noted the "ebullience and wit" of her writing. At the time of her death, Aba was publicity director for Verona Film, and production and publicity liaison for Paramount Pictures and Cinema International Corporation.

== Personal life and death ==
In June 1954, Aba married Norman Nathan Semiet. The couple had one son before later divorcing in March 1966. Aba became a naturalised American citizen in April 1956.

Aba died at Bichat–Claude Bernard Hospital on her 43rd birthday following what was described as "a long illness", and was Aba was buried at the Protestant Cemetery in Rome.

== Filmography ==
Year	Title	Role	Notes	Ref(s)
1951	Quo Vadis	Assyrian Dancer at Nero's Banquet	Uncredited	
1952	Lovely to Look At	Flower Girl	Uncredited, (final film role)	
