= List of 1949 box office number-one films in the United States =

This is a list of films which placed number one at the weekly box office in the United States during 1949.

== Number-one films ==
†	This implies the highest-grossing movie of the year.

#	Week ending	Film	Notes	Ref
1	January 5, 1949	The Paleface		
2	January 12, 1949	The Paleface		
3	January 19, 1949	Words and Music		
4	January 26, 1949	The Snake Pit	The Snake Pit reached number one in its 11th week of release.	
5	February 2, 1949	Joan of Arc		
6	February 9, 1949	Joan of Arc		
7	February 16, 1949	Joan of Arc		
8	February 23, 1949	Command Decision		
9	March 2, 1949	Whispering Smith	Whispering Smith reached number one in its 12th week of release.	
10	March 9, 1949	Whispering Smith		
11	March 16, 1949	A Letter to Three Wives	A Letter to Three Wives reached number one in its sixth week of release.	
12	March 23, 1949	Mother Is a Freshman	Mother Is a Freshman reached number one in its second week of release.	
13	March 30, 1949	Knock on Any Door	Knock on Any Door reached number one in its second week of release.	
14	April 6, 1949	The Set-Up	The Set-Up grossed $245,000 from 13 key cities.	
15	April 13, 1949	The Set-Up		
16	April 20, 1949	A Connecticut Yankee in King Arthur's Court	A Connecticut Yankee in King Arthur's Court grossed $170,000 from the cities sampled.	
17	April 27, 1949	A Connecticut Yankee in King Arthur's Court		
18	May 4, 1949	A Connecticut Yankee in King Arthur's Court		
19	May 11, 1949	Flamingo Road	Flamingo Road reached number one in its second week of release	
20	May 18, 1949	Mr. Belvedere Goes to College	Mr. Belvedere Goes to College reached number one in its fifth week of release.	
21	May 25, 1949	Flamingo Road	Flamingo Road returned to number one in its fourth week of release.	
22	June 1, 1949	The Stratton Story	The Stratton Story reached number one in its third week of release.	
23	June 8, 1949	The Stratton Story		
24	June 15, 1949	Home of the Brave	Home of the Brave reached number one in its fifth week of release.	
25	June 22, 1949	It Happens Every Spring	It Happens Every Spring reached number one in its third week of release.	
26	June 29, 1949	Sorrowful Jones	Sorrowful Jones reached number one in its fourth week of release and grossed $260,000 from the cities sampled.	
27	July 6, 1949	Neptune's Daughter; Sorrowful Jones	Neptune's Daughter reached number one in its fourth week of release. Variety split the honors evenly but noted that Neptune's Daughter held a slight edge due to being in it second week of release in most spots.	
28	July 13, 1949	Sorrowful Jones; Neptune's Daughter		
29	July 20, 1949	Sorrowful Jones; The Girl from Jones Beach	Both Sorrowful Jones and The Girl from Jones Beach were classed as neck-and-neck for first place with The Girl from Jones Beach grossing more than $220,000 but Sorrowful Jones having better showings despite grossing less from the cities sampled.	
30	July 27, 1949	Any Number Can Play	Any Number Can Play reached number one in its second week of release.	
31	August 3, 1949	Look for the Silver Lining	Look for the Silver Lining reached number one in its sixth week of release grossing $370,000 from 14 key cities.	
32	August 10, 1949	In the Good Old Summertime	In the Good Old Summertime reached number one in its second week of release.	
33	August 17, 1949	Look for the Silver Lining	Look for the Silver Lining returned to number one in its eighth week of release.	
34	August 24, 1949	Black Magic		
35	August 31, 1949	It's a Great Feeling		
36	September 7, 1949	White Heat		
37	September 14, 1949	Top o' the Morning	Top o' the Morning reached number one in its second week of release.	
38	September 21, 1949	I Was a Male War Bride	I Was a Male War Bride reached number one in its fourth week of release.	
39	September 28, 1949	I Was a Male War Bride		
40	October 5, 1949	My Friend Irma	My Friend Irma reached number one in its seventh week of release.	
41	October 12, 1949	Father Was a Fullback	Father Was a Fullback earned $240,000 from the cities sampled in its second week of release.	
42	October 19, 1949	Jolson Sings Again †	Jolson Sings Again reached number one in its tenth week of release.	
43	October 26, 1949	Jolson Sings Again †	Jolson Sings Again grossed $390,000 from the cities sampled.	
44	November 2, 1949	Jolson Sings Again †	Jolson Sings Again grossed $305,000 from the cities sampled.	
45	November 9, 1949	Jolson Sings Again †		
46	November 16, 1949	Jolson Sings Again †		
47	November 23, 1949	That Forsyte Woman	That Forsyte Woman reached number one in its third week of release.	
48	November 30, 1949	Oh, You Beautiful Doll	Oh, You Beautiful Doll reached number one in its third week of release.	
49	December 7, 1949	Pinky	Pinky reached number one in its tenth week of release.	
50	December 14, 1949	Pinky		
51	December 21, 1949	The Great Lover	The Great Lover reached number one in its fourth week of release.	
52	December 28, 1949	The Great Lover		

== Highest-grossing films ==
The highest-grossing films during the calendar year based on theatrical rentals were as follows:

Rank	Title	Distributor	Rental
1	Jolson Sings Again	Columbia Pictures	$5,500,000
2	Pinky	20th Century Fox	$4,200,000
3	I Was a Male War Bride	20th Century Fox	$4,100,000
4	The Snake Pit	20th Century Fox	$4,100,000
5	Joan of Arc	RKO Pictures	$4,100,000
6	The Stratton Story	Metro-Goldwyn-Mayer	$3,700,000
7	Mr. Belvedere Goes to College	20th Century Fox	$3,650,000
8	Little Women	Metro-Goldwyn-Mayer	$3,600,000
9	Words and Music	Metro-Goldwyn-Mayer	$3,500,000
10	Neptune's Daughter	Metro-Goldwyn-Mayer	$3,450,000

== See also ==
- Lists of American films — American films by year
- Lists of box office number-one films

== Chronology ==
Preceded by 1948	1949	Succeeded by 1950
