= List of 1958 box office number-one films in the United States =

This is a list of films which placed number one at the weekly box office in the United States during 1958.

== Number-one films ==
†	This implies the highest-grossing movie of the year.

#	Week ending	Film	Notes	Ref
1	January 1, 1958	Sayonara	Sayonara grossed $450,000 from 9 key cities.	
2	January 8, 1958	Sayonara		
3	January 15, 1958	Sayonara		
4	January 22, 1958	Sayonara	Sayonara grossed $421,000.	
5	January 29, 1958	Sayonara		
6	February 5, 1958	Peyton Place		
7	February 12, 1958	A Farewell to Arms		
8	February 19, 1958	A Farewell to Arms		
9	February 26, 1958	Witness for the Prosecution		
10	March 5, 1958	Witness for the Prosecution		
11	March 12, 1958	The Brothers Karamazov	The Brothers Karamazov earned $300,000 from 9 key cities in its third week of release.	
12	March 19, 1958	The Bridge on the River Kwai †	The Bridge on the River Kwai earned $450,000 from the cities sampled.	
13	March 26, 1958	The Bridge on the River Kwai †		
14	April 2, 1958	The Bridge on the River Kwai †	The Bridge on the River Kwai earned nearly $600,000 from the cities sampled.	
15	April 9, 1958	The Bridge on the River Kwai †		
16	April 16, 1958	The Bridge on the River Kwai †		
17	April 23, 1958	The Young Lions		
18	April 30, 1958	The Bridge on the River Kwai †	The Bridge on the River Kwai returned to number one in its 20th week of its wide release.	
19	May 7, 1958	The Bridge on the River Kwai †		
20	May 14, 1958	South Pacific	South Pacific reached number one in its eighth week of release.	
21	May 21, 1958	South Pacific		
22	May 28, 1958	South Pacific		
23	June 4, 1958	God's Little Acre		
24	June 11, 1958	South Pacific	South Pacific returned to number one in its 12th week of release.	
25	June 18, 1958	South Pacific		
26	June 25, 1958	South Pacific		
27	July 2, 1958	The Vikings	The Vikings grossed more than $420,000 from the cities sampled.	
28	July 9, 1958	The Vikings		
29	July 16, 1958	The Vikings		
30	July 23, 1958	Indiscreet		
31	July 30, 1958	Indiscreet		
32	August 6, 1958	Indiscreet		
33	August 13, 1958	Indiscreet		
34	August 20, 1958	South Pacific	South Pacific returned to number one in its 22nd week of release.	
35	August 27, 1958	South Pacific		
36	September 3, 1958	Cat on a Hot Tin Roof	Cat on a Hot Tin Roof grossed over $1 million nationally over the Labor Day weekend	
37	September 10, 1958	Cat on a Hot Tin Roof		
38	September 17, 1958	Cat on a Hot Tin Roof		
39	September 24, 1958	Cat on a Hot Tin Roof		
40	October 1, 1958	Cat on a Hot Tin Roof		
41	October 8, 1958	Damn Yankees		
42	October 15, 1958	Cat on a Hot Tin Roof	Cat on a Hot Tin Roof returned to number one in its seventh week of release.	
43	October 22, 1958	Cat on a Hot Tin Roof		
44	October 29, 1958	Cat on a Hot Tin Roof		
45	November 5, 1958	Cat on a Hot Tin Roof		
46	November 12, 1958	In Love and War		
47	November 19, 1958	The Last Hurrah		
48	November 26, 1958	Houseboat	Houseboat grossed more than $300,000 in 22 key cities.	
49	December 3, 1958	Mardi Gras	Mardi Gras reached number one in its third week of release.	
50	December 10, 1958	Mardi Gras		
51	December 17, 1958	South Seas Adventure		
52	December 24, 1958	The Buccaneer		

== Highest-grossing films ==
The highest-grossing films during the calendar year based on theatrical rentals were as follows:

Rank	Title	Distributor	Rental
1	The Bridge on the River Kwai	Columbia Pictures	$15,000,000
2	Peyton Place	20th Century Fox	$11,000,000
3	Sayonara	Warner Bros.	$10,500,000
4	No Time for Sergeants	Warner Bros.	$7,200,000
5	The Vikings	United Artists	$7,000,000
6	Search for Paradise	Cinerama Releasing Corp.	$6,500,000
7	South Pacific	Metro-Goldwyn-Mayer	$6,400,000
8	Cat on a Hot Tin Roof	Metro-Goldwyn-Mayer	$6,100,000
9	Old Yeller	Buena Vista	$5,900,000
10	Raintree County	Metro-Goldwyn-Mayer	$5,800,000

== See also ==
- Lists of American films — American films by year
- Lists of box office number-one films

== Chronology ==
Preceded by 1957	1958	Succeeded by 1959
