= List of 1957 box office number-one films in the United States =

This is a list of films which placed number one at the weekly box office in the United States during 1957.

== Number-one films ==
†	This implies the highest-grossing movie of the year.

#	Week ending	Film	Notes	Ref
1	January 2, 1957	The Teahouse of the August Moon		
2	January 9, 1957	The Teahouse of the August Moon		
3	January 16, 1957	The Ten Commandments †	The Ten Commandments reached number one in its tenth week of release.	
4	January 23, 1957	Anastasia	Anastasia reached number one in its sixth week of release.	
5	January 30, 1957	Anastasia		
6	February 6, 1957	The Ten Commandments †	The Ten Commandments reached number one in its 13th week of release.	
7	February 13, 1957	The Ten Commandments †		
8	February 20, 1957	The Ten Commandments †		
9	February 27, 1957	The Ten Commandments †		
10	March 6, 1957	The Ten Commandments †	The Ten Commandments grossed $425,000 from 19 key cities.	
11	March 13, 1957	The Ten Commandments †	The Ten Commandments grossed $400,000 from the cities sampled.	
12	March 20, 1957	The Ten Commandments †		
13	March 27, 1957	The Ten Commandments †		
14	April 3, 1957	The Ten Commandments †		
15	April 10, 1957	The Ten Commandments †		
16	April 17, 1957	The Ten Commandments †		
17	April 24, 1957	Funny Face	Funny Face earned $400,000 from 17 key cities in its tenth week of release.	
18	May 1, 1957	Around the World in 80 Days	Around the World in 80 Days earned $300,000 from 13 key cities in its 28th week of release.	
19	May 8, 1957	Funny Face	Funny Face returned to number one in its 12th week of release.	
20	May 15, 1957	Around the World in 80 Days	Around the World in 80 Days returned to number one in its 30th week of release.	
21	May 22, 1957	Around the World in 80 Days		
22	May 29, 1957	Around the World in 80 Days		
23	June 5, 1957	Gunfight at the O.K. Corral	Gunfight at the O.K. Corral grossed more than $420,000 in 13 key cities.	
24	June 12, 1957	Gunfight at the O.K. Corral		
25	June 19, 1957	Island in the Sun	Island in the Sun grossed $500,000 from 16 key cities.	
26	June 26, 1957	Island in the Sun		
27	July 3, 1957	Around the World in 80 Days	Around the World in 80 Days returned to number one in its 37th week of release.	
28	July 10, 1957	Around the World in 80 Days		
29	July 17, 1957	Around the World in 80 Days		
30	July 24, 1957	Around the World in 80 Days		
31	July 31, 1957	Around the World in 80 Days		
32	August 7, 1957	Around the World in 80 Days		
33	August 14, 1957	The Pride and the Passion	The Pride and the Passion reached number one in its fifth week of release.	
34	August 21, 1957	Around the World in 80 Days	Around the World in 80 Days earned $358,000 from 19 key cities in its 44th week of release.	
35	August 28, 1957	Around the World in 80 Days		
36	September 4, 1957	The Pajama Game	The Pajama Game grossed $400,000 from 13 key cities.	
37	September 11, 1957	Around the World in 80 Days	Around the World in 80 Days returned to number one in its 47th week of release.	
38	September 18, 1957	Around the World in 80 Days		
39	September 25, 1957	Around the World in 80 Days		
40	October 2, 1957	Jet Pilot		
41	October 9, 1957	Around the World in 80 Days	Around the World in 80 Days returned to number one in its 51st week of release.	
42	October 16, 1957	Around the World in 80 Days		
43	October 23, 1957	Around the World in 80 Days		
44	October 30, 1957	Around the World in 80 Days		
45	November 6, 1957	Around the World in 80 Days		
46	November 13, 1957	Around the World in 80 Days		
47	November 20, 1957	Around the World in 80 Days		
48	November 27, 1957	Pal Joey	Pal Joey reached number one in its fifth week of release.	
49	December 4, 1957	Pal Joey		
50	December 11, 1957	Around the World in 80 Days	Around the World in 80 Days returned to number one in its 60th week of release.	
51	December 18, 1957	Around the World in 80 Days		
52	December 25, 1957	The Sad Sack	The Sad Sack reached number one in its fourth week of release.	

== Highest-grossing films ==
The highest-grossing films during the calendar year based on theatrical rentals were as follows:

Rank	Title	Distributor	Rental
1	The Ten Commandments	Paramount Pictures	$18,500,000
2	Around the World in 80 Days	United Artists	$16,200,000
3	Giant	Warner Bros.	$12,000,000
4	Pal Joey	Columbia Pictures	$6,700,000
5	Seven Wonders of the World	Cinerama Releasing Corp.	$6,500,000
6	The Teahouse of the August Moon	Metro-Goldwyn-Mayer	$5,600,000
7	The Pride and the Passion	United Artists	$5,500,000
8	Anastasia	20th Century Fox	$5,000,000
9	Island in the Sun	20th Century Fox	$4,500,000
10	Love Me Tender	20th Century Fox	$4,400,000

== See also ==
- Lists of American films — American films by year
- Lists of box office number-one films

== Chronology ==
Preceded by 1956	1957	Succeeded by 1958
