= List of 1953 box office number-one films in the United States =

This is a list of films which placed number one at the weekly box office in the United States during 1953.

== Number-one films ==
†	This implies the highest-grossing movie of the year.

#	Week ending	Film	Notes	Ref
1	January 7, 1953	Million Dollar Mermaid		
2	January 14, 1953	Million Dollar Mermaid		
3	January 21, 1953	Above and Beyond	Above and Beyond reached number one in its ninth week of release.	
4	January 28, 1953	The Bad and the Beautiful	The Bad and the Beautiful reached number one in its second week of release.	
5	February 4, 1953	The Bad and the Beautiful		
6	February 11, 1953	The Bad and the Beautiful		
7	February 18, 1953	Peter Pan	Peter Pan earned $270,000 from 5 key cities in its second week of release.	
8	February 25, 1953	Peter Pan	Peter Pan grossed $400,000 from the cities sampled.	
9	March 4, 1953	Peter Pan		
10	March 11, 1953	Peter Pan		
11	March 18, 1953	Peter Pan		
12	March 25, 1953	Come Back, Little Sheba	Come Back, Little Sheba reached number one in its 13th week of release.	
13	April 1, 1953	Peter Pan	Peter Pan returned to number one in its eighth week of release.	
14	April 8, 1953	Call Me Madam	Call Me Madam reached number one in its fifth week of release.	
15	April 15, 1953	Salome	Salome reached number one in its third week of release.	
16	April 22, 1953	Salome		
17	April 29, 1953	House of Wax		
18	May 6, 1953	House of Wax	House of Wax grossed $690,000 from 20 key cities.	
19	May 13, 1953	House of Wax	House of Wax grossed $563,000 from 21 key cities.	
20	May 20, 1953	House of Wax		
21	May 27, 1953	House of Wax		
22	June 3, 1953	Young Bess	Young Bess grossed $400,000 from 22 key cities.	
23	June 10, 1953	Fort Ti	Fort Ti reached number one in its second week of release.	
24	June 17, 1953	It Came from Outer Space	It Came from Outer Space reached number one in its second week of release.	
25	June 24, 1953	It Came from Outer Space		
26	July 1, 1953	The Beast from 20,000 Fathoms	The Beast from 20,000 Fathoms reached number one in its third week of release.	
27	July 8, 1953	Dangerous When Wet		
28	July 15, 1953	The Charge at Feather River		
29	July 22, 1953	The Charge at Feather River		
30	July 29, 1953	Second Chance	Second Chance reached number one in its second week of release.	
31	August 5, 1953	Gentlemen Prefer Blondes	Gentlemen Prefer Blondes reached number one in its third week of release.	
32	August 12, 1953	The Band Wagon		
33	August 19, 1953	Gentlemen Prefer Blondes	Gentlemen Prefer Blondes returned to number one in its fifth week of release.	
34	August 26, 1953	Gentlemen Prefer Blondes		
35	September 2, 1953	From Here to Eternity	From Here to Eternity reached number one in its fourth week of release.	
36	September 9, 1953	From Here to Eternity	From Here to Eternity grossed $460,000 from 9 key cities.	
37	September 16, 1953	From Here to Eternity		
38	September 23, 1953	From Here to Eternity		
39	September 30, 1953	The Robe †	The Robe earned $499,000 from 4 key cities in its second week of release.	
40	October 7, 1953	The Robe †	The Robe grossed $813,000 from 11 key cities.	
41	October 14, 1953	The Robe †	The Robe grossed $1,026,000 from 16 key cities, which was a record for any film gross during a week.	
42	October 21, 1953	The Robe †	The Robe grossed $896,000 from 17 key cities.	
43	October 28, 1953	The Robe †	The Robe grossed $923,000 from 21 key cities.	
44	November 4, 1953	The Robe †		
45	November 11, 1953	The Robe †	The Robe grossed more than $730,000 from the cities sampled.	
46	November 18, 1953	The Robe †		
47	November 25, 1953	The Robe †		
48	December 2, 1953	How to Marry a Millionaire	How to Marry a Millionaire reached number one in its fourth week of release.	
49	December 9, 1953	How to Marry a Millionaire		
50	December 16, 1953	How to Marry a Millionaire	How to Marry a Millionaire grossed $265,000 from 16 key cities.	
51	December 23, 1953	This Is Cinerama		
52	December 30, 1953	Easy to Love		

== Highest-grossing films ==
The highest-grossing films during the calendar year based on theatrical rentals were as follows:

Rank	Title	Distributor	Rental
1	The Robe	20th Century Fox	$20–30,000,000
2	From Here to Eternity	Columbia Pictures	$12,500,000
3	Shane	Paramount Pictures	$8,000,000
4	How to Marry a Millionaire	20th Century Fox	$7,500,000
5	Peter Pan	RKO Pictures	$7,000,000
6	Hans Christian Andersen	RKO Pictures	$6,000,000
7	House of Wax	Warner Bros.	$5,500,000
8	Mogambo	Metro-Goldwyn-Mayer	$5,200,000
9	Gentlemen Prefer Blondes	20th Century Fox	$5,100,000
10	Moulin Rouge	United Artists	$5,000,000

== See also ==
- Lists of American films — American films by year
- Lists of box office number-one films

== Chronology ==
Preceded by 1952	1953	Succeeded by 1954
