= List of 1956 box office number-one films in the United States =

This is a list of films which placed number one at the weekly box office in the United States during 1956.

== Number-one films ==
†	This implies the highest-grossing movie of the year.

#	Week ending	Film	Notes	Ref
1	January 4, 1956	Guys and Dolls †		
2	January 11, 1956	Guys and Dolls †		
3	January 18, 1956	Guys and Dolls †	Guys and Dolls grossed $300,000 from the cities sampled.	
4	January 25, 1956	Guys and Dolls †	Guys and Dolls grossed $276,000 from 24 key cities.	
5	February 1, 1956	Helen of Troy	Helen of Troy grossed more than $323,000 from 11 key cities.	
6	February 8, 1956	The Benny Goodman Story		
7	February 15, 1956	The Benny Goodman Story		
8	February 22, 1956	Picnic	Picnic reached number one in its 11th week of release.	
9	February 29, 1956	Picnic		
10	March 7, 1956	Picnic		
11	March 14, 1956	Picnic		
12	March 21, 1956	Picnic		
13	March 28, 1956	Carousel	Carousel reached number one in its sixth week of release.	
14	April 4, 1956	Alexander the Great	Alexander the Great grossed $300,000 from the cities sampled.	
15	April 11, 1956	Carousel	Carousel returned to number one in its eighth week of release.	
16	April 18, 1956	The Man in the Gray Flannel Suit		
17	April 25, 1956	The Swan	The Swan grossed $356,000 from the cities sampled.	
18	May 2, 1956	The Swan		
19	May 9, 1956	The Man in the Gray Flannel Suit	The Man in the Gray Flannel Suit returned to number one in its fourth week of release.	
20	May 16, 1956	The Revolt of Mamie Stover	The Revolt of Mamie Stover grossed $300,000 from the cities sampled.	
21	May 23, 1956	The Man Who Knew Too Much		
22	May 30, 1956	The Man Who Knew Too Much		
23	June 6, 1956	The Searchers	The Searchers reached number one in its second week of release.	
24	June 13, 1956	The Searchers		
25	June 20, 1956	Bhowani Junction	Bhowani Junction reached number one in its seventh week of release.	
26	June 27, 1956	The Catered Affair	The Catered Affair reached number one in its second week of release.	
27	July 4, 1956	Trapeze	Trapeze earned $555,000 from 21 key cities in its fifth week of release.	
28	July 11, 1956	Trapeze		
29	July 18, 1956	The King and I	The King and I reached number one in its third week of release.	
30	July 25, 1956	The King and I		
31	August 1, 1956	The King and I		
32	August 8, 1956	The King and I	The King and I grossed $400,000 from 23 key cities.	
33	August 15, 1956	High Society	High Society reached number one in its fourth week of release.	
34	August 22, 1956	High Society		
35	August 29, 1956	High Society		
36	September 5, 1956	High Society		
37	September 12, 1956	High Society		
38	September 19, 1956	High Society	High Society grossed $300,000 from the cities sampled.	
39	September 26, 1956	High Society		
40	October 3, 1956	Tea and Sympathy	Tea and Sympathy grossed $436,000 from the cities sampled.	
41	October 10, 1956	War and Peace	War and Peace reached number one in its seventh week of release.	
42	October 17, 1956	War and Peace	War and Peace grossed more than $316,000 from 16 key cities.	
43	October 24, 1956	War and Peace	War and Peace grossed more than $318,000 from 21 key cities.	
44	October 31, 1956	War and Peace		
45	November 7, 1956	Giant	Giant grossed more than $400,000 from 10 key cities.	
46	November 14, 1956	Giant	Giant grossed $600,000 from the cities sampled.	
47	November 21, 1956	Giant	Giant grossed more than $660,000 from the cities sampled.	
48	November 28, 1956	Giant	Giant grossed more than $600,000 from 20 key cities.	
49	December 5, 1956	Giant	Giant grossed $445,000 from the cities sampled.	
50	December 12, 1956	Giant		
51	December 19, 1956	The Ten Commandments	The Ten Commandments reached number one in its sixth week of release.	
52	December 26, 1956	The Ten Commandments		

== Highest-grossing films ==
The highest-grossing films during the calendar year based on theatrical rentals were as follows:

Rank	Title	Distributor	Rental
1	Guys and Dolls	Metro-Goldwyn-Mayer	$9,000,000
2	The King and I	20th Century Fox	$8,500,000
3	Trapeze	United Artists	$7,500,000
4	High Society	Metro-Goldwyn-Mayer	$6,500,000
5	I'll Cry Tomorrow	Metro-Goldwyn-Mayer	$6,500,000
6	Picnic	Columbia Pictures	$6,300,000
7	War and Peace	Paramount Pictures	$6,250,000
8	The Eddy Duchin Story	Columbia Pictures	$5,300,000
9	Moby Dick	Warner Bros.	$5,200,000
10	The Searchers	Warner Bros.	$4,800,000

== See also ==
- Lists of American films — American films by year
- Lists of box office number-one films

== Chronology ==
Preceded by 1955	1956	Succeeded by 1957
