= List of 1951 box office number-one films in the United States =

This is a list of films which placed number one at the weekly box office in the United States during 1951.

== Number-one films ==
†	This implies the highest-grossing movie of the year.

#	Week ending	Film	Notes	Ref
1	January 3, 1951	Mr. Music		
2	January 10, 1951	Harvey	Harvey reached number one in its third week of release.	
3	January 17, 1951	Harvey		
4	January 24, 1951	Halls of Montezuma	Halls of Montezuma reached number one in its third week of release.	
5	January 31, 1951	At War with the Army	At War with the Army reached number one in its fifth week of release.	
6	February 7, 1951	At War with the Army	At War with the Army grossed $350,000 from 16 key cities.	
7	February 14, 1951	At War with the Army	At War with the Army grossed $200,000 from the cities sampled.	
8	February 21, 1951	Born Yesterday	Born Yesterday reached number one in its eighth week of release.	
9	February 28, 1951	Payment on Demand	Payment on Demand reached number one in its fourth week of release.	
10	March 7, 1951	Payment on Demand		
11	March 14, 1951	Born Yesterday	Born Yesterday returned to number one in its 11th week of release.	
12	March 21, 1951	Born Yesterday		
13	March 28, 1951	Royal Wedding	Royal Wedding grossed $492,000 from the cities sampled.	
14	April 4, 1951	Royal Wedding		
15	April 11, 1951	Royal Wedding		
16	April 18, 1951	Father's Little Dividend		
17	April 25, 1951	Father's Little Dividend		
18	May 2, 1951	Father's Little Dividend		
19	May 9, 1951	Father's Little Dividend		
20	May 16, 1951	The Great Caruso	The Great Caruso reached number one in its fourth week of release.	
21	May 23, 1951	The Great Caruso	The Great Caruso grossed $353,000 from 14 key cities.	
22	May 30, 1951	The Great Caruso	The Great Caruso grossed $390,000 from 15 key cities.	
23	June 6, 1951	The Great Caruso		
24	June 13, 1951	The Great Caruso	The Great Caruso grossed $292,000 from the cities sampled.	
25	June 20, 1951	The Great Caruso		
26	June 27, 1951	The Great Caruso		
27	July 4, 1951	The Great Caruso		
28	July 11, 1951	The Great Caruso		
29	July 18, 1951	Show Boat		
30	July 25, 1951	Show Boat		
31	August 1, 1951	Show Boat	Show Boat grossed $464,000 from 20 key cities.	
32	August 8, 1951	Show Boat	Show Boat grossed $380,000 from 15 key cities.	
33	August 15, 1951	That's My Boy	That's My Boy reached number one in its 13th week of release.	
34	August 22, 1951	That's My Boy		
35	August 29, 1951	That's My Boy		
36	September 5, 1951	That's My Boy		
37	September 12, 1951	David and Bathsheba †	David and Bathsheba reached number one in its fourth week of release.	
38	September 19, 1951	David and Bathsheba †		
39	September 26, 1951	David and Bathsheba †	David and Bathsheba grossed $360,000 from 18 key cities.	
40	October 3, 1951	David and Bathsheba †		
41	October 10, 1951	David and Bathsheba †		
42	October 17, 1951	A Place in the Sun	A Place in the Sun reached number one in its ninth week of release.	
43	October 24, 1951	The Desert Fox: The Story of Rommel		
44	October 31, 1951	An American in Paris	An American in Paris reached number one in its fourth week of release.	
45	November 7, 1951	An American in Paris		
46	November 14, 1951	An American in Paris		
47	November 21, 1951	An American in Paris	An American in Paris grossed $310,000 from the cities sampled.	
48	November 28, 1951	Quo Vadis	Quo Vadis reached number one in its fourth week of release.	
49	December 5, 1951	Quo Vadis		
50	December 12, 1951	Quo Vadis		
51	December 19, 1951	Quo Vadis		
52	December 26, 1951	Quo Vadis		

== Highest-grossing films ==
The highest-grossing films during the calendar year based on theatrical rentals were as follows:

Rank	Title	Distributor	Rental
1	David and Bathsheba	20th Century Fox	$7,000,000
2	Show Boat	Metro-Goldwyn-Mayer	$5,200,000
3	An American in Paris	Metro-Goldwyn-Mayer	$4,500,000
4	The Great Caruso	Metro-Goldwyn-Mayer	$4,500,000
5	A Streetcar Named Desire	Warner Bros.	$4,250,000
6	Born Yesterday	Columbia Pictures	$4,150,000
7	That's My Boy	Paramount Pictures	$3,800,000
8	A Place in the Sun	Paramount Pictures	$3,500,000
9	At War with the Army	Paramount Pictures	$3,350,000
10	Father's Little Dividend	Metro-Goldwyn-Mayer	$3,100,000

== See also ==
- Lists of American films — American films by year
- Lists of box office number-one films

== Chronology ==
Preceded by 1950	1951	Succeeded by 1952
