= List of 1954 box office number-one films in the United States =

This is a list of films which placed number one at the weekly box office in the United States during 1954.

== Number-one films ==
†	This implies the highest-grossing movie of the year.

#	Week ending	Film	Notes	Ref
1	January 6, 1954	This Is Cinerama		
2	January 13, 1954	Knights of the Round Table	Knights of the Round Table grossed $338,000 from 11 key cities.	
3	January 20, 1954	Knights of the Round Table	Knights of the Round Table grossed $465,000 from 25 key cities.	
4	January 27, 1954	Knights of the Round Table		
5	February 3, 1954	Knights of the Round Table		
6	February 10, 1954	Knights of the Round Table		
7	February 17, 1954	Knights of the Round Table		
8	February 24, 1954	The Glenn Miller Story	The Glenn Miller Story reached number one in its second week of release.	
9	March 3, 1954	The Glenn Miller Story		
10	March 10, 1954	The Glenn Miller Story	The Glenn Miller Story grossed $400,000 from 20 key cities.	
11	March 17, 1954	The Glenn Miller Story		
12	March 24, 1954	The Glenn Miller Story		
13	March 31, 1954	Rose Marie	Rose Marie reached number one in its fourth week of release.	
14	April 7, 1954	Rose Marie		
15	April 14, 1954	Rose Marie		
16	April 21, 1954	Prince Valiant	Prince Valiant reached number one in its third week of release.	
17	April 28, 1954	Prince Valiant		
18	May 5, 1954	Executive Suite		
19	May 12, 1954	Executive Suite		
20	May 19, 1954	Executive Suite		
21	May 26, 1954	Executive Suite		
22	June 2, 1954	Dial M for Murder		
23	June 9, 1954	Three Coins in the Fountain	Three Coins in the Fountain reached number one in its third week of release.	
24	June 16, 1954	Three Coins in the Fountain		
25	June 23, 1954	Demetrius and the Gladiators	Demetrius and the Gladiators grossed $355,000 from 14 key cities.	
26	June 30, 1954	Demetrius and the Gladiators		
27	July 7, 1954	The Caine Mutiny	The Caine Mutiny reached number one in its second week of release.	
28	July 14, 1954	The Caine Mutiny		
29	July 21, 1954	The Caine Mutiny		
30	July 28, 1954	The Caine Mutiny		
31	August 4, 1954	The Caine Mutiny		
32	August 11, 1954	The Caine Mutiny		
33	August 18, 1954	Magnificent Obsession	Magnificent Obsession reached number one in its second week of release.	
34	August 25, 1954	Seven Brides for Seven Brothers	Seven Brides for Seven Brothers reached number one in its fifth week of release.	
35	September 1, 1954	Seven Brides for Seven Brothers	Seven Brides for Seven Brothers grossed $320,000 from 10 key cities.	
36	September 8, 1954	Dragnet	Dragnet grossed $389,000 from 15 key cities.	
37	September 15, 1954	The Egyptian		
38	September 22, 1954	The Egyptian		
39	September 29, 1954	Sabrina		
40	October 6, 1954	Sabrina		
41	October 13, 1954	Woman's World	Woman's World reached number one in its second week of release.	
42	October 20, 1954	A Star Is Born	A Star Is Born earned $675,000 from 17 key cities in its third week of release.	
43	October 27, 1954	A Star Is Born	A Star Is Born grossed $536,000 from 19 key cities.	
44	November 3, 1954	White Christmas †	White Christmas earned $525,000 from 12 key cities in its third week of release.	
45	November 10, 1954	White Christmas †	White Christmas grossed $525,000 from 12 key cities.	
46	November 17, 1954	White Christmas †	White Christmas grossed $788,000 from 19 key cities.	
47	November 24, 1954	White Christmas †		
48	December 1, 1954	White Christmas †		
49	December 8, 1954	White Christmas †		
50	December 15, 1954	White Christmas †		
51	December 22, 1954	White Christmas †		
52	December 29, 1954	There's No Business Like Show Business	There's No Business Like Show Business reached number one in its second week of release.	

== Highest-grossing films ==
The highest-grossing films during the calendar year based on theatrical rentals were as follows:

Rank	Title	Distributor	Rental
1	White Christmas	Paramount Pictures	$12,000,000
2	The Caine Mutiny	Columbia Pictures	$8,700,000
3	The Glenn Miller Story	Universal-International	$7,000,000
4	The Egyptian	20th Century Fox	$6,000,000
5	Rear Window	Paramount Pictures	$5,300,000
6	The High and the Mighty	Warner Bros.	$5,200,000
7	Magnificent Obsession	Universal-International	$5,000,000
8	Three Coins in the Fountain	20th Century Fox	$5,000,000
9	Seven Brides for Seven Brothers	Metro-Goldwyn-Mayer	$4,750,000
10	Désirée	20th Century Fox	$4,500,000

== See also ==
- Lists of American films — American films by year
- Lists of box office number-one films

== Chronology ==
Preceded by 1953	1954	Succeeded by 1955
