= List of 1955 box office number-one films in the United States =

This is a list of films which placed number one at the weekly box office in the United States during 1955.

== Number-one films ==
†	This implies the highest-grossing movie of the year.

#	Week ending	Film	Notes	Ref
1	January 5, 1955	There's No Business Like Show Business		
2	January 12, 1955	20,000 Leagues Under the Sea	20,000 Leagues Under the Sea reached number one in its third week of release.	
3	January 19, 1955	Vera Cruz	Vera Cruz reached number one in its fourth week of release.	
4	January 26, 1955	20,000 Leagues Under the Sea	20,000 Leagues Under the Sea returned to number one in its fifth week of release.	
5	February 2, 1955	The Bridges at Toko-Ri	The Bridges at Toko-Ri reached number one in its second week of release.	
6	February 9, 1955	The Bridges at Toko-Ri		
7	February 16, 1955	The Bridges at Toko-Ri		
8	February 23, 1955	Battle Cry	Battle Cry reached number one in its third week of release.	
9	March 2, 1955	The Country Girl	The Country Girl reached number one in its ninth week of release.	
10	March 9, 1955	Battle Cry	Battle Cry returned to number one in its fifth week of release.	
11	March 16, 1955	The Country Girl	The Country Girl returned to number one in its eleventh week of release.	
12	March 23, 1955	The Country Girl		
13	March 30, 1955	The Country Girl		
14	April 6, 1955	The Country Girl		
15	April 13, 1955	A Man Called Peter	A Man Called Peter grossed $400,000 from 20 key cities.	
16	April 20, 1955	East of Eden	East of Eden reached number one in its second week of release.	
17	April 27, 1955	Blackboard Jungle	Blackboard Jungle reached number one in its fifth week of release.	
18	May 4, 1955	Blackboard Jungle		
19	May 11, 1955	The Prodigal	The Prodigal grossed $200,000 from the cities sampled.	
20	May 18, 1955	Blackboard Jungle	Blackboard Jungle returned to number one in its eighth week of release.	
21	May 25, 1955	Strategic Air Command	Strategic Air Command reached number one in its ninth week of release.	
22	June 1, 1955	Strategic Air Command		
23	June 8, 1955	Strategic Air Command		
24	June 15, 1955	Love Me or Leave Me	Love Me or Leave Me reached number one in its third week of release.	
25	June 22, 1955	Love Me or Leave Me		
26	June 29, 1955	The Seven Year Itch	The Seven Year Itch reached number one in its fourth week of release.	
27	July 6, 1955	The Seven Year Itch		
28	July 13, 1955	Not as a Stranger	Not as a Stranger reached number one in its second week of release.	
29	July 20, 1955	Not as a Stranger	Not as a Stranger grossed $350,000 from 23 key cities.	
30	July 27, 1955	Mister Roberts		
31	August 3, 1955	Mister Roberts	Mister Roberts grossed $600,000 from the cities sampled.	
32	August 10, 1955	Mister Roberts	Mister Roberts grossed $500,000 from 24 key cities.	
33	August 17, 1955	Mister Roberts		
34	August 24, 1955	Mister Roberts	Mister Roberts grossed $500,000 from 21 key cities.	
35	August 31, 1955	To Catch a Thief	To Catch a Thief reached number one in its fourth week of release.	
36	September 7, 1955	To Catch a Thief		
37	September 14, 1955	To Catch a Thief		
38	September 21, 1955	Cinerama Holiday †	Cinerama Holiday reached number one in its 32nd week of release.	
39	September 28, 1955	Cinerama Holiday †		
40	October 5, 1955	To Hell and Back	To Hell and Back reached number one in its seventh week of release.	
41	October 12, 1955	To Hell and Back		
42	October 19, 1955	To Hell and Back	To Hell and Back grossed $400,000 from 17 key cities.	
43	October 26, 1955	To Hell and Back	To Hell and Back grossed $300,000 from 13 key cities.	
44	November 2, 1955	Trial	Trial reached number one in its fourth week of release.	
45	November 9, 1955	Cinerama Holiday †	Cinerama Holiday returned to number one in its 39th week of release.	
46	November 16, 1955	Guys and Dolls	Guys and Dolls reached number one in its second week of release.	
47	November 23, 1955	Guys and Dolls		
48	November 30, 1955	The Tender Trap	The Tender Trap reached number one in its fourth week of release.	
49	December 7, 1955	The Tender Trap		
50	December 14, 1955	Guys and Dolls	Guys and Dolls reached number one in its sixth week of release.	
51	December 21, 1955	Cinerama Holiday †	Cinerama Holiday returned to number one in its 45th week of release.	
52	December 28, 1955	Guys and Dolls	Guys and Dolls returned to number one in its eighth week of release.	

== Highest-grossing films ==
The highest-grossing films during the calendar year based on theatrical rentals were as follows:

Rank	Title	Distributor	Rental
1	Cinerama Holiday	Cinerama Releasing Corporation	$10,000,000
2	Mister Roberts	Warner Bros. Pictures	$8,500,000
3	Battle Cry	Warner Bros. Pictures	$8,000,000
4	20,000 Leagues Under the Sea	Walt Disney/Buena Vista Distribution	$8,000,000
5	Not as a Stranger	United Artists	$7,100,000
6	The Country Girl	Paramount Pictures	$6,900,000
7	Lady and the Tramp	Walt Disney/Buena Vista Distribution	$6,500,000
8	Strategic Air Command	Paramount Pictures	$6,500,000
9	To Hell and Back	Universal Pictures	$6,000,000
10	The Sea Chase	Warner Bros. Pictures	$6,000,000

== See also ==
- Lists of American films — American films by year
- Lists of box office number-one films

== Chronology ==
Preceded by 1954	1955	Succeeded by 1956
