= Sorrowful Jones =

1949 film by Sidney Lanfield

- 1949 movie poster
- Directed by: Sidney Lanfield
- Screenplay by: Melville Shavelson; Edmund Hartmann; Jack Rose
- Story by: Damon Runyon
- Produced by: Robert L. Welch
- Starring: Bob Hope; Lucille Ball; William Demarest; Mary Jane Saunders
- Cinematography: Daniel L. Fapp
- Edited by: Arthur P. Schmidt
- Music by: Robert Emmett Dolan
- Distributed by: Paramount Pictures
- Release date: June 5, 1949 (New York City)
- Running time: 88 min.
- Country: United States
- Language: English
- Box office: $3.4 million

Sorrowful Jones, also known as Damon Runyon's Sorrowful Jones, is a 1949 American comedy-drama film directed by Sidney Lanfield. The film stars Lucille Ball and Bob Hope.

Sorrowful Jones was a remake of a 1934 Shirley Temple film, Little Miss Marker. In the film, a young girl is left with the notoriously cheap Sorrowful Jones (Hope) as a marker for a bet. When her father does not return, he learns that caring for a child interferes with his free-wheeling lifestyle. Lucille Ball plays a nightclub singer who is dating Sorrowful's boss. Ball's singing voice is provided by Annette Warren, who also sang for her in Fancy Pants and later provided the singing voice for Ava Gardner in Show Boat.

== Plot ==
Sorrowful Jones is a New York bookie who hides his operation behind a trap door in a Broadway barber shop. He suffers from a financial setback when a horse named Dreamy Joe, owned by gangster Big Steve Holloway, unexpectedly wins a race. Jones has to pay all the many customers betting on the horse to win, which empties his pockets completely.

When visiting a nightclub, Jones learns that the race was fixed by Big Steve, who tells him about giving the horse a speedball. Big Steve has informed all the bookies in his circle of friends about the fixed race and demands a sum of $1,000 from each one in exchange for this information.

Before the next race, Jones gets information that Dreamy Joe will lose but still takes bets on the horse from his customers. He even takes bets with marker payment from gambler Orville Smith, who leaves his daughter Martha Jane, four years old, as collateral for the bet. Things get even more complicated when Orville is killed by one of Big Steve's goons, Once Over Sam, because Orville overheard a phone call in which Big Steve revealed that the race is fixed. Because of Orville's demise, Jones is forced to take care of Martha Jane and brings her home with him. The next day Jones gets help from his ex-girlfriend, burlesque performer Gladys O'Neill, to take care of the little girl.

Big Steve visits Jones and tells him he is quitting the race-fixing business since the racing commission is investigating him. Big Steve plans to fix one final race so that Dreamy Joe will win. He also transfers the horse's ownership to Martha Jane, unaware that the girl is Orville's daughter. After the race, Big Steve will kill the horse by giving it a too high dose of speedball.

Jones tries to find Martha Jane's mother but finds out that she is dead. Gladys suggests that Jones give all of Dreamy Joe's winnings to Martha Jane to help her survive, or she will contact the police and tell them about Jones' operation. She does not know Big Steve's plan to fix the race. Big Steve discovers that Martha Jane is Orville's daughter, so Jones must hide her to protect her from getting killed. When hiding on a fire escape landing, Martha Jane falls and is seriously injured. While in a coma, the little girl calls out for Dreamy Joe. To save Martha Jane and wake her up, Jones and his partner Regret steal the horse from Big Steve at the race track. They take it into the hospital room where Martha Jane lies. Martha Jane wakes up, and the police discover that Big Steve is responsible for Orville's murder.

After Big Steve is arrested, Jones proposes to Gladys. The police want Martha Jane to be placed in an orphanage, but Jones and Gladys, who have married, decide to adopt the girl. They go away on their honeymoon together with their newly adopted daughter.

== Cast ==
- Bob Hope as Sorrowful Jones
- Lucille Ball as Gladys
- Bruce Cabot as Big Steve
- William Demarest as Regret
- Mary Jane Saunders as Martha Jane

== Release ==
The film opened at the Paramount Theatre in New York City on Sunday, June 5, 1949; the first film to open at the Paramount on a Sunday for 23 years. It was paired with a performance by the Louis Prima orchestra, also featuring his future wife, Keely Smith, and grossed $85,000 in its opening week. In its fourth week of release it grossed over $260,000 and became number one in the United States. It went on general release in the United States on July 4, 1949, and remained at the top of the box office for the next three weeks, tied initially with Neptune's Daughter and then The Girl from Jones Beach.

== See also ==
- List of films about horses
