= Quo Vadis (1951 film) =

1951 film by Mervyn LeRoy

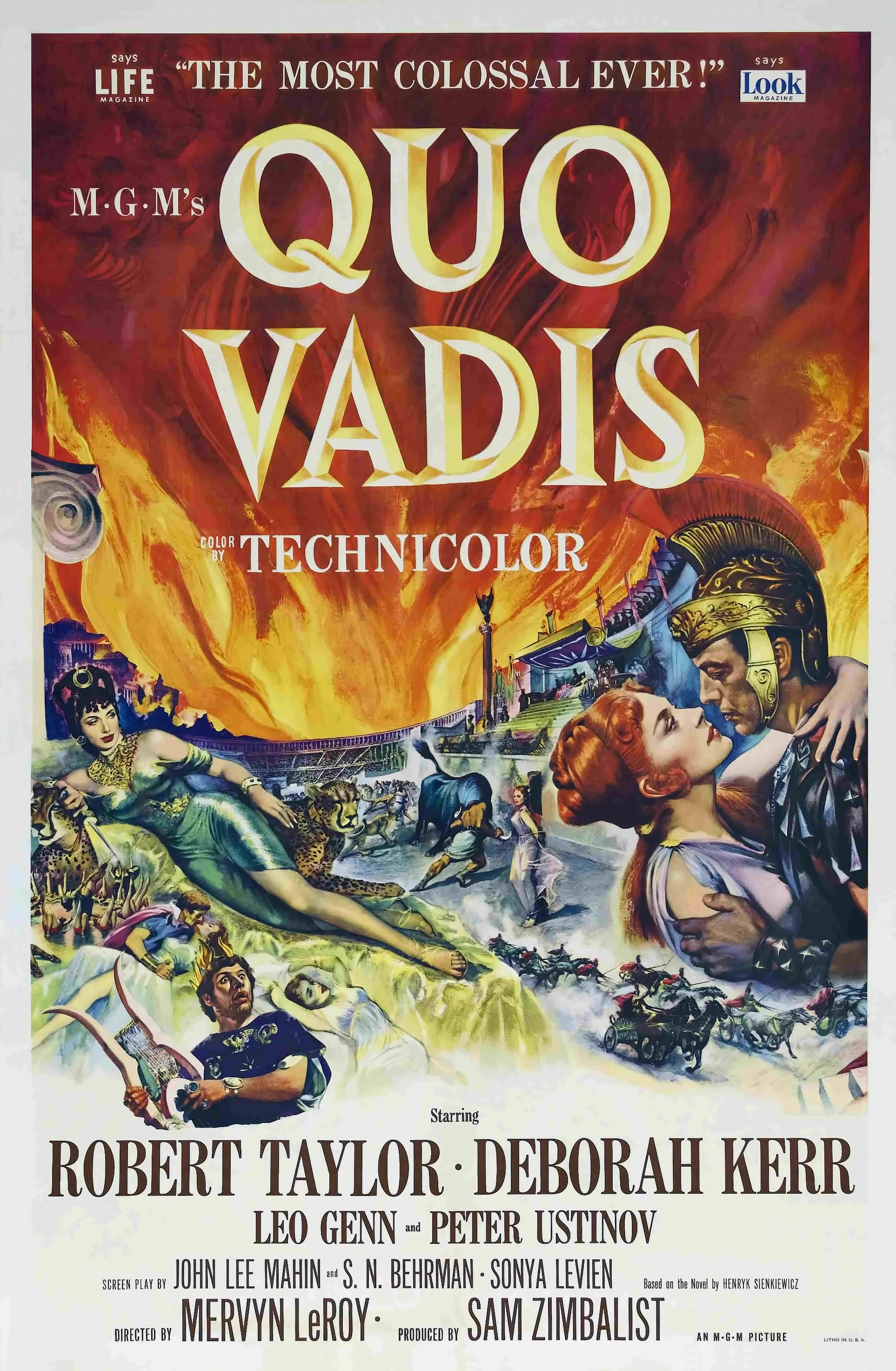
- Theatrical release poster
- Directed by: Mervyn LeRoy
- Screenplay by: S. N. Behrman; Sonya Levien; John Lee Mahin
- Based on: Quo Vadis; 1896 novel by Henryk Sienkiewicz
- Produced by: Sam Zimbalist
- Starring: Robert Taylor; Deborah Kerr; Leo Genn; Peter Ustinov
- Cinematography: Robert Surtees; William V. Skall
- Edited by: Ralph E. Winters
- Music by: Miklós Rózsa
- Production company: Metro-Goldwyn-Mayer
- Distributed by: Loew's, Inc.
- Release date: November 2, 1951
- Running time: 171 minutes
- Country: United States
- Language: English
- Budget: $7.6 million
- Box office: $21 million

Quo Vadis (Latin for "Where are you going?") is a 1951 American religious epic historical film set in ancient Rome during the final years of Emperor Nero's reign, based on the 1896 novel of the same title by Polish Nobel Laureate author Henryk Sienkiewicz. Produced by Metro-Goldwyn-Mayer and filmed in Technicolor, it was directed by Mervyn LeRoy from a screenplay by S. N. Behrman, Sonya Levien, and John Lee Mahin. It is the fourth screen adaptation of Sienkiewicz's novel. The film stars Robert Taylor, Deborah Kerr, Leo Genn, and Peter Ustinov, and features Patricia Laffan, Finlay Currie, Abraham Sofaer, Marina Berti, Buddy Baer, and Felix Aylmer. Future Italian stars Sophia Loren and Bud Spencer appeared as uncredited extras. The score is by Miklós Rózsa and the cinematography by Robert Surtees and William V. Skall. The film was released by Metro-Goldwyn-Mayer on November 2, 1951.

The story, set between 64 and 68 AD, combines both historical and fictional events and characters, and compresses the key events of that period into the space of only a few weeks. Its main theme is the Roman Empire’s conflict with Christianity and the persecution of Christians in the final years of the Julio-Claudian line. Unlike his illustrious and powerful predecessor, Emperor Claudius, Nero proved corrupt and destructive, and his actions eventually threatened to destroy Rome's previously peaceful social order. The title refers to an incident in the apocryphal Acts of Peter.

The film was nominated for eight Academy Awards, including Best Picture, and it was such a huge box office success that it was credited with single-handedly rescuing MGM from the brink of bankruptcy. Peter Ustinov won the Golden Globe Award for Best Supporting Actor – Motion Picture, and Robert Surtees and William V. Skall won the award for Best Cinematography.

== Plot ==
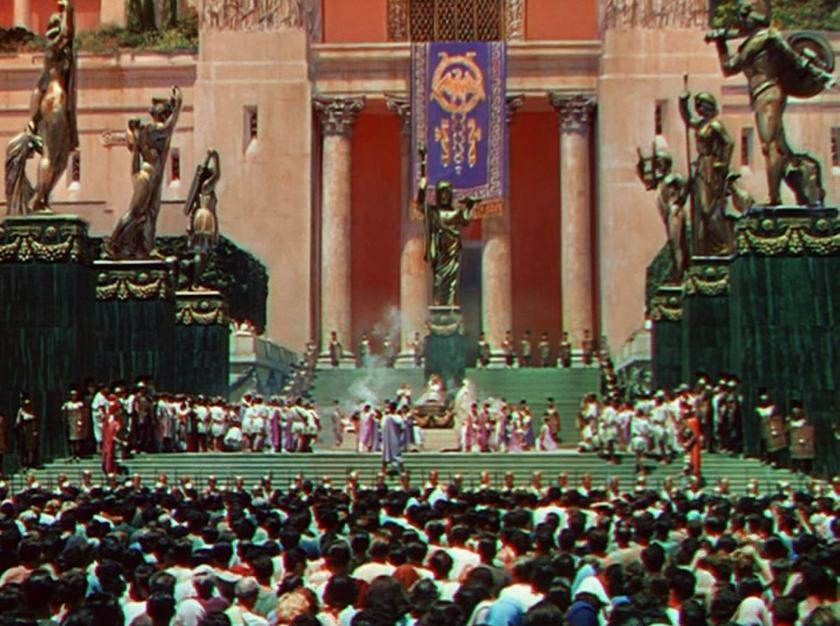
Scene from Quo Vadis

Marcus Vinicius is a Roman military commander and the legate of the XIV Gemina. Returning from wars in Britain and Gaul, he stays in the house of Aulus Plautius, a retired Roman general, and becomes smitten with Lygia, a Lygian hostage of Rome in the old general's care. Unbeknownst to Marcus, Lygia, Aulus, and his household are devout Christians, who host Paul the Apostle that very night. Petronius, Marcus' uncle, persuades Nero to give the girl to his nephew as a reward for his services. Lygia resents this arrangement, but eventually falls in love with Marcus.

Meanwhile, Nero's atrocities become increasingly outrageous and his behavior more irrational. After Nero burns Rome and blames the Christians, Marcus sets out to rescue Lygia and her family. Nero arrests them, along with all the other Christians, and condemns them to be slaughtered in his Circus; some are killed by lions. Petronius, Nero's most trusted advisor, warns him that the Christians will be celebrated as martyrs, but he cannot change the emperor's mind. Then, tired of Nero's insanity and suspecting that he may be about to turn on him, too, Petronius composes a letter to Nero expressing his derision for the emperor (which he previously had concealed to avoid being murdered by him) and commits suicide by severing an artery in his wrist. His slavegirl Eunice (who has fallen in love with him) elects to die with him, despite being freed. The Christian apostle Peter has also been arrested after returning to Rome in response to a sign from the Lord, and he marries Marcus and Lygia in the Circus prisons. Peter is later crucified upside-down, a form of execution conceived by Nero's Praetorian Guard as an expression of mockery.

Poppaea, Nero's wife, who lusts after Marcus, devises a diabolical revenge for his rejection of her. Lygia is tied to a stake in the Circus and a wild bull is released into the arena. Lygia's bodyguard Ursus must attempt to kill the bull with his bare hands to save Lygia from being gored to death. Marcus is taken to the emperor's box and forced to watch. This act outrages his loyal officers who are among the spectators. Ursus is able to topple the bull, though, and break its neck. At that moment Marcus manages to break free from his bonds and leaps into the arena to get to Lygia. Massively impressed by Ursus's victory and seeing that Lygia is the beloved of Marcus who is still regarded as a great war hero, the crowd exhorts Nero to spare the couple. He refuses to do so, even after four of his courtiers, Seneca, architect Phaon, poet Lucan, and musician Terpnos add their endorsement of the mob's demands. The decision enrages the crowd and Marcus's loyal troop members rush to the arena to save the three. Marcus accuses Nero of burning Rome and announces that General Galba is at that moment marching on the city, intent on replacing Nero, and hails him as new Emperor of Rome.

The crowd revolts, now firmly believing that Nero, not the Christians, is responsible for the burning of Rome. Nero flees to his palace, where he strangles Poppaea, blaming her for inciting him to scapegoat the Christians. Then Acte, Nero's discarded mistress who is still in love with him, appears and offers him a dagger to end his own life before the mob storming the palace kills him. Nero cannot do it, so Acte helps him to push the dagger into his chest, and he dies.

Marcus, Lygia, and Ursus are now free, and they leave Rome for Marcus' estate in Sicily to begin a new life together. By the roadside, Peter's crook, which he had left behind when he returned to Rome, has sprouted blossoms. A radiant light appears and a chorus intones, "I am the way, the truth, and the life," words spoken by Jesus (John 14:6, New Testament).

== Cast ==
- Robert Taylor as Marcus Vinicius
- Deborah Kerr as Lygia
- Leo Genn as Petronius
- Peter Ustinov as Emperor Nero
- Patricia Laffan as Poppaea Sabina
- Finlay Currie as Saint Peter
- Abraham Sofaer as Paul
- Marina Berti as Eunice
- Buddy Baer as Ursus
- Felix Aylmer as Plautius
- Nora Swinburne as Pomponia
- Ralph Truman as Tigellinus
- Norman Wooland as Nerva
- Peter Miles as Nazarius
- Geoffrey Dunn as Terpnos
- Nicholas Hannen as Seneca
- D. A. Clarke-Smith as Phaon
- Rosalie Crutchley as Acte
- John Ruddock as Chilo
- Arthur Walge as Croton
- Elspeth March as Miriam
- Strelsa Brown as Rufia
- Alfredo Varelli as Lucan
- Roberto Ottaviano as Flavius
- William Tubbs as Anaxander
- Pietro Tordi as Galba

The film features many uncredited supporting parts and cameos: including Elizabeth Taylor as a Christian prisoner in arena, Sophia Loren as a Lygian slave, Christopher Lee as a chariot driver, Clelia Matania as Parmenida the hairdresser, Marika Aba as the Assyrian Dancer at Nero's banquet, Richard Garrick as a slave with Marcus at Triumph, Giuseppe Tosi as a wrestler at Nero's banquet, Adrienne Corri as an imprisoned Christian woman, Bud Spencer as an Imperial Guard, and Robin Hughes as Jesus in a flashback tableau. The narration was provided by an uncredited Walter Pidgeon.

== Production ==
=== Pre-production ===
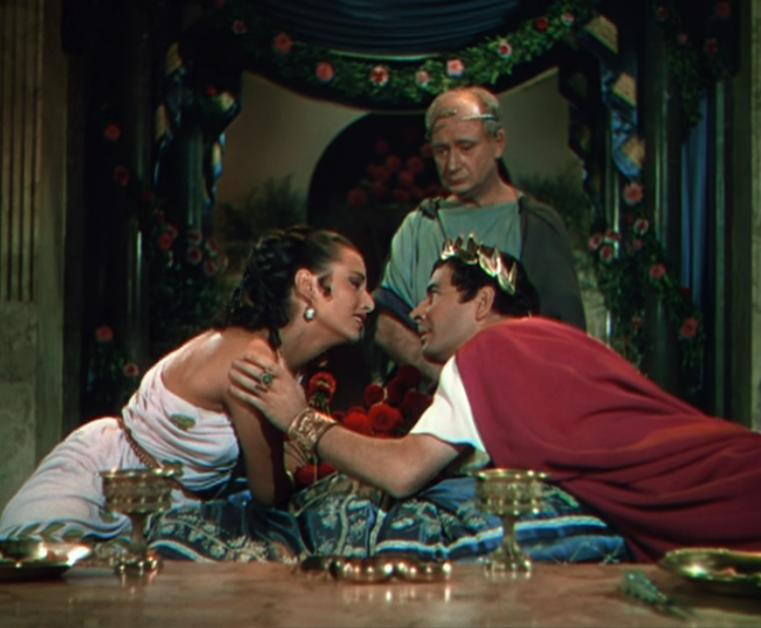
Screenshot of Marina Berti & Leo Genn from the trailer for the film Quo Vadis

In the late 1930s, MGM bought the talking-picture rights to the 1896 novel Quo Vadis from author Henryk Sienkiewicz's heirs. (At the same time they had to buy the 1924 silent-screen version.) The company originally intended to make the film in Italy, but the outbreak of WWII caused it to be postponed. After the war, production was restarted. A lease was obtained on the huge Cinecitta Studios, eight miles outside Rome, with its 148 acres and nine soundstages.

After months of preparation, the art director, costume designer, and set decorator arrived in Rome in 1948. Construction of the outdoor sets began at once: the huge Circus of Nero and exterior of Nero's palace, a whole section of Ancient Rome, a great bridge, and the Plautius villa. The manufacture of thousands of costumes for extras began, along with drapes and carpets, metal and glass goblets, and 10 chariots. Official permission was granted to refurbish a section of the Appian Way. One of Hollywood's foremost animal experts began to procure lions, horses, bulls, and other animals from around Europe. Well in advance of filming, the producer, director, chief cinematographer, and casting director arrived in Rome. The film finally went into production on May 22, 1950.

=== Casting ===
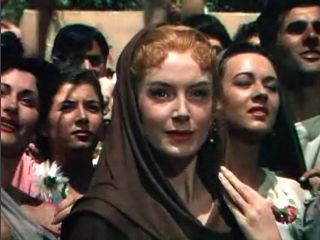
Deborah Kerr as Lygia

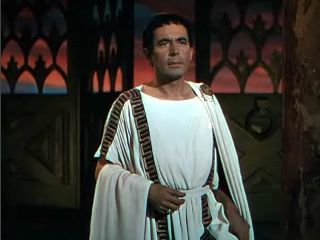
Leo Genn as Petronius

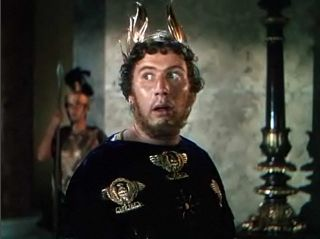
Peter Ustinov as Nero

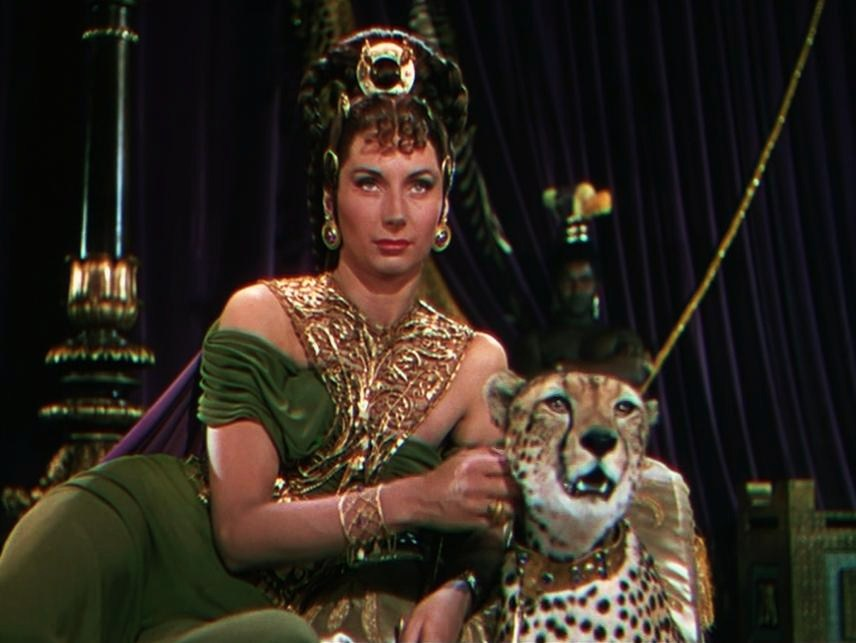
Patricia Laffan as Poppaea

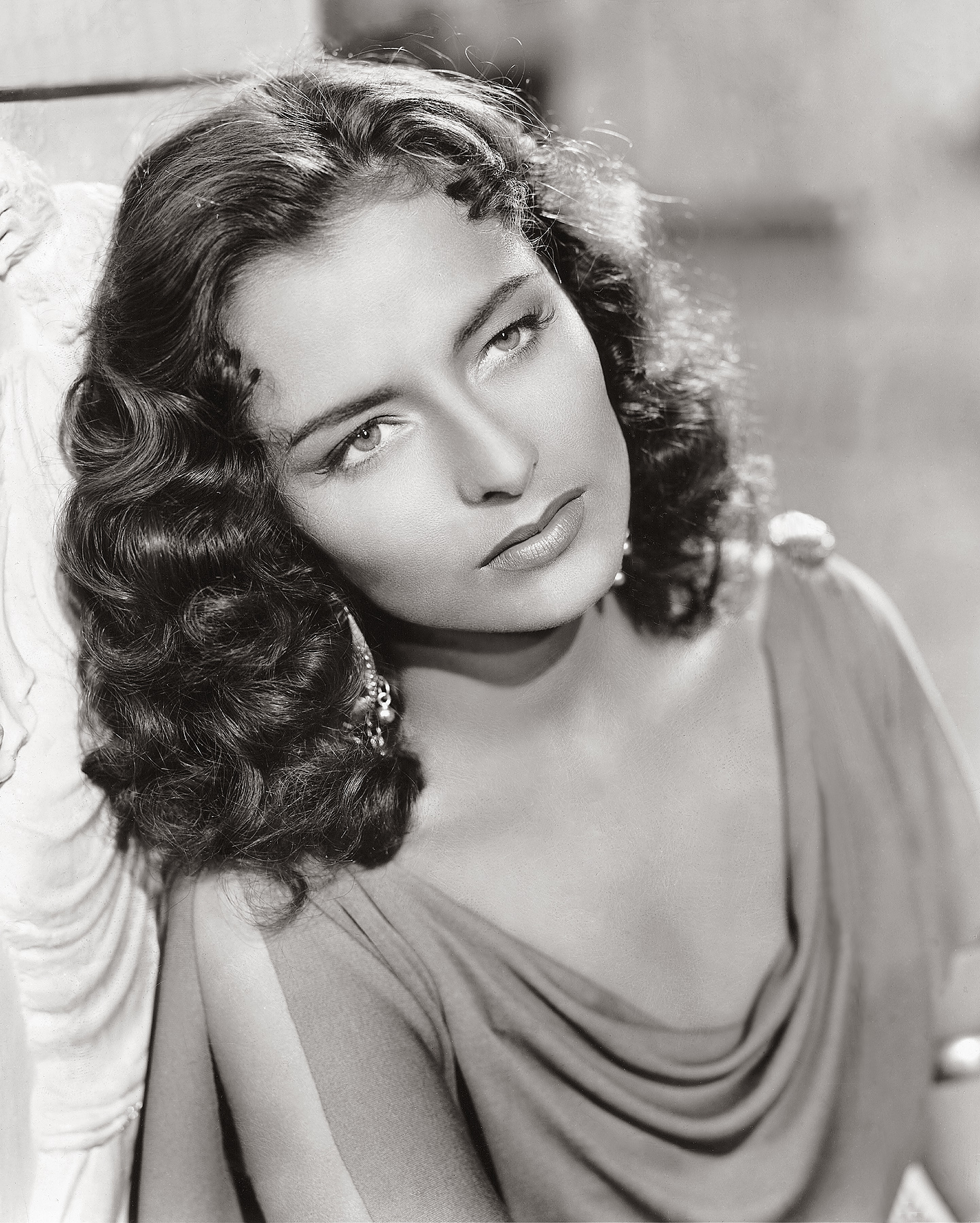
Publicity photo of Marina Berti as Eunice

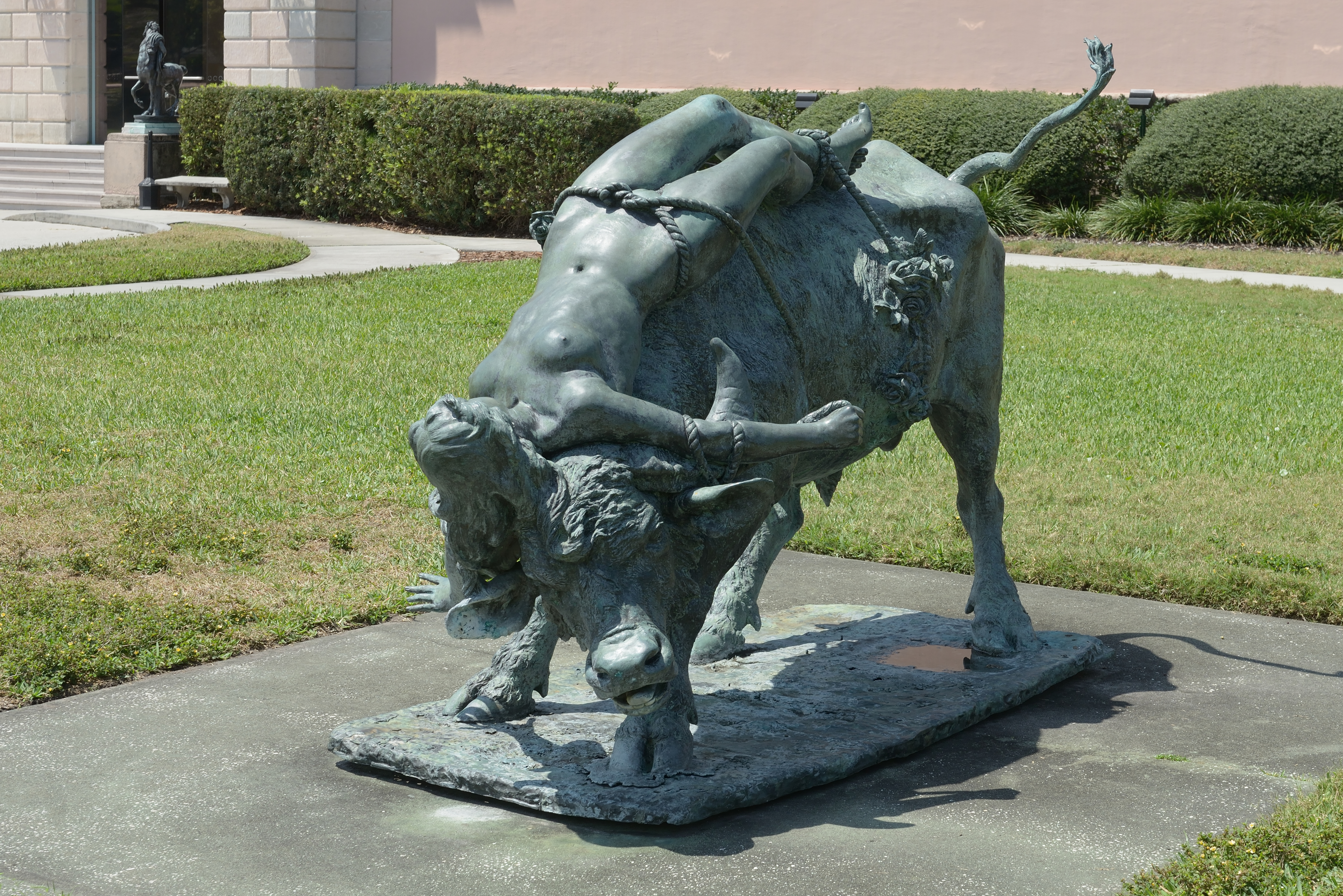
Ringling Museum Sarasota, Florida: Bronze statue of Lygia tied to the bull by Giuseppe Moretti

The film was originally cast in 1949 with Elizabeth Taylor as Lygia and Gregory Peck as Marcus Vinicius. When the production changed hands the following year, the roles went to Deborah Kerr and Robert Taylor. Elizabeth Taylor had an uncredited cameo role as a Christian in the Circus prisons.

Although most of the cast was British and a few Italian (Marina Berti, Alfredo Varelli, Roberto Ottaviano), Robert Taylor was certainly not the only American. Others included Buddy Baer (Ursus), Peter Miles (Nazarius), Arthur Walge (Croton), and William Tubbs (Anaxander). Also, several were among the uncredited cast; perhaps the most notable of these was 70-year-old Irish-American character actor Richard Garrick as the public slave who stands behind Marcus in his Triumph chariot, holding a victory laurel above his head, and repeating "Remember thou art only a man."

Ustinov recalled how he was cast as Nero in 1949:

An exciting proposition came my way when I was 28 years old. MGM were going to remake Quo Vadis, and I was a candidate for the role of Nero. Arthur Hornblow was to be the producer, and I was tested by [the director] John Huston. I threw everything I knew into this test, and to my surprise, John Huston did little to restrain me, encouraging me in confidential whispers to be even madder. Apparently the test was a success, but then the huge machine came to a halt, and the project was postponed for a year. At the end of the year, the producer was Sam Zimbalist and the director Mervyn LeRoy. They also approved my test, but warned me in a wire that I might be found to be a little young for the part. I cabled back that if they postponed again, I might be too old, since Nero died at 31. A second cable from them read "Historical Research Has Proved You Correct Stop The Part Is Yours."

Clark Gable turned down the role of Marcus Vinicius very early in the film's production history because he thought he would look ridiculous in Roman costumes.

Sophia Loren appeared in the film as an extra. Italian star Bud Spencer (real name: Carlo Pedersoli) also had an uncredited extra role as a Praetorian guardsman inside Nero's summer palace at Antium. (He answers Nero, but his voice may be dubbed.)

Audrey Hepburn, still widely unknown when the film was released, was considered for the part of Lygia. Director Mervyn LeRoy wanted to cast her, but the role went to established MGM contract star Deborah Kerr. Wardrobe stills of her in costume for the film still exist.

Patricia Laffan was selected by the producer and director for the major role of Poppaea after they watched a screen test she made for a smaller part in the film.

Ustinov relates in his autobiography Dear Me that director Mervyn LeRoy summarized the manner in which he envisioned Ustinov should play the Emperor Nero, very salaciously, as

"Nero ... The way I see him ... He's a guy plays with himself nights." At the time I thought it a preposterous assessment, but a little later I was not so sure. It was a profundity at its most workaday level, and it led me to the eventual conviction that no nation can make Roman pictures as well as the Americans ... The inevitable vulgarities of the script contributed as much to its authenticity as its rare felicities. I felt then as I feel today, in spite of the carping of critical voices, that Quo Vadis, good or bad according to taste, was an extraordinarily authentic film, and the nonsense Nero was sometimes made to speak was very much like the nonsense Nero probably did speak.

=== Filming ===
Produced for $7 million, it was the most expensive film ever made at the time. It became MGM's largest grosser since Gone with the Wind (1939). Filmed at the sprawling Cinecitta Studios that had been opened by Benito Mussolini in 1937 as part of the dictator's master plan to make Rome the pre-eminent world capital. (Mussolini's son Vittorio Mussolini and Hollywood producer Hal Roach negotiated to form the R.A.M. ["Roach and Mussolini"] Corporation later in 1937, which was ultimately aborted. This business alliance with the Fascist state horrified 1930s Hollywood moguls and ultimately led to Roach defecting from his MGM distribution deal to United Artists in 1938.)

Filming in postwar Italy offered American studios immense facilities and cheap Italian labor and extras, of which thousands were required. Hollywood returned to Cinecitta often, producing many of its biggest spectacles there, including Helen of Troy (1956), Ben-Hur (1959), and Cleopatra (1963), with the latter two dwarfing Quo Vadis in scale. The studio would later be used by many Italian producers and directors, including Federico Fellini. The first use of the phrase "Hollywood on the Tiber", which has come to refer to a golden era of American runaway film production in Italy, was as the title of a Time article in the issue dated June 26, 1950, published while Quo Vadis was being shot in Rome.

Composer Miklós Rózsa said that he wrote most of his score at the Culver City studios while the film was being shot in Italy:

[The] rushes were being sent back to Hollywood for cutting at the same time as they were being cut back in Rome ... I set to work so that at least something was ready, even if it had to be modified later. I worked with the chief supervising editor, Margaret Booth, whose technical knowledge is incomparable ... Finally, the Rome contingent arrived home with their version. It wasn't so very different from the one that Margaret had put together, and there were no insuperable problems. Sam Zimbalist was amazed and delighted that I had all the music ready in three weeks, thanks to the work Margaret and I had already done.

Ten Italian locations were used in the film. With the exception of the Via Appia, most of these have not been identified, but the final stage of the chariot chase was filmed along the 2000-year-old Viale dei Cipressi (Avenue of Cypresses) near the village Bolgheri. This landmark in Livorno Province, Tuscany, is easily recognizable.

In the summer of 1950, when Quo Vadis was in production, Rome was in the grip of an intense heatwave, as Peter Ustinov recalled: "Rome was in the throes of Holy Year, and bursting with pilgrims. It was also one of the hottest summers on record." The heat affected not only the cast and crew, but also the lions. Mervyn LeRoy recalled that because of the heat, the lions were reluctant to enter the arena.

Due to equipment shortages in Italy, MGM had to import a reported two hundred tons of generators, lights and other electrical equipment from Culver City. The film holds the record for the most costumes used in one movie: 32,000.

At one point in the film, Nero shows his court a scale model illustrating his plans for the rebuilding of Rome as a new city to be called Neropolis. Studio publicity claimed that this was the model of Ancient Rome housed in the Museum of Roman Civilization and that it had been borrowed from the Italian government. (This was originally constructed by Mussolini's government for a 1937 exhibition of Roman architecture.) However, the museum model is of fourth-century Rome, not of first-century Rome as it would have looked when rebuilt after the Great Fire of AD 64. The screen model looks nothing like the museum model. (It was almost certainly constructed especially for the film – perhaps by its special effects model-maker, Donald Jahraus.)

Anthony Mann worked on the film as an uncredited second-unit director. He spent 24 nights (four working weeks) on the Cinecitta backlot shooting scenes for the Burning of Rome sequence. However, he was not the co-director of the film, as some of his admirers have claimed. The soundstage scenes for the same sequence were directed by Mervyn LeRoy.

== Reception ==
=== Box-office performance ===
The film was a major commercial success. It was number one at the US box office for 6 consecutive weeks and 11 weeks in total. According to MGM's records, during its initial theatrical release, it earned $11,143,000 in the U.S. and Canada and $9,894,000 elsewhere, making it the highest-grossing film of 1951, and resulting in a profit to the studio of $5,440,000.

=== Critical reaction ===
Bosley Crowther of The New York Times wrote in a mixed review, "Here is a staggering combination of cinema brilliance and sheer banality, of visual excitement and verbal boredom, of historical pretentiousness and sex." Crowther thought that even Cecil B. DeMille's The Sign of the Cross "had nothing to match the horrendous and morbid spectacles of human brutality and destruction that Director Mervyn LeRoy has got in this. But within and around these visual triumphs and rich imagistic displays is tediously twined a hackneyed romance that threatens to set your teeth on edge." Variety wrote that the film was "right up there with Birth of a Nation and Gone With the Wind for box-office performance. It has size, scope, splash, and dash, giving for the first time in a long while credence to the now-clichéd 'super-colossal' term. This is a super-spectacle in all its meaning." Edwin Schallert of the Los Angeles Times declared it "one of the most tremendous if not the greatest pictures ever made ... Its pictorial lavishness has never been equaled in any other production." Richard L. Coe of The Washington Post called it "a fabulously entertaining movie. Though the expansive, expensive film from the celebrated novel runs over three hours on the Palace screen, you won't believe you've been there nearly that long." Harrison's Reports declared, "For sheer opulence, massiveness of sets, size of cast, and beauty of Technicolor photography, no picture ever produced matches 'Quo Vadis'. It is a super-collosal [sic] spectacle in every sense of the meaning, and on that score alone it is worth a premium price of admission." The Monthly Film Bulletin was negative, writing that the film "demonstrates how inordinately boring the convention of size and spectacle can be, when divorced from taste, feeling, and, to a surprising extent, creative talent. The film is unimaginatively directed, at a very slow pace in keeping with the general larger than life proportions, and its technical qualities are not impressive."

The film holds a score of 83% on Rotten Tomatoes based on 63 reviews, with an average rating of 6.50/10. The website’s consensus reads: "Summoning all the pageantry and scale Hollywood can muster before letting a corker of a performance by Peter Ustinov run roughshod over it, Quo Vadis? realizes Rome on the big screen in all its gaudy and spectacular glory."

=== Awards and nominations ===
Award	Category	Nominee(s)	Result	Ref.
Academy Awards	Best Motion Picture	Sam Zimbalist	Nominated	
Academy Awards	Best Supporting Actor	Leo Genn	Nominated	
Academy Awards	Best Supporting Actor	Peter Ustinov	Nominated	
Academy Awards	Best Art Direction – Color	Art Direction: William A. Horning, Cedric Gibbons, and Edward Carfagno; Set Decoration: Hugh Hunt	Nominated	
Academy Awards	Best Cinematography – Color	Robert Surtees and William V. Skall	Nominated	
Academy Awards	Best Costume Design – Color	Herschel McCoy	Nominated	
Academy Awards	Best Film Editing	Ralph E. Winters	Nominated	
Academy Awards	Best Scoring of a Dramatic or Comedy Picture	Miklós Rózsa	Nominated	
Directors Guild of America Awards	Outstanding Directorial Achievement in Motion Pictures	Mervyn LeRoy	Nominated	
Golden Globe Awards	Best Motion Picture – Drama		Nominated	
Golden Globe Awards	Best Supporting Actor – Motion Picture	Peter Ustinov	Won	
Golden Globe Awards	Best Cinematography – Color	Robert Surtees and William V. Skall	Won	
International Film Music Critics Association Awards	Best Archival Re-Recording of an Existing Score	Miklós Rózsa (composer); Nic Raine (conductor); James Fitzpatrick and Luc Van De Ven (producers); Ginko Digi (art director); Frank K. DeWald (liner notes)	Won	
National Board of Review Awards	Top 10 Films		9th Place	

== Music ==
The music score by Miklós Rózsa is notable for its historical authenticity. Since no Ancient Roman music had survived, Rózsa incorporated a number of fragments of Ancient Greek and Jewish melodies such as the Seikilos epitaph, the Hymn to Nemesis and Hymn to the Sun by Mesomedes into his own choral-orchestral score.

- In 1950, before film production began, Rózsa made prerecordings of numerous fanfares, marches, songs and dances with the M-G-M Studio Orchestra in Culver City, and these survive. In 1951, he recorded the full score at M-G-M's British studios with the Royal Philharmonic Orchestra, but these recordings were reportedly lost later on in a fire at the Culver City studios. However, 'dubdowns' of all of those recordings that were used in the film (about two-thirds with added sound effects) do survive. In 1951, MGM Records issued gramophone discs, in three different editions and speeds, of 12 tracks from the original soundtrack music (without sound effects). Consequently, much of the original recorded score is still available in various formats. In 2009, Film Score Monthly collected and issued these elements on two CDs.
- In 1963, MGM Records brought out a stereo compilation of excerpts from Rózsa's film scores played by the Symphony Orchestra of Rome, conducted by Rózsa and Carlo Savina. Rózsa conducted the Triumphal March.
- In 1967, Rózsa conducted the Nuremberg Symphony Orchestra in a stereo compilation of excerpts from his epic film scores. This included three selections from Quo Vadis.
- In 1977, Rózsa made a stereo recording of 12 selections from his score, once again conducting the Royal Philharmonic Orchestra.
- In 2012, Nic Raine, conducting the City of Prague Philharmonic Orchestra, recorded the entire score (a total of 38 tracks on two CDs). This included several pieces of music that were originally recorded by Rózsa, but not used on the film's soundtrack.

At the end of the film, a triumphal march heralds the success of the armies of the new emperor, Galba. This theme would be reused by Rózsa in Ben-Hur (1959) as the brief "Bread and Circuses March" preceding "The Parade of the Charioteers", prior to the famous chariot race.

In his 1982 autobiography, Miklós Rózsa expressed his regret at the way his score was handled by producer Sam Zimbalist, 'a dear personal friend': "[He] didn't use the music in any way as effectively as he might have done. After all the trouble I went to, much of my work was swamped by sound effects, or played at such a low level as to be indistinguishable ... It was a great disappointment to me." However, he was mistaken when he wrote: "Quo Vadis, because it was produced abroad, was completely boycotted by Hollywood and received no Academy nominations." Although it did not win any Academy Awards, it did, in fact, receive eight nominations – including one for Rózsa's score.

Rózsa's love theme for Lygia ("Lygia") was set to words by Paul Francis Webster and Mario Lanza sang it for the first time on his radio show broadcast of January 1952.

== Home media ==
- A two-disc special edition of the movie was released on DVD in the U.S. on November 11, 2008, after a long photochemical restoration process.
- A high-definition Blu-ray version was released March 17, 2009.

== Comic-book adaptation ==
- Thriller Comics No 19, July 1952 (Amalgamated Press, London) Full-color photo-cover [image reversed] • 64 pages in black-and-white (Adapted by Joan Whitford • Drawn by Geoff Campion) [Remarkably faithful to the look of the film. However, apparently for reasons of space, both Marcus' friend Nerva and Petronius' slavegirl Eunice are excised.]

== See also ==
- Epic film
- List of films set in ancient Rome
- List of historical drama films
