= Tarawa (disambiguation) =

Tarawa is an atoll in the Republic of Kiribati.

Tarawa may also refer to:

In military:

- Battle of Tarawa, fought on the Tarawa atoll in World War II
- Tarawa class amphibious assault ship, a class of ships in the US Navy
- USS Tarawa (CV-40), a United States Navy Essex-class aircraft carrier built in 1944
- USS Tarawa (LHA-1), a United States Navy amphibious assault ship built in 1971
- Naval Base Tarawa US Navy 1943-1945

In geography:

- Pacific/Tarawa, a time zone UTC+12
- Tarawa, North Carolina, United States
- Tarawa (Nigeria), Nigeria
- Taroa, also known as Tarawa, an island in the Marshall Islands

Other:

- Tarawa, an Earth Alliance aircraft carrier from the Mobile Suit Gundam SEED Television series
- Tarawa, a piece from the soundtrack of Snow Falling on Cedars by James Newton Howard
- Tarawa (web framework), a web application framework in Python
- Tarawa, Hittite midwife goddesses
- Lilia Tarawa, former member of Gloriavale Christian Community, author, speaker, entrepreneur

== See also ==
- South Tarawa, capital of Kiribati
- Tebua Tarawa, Makin Islands, Kiribati
