= List of 2022 box office number-one films in New Zealand =

This is a list of films which placed number one at the box office in New Zealand during 2022.

== Number-one films ==
†	This implies the highest-grossing movie of the year.

#	Weekend end date	Film	Weekend gross	Top 10 openings
1	9 January 2022	Spider-Man: No Way Home	NZ$751,144	The King's Man (#2), The Addams Family 2: Road Trip (#8)
2	16 January 2022	Spider-Man: No Way Home	NZ$466,065	Scream (#5), King Richard (#7)
3	23 January 2022	Spider-Man: No Way Home	NZ$325,019	Spencer (#6)
4	30 January 2022	Spider-Man: No Way Home	NZ$200,899	Hridayam (#7)
5	6 February 2022	Belfast	NZ$367,255	Jackass Forever (#2), Moonfall (#4)
6	13 February 2022	Death on the Nile	NZ$372,909	Marry Me (#4), Blacklight (#6)
7	20 February 2022	Uncharted	NZ$632,720	Aaraattu (#9), The Worst Person in the World (#10)
8	27 February 2022	Uncharted	NZ$357,421	Gangubai Kathiawadi (#4), Studio 666 (#5), Aaja Mexico Challiye (#6), Bheemla Nayak (#9), Valimai (#10)
9	6 March 2022	The Batman	NZ$1,044,684	Monster Family 2: Nobody's Perfect (#5)
10	13 March 2022	The Batman	NZ$826,715	Off the Rails (#3), Radhe Shyam (#4), The Desperate Hour (#7)
11	20 March 2022	The Batman	NZ$599,429	Gekijouban Jujutsu 0 (#2), Dog (#3), Bachchan Pandey (#5)
12	27 March 2022	The Batman	NZ$409,618	RRR (#2), The Bad Guys (#10)
13	3 April 2022	Sonic the Hedgehog 2	NZ$477,585	Morbius (#2), The Duke (#4)
14	10 April 2022	Fantastic Beasts: The Secrets of Dumbledore	NZ$807,635	Ambulance (#6), X (#10)
15	17 April 2022	Fantastic Beasts: The Secrets of Dumbledore	NZ$487,856	The Lost City (#2), K.G.F: Chapter 2 (#3), Everything Everywhere all at Once (#6) The Last Bus (#10)
16	24 April 2022	Sonic the Hedgehog 2	NZ$603,946	The Unbearable Weight of Massive Talent (#5)
17	1 May 2022	Sonic the Hedgehog 2	NZ$504,025	Downton Abbey: A New Era (#2)
18	8 May 2022	Doctor Strange in the Multiverse of Madness	NZ$2,437,200	Maa (#8)
19	15 May 2022	Doctor Strange in the Multiverse of Madness	NZ$1,101,175	Operation Mincemeat (#3), Saunkan Saunkne (#7)
20	22 May 2022	Doctor Strange in the Multiverse of Madness	NZ$608,187	The Northman (#3), Bhool Bhulaiyaa 2 (#5), To Olivia (#10)
21	29 May 2022	Top Gun: Maverick	NZ$1,969,467	How to Please a Woman (#6), The Bob's Burgers Movie (#8)
22	5 June 2022	Top Gun: Maverick	NZ$2,355,708	Vikram (#4), Samrat Prithviraj (#9), Mothering Sunday (#10)
23	12 June 2022	Jurassic World: Dominion	NZ$1,681,885	Pil's Adventures (#10)
24	19 June 2022	Top Gun: Maverick	NZ$1,095,888	Lightyear (#3), Nude Tuesday (#4)
25	26 June 2022	Elvis	NZ$1,043,403	Whina (#5), The Lion King Reo Māori (#6), Jugjugg Jeeyo (#7)
26	3 July 2022	Minions: The Rise of Gru	NZ$838,558	
27	10 July 2022	Thor: Love and Thunder	NZ$2,530,560	Benediction (#10)
28	17 July 2022	Thor: Love and Thunder	NZ$1,468,415	The Phantom of the Open (#8), Princess Mononoke (#9), The Roundup (#10)
29	24 July 2022	Minions: The Rise of Gru	NZ$931,357	Where the Crawdads Sing (#3), The Black Phone (#6)
30	31 July 2022	Thor: Love and Thunder	NZ$409,282	Chhalla Mud Ke Nahi Aaya (#6), Ek Villain Returns (#9)
31	7 August 2022	Bullet Train	NZ$404,262	
32	14 August 2022	Nope	NZ$243,278	Laal Singh Chaddha (#3), Rakshan Bandhan (#9)
33	21 August 2022	Bullet Train	NZ$211,513	Good Luck to You, Leo Grande (#2), Dragon Ball Super: Super Hero (#4), Gloriavale (#10)
34	28 August 2022	Andre Rieu's 2022 Maastricht Concert: Happy Days Are Here Again	NZ$246,818	Beast (#4)
35	4 September 2022	Muru	NZ$233,710	Orphan: First Kill (#5), Three Thousand Years of Longing (#6), Lancaster (#8)
36	11 September 2022	Brahmāstra: Part One – Shiva	NZ$203,833	After Ever Happy (#6)
37	18 September 2022	Ticket to Paradise	NZ$379,713	Moonage Daydream (#3), See How They Run (#4)
38	25 September 2022	Ticket to Paradise	NZ$309,265	DC League of Super-Pets (#2), Avatar (re-release) (#3), Jeepers Creepers: Reborn (#10)
39	2 October 2022	DC League of Super-Pets	NZ$307,118	Smile (#3), Ponniyin Selvan: Part One (#4), Vikram Vedha (#7), Paws of Fury: The Legend of Hank (#9)
40	9 October 2022	DC League of Super-Pets	NZ$438,553	Don't Worry Darling (#2), Lyle, Lyle, Crocodile (#3), Amsterdam (#5)
41	16 October 2022	DC League of Super-Pets	NZ$408,021	Halloween Ends (#5), Mia and Me: The Hero of Centopia (#10)
42	23 October 2022	Black Adam	NZ$1,212,400	Mrs. Harris Goes to Paris (#2), Dame Valerie Adams: More than Gold (#5)
43	30 October 2022	Black Adam	NZ$685,296	The Woman King (#3), Frozen: Reo Maori (#4), Barbarian (#6), Thank God (#8)
44	6 November 2022	Black Adam	NZ$345,024	One Piece Film: Red (#3)
45	13 November 2022	Black Panther: Wakanda Forever	NZ$1,789,562	Mister Organ (#4), Uunchai (#8)
46	20 November 2022	Black Panther: Wakanda Forever	NZ$1,158,540	Drishyam 2 (#4), She Said (#6), Emily (#7), The Royal Edinburgh Military Tattoo 2022 (#8)
47	27 November 2022	Black Panther: Wakanda Forever	NZ$609,733	The Menu (#2), Strange World (#3), Bhediya (#7)
48	4 December 2022	Black Panther: Wakanda Forever	NZ$347,391	The Road Dance (#8)
49	11 December 2022	Black Panther: Wakanda Forever	NZ$303,772	
50	18 December 2022	Avatar: The Way of Water †	NZ$3,355,135	
51	25 December 2022	Avatar: The Way of Water †	NZ$1,365,571	Cirkus (#3)
52	1 January 2023	Avatar: The Way of Water †	NZ$1,776,285	Puss in Boots: The Last Wish (#2), The Banshees of Inisherin (#3), Whitney Houston: I Wanna Dance with Somebody (#4), The Lost King (#5), A Man Called Otto (#7)

== Highest-grossing films ==
Highest-grossing films of 2022
Rank	Title	Distributor	Domestic gross (NZ$)
1	Avatar: The Way of Water	Disney	NZ$19,939,618
2	Top Gun: Maverick	Paramount Pictures	NZ$14,228,242
3	Thor: Love and Thunder	Disney	NZ$8,258,571
4	Minions: The Rise of Gru	Universal	NZ$7,100,891
5	Doctor Strange in the Multiverse of Madness	Disney	NZ$6,300,007
6	Black Panther: Wakanda Forever	Disney	NZ$6,144,293
7	Elvis	Warner Bros	NZ$4,881,881
8	Puss in Boots: The Last Wish	Universal	NZ$4,633,348
9	The Batman	Warner Bros	NZ$4,476,387
10	Jurassic World Dominion	Universal	NZ$4,474,288

Highest-grossing New Zealand films of 2022
Rank	Title	Distributor	Domestic gross
1	Muru	Rialto	NZ$1,519,022
2	Whina	Transmission	NZ$1,332,558
3	Mister Organ	Madman	NZ$415,571
4	The Lion King Reo Māori	Walt Disney	NZ$367,929
5	Dame Valerie Adams: More than Gold	Eight the Story	NZ$254,284

== Records ==
5 biggest openings
Rank	Title	Distributor	Opening weekend
1	Avatar: The Way of Water	Disney	NZ$3,355,135
2	Thor: Love and Thunder	Disney	NZ$2,530,560
3	Doctor Strange in the Multiverse of Madness	Disney	NZ$2,437,200
4	Top Gun: Maverick	Paramount Pictures	NZ$1,969,467
5	Black Panther: Wakanda Forever	Disney	NZ$1,789,562

5 best second weekend holds for movies playing in more than 70 theatres
Rank	Title	2nd week hold
1	House of Gucci	78%
2	Ghostbusters: Afterlife	46%
3	Clifford the Big Red Dog	27%
4	Top Gun: Maverick	20%
5	The Lost City	13%

Worst second weekend hold for movie playing in more than 70 theatres
Rank	Title	2nd week hold
1	Morbius	-66%
1	The Northman	-66%

Best per theater opening
Rank	Title	Per theater gross
1	Avatar: The Way of Water	$27,278

== See also ==
- List of New Zealand films – New Zealand films by year
- 2022 in film

Preceded by 2021	2022	Succeeded by 2023
