= Gloriavale (film) =

2022 New Zealand documentary film

- Directed by: Fergus Grady; Noel Smyth
- Written by: Noel Smyth
- Produced by: Fergus Grady; Noel Smyth
- Cinematography: Gareth Moon; Noel Smyth
- Edited by: Noel Smyth; Ramon Watkins
- Production companies: Gloriavale Film Pty, Grade A Films
- Distributed by: Limelight Distribution
- Release dates: 6 August 2022 (New Zealand International Film Festival); 17 August 2022 (New Zealand)
- Running time: 89 minutes
- Countries: New Zealand, Australia
- Language: English

Gloriavale is a 2022 New Zealand documentary film, focusing on the Gloriavale Christian Community of the West Coast Region.

== Synopsis ==
The film documents and examines the Gloriavale Christian Community and the widespread abuse experienced there by many current and former members. The filmmakers follow the story of the Ready family, who were excommunicated from Gloriavale, and begin mounting a legal case against the leaders of the community.

== Production ==
The film was directed by Fergus Grady and Noel Smyth, who had previously worked together on the 2019 documentary film Camino Skies. It makes use of archival footage and home videos taken by members of the community.

Gloriavale received funding from Screen Australia in 2021. The film was selected as to be highlighted by Docs-in-Progress at the Cannes Film Festival.

== Release ==
The film debuted on 6 August 2022 at the Isaac Theatre Royal in Christchurch as a part of the New Zealand International Film Festival, and was the closing film of the festival in Auckland on 7 August. It received a release in New Zealand cinemas on 17 August. As of September 2022, it is the fifth highest grossing film of New Zealand origin at the New Zealand box office for 2022.
