= Dame Valerie Adams: More than Gold =

2022 New Zealand documentary film

- Directed by: Briar March
- Produced by: Leanne Pooley
- Starring: Valerie Adams
- Cinematography: Mark Lapwood
- Edited by: Margot Francis; Dion Schmidt
- Production company: Eight the Story Department
- Distributed by: Transmission Films
- Release date: 12 October 2022
- Running time: 90 minutes
- Country: New Zealand
- Language: English

Dame Valerie Adams: More than Gold is a 2022 New Zealand documentary film, focusing on the life of Tongan-New Zealand Olympic shot putter Valerie Adams.

== Synopsis ==
The film follow's Adams' life through her upbringing in Tonga and South Auckland and her professional sporting career, and follows Adams as she prepared for her fifth Olympic games appearance at the 2020 Summer Olympics. The film also addresses issues Adams faced in her life and sporting career, including childhood bullying, losing her mother at 15, racism, in vitro fertilisation, and recovery from surgery.

== Production ==
The film was directed by Briar March, and was produced by Leanne Pooley. The film is a mix of archival footage, interviews and animation, including interview footage with Adams' younger brother Steven Adams and her former coach Kirsten Hellier.

== Release ==
The film debuted on 12 October 2022 at SkyCity Auckland, and received a wide release in New Zealand cinemas on 20 October. As of November 2022, it is the fourth highest grossing film of New Zealand origin at the New Zealand box office for 2022.
