= List of 2019 box office number-one films in New Zealand =

This is a list of films which placed number one at the box office in New Zealand during 2019.

== Number-one films ==
†	This implies the highest-grossing movie of the year.

#	Weekend end date	Film	Weekend gross	Top 10 openings
1	6 January 2019	Aquaman	US$614,692	How to Train Your Dragon: The Hidden World (#2), Mary Poppins Returns (#3), Spider-Man: Into the Spider-Verse (#4)
2	13 January 2019	Aquaman	US$411,013	Instant Family (#6)
3	20 January 2019	Glass	US$298,451	Mary Queen of Scots (#4), Storm Boy (#10)
4	27 January 2019	Dragon Ball Super: Broly	US$205,073	Green Book (#4), The Mule (#9)
5	3 February 2019	Green Book	US$150,298	
6	10 February 2019	Green Book	US$124,947	Cold Pursuit (#2), The Wandering Earth (#3), On the Basis of Sex (#6)
7	17 February 2019	Alita: Battle Angel	US$459,828	What Men Want (#2), Gully Boy (#4), Happy Death Day 2U (#5), Colette (#7)
8	24 February 2019	Alita: Battle Angel	US$300,303	Total Dhamaal (#2), Escape Room (#4), Stan & Ollie (#6)
9	3 March 2019	Alita: Battle Angel	US$161,899	A Dog's Way Home (#5), Luka Chuppi (#7), Greta (#9)
10	10 March 2019	Captain Marvel	US$1,451,444	Badla (#6)
11	17 March 2019	Captain Marvel	US$715,075	Hotel Mumbai (#2)
12	24 March 2019	Captain Marvel	US$436,505	Daffodils (#2), Fighting with My Family (#3), Kesari (#5)
13	31 March 2019	Dumbo	US$331,652	Us (#2), Five Feet Apart (#4), Lucifer (#8), Rabb Da Radio 2 (#10)
14	7 April 2019	Shazam!	US$577,195	Pet Sematary (#6)
15	14 April 2019	Shazam!	US$321,846	The Lego Movie 2: The Second Part (#2), Hellboy (#3), Wonder Park (#9)
16	21 April 2019	Shazam!	US$268,687	Kalank (#4), The Curse of La Llorona (#6), Red Joan (#7)
17	28 April 2019	Avengers: Endgame †	US$4,039,510	
18	5 May 2019	Avengers: Endgame †	US$1,574,826	Long Shot (#2), The Chaperone (#3), The Aftermath (#4), Peppa Pig: Festival of Fun (#6), Verdi: La Traviata (#9), The Chills: The Triumph and Tragedy of Martin Phillipps (#10)
19	12 May 2019	Avengers: Endgame †	US$684,813	The Hustle (#2), Student of the Year 2 (#3), Poms (#4), All Is True (#10)
20	19 May 2019	Pokémon Detective Pikachu	US$599,550	John Wick: Chapter 3 – Parabellum (#2), De De Pyaar De (#5), Top End Wedding (#6)
21	26 May 2019	Aladdin	US$708,641	Brightburn (#6), Muklawa (#8)
22	2 June 2019	Rocketman	US$783,451	Godzilla: King of the Monsters (#2), Asterix: The Secret of the Magic Potion (#10)
23	9 June 2019	Rocketman	US$489,268	Dark Phoenix (#2), Bharat (#4), Tolkien (#8), Laiye Je Yaarian (#10)
24	16 June 2019	Men in Black: International	US$387,877	Sometimes Always Never (#9)
25	23 June 2019	The Secret Life of Pets 2	US$309,253	Child's Play (#6), Shadaa (#8), Anna (#10)
26	30 June 2019	Toy Story 4	US$643,949	Yesterday (#2), Annabelle Comes Home (#3), Parasite (#9)
27	7 July 2019	Spider-Man: Far From Home	US$1,059,903	
28	14 July 2019	Spider-Man: Far From Home	US$791,052	Crawl (#8), Stuber (#9), Camino Skies (#10)
29	21 July 2019	The Lion King	US$3,455,813	Ardaas Karaan (#6)
30	28 July 2019	The Lion King	US$1,310,712	André Rieu's 2019 Maastricht Concert - Shall We Dance? (#2), Chal Mera Putt (#6), Booksmart (#8), The Keeper (#10)
31	4 August 2019	Hobbs & Shaw	US$1,052,105	
32	11 August 2019	Hobbs & Shaw	US$545,784	Late Night (#3), Palm Beach (#4), Bring the Soul: The Movie (#8), Hello, Love, Goodbye (#9)
33	18 August 2019	Once Upon a Time in Hollywood	US$527,178	Mission Mangal (#4), A Dog's Journey (#5), Batla House (#9)
34	25 August 2019	Once Upon a Time in Hollywood	US$353,845	Angel Has Fallen (#2), Weathering with You (#5), Blinded by the Light (#6), Overcomer (#7)
35	1 September 2019	Once Upon a Time in Hollywood	US$198,008	Ne Zha (#2), Dan Carter: A Perfect 10 (#5), Saaho (#6), Apollo 11 (#9), The Kitchen (#10)
36	8 September 2019	It Chapter Two	US$580,849	Take Home Pay (#3), Amazing Grace (#10)
37	15 September 2019	It Chapter Two	US$280,140	The Angry Birds Movie 2 (#2), Dream Girl (#5)
38	22 September 2019	Ad Astra	US$162,018	Rambo: Last Blood (#3), Abominable (#4), Good Boys (#5), Nikka Zaildar 3 (#10)
39	29 September 2019	Ad Astra	US$142,050	Dora and the Lost City of Gold (#3), Scary Stories to Tell in the Dark (#7)
40	6 October 2019	Abominable	US$233,186	War (#5), My People, My Country (#7), The Captain (#10)
41	13 October 2019	Abominable	US$267,364	Gemini Man (#2), Hustlers (#4), Mosley (#9)
42	20 October 2019	Maleficent: Mistress of Evil	US$263,388	Zombieland: Double Tap (#2), Judy (#4), Paw Patrol: Ready, Race, Rescue! (#7)
43	27 October 2019	Joker	US$179,359	Ride Like a Girl (#3), Housefull 4 (#5)
44	3 November 2019	Terminator: Dark Fate	US$271,163	Hillary: Ocean to Sky (#10)
45	10 November 2019	Jojo Rabbit	US$376,886	Last Christmas (#2), Doctor Sleep (#6), Bellbird (#8), Bala (#10)
46	17 November 2019	Jojo Rabbit	US$285,947	Ford v Ferrari (#2), Charlie's Angels (#3)
47	24 November 2019	Jojo Rabbit	US$172,059	Fisherman's Friends (#5), Pagalpanti (#6), Ready or Not (#7)
48	1 December 2019	Frozen 2	US$1,013,134	Knives Out (#2)
49	8 December 2019	Frozen 2	US$616,774	The Addams Family (#3), The Good Liar (#4), Pati Patni Aur Woh (#9)
50	15 December 2019	Frozen 2	US$381,643	Mardaani 2 (#10)
51	22 December 2019	Star Wars: The Rise of Skywalker	US$1,897,526	Dabangg 3 (#3), Only Cloud Knows (#6), Ip Man 4: The Finale (#8)
52	29 December 2019	Jumanji: The Next Level	US$1,007,639	Cats (#4), Good Newwz (#5)

== Highest-grossing films ==
Highest-grossing films of 2019
Rank	Title	Distributor	Domestic gross
1	Avengers: Endgame	Disney	US$8,115,403
2	The Lion King	Disney	US$7,766,151
3	Captain Marvel	Disney	US$3,923,583
4	Frozen 2	Disney	US$3,498,784
5	Toy Story 4	Disney	US$3,474,014
6	Spider-Man: Far From Home	Sony Pictures / Columbia	US$3,417,381
7	Star Wars: The Rise of Skywalker	Disney	US$3,213,912
8	Aladdin	Disney	US$3,134,058
9	Rocketman	Paramount	US$2,924,516
10	Aquaman	Warner Bros.	US$2,885,400

Highest-grossing New Zealand films of 2019
Rank	Title	Distributor	Domestic gross
1	Jojo Rabbit	Fox Searchlight, Defender, Piki	$1,739,186
2	Daffodils	Libertine	$712,185
3	Take Home Pay	Cadness Street	$440,810
4	Bellbird	Herringbone, Stella Maris, Blueskin	$279,092
5	Vai	Brown Sugar Apple Grunt, Department of Post	$88,402

== See also ==
- List of New Zealand films – New Zealand films by year
- 2019 in film

2019	Succeeded by 2020
