= List of 2021 box office number-one films in New Zealand =

This is a list of films which placed number one at the box office in New Zealand during 2021.

== Number-one films ==
†	This implies the highest-grossing movie of the year.

#	Weekend end date	Film	Weekend gross	Top 10 openings
1	3 January 2021	Wonder Woman 1984	NZ$653,823	The Dry (#3), Monster Hunter (#4), Dragon Rider (#6)
2	10 January 2021	The Croods: A New Age	NZ$404,427	Promising Young Woman (#5)
3	17 January 2021	The Croods: A New Age	NZ$237,031	Master (#6)
4	24 January 2021	The Croods: A New Age	NZ$248,760	Dawn Raid (#4), Penguin Bloom (#6), Wild Mountain Thyme (#8)
5	31 January 2021	The Marksman	NZ$193,480	
6	7 February 2021	The Marksman	NZ$147,974	Shadow in the Cloud (#2)
7	14 February 2021	Detective Chinatown 3	NZ$148,606	A Writer's Odyssey (#4), Love, Weddings & Other Disasters (#5), Ammonite (#8)
8	21 February 2021	The Little Things	NZ$130,868	Wrong Turn (#3), Never Too Late (#6)
9	28 February 2021	Demon Slayer: Kimetsu no Yaiba the Movie: Mugen Train	NZ$342,107	Boss Level (#3), Endgame (#10)
10	7 March 2021	Cousins	NZ$286,916	Raya and the Last Dragon (#2), Chaos Walking (#3), Nomadland (#5)
11	14 March 2021	Cousins	NZ$256,610	Roohi (#6), The Priest (#9), Jathi Ratnalu (#10)
12	21 March 2021	Cousins	NZ$182,987	Crisis (#6), French Exit (#7), Mumbai Saga (#9)
13	28 March 2021	Godzilla vs. Kong	NZ$1,402,326	Hi Mom (#4)
14	4 April 2021	Godzilla vs. Kong	NZ$870,414	Peter Rabbit 2: The Runaway (#2), Nobody (#3), The Father (#4), The Courier (#5)
15	11 April 2021	Godzilla vs. Kong	NZ$394,898	Voyagers (#8), Vakeel Saab (#9), Girls Can't Surf (#10)
16	18 April 2021	Godzilla vs. Kong	NZ$238,985	Tom and Jerry (#5)
17	25 April 2021	Mortal Kombat	NZ$571,045	Six Minutes to Midnight (#5)
18	2 May 2021	Peter Rabbit 2: The Runaway	NZ$433,819	Wrath of Man (#2)
19	9 May 2021	Wrath of Man	NZ$202,946	James & Isey (#3)
20	16 May 2021	Wrath of Man	NZ$147,633	Those Who Wish Me Dead (#2), Spiral (#3), Finding You (#6)
21	23 May 2021	Wrath of Man	NZ$107,465	
22	30 May 2021	A Quiet Place Part II	NZ$621,978	Cruella (#2), Poppy (#10)
23	6 June 2021	The Conjuring: The Devil Made Me Do It	NZ$625,565	Dream Horse (#4), Minamata (#10)
24	13 June 2021	The Conjuring: The Devil Made Me Do It	NZ$306,765	Spirit Untamed (#2)
25	20 June 2021	Fast and Furious 9	NZ$1,957,106	Herself (#7), Antoinette in the Cévennes (#9)
26	27 June 2021	Fast and Furious 9	NZ$900,785	Hitman's Wife's Bodyguard (#2), In the Heights (#3)
27	4 July 2021	Fast and Furious 9	NZ$434,694	Escape Room: Tournament of Champions (#4)
28	11 July 2021	Black Widow	NZ$1,280,633	
29	18 July 2021	Space Jam: A New Legacy	NZ$965,888	Gunpowder Milkshake (#8)
29	25 July 2021	Space Jam: A New Legacy	NZ$673,653	Snake Eyes: G.I. Joe Origins (#3), Old (#4)
30	1 August 2021	Jungle Cruise	NZ$479,100	The Justice of Bunny King (#6), The Mistfits (#9)
31	8 August 2021	The Suicide Squad	NZ$667,737	Tunka Tunka (#5), Queen Bees (#7), How to Be a Good Wife (#10)
32	15 August 2021	Free Guy	NZ$665,018	Puaada (#5), Coming Home in the Dark (#6)
33	22 August 2021	New Zealand cinemas closed due to the COVID-19 lockdown		
34	29 August 2021	New Zealand cinemas closed due to the COVID-19 lockdown		
35	5 September 2021	New Zealand cinemas closed due to the COVID-19 lockdown		
36	12 September 2021	Free Guy	NZ$140,768	André Rieu's 2021 Summer Concert: Together Again (#3)
37	19 September 2021	Shang-Chi and the Legend of the Ten Rings	NZ$514,383	Effiel (#4)
38	26 September 2021	Shang-Chi and the Legend of the Ten Rings	NZ$305,819	The Ice Road (#3), Ride the Eagle (#5), Qismat 2 (#8)
39	3 October 2021	Shang-Chi and the Legend of the Ten Rings	NZ$192,167	The Boss Baby: Family Business (#2), Chal Mera Putt 3 (#6), Moosa Jatt (#9), Anibo: Amazon Princess (#10)
39	10 October 2021	No Time to Die	NZ$987,603	Paw Patrol (#4)
40	17 October 2021	No Time to Die	NZ$681,264	Honsla Rakh (#6), The Alpinist (#8)
41	24 October 2021	No Time to Die	NZ$494,882	The Last Duel (#2), Julia (#9)
42	31 October 2021	No Time to Die	NZ$270,746	Juniper (#2), Halloween Kills (#3), Ron's Gone Wrong (#4), Antlers (#7), NZ Opera: Semele (#9)
43	7 November 2021	Eternals	NZ$464,294	Sooryavanshi (#3), The Many Saints of Newark (#6), Paani Ch Madhaani (#9), Annaatthe (#10)
44	14 November 2021	Eternals	NZ$312,632	Last Night in Soho (#5), My Hero Academia: World Heroes' Mission (#7), Fuffad Ji (#10)
45	21 November 2021	Eternals	NZ$184,523	Falling for Figaro (#4), Bunty Aur Babli 2 (#7), Kurup (#8), Warning (#10)
46	28 November 2021	Venom: Let There Be Carnage	NZ$401,924	A Boy Called Christmas (#4), Satyameva Jayate 2 (#7), Antim: The Final Truth (#9)
47	5 December 2021	Dune	NZ$600,998	Encanto (#5), André Rieu: Christmas with André 2021 (#6), Marakkar: Lion of the Arabian Sea (#8)
48	12 December 2021	Dune	NZ$451,335	The French Dispatch (#6), Chandigarh Kare Aashiqui (#9)
49	19 December 2021	Spider-Man: No Way Home †	NZ$3,336,322	Pushpa: The Rise Part 1 (#9)
50	26 December	Spider-Man: No Way Home †	NZ$1,109,346	The Matrix Resurrections (#2), Sing 2 (#3), 83 (#4), West Side Story (#8)
51	2 January 2022	Spider-Man: No Way Home †	NZ$915,681	Ghostbusters: Afterlife (#4), House of Gucci (#5), Clifford the Big Red Dog (#9)

== Highest-grossing films ==
Highest-grossing films of 2021
Rank	Title	Distributor	Domestic gross
1	Spider-Man: No Way Home	Sony Pictures	NZ$11,880,770
2	No Time to Die	MGM / Universal	NZ$5,713,446
3	Fast and Furious 9	Universal Pictures	NZ$4,808,879
4	Godzilla vs Kong	Warner Bros	NZ$4,665,692
5	Peter Rabbit 2: The Runaway	Sony Pictures	NZ$4,076,424
6	Black Widow	Disney	NZ$3,919,191
7	Space Jam: A New Legacy	Warner Bros	NZ$3,362,266
8	Sing 2	Universal Pictures	NZ$3,054,747
9	A Quiet Place Part II	Paramount Pictures	NZ$2,662,806
10	Dune	Warner Bros	NZ$2,645,599

Highest-grossing New Zealand films of 2021
Rank	Title	Distributor	Domestic gross
1	Cousins	Vendetta Films	NZ$1,114,392
2	James & Isey		NZ$409,667
3	Dawn Raid	General Film Corporation	NZ$230,949
4	Juniper	Sandy Lane Productions	NZ$204,891
5	Shadow in the Cloud	Four Knights, Endeavor, Rhea	NZ$190,297

== Records ==
5 biggest openings
Rank	Title	Distributor	Opening weekend
1	Spider-Man: No Way Home	Sony Pictures	NZ$3,336,322
2	Fast and Furious 9	Universal Pictures	NZ$1,957,106
3	Godzilla vs. Kong	Warner Bros	NZ$1,402,326
4	Black Widow	Disney	NZ$1,280,633
5	No Time to Die	United Pictures	NZ$987,603

5 best second weekend holds for movies playing in more than 80 theatres
Rank	Title	2nd week hold
1	Sing 2	173%
2	The Boss Baby: Family Business	170%
3	Tom and Jerry	120%
4	The Matrix Resurrections	16%
5	Ron's Gone Wrong	8%

Worst second weekend hold for movie playing in more than 80 theatres
Rank	Title	2nd week hold
1	Free Guy (Note: Cinemas shut during Free Guy's 2nd weekend)	-100%

Best per theater opening
Rank	Title	Per theater gross
1	Spider-Man: No Way Home	$30,057

== See also ==
- List of New Zealand films – New Zealand films by year
- 2021 in film

Preceded by 2020	2021	Succeeded by 2022
