= List of 2020 box office number-one films in New Zealand =

This is a list of films which placed number one at the box office in New Zealand during 2020.

== Number-one films ==
The Hobbit: An Unexpected Journey (reissue) became the highest grossing film of 2020 despite never reaching #1.

#	Weekend end date	Film	Weekend gross	Top 10 openings
1	5 January 2020	Jumanji: The Next Level	US$700,287	Little Women (#3), The Gentlemen (#4), Spies in Disguise (#6)
2	12 January 2020	1917	US$452,113	Playing with Fire (#8), A Shaun the Sheep Movie: Farmageddon (#9), Darbar (#10)
3	19 January 2020	1917	US$314,601	Bad Boys for Life (#2), Dolittle (#3), Bombshell (#7)
4	26 January 2020	1917	US$218,540	Street Dancer 3D (#6), A Beautiful Day in the Neighborhood (#7)
5	2 February 2020	1917	US$170,332	Midway (#4), The Grudge (#8)
6	9 February 2020	Birds of Prey	US$299,885	André Rieu: 70 Years Young (#3)
7	16 February 2020	Sonic the Hedgehog	US$332,643	Emma (#3), Love Aaj Kal (#9)
8	23 February 2020	Sonic the Hedgehog	US$280,209	The Call of the Wild (#3), The Legend of Baron To'a (#9), Shubh Mangal Zyada Saavdhan (#10)
9	1 March 2020	The Invisible Man	US$179,746	Les Misérables: The Staged Concert (#8), The Current War (#10)
10	8 March 2020	The Invisible Man	US$152,682	Baaghi 3 (#3), Dark Waters (#6), Fleabag (#7)
11	15 March 2020	Bloodshot	US$130,840	Chal Mera Putt 2 (#4), Military Wives (#5), I Still Believe (#6), My Hero Academia: Heroes Rising (#7)
12	22 March 2020	Bloodshot	US$42,581	
13	29 March 2020	New Zealand cinemas closed and box office reporting suspended due to the COVID-19 pandemic		
14	5 April 2020	New Zealand cinemas closed and box office reporting suspended due to the COVID-19 pandemic		
15	12 April 2020	New Zealand cinemas closed and box office reporting suspended due to the COVID-19 pandemic		
16	19 April 2020	New Zealand cinemas closed and box office reporting suspended due to the COVID-19 pandemic		
17	26 April 2020	New Zealand cinemas closed and box office reporting suspended due to the COVID-19 pandemic		
18	3 May 2020	New Zealand cinemas closed and box office reporting suspended due to the COVID-19 pandemic		
19	10 May 2020	New Zealand cinemas closed and box office reporting suspended due to the COVID-19 pandemic		
20	17 May 2020	New Zealand cinemas closed and box office reporting suspended due to the COVID-19 pandemic		
21	24 May 2020	New Zealand cinemas closed and box office reporting suspended due to the COVID-19 pandemic		
22	31 May 2020	New Zealand cinemas closed and box office reporting suspended due to the COVID-19 pandemic		
23	7 June 2020	New Zealand cinemas closed and box office reporting suspended due to the COVID-19 pandemic		
24	14 June 2020	The Trip to Greece	US$38,234	Love Sarah (#2), The Assistant (#4), Resistance (#6)
25	21 June 2020	Love Sarah	US$77,638	
26	28 June 2020	Love Sarah	US$79,177	Red Shoes and the Seven Dwarfs (#5), The Booksellers (#9)
27	5 July 2020	Trolls World Tour	US$149,060	The High Note (#3), The Burnt Orange Heresy (#5)
28	12 July 2020	Trolls World Tour	US$284,461	A Bump Along the Way (#10)
29	19 July 2020	Trolls World Tour	US$303,314	The Personal History of David Copperfield (#2), The King of Staten Island (#4), Radioactive (#5)
30	26 July 2020	The Personal History of David Copperfield	US$91,054	The Gershwins' Porgy and Bess (#5), No Escape (#6), Shirley (#10)
31	2 August 2020	Unhinged	US$101,146	The Secret: Dare to Dream (#2), Where'd You Go, Bernadette (#5)
32	9 August 2020	This Town	US$127,463	Peninsula (#5)
33	16 August 2020	This Town	US$60,710	23 Walks (#6)
34	23 August 2020	This Town	US$59,448	Lowdown Dirty Criminals (#2)
35	30 August 2020	Tenet	US$249,960	Bill & Ted Face the Music (#6), The Eight Hundred (#9)
36	6 September 2020	Tenet	US$346,594	The New Mutants (#2), Mulan (#7)
37	13 September 2020	Tenet	US$235,389	Break the Silence: The Movie (#4), After We Collided (#6)
38	20 September 2020	Savage	US$201,587	A Night at the Louvre: Leonardo da Vinci (#9)
39	27 September 2020	Savage	US$122,748	The War with Grandpa (#3), Hope Gap (#5), Cats & Dogs 3: Paws Unite! (#6), PAW Patrol: Jet to the Rescue (#7)
40	4 October 2020	The War with Grandpa	US$140,900	Jiang Ziya: Legend of Deification (#6)
41	11 October 2020	Greenland	US$183,565	My People, My Homeland (#9)
42	18 October 2020	Greenland	US$129,557	André Rieu: Magical Maastricht (#2)
43	25 October 2020	Honest Thief	US$117,654	Baby Done (#2)
44	1 November 2020	Honest Thief	US$92,505	The Craft: Legacy (#4), The Empty Man (#6)
45	8 November 2020	The Empty Man	US$11,449	
46	15 November 2020	Rams	US$103,038	Freaky (#3), Laxmii (#4), I Am Woman (#6), Made in Italy (#8)
47	22 November 2020	Rams	US$125,410	Fatman (#8), Suraj Pe Mangal Bhari (#9), Gekijouban Fate/Stay Night: Heaven's Feel: - III. Spring Song (#10)
48	29 November 2020	SIX60: Till the Lights Go Out	US$95,457	Happiest Season (#2), Let Him Go (#6)
49	6 December 2020	SIX60: Till the Lights Go Out	US$60,887	Violet Evergarden: The Movie (#9)
50	13 December 2020	The Witches	US$115,769	Mama's Music Box (#6), Words on Bathroom Walls (#7), The End of the Storm (#9)
51	20 December 2020	The Witches	US$89,324	Superintelligence (#2)
52	27 December 2020	Wonder Woman 1984	US$632,723	The Croods: A New Age (#2), Blithe Spirit (#4), Shock Wave 2 (#7)

== Highest-grossing films ==
Highest-grossing films of 2020
Rank	Title	Distributor	Domestic gross
1	The Hobbit: An Unexpected Journey	Warner Bros.	$7,449,329
2	Finding Dory	Disney	$4,626,743
3	A Star Is Born	Warner Bros.	$4,041,740
4	Jumanji: The Next Level	Sony Pictures / Columbia	$2,591,975
5	1917	Universal	$2,330,268
6	Tenet	Warner Bros.	$2,018,998
7	Little Women	Sony Pictures / Columbia	$1,742,415
8	Trolls World Tour	Universal	$1,592,670
9	Sonic the Hedgehog	Paramount	$1,476,010
10	Bad Boys for Life	Sony Pictures / Columbia	$1,327,861

Highest-grossing New Zealand films of 2020
Rank	Title	Distributor	Domestic gross
1	The Hobbit: An Unexpected Journey	Warner Bros.	$7,449,329
2	Savage	POP, Avalon	$1,099,400
3	Jojo Rabbit	Fox Searchlight, Defender, Piki	$598,008
4	This Town	South Pacific, White Balance	$491,386
5	Baby Done	Piki	$390,248

== See also ==
- List of New Zealand films – New Zealand films by year
- 2020 in film

Preceded by 2019	2020	Succeeded by 2021
