= Lilia Tarawa =

New Zealand author and speaker (born 1990)

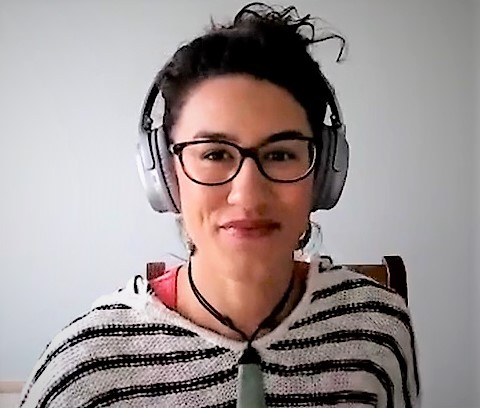
- Tarawa in 2019
- Born: 24 October 1990 (age 35); Gloriavale Christian Community, West Coast, New Zealand
- Years active: 2017–present
- Notable work: Daughter of Gloriavale (book); I grew up in a cult. It was heaven – and hell. (TEDx Talk)
- Website: https://www.liliatarawa.com/

Lilia Tarawa is a New Zealand speaker, author, entrepreneur, and influencer. Tarawa grew up in the Gloriavale Christian Community on New Zealand's West Coast, but left the community with her parents and siblings in 2009. In 2017 Tarawa published her book Daughter of Gloriavale.

== Biography ==
For the first 18 years of her life, Tarawa lived in the Gloriavale Christian Community. Tarawa said she felt "brainwashed" but struggled with the restrictions placed on her by the Gloriavale community.

In her book, Tarawa describes how Neville Cooper, the leader of Gloriavale, believed women were ready for marriage and sex when they began their menstrual cycle. Tarawa says it was only the New Zealand marriage laws which stopped marriages before the age of 16. Tarawa says Cooper "would have happily married off children of 10 or 12 years" if the law allowed it. At 18 years old, two incidents altered her perspective on Gloriavale. These included witnessing a young boy being violently punished with a leather belt. Another was her best friend being told she had to marry an Indian boy she had never met because Gloriavale planned to open a chapter in India.

In 2009, Tarawa and her family, including her father, her mother, and her six younger siblings left Gloriavale with all their possessions. They joined Tarawa's three other siblings, who had escaped Gloriavale as teenagers. Tarawa believed for years that leaving Gloriavale meant she would go to hell.

=== After escaping Gloriavale ===
In 2017, eight years after leaving Gloriavale, Tarawa's six younger siblings still lived at home with their parents in Canterbury. Her siblings were involved in kapa haka and basketball. Tarawa planned on learning about her whakapapa. Tarawa says she was discouraged from identifying as Māori but she has since changed her views. Tarawa noted that her taua, as well as reconnecting with her grandmother and a few of her Māori family outside of Gloriavale, has allowed her to explore more of her Māori heritage. She said "I'd like to learn more about our culture in general. Like, what are we passionate about? And what iwi are out there, because I know that I'm Ngāi Tahu, but I don't know a lot about other iwi." Tarawa now speaks out about female repression within the church.

Tarawa said she heard that "everything got stricter" after her family left Gloriavale. She noted that it was uncommon "for a whole family to leave together", whereas typically the community may see "one or two people running away in the middle of the night, backpack on their shoulders."

In 2017, Tarawa published the autobiography Daughter of Gloriavale: My Life in a Religious Cult about her experiences in Gloriavale. Daughter of Gloriavale was one of the most popular eBooks borrowed from the Christchurch City Libraries during the COVID-19 lockdown.

== Personal life ==
Tarawa lives in Christchurch. She is the granddaughter of the Australian-born founder of Gloriavale, Hopeful Christian (formerly known as Neville Cooper), and has 9 siblings. She is part of the Māori tribe Ngāi Tahu.

== Work ==
- Tarawa, Lilia (2017). Daughter of Gloriavale : My life in a Religious Cult. Sydney: Allen & Unwin. ISBN 978-1-76063-918-1. OCLC 1002697888.
- Tarawa, Lilia (16 November 2017). "I grew up in a cult. It was heaven -- and hell" (YouTube Video). TEDxTalks (Christchurch).

== See also ==
- Gloriavale Christian Community
