= Gloriavale Christian Community =

Christian commune in Haupiri, South Island, New Zealand

Coordinates: 42°36′13″S 171°42′1.7″E

- Classification: Christian
- Orientation: Fundamentalist
- Scripture: King James Bible
- Overseeing Shepherd: Stephen Standfast
- Region: South Island, New Zealand
- Language: English
- Founder: Neville Cooper
- Origin: 1969 (57 years ago); Canterbury, New Zealand
- Number of followers: est. 468 (2023 census)
- Primary schools: 1
- Secondary schools: 1
- Official website: gloriavale.org.nz

The Gloriavale Christian Community is a small and isolated community located at Haupiri on the West Coast of the South Island in New Zealand. It had a recorded population of roughly 468 as of the 2023 census. It has operated on a property owned by the registered charitable Christian Church Community Trust since 1991.

Gloriavale was founded in 1969 by travelling evangelist Neville Cooper ("Hopeful Christian"). Originating as the Springbank Christian Community, the group established a settlement called Gloriavale in the South Island's West Coast Region during the 1990s. Gloriavale Christian Community became self-sufficient with its own school and various agricultural, tourism, and transportation businesses including a short-lived airline called Air West Coast.

Cooper served as leader (known as "Overseeing Shepherd"). Following his 1995 conviction on three counts of indecent assault and subsequent prison sentence, he remained as leader until his death in 2018. He was succeeded by Howard Temple, who served as leader until August 2025, when he resigned after pleading guilty to 12 charges of indecently assaulting young women and girls. The current leader of Gloriavale is Stephen Standfast.

Gloriavale Christian Community is known for its fundamentalist Christian beliefs and practices. Key beliefs and practices have included an emphasis on large families and female submission to male headship. Members (also known as the Cooperites) wear distinctive uniforms, with males wearing long-sleeve blue shirts and trousers, and females wearing long blue dresses and scarves. Gloriavale has also controversially shunned members who have left the community over disagreements with the leadership.

During the early 21st century, Gloriavale attracted significant media coverage and public interest in New Zealand following various allegations and incidents of sexual assault, physical assault, and workplace exploitation. Two separate Employment Court rulings in May 2022 and July 2023 found that its members including women and girls were employees who were subjected to prolonged labour exploitation and servitude. In May 2022, Gloriavale's leadership apologised for various acts of abuse and labour exploitation that had occurred within the community. Several Gloriavale leavers including Lilia Tarawa and Gloriavale Leavers' Support Trust have sought to raise awareness of abuses in Gloriavale and help former residents integrate into New Zealand society.

== History ==
=== Origins ===
The group was founded in 1969 by Neville Cooper (aka "Hopeful Christian"), an Australian-born preacher who was invited to New Zealand, having earlier (as a member of the Voice of Deliverance Evangelist Mission) survived a near fatal 1965 plane crash in south-east Queensland.

Following a period as a travelling evangelist in New Zealand, Cooper returned to Australia and brought his wife and children to New Zealand. Following 18 months of travelling the country, the Coopers settled in Rangiora near Christchurch, where Cooper helped found the local New Life Church. Following a breakdown in the relationship with the local New Life pastor, Cooper established his own church called "The Christian Church" at Springbank near Christchurch, bringing half of the Rangiora New Life congregation with him. They became known as the Springbank Christian Community.

The Springbank Christian Community acquired a farm in Cust from the Harrison family, two of whose sons married two of Cooper's daughters. The Springbank Community built a school, church complex, and established several plumbing, drainlaying, gasfitting, aircraft engineering, motor mechanics, waterbed manufacturing, and cabinetry businesses at the Cust farm. In addition, the Church also raised pigs, sheep and grew crops. While at Cust, the Springbank Christian Community established a point system for members to share wages and profits from the church businesses. Since the church provided food and basic needs, members shut down their personal accounts and came to depend on church distributions to live. In addition, Cooper instituted modest blue uniforms for members including long dresses for women.

=== Relocation to Haupiri Valley ===
After the Springbank Christian Community outgrew its Cust site, they relocated to a larger property on the West Coast Region of the South Island between 1991 and 1995. This new settlement, located in the Haupiri Valley was named "Gloriavale" after the wife of Neville Cooper, and established the existing Gloriavale Christian Community, roughly 60 kilometres (37 miles) inland from Greymouth.

Cooper and his followers purchased two large dairy farms in Haupiri Valley and across the Haupiri river called Glenhopeful. From 1999, more infrastructure including a church called "Gloriavale," four large hostels, sheds, and a main centre were gradually built. The main centre housed a commercial kitchen, mess hall, school rooms, preschool, office spaces, commercial laundry, boiler room, and several living spaces. This main centre was also used for communal gatherings and feasts.

In addition to the two dairy farms, Gloriavale established several enterprises including a sphagnum-moss export business called "Discoveries in Gardening," a deer farm, pet food manufacturing plant, a helicopter-servicing business, and a hunting lodge venture called "Wilderness Quest NZ." Work in Gloriavale was organised along gender lines with women being limited to mainly hospitality and child-raising roles.

The community runs Gloriavale Christian School, a private coeducational composite (years 1–13) school with a roll of 200. The school moved to the West Coast in 1990.

On 10 August 2025, Gloriavale's Overseeing Shepherd Howard Temple resigned after pleading guilty to 12 charges of sexual offending against women and girls in late July 2025. Stephen Standfast was designated as his successor.

On 14 August 2026, a boiler shed at Gloriavale's Value Protein pet food plant was destroyed during a fire.

On 22 September 2026, the Charities Registration Board stripped Gloriavale's Christian Church Community Trust of its charitable status for "serious wrongdoing" including the use of child labour, unsafe and dangerous working conditions and the failure of Gloriavale's school to report sexual offending against children.

=== Air West Coast ===
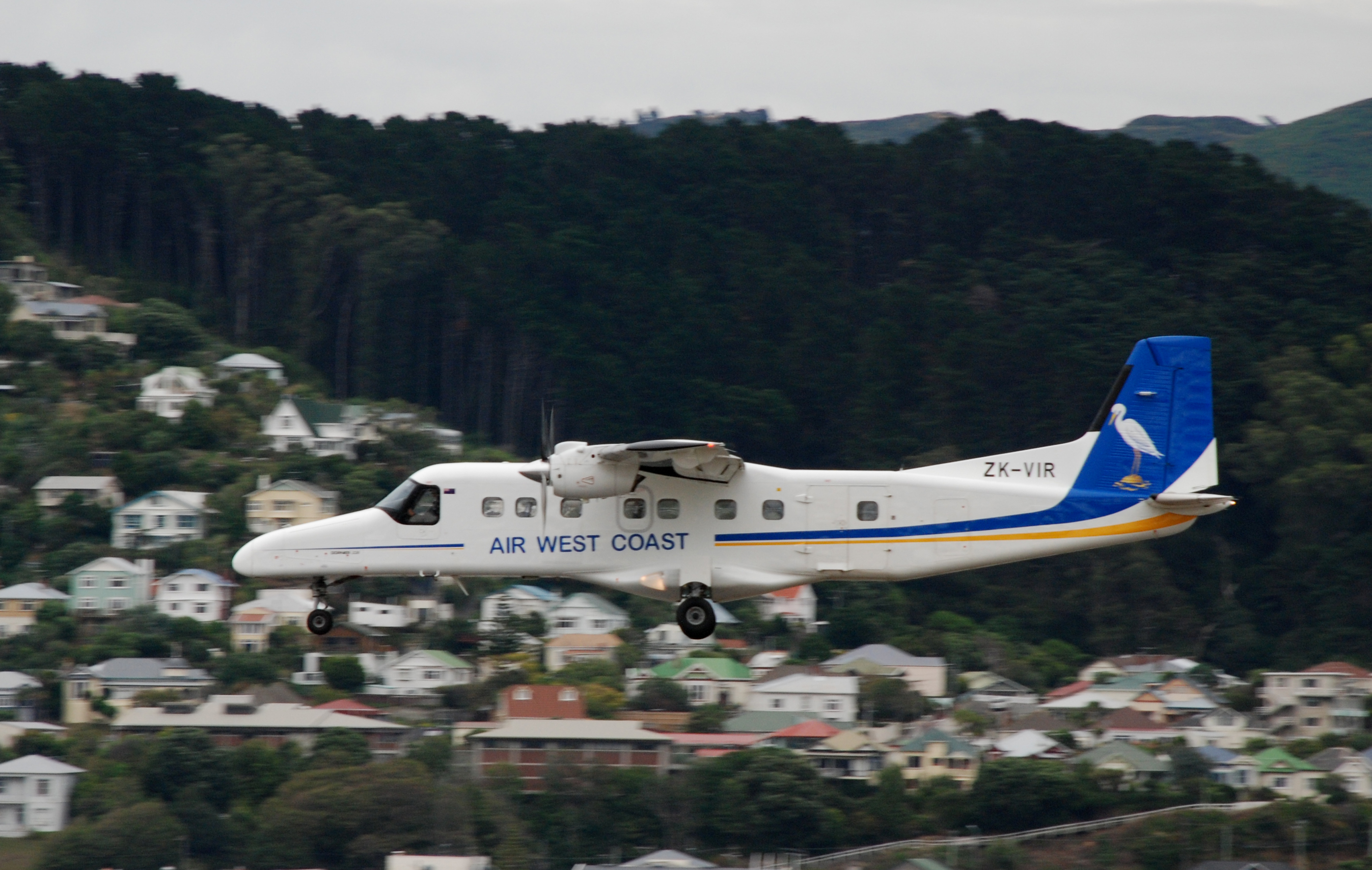
Air West Coast Dornier 228 on approach to Wellington in March 2007

Gloriavale owned Air West Coast Ltd in 2021.

Air West Coast's Christchurch service ended due to a lack of passengers in April 2003. Air West Coast reviewed its service and dropped Westport stopover from the Greymouth to Wellington flight on 27 June 2008.

== Demographics ==
Statistics New Zealand describes Gloriavale as a rural settlement, covering 3.56 km^{2} (1.37 sq mi). It had an estimated population of 480 as of June 2025, with a population density of 135 people per km^{2}. The 2023 census showed a population of 468 people, with 101 babies having been born in the community between 2018 and 2023. The census also reported that Gloriavale had the youngest population and the highest birth rate in the country, as well as the lowest median income, with the average personal income being $19,500 a year.

Gloriavale is part of the larger Lake Brunner statistical area.

Historical population
| Year | Pop. | ±% p.a. |
|---|---|---|
| 2006 | 360 | — |
| 2013 | 495 | +4.65% |
| 2018 | 609 | +4.23% |
| 2023 | 468 | −5.13% |
The 2006 population is for a larger area of 20.73 km^{2}. Source:

Gloriavale had a population of 468 in the 2023 New Zealand census, a decrease of 141 people (−23.2%) since the 2018 census, and a decrease of 27 people (−5.5%) since the 2013 census. There were 231 males and 237 females in 0 dwellings. The median age was 12.0 years (compared with 38.1 years nationally). There were 279 people (59.6%) aged under 15 years, 90 (19.2%) aged 15 to 29, 81 (17.3%) aged 30 to 64, and 18 (3.8%) aged 65 or older.

People could identify as more than one ethnicity. The results were 99.4% European (Pākehā), 1.3% Māori, and 1.3% other, which includes people giving their ethnicity as "New Zealander". English was spoken by 92.3%, Māori by 0.6%, and other languages by 1.3%. No language could be spoken by 7.1% (e.g. too young to talk). The percentage of people born overseas was 3.8, compared with 28.8% nationally.

Religious affiliations were 83.3% Christian, 0.6% Jewish, and 0.6% other religions. People who answered that they had no religion were 10.9%, and 4.5% of people did not answer the census question.

Of those at least 15 years old, 24 (12.7%) people had a bachelor's or higher degree, 138 (73.0%) had a post-high school certificate or diploma, and 24 (12.7%) people exclusively held high school qualifications. The median income was $19,500, compared with $41,500 nationally. The employment status of those at least 15 was 87 (46.0%) full-time and 24 (12.7%) part-time.

== Culture and beliefs ==
Known by some outsiders as the "Cooperites" after their leader Neville Cooper, the group rejects this name and members refer to themselves only as Christians. Members of the community live a fundamentalist Christian life in accordance with their interpretation of the teachings of the New Testament. The community attempts to uphold the example of the first Christian church in Jerusalem (Acts 2:41–47) for its principles of sharing and holding all things in common.

The group teaches that the only true way to salvation is through faith in Jesus Christ and obedience to the commands of God.

According to Stuff, several key beliefs and practices at Gloriavale include creationism, a ban of contraception and divorce, an emphasis on large families, and female submission to male headship. In addition, members of the community do not celebrate birthdays, anniversaries and holidays such as Christmas and Easter. Children are also not immunised. Men and boys are expected to keep their hair short and wear a light blue shirt and dark blue pants, while women wear long blue dresses and cover their heads with scarves. Outsiders wanting to join Gloriavale undergo an initiation process known as "submitting," which involves abandoning their careers, opinions, possessions, outside contact, and free will.

Work at Gloriavale is organised along gender lines. Work opportunities for most women in the community are limited to domestic work including food preparation and cleaning. Male members work in Gloriavale's businesses and construction work. According to Tarawa, founder Neville Cooper discouraged female members of Gloriavale from developing leadership qualities due to his belief that women were mandated by God to submit to male leadership; citing his dismissive response to her school report card.

Those who leave the community are sometimes shunned and denied contact with family members who have not left Gloriavale; because most residents in Gloriavale are born into the community, this can often comprise a person's entire family.

On 29 March 2020, it was reported that members of the Gloriavale community were failing to comply with lockdown procedures amidst the ongoing COVID-19 pandemic in New Zealand, with reports that childcare at community-run daycare centres, lessons at community-run schools, and meetings were all continuing despite social distancing measures. Police within the area later confirmed that they were working with Gloriavale in order to ensure that members of its community abided by lockdown restrictions.

== Sexual and physical abuse ==
=== Neville Cooper ===
In 1994, founder Neville Cooper was convicted of 11 charges of indecent assault and sentenced to six years imprisonment. The New Zealand Court of Appeal quashed these convictions and ordered a new trial. In 1995, he was convicted on three counts of sexual abuse against young members of Gloriavale at his second trial based on the testimonies of his son and several young women who had fled the compound. Though Cooper was sentenced to five years imprisonment, he was released on bail after serving eleven months. Despite his conviction for sexual offending, Gloriavale's leaders withheld this information from the community and claimed that outsiders were persecuting Gloriavale and had spread lies about him. During his imprisonment, Cooper continued leading Gloriavale and regularly sent letters and consulted with the leadership. Cooper later changed his name to Hopeful Christian. Cooper died of cancer on 15 May 2018, aged 92.

=== Howard Temple ===
Howard Temple was the leader of Gloriavale, holding the title of Overseeing Shepherd, from 2018 until his resignation in August 2025. Temple was charged in July and August 2023 with sexual offending against 10 girls between 1997 and 2022. The female complainants ranged in age from 9 to 20 at the time of the alleged offending. In late July 2025, Temple underwent trial on 24 charges of historic sexual offending against girls and women at the Greymouth District Court. Following two days of proceedings, he pleaded guilty to 12 charges including indecent assault, indecency and common assault. In August 2025, Howard Temple resigned as the church leader and was replaced by Stephen Standfast.

On 12 December 2025, Howard Temple was sentenced to 26 months in prison for the offences spanning 20 years and added to the child sex offender registry. The judge described the offences as excruciating for the victims. The 10 victims wrote in their victim impact statements how Temple had impacted their lives, describing issues such as panic attacks, anxiety, insomnia, and nightmares. One victim stated because of the sexual offending she feels very unsafe around men, impacting her ability to work. The judge gave Temple a 13% discount on his starting sentence of 3 years. The same day as he was given his sentence, Temple appealed against the sentence and was subsequently released on bail. Several Gloriavale members were in court to support Temple during his sentencing. In early March 2026, Christchurch High Court Justice Owen Paulson replaced Temple's prison sentence with a period of home detention.

=== Jonathan Benjamin ===
In November 2023, former Gloriavale man Jonathan Benjamin was tried on 20 charges including four counts of rape during his time in Gloriavale between 1986 and 2017. On 11 December, Benjamin was convicted of 11 charges of sexual offending against four people during his time at Gloriavale. In mid March 2024, Benjamin was sentenced at the Greymouth District Court to 11 years and 10 months for 26 charges of sexual offending against children. Several victims including Virginia Courage read victim impact statements.

=== Tim Disciple ===
In early November 2022, Gloriavale member and dairy worker Tim Disciple had his prison sentence for indecent assault reduced. Disciple had been sentenced in June 2022 to two years and five months in jail after being convicted of seven charges of indecent assault against five victims including minors between 2000 and 2006. Disciple successfully appealed against his sentence to the High Court where Judge Jonathan Eaton reduced his sentence to 21 months. In addition, Disciple's name suppression was lifted, allowing the media to cover his case.

=== John Ready ===
On 7 March 2023, the Timaru Herald reported that a former Gloriavale farm manager John Ready had pleaded guilty at the Timaru District Court to assaulting two 11-year-old boys with a metal fence standard for disobeying him while performing farming chores at Gloriavale. Judge Jim Large remanded Ready on bail for sentencing on 13 June 2023 and also ordered that restorative justice options be explored with one of his former victims, who had since left Gloriavale.

=== Other charges of physical and sexual abuse ===
On 12 February 2021, the police laid charges of child abuse against two other members; an adult and a child.

On 4 August 2021, a former Gloriavale man pleaded guilty in the Greymouth District Court to eight charges of indecently assaulting girls, two charges of indecently assaulting a boy, and one count of sexual violation.

=== Official investigations ===
Stories of child abuse, rape, and other forms of cruelty and subjugation have emerged. A wide-ranging government investigation into the community began in 2015, leading to a number of charges. News of controversial practices in the community led to the police making daily checks on the community in 2018.

==== Operation Minneapolis ====
In July 2020, the New Zealand Police in conjunction with Oranga Tamariki launched Operation Minneapolis, an investigation into child abuse at Gloriavale, after receiving information about alleged abuse of an 11-year-old boy. In September 2020, a 20-year-old man was charged with doing an indecent act on three boys between the ages of 12 and 16 years. He was discharged in September 2021 without conviction after pleading guilty – the offences had occurred when he himself was a teenager and the court felt there was a low risk of him reoffending.

==== Independent inquiry of allegations of sexual abuse at Gloriavale ====
On 22 March 2021, 1News reported that two Christchurch-based lawyers Nicholas Davidson KC and Stephanie Grieve had been asked by the trustees of Gloriavale's governing Christian Church Community Trust to hold an independent inquiry of allegations of sexual abuse at Gloriavale.

==== Investigation into Gloriavale Christian School ====
On 11 August 2021, the New Zealand Police, Oranga Tamariki and the Teaching Council confirmed that they were investigating allegations of physical and sexual abuse of students at Gloriavale's school, which has 204 students ranging from Year 1 to Year 11. Several staff had also been stood down for unspecified reasons. Police claimed that at least 60 people in Gloriavale had been involved in "harmful sexual behaviour".

On 26 May 2022, the New Zealand Teachers' Disciplinary Tribunal suspended the teaching license of former Gloriavale Christian School principal Faithful Pilgrim for three years. Pilgrim had endorsed the teaching license of a teacher named Just Standfast, who had sexually abused a child on two occasions in 2012 and 2016. The Tribunal had investigated Pilgrim after receiving a complaint from the Gloriavale Leaders' Trust that he had endangered children by covering up the teacher's offending. Standfast pleaded guilty to a charge of sexual contact with a child in 2019.

In mid September 2022, Gloriavale Christian School principal Rachel Stedfast claimed that a small group of people had made a coordinated campaign to close down the school by filing complaints against most of its teachers. As a result of the complaints, the affected teachers had been suspended from their teaching duties while the complaints were being investigated. Stedfast stated that none of the suspended teachers had been accused of physical sexual abuse.

===== Abuse in Care inquiry =====
On 16 October 2025, Police and Oranga Tamariki revealed they conducted an investigation into the practice of silencing babies and children by covering their mouths and noses. During the Abuse in Care inquiry, they heard from ex-Gloriavale members that the group's founder, Hopeful Christian, taught parents to cover children's mouths and noses to stop them crying, until the child was struggling to breathe. As a result of the investigation, two unnamed Gloriavale members were given formal warnings. The Police and Oranga Tamariki conducted a meeting at Gloriavale to educate the community on the physical, emotional, and legal ramifications of the practice.

== Workplace exploitation ==
=== Venkata Rayavarapu's exploitation allegations ===
In October 2006, the Hindustan Times reported that Indian student Venkata Siva Rayavarapu had fled Gloriavale's West Coast commune after alleging that Gloriavale leaders were attempting to pressure him into marrying a Mexican woman against his wishes. Gloriavale had sponsored Rayavarapu to study English and agriculture at its accredited school. Rayavarapu alleged that he had been made to work at a dairy farm for six weeks without receiving any wages. Gloriavale leader Fervent Stedfast disputed Rayavarapu's account, claiming that he was attempting to marry a New Zealand girl to gain residency and that the community had sponsored him for the sole purpose of training him to help his own Indian community, which had been stated on his visa. Stedfast said that Rayavarapu was applying for a work visa to support his family in India. Immigration New Zealand subsequently revoked Rayavarapu's temporary permit.

=== Official investigations ===
In late September 2020, WorkSafe New Zealand dispatched inspectors to Gloriavale to investigate claims that some members had been forced to work for more than 20 hours a day. The news company Newshub also reported that current Gloriavale members had been targeted by the sect's leadership for speaking to the media. As a result of the Newshub investigation, Justice Minister Andrew Little had ordered the police, WorkSafe and the Labour Inspectorate to launch a second investigation into allegations of "controlling behaviour" and labour exploitation at Gloriavale.

On 1 October, Little, in his capacity as Minister of Workplace Relations, ordered a major review into practices at Gloriavale after Newshub obtained a government report from July 2017 reporting "oppressive psychological practices", possible exploitation, bullying, manipulation and coercion within the community. On 2 October, WorkSafe instructed Gloriavale's leadership to improve their work practices but found no evidence to suggest that the religious community was not managing the risk of workplace fatigue. WorkSafe had conducted a workplace assessment during which a team of four inspectors assessed Gloriavale, four subsidiary companies, and 13 workers.

On 10 August 2021, 1 News reported that several former Gloriavale members had alleged that they had been forced to sign a document waiving their right to legal advice when joining the community. The Labour Inspectorate also investigated a so-called partnership agreement as part of its inquiry into long working conditions.

=== May 2022 Employment Court ruling ===
On 21 February 2022, three former Gloriavale residents – Hosea Courage, Daniel Pilgrim and Levi Courage – challenged two earlier Labour Inspectorate inquiries in both 2017 and 2020, which found that they were volunteers and thus not entitled to pay or employment rights. Consequently, the Labour Inspectorate had declined to investigate the labour conditions, including alleged long working hours, at Gloriavale. The plaintiffs want the Employment Court to determine their employment status while they lived at Gloriavale and to determine whether they were exploited as workers. Courage alleged that Gloriavale residents were forced to work and beaten and starved as punishment for refusing to work or not working fast enough. Courage also alleged that he was beaten by his parents and authority figures.

On 10 May 2022, the Employment Court ruled in favour of Courage, Pilgrim and Courage's legal challenge, accepting that they had been employees at Gloriavale since the age of six. The Court found that the trio had been forced to perform "strenuous, difficult and sometimes dangerous" work when they were legally required to attend school. This landmark decision has the potential to encourage other former Gloriavale residents to pursue legal action against the religious community. In response to the Employment Court ruling, WorkSafe New Zealand confirmed that it would send inspectors to investigate conditions at Gloriavale. In addition, the Charities Commission commenced an investigation into Gloriavale's trust over allegations of unpaid child labour, beatings, and the withholding of food. If these allegations are proven, Gloriavale would lose its charitable status, costing it its donee status and tax benefits.

Following the Employment Court's ruling in May 2022, Silver Fern Farms announced on 24 May that it would no longer be supplying offal to Gloriavale's trading company Value Proteins. In addition, Westland Dairy suspended milk collection from Gloriavale–operated farms. In addition, meat processing company Alliance Group confirmed that it was reconsidering its relationship with Gloriavale in light of reports of labour exploitation. That same month, WorkSafe inspectors travelled to Gloriavale and issued nine improvement notices relating to the management of hazardous substances, machines and traffic at the community's grounds in Haupiri. By 15 August 2022, Gloriavale had complied with six of the nine notices, with the remaining three due to be completed by November 2022. In addition, WorkSafe had issued a total of 19 improvement notices to four Gloriavale businesses since September 2020.

In response to Westland Milk's actions, Gloriavale's subsidiary Canaan Farming Dairy sought a High Court injunction, prompting Westland to agree to continue collecting Canaan's milk until the Employment Court made a ruling on a second labour exploitation case filed by several former Gloriavale women. On 4 October, High Court Justice Jan-Marie Doogue ordered Westland Milk to continue collecting milk from Canaan Farming Dairy's three farms Bell Hill, Gloriavale and Glen Hopeful on the condition that it did not hire any minors or associate employees under the age of 18 years. In her ruling, Doogue ruled there was no evidence that Canaan had breached its obligations as an employer and that the company was not a party to the Employment Court case which had sparked the contract move suspension. She also rejected Westland's claim that it had lost customers as a result of its business relationship with Canaan Farming. Gloriavale Christian Community including Canaan Farming Dairy director Samuel Valor welcomed the High Court's ruling and emphasised the community's willingness to comply with employment requirements.

On 22 November 2024, the Employment Court ruled that the previous Overseeing Shepherd Hopeful Christian had been the employer of Courage, Pilgrim and Courage during the periods that the three plaintiffs had worked in the Gloriavale Community.

=== Second Employment Court case ===
In August 2022, Radio New Zealand reported that six former Gloriavale women named Serenity Pilgrim, Anna Courage, Rose Standtrue, Crystal Loyal, Pearl Valour and Virginia Courage had filed a second case with the Employment Court to determine whether they were employees or volunteers at Gloriavale. The case was set to begin on 29 August and expected to last three weeks. The Employment Court heard from 49 witnesses, who testified about various abuses including an alleged institutional culture of misogyny and victim blaming, sexual harassment of female members, and being forced to work for long hours with no breaks and little food.

Two witnesses, Naomi Pilgrim and Pearl Valor, testified about being denied medical treatment for various health issues including dental problems, damaged fingers, and sustaining back injuries from difficult and long working conditions. In early September, Virginia Courage and Rosanna Overcomer testified about community leaders shaming and sexually harassing female members of the community. On 19 September, one former Gloriavale leader, Zion Pilgrim, testified that the leadership had threatened to strip him of his leadership positions for raising concerns about sexual offending.

The following day, Pilgrim testified that Gloriavale had received millions in child welfare benefits from the New Zealand Government despite requiring children between the age of 6 and 18 years old to work long, punishing hours. On 21 September, Crystal testified that she had only been given one week of maternity leave after giving birth to her eldest child. She also testified that young mothers were expected to work long hours and were given little time to spend with their children. Trudy Christian testified about children being subject to frequent corporal punishment, while former member John Ready testified about his epileptic daughter suffering third degree burns after experiencing a seizure while working in the kitchen.

On 23 September, the defence opened its case. Gloriavale Christian School principal Rachel Stedfast disputed claims that the community's women were forced to work and mistreated by the elders, likening life there to a Māori marae. She testified that Gloriavale was a harmonious community where members happily worked and gave their wages to the community. On 27 September, defence witness Purity Valor testified that Gloriavale's leaders were unaware about sexual abuse within their community. She also claimed that media coverage of Gloriavale had resulted in the community being "slandered" and members receiving public abuse. On 28 September, the Employment Court heard testimony from Sarah Standtrue that Gloriavale's leadership had burnt a book that her husband had written, but that he had been readmitted to the community after apologising. Standtrue claimed that members of Gloriavale were free to leave. Standtrue's daughter Compassion testified that Gloriavale disputed allegations of members being overworked, abuse, and denied food and care.

On 29 September, Joanna Courage testified in defence of her grandfather Howard Temple, Gloriavale's Overseeing Shepherd. She disputed claims that Temple had abused or behaved inappropriately towards female members of the community. Courage also disputed the plaintiffs' allegations that they had been overworked. On 30 September, accountant Gordon Hansen testified that Gloriavale had received NZ$4.8 million in government funds in the 2021 financial year including NZ$2.3 million in Working for Families payments, NZ$2 million in early childcare education grants, NZ$283,000 in Ministry of Education grants and NZ$229,000 for midwifery services. Gloriavale's barrister Philip Skelton KC testified that the majority of Gloriavale's income came from its farming businesses, which generated NZ$19.5 million that year. The Employment Court case was adjourned until 2023.

In December 2022, Gloriavale confirmed that it would no longer hire the services of defence lawyer Philip Skelton KC since it was unable to sustain the costs of a legal team. The community Shepherds Samuel Valor, Howard Temple, Stephen Steadfast, Noah Hopeful and Faithful Pilgrim would instead conduct their own defence with the assistance of Peter Righteous. On 18 January 2023, Chief Employment Court Judge Jude Inglis confirmed that she would visit Gloriavale in February 2023 to better understand the evidence presented in Court. The trial was scheduled to restart in Christchurch on 13 February before shifting to Greymouth between 20 and 24 February.

On 13 February 2023, Gloriavale resident and mother Priscilla Stedfast gave testimony disputing earlier testimony by the six leavers – Standtrue, Valor, Pilgrim, Courage, Loyal and Courage – about harsh and abusive working conditions on Gloriavale. Stedfast stated that she was never an employee and never intended to be one. She testified that people were free to leave Gloriavale without being ostracised as the leavers suggested. Stedfast also testified that Gloriavale supported leavers by providing funds, transportation, and denied that they restricted contact between members and leavers. On 17 February, the Employment Court heard testimony detailing the sexual offending of the late Gloriavale founder Hopeful Christian. On 20 February, Gloriavale resident Temperance Hopeful argued in her testimony that introducing employment laws and wages would destroy Gloriavale's way of life. She alleged that the employment case was an attack on the commune's faith and disputed the plaintiffs' allegations of slave labour, describing it as a "labour of love to those who love to serve Christ by serving one another."

On 24 February, Chief Judge Christina Inglis along with lawyers, court staff, leavers Virginia and Anna Courage and Pearl Valor, and members of the media toured Gloriavale's Haupiri site to gain a better understanding of the reclusive community and the evidence being presented at Court. The tour was guided by Purity Valor and her husband Samuel Valor, a Shepherd in the community. On 27 February, Overseeing Shepherd Howard Temple admitted that Gloriavale's leaders had made mistakes and promised to report future abuses to the Police, rather than appealing for repentance and forgiveness. During cross-examination on 28 February, Temple rejected assertions by the leavers that Gloriavale's leadership imposed their religious faith on the community's children through isolation and ignorance, contending that the community sought to protect their children from "sinful" world influences.

On 1 March, Temple confirmed during testimony at the Employment Court that Police were investigating allegations of forced labour, slavery and servitude at Gloriavale. On 20 March, the Employment Court heard testimony from the plaintiffs' lawyers that the Crown had known about Gloriavale founder Hopeful Christian's sexual abuse crimes since the mid-1990s but had failed to help the community deal with his crimes.

On 28 March, Gloriavale leader Samuel Valor apologised for delaying proceedings after the community's leadership hired a lawyer named Carter Pearce despite earlier claiming that the community could not afford legal counsel. Gloriavale leavers lawyer Brian Henry stated that he had only learned about Pearce's hiring on 26 March, a day before the Employment Court hearing resumed on 27 March. In late March, the Employment Court heard closing arguments from the defendants and the plaintiffs. On 29 March, Gloriavale's lawyer Pearce and Valor disputed the plaintiffs' assertions that Gloriavale had exploited and mistreated them. They argued that Gloriavale was a voluntary religious community and not a "hidden capitalist market" as the plaintiffs claimed. On 30 March, the plaintiff's lawyer Henry argued that Gloriavale entrapped and exploited its female members from birth through religion and education, resulting in them being subservient to the community's patriarchal leadership. He argued that the plaintiffs were employees rather than volunteers. Justice Inglis has reserved her decision.

On 13 July, Employment Court Judge Inglis ruled that the six plaintiffs Courage, Valor, Pilgrim, Standtrue, Courage and Loyal were employees rather than volunteers at Gloriavale. In her judgement, Inglis stated that girls and women in the community were raised from young to work in "deliberately-gendered roles including cooking, cleaning and washing clothes" and that the plaintiffs were born into and kept in "servitude" (which is illegal under New Zealand law). Inglis also found that dissenters were threatened or punished with exclusion from the community. While the decision was hailed as a long-fought victory by the plaintiffs including Courage, Gloriavale's senior leadership confirmed that they would appeal the Employment Court's decision. In addition, the Labour Inspectorate confirmed that it would reopen its investigation and consider enforcement action if the women were found to be employees.

On 9 December, the Court of Appeal dismissed most of Gloriavale's appeal against the second Employment Court ruling. While the Court declined leave on four questions of the law, they identified and invited submissions on two of these questions. On 15 December, Employment Court Chief Judge Inglis ruled that the "Overseeing Shepherd" at Gloriavale was the employer of the six female plaintiffs. The Overseeing Shepherd at the time was Howard Temple.

=== Investigation into Gloriavale School ===
On 17 July 2023, the Education Review Office (ERO) launched a review into Gloriavale School in light of the Employment court ruling that girls were only provided with a limited education that prepared them for life in the sect.

On 30 October 2023, ERO released its review on Gloriavale School. The report found that Gloriavale did not meet many of the criteria for registering as a private school and identified several problems including the school not providing tuition beyond Year 10, that the quality of tuition was below the standard of many state schools, inadequate staffing levels, and that female pupils were offered a lower quality of education than male pupils. In addition, 26 pupils in the so-called "Awhina class" were taught at home by their mothers.

On 3 July 2025, ERO released its second review on Gloriavale School. While the agency found that Gloriavale had made some improvements during its second visit in late 2024, it concluded that the school had failed three of the eight registration criteria: namely providing suitable staffing for children with complex additional needs, suitable equipment for children with complex emotional needs, or a physically and emotionally safe space. The report found that 40 percent of Gloriavale's school aged population attended the school while about half were homeschooled and the rest were enrolled with correspondence school Te Kura On 18 December, the Ministry of Education cancelled Gloriavale School's registration, citing insufficient evidence that the school was complying with registration criteria. The deregistration is expected to come into effect on 23 January 2026.

On 22 January 2026, the Ministry of Education confirmed two options for school-age children in Gloriavale: allowing students to enrol at an existing state school in the West Coast and operating a Te Kura hub at Gloriavale. The Education Ministry also confirmed it was negotiating establishing a Gloriavale unit as part of an existing state school. On 23 January, the cancellation of Gloriavale School's registration was delayed after the school board sought a judicial review by the High Court of the Education Ministry's decision to cancel its registration.

On 3 September 2026, the Secretary of Education Ellen MacGregor-Reid confirmed that Ministry would cancel Gloriavale's registration, citing a special ERO review finding that the "school was not a physically and emotionally safe place for students." The Ministry of Education also sought to lift High Court orders preventing the school's closure. In response, a spokesperson for the Gloriavale Christian School Board expressed opposition to the Ministry's decision to cancel the school's registration and said it was considering legal options. The Children's Commissioner Jane Searle supported the Ministry's decision, while stating that Gloriavale children needed carefully managed transition plans and assistance to protect their education and well-being.

=== Joint agency response ===
In August 2022, the Sixth Labour Government set up a joint agency response to work on five key outcomes for Gloriavale community members: Glorivale members working without threat of punishment and receiving minimum legal entitlements, upholding children's rights, ensuring that children received an education and were not exploited for commercial gain, zero tolerance for serious harm and allowing people to freely leave the community. Despite the Ministry of Business, Innovation and Employment's (MBIE) concerns that ending the arrangement could undermine trust between Gloriavale and government agencies, Cabinet members of the National-led coalition government decided not to extend the arrangement beyond 31 December 2023. On 30 March 2024, this arrangement was reported by Radio New Zealand. The Education Review Office also reviewed Gloriavale's school, home schooling programme, and delivery of Te Kura. In addition, Gloriavale submitted progress reports to the Ministry of Social Development every six weeks.

In December 2023, barrister Brian Henry sent a letter to Prime Minister Christopher Luxon calling for Gloriavale to be shut down. He also criticised the joint agency response for prioritising reforming Gloriavale over protecting victims of abuse. Henry also accused previous governments and agencies of enabling what he described as a "sex cult cloaked in Christianity." On 27 March 2024, Henry filed proceedings against four government agencies (Oranga Tamariki, the Department of Internal Affairs, Ministry of Social Development and Labour Inspectorate), accusing them of knowingly allowing abuse to happen at Gloriavale.

=== Coronial inquiry into Sincere Standtrue's death ===
Beginning on 20 May 2024, Coroner Alexandra Cunninghame held an inquiry into the death of 20-year old Sincere Standtrue, who sustained critical injuries on 23 October 2018 at a Gloriavale paintshop where he worked. He subsequently died at Christchurch Hospital on 2 November. The inquiry will consider whether Standtrue's death was a suicide or whether he died in different circumstances. The inquiry will be held in June and August 2024, and will hear from witnesses about Standtrue's state of mind at the time of his death, allegations of bullying and harmful sexual behaviour, how Standtrue coped with life in the community and other factors that caused his death. Over 50 witnesses are expected to testify. On 23 May, his younger sister Rose Standtrue testified that her brother endured bullying, shaming, and beatings at Gloriavale.

On 19 March 2025, Coroner Cunnighame ruled that Standtrue's death was an accident caused by "blacking out" rather than suicide. Standtrue's sister Rose disputed the Coroner's finding and criticised both the inquiry and the Police investigation for allegedly leaving out information.

=== Third Employment Court case ===
In mid-August 2026, nine former Gloriavale members sought legal damages and declarations of slavery and servitude after Employment Court Judge Christina Inglis ruled that the Labour Inspectorate had failed to properly investigate allegations of forced labour, child labour, slavery and servitude at Gloriavale between 2017 and 2021. The Employment Court also found that labour inspectors's failure to investigate the conditions of children was a legal error due to legislation defining an "employee" as a "person of any age." The nine plaintiffs have each sought $250,000, totaling $2.25 million in damages.

== Civil litigation ==
=== John Ready's 2021 civil lawsuit ===
In February 2021, former Gloriavale member John Ready filed a civil claim at the Christchurch High Court seeking to remove the board of trustees of the Christian Church Community Trust, the registered charity behind Gloriavale, and replace them with a public trust. Defendants named in the lawsuit included Fervent Steadfast, Faithful Pilgrim and Gloriavale leader Howard Temple.

In mid-May 2021, Stuff and The New Zealand Herald obtained court documents relating to Ready's lawsuit against Gloriavale. The plaintiffs' lawyer alleged that the community bred sexual predators, exploited members as forced labour, and required members to give up all their possessions, including property, money, and any future earnings, to the Christian Church Community Trust. Gloriavale's leadership denied these allegations, contesting that they were untrue or historical.

The legal action concluded 10 June 2021, with the Christian Community Charitable Trust agreeing to be overseen by the Public Trust for a period of 18 months. During this time the Public Trust would provide regular reports to the High Court of New Zealand.

=== BNZ bank accounts dispute ===
In late 2022, the Bank of New Zealand (BNZ) attempted to close Gloriavale's commercial accounts, citing an employment court ruling in May 2022 that found that three former members were employees rather than volunteers. In November 2022, Justice Rachel Dunningham ordered BNZ to keep Gloriavale's bank accounts open pending a hearing in late May 2023. On 30 May 2023, in a hearing at the Christchurch High Court chaired by Justice Helen Cull, Gloriavale sought an interim injunction to keep its BNZ bank accounts open pending a trial. Gloriavale's lawyer Richard Raymond KC argued that Gloriavale had not breached the bank's terms and conditions. He also questioned BNZ's decision to use a Wikipedia page listing at least 17 allegations against the community as evidence. BNZ's lawyer Will Irving defended the bank's right to terminate customers' bank accounts at any time and argued that Gloriavale's alleged use of forced child labour breached BNZ's human rights policy.

In September 2023, the High Court ruled that BNZ be required to continue providing banking services for the community. In late June 2024, the Court of Appeal of New Zealand allowed BNZ to challenge an interim injunction requiring the bank to keep Gloriavale's accounts open until a trial could determine whether BNZ could terminate its relationship with Gloriavale.

On 9 December 2024, the Court of Appeal upheld an appeal by BNZ against the injunction preventing the closure of Gloriavale's accounts. BNZ agreed to continue providing banking services to Gloriavale for a period of three months from the date of the Court's decision. The court proceedings affected 16 Glorivale-owned entities and a total of 83 bank accounts. BNZ would continue to bank with some individuals affiliated with the community. Following the ruling, Gloriavale's trust's chief executive Phil Jamieson said that the closure of Gloriavale's bank accounts would not affect the community's existence.

=== 2024 class action lawsuit ===
On 23 July 2024, four former Gloriavale members, Anna Courage; Pearl Valor; Gideon Benjamin and Hosea Courage, filed a NZ$10 million class action lawsuit against Gloriavale and five government agencies, claiming they had been held as slaves since birth by the community's leaders. The plaintiffs also sought a High Court ruling that the New Zealand Government had breached international treaties by failing to protect children from child labour.

== Media coverage ==
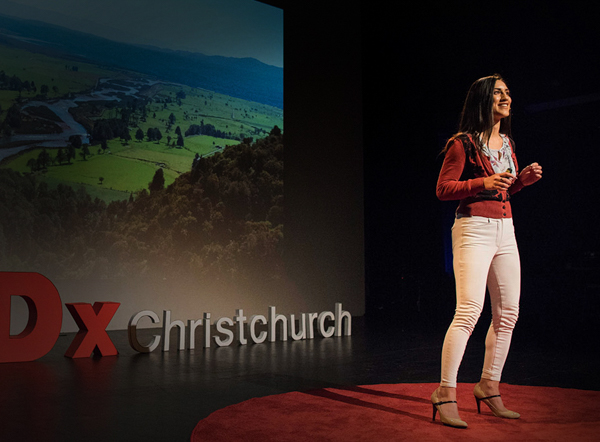
Lilia Tarawa at TEDxChristchurch, 2017

In 2016, a three-part documentary on TVNZ 2 extensively covered the community, with the documentary team being given unprecedented access to the community. The series is available online within New Zealand. An additional set of 8 mini-episodes, titled Gloriavale: The Return was released in 2018. Television channels made additional films about the community in 2017 and 2018. In 2022, the documentary film Gloriavale was released, profiling the community and the Ready family court case.

In 2017, Lilia Tarawa, the granddaughter of Gloriavale's founder, spoke at a TEDx Christchurch conference on her experiences growing up as a member of the community. The talk was inspired by her autobiographical book Daughter of Gloriavale, released the same year. Tarawa described abusive practices as part of daily life for members of Gloriavale, including beatings, forced marriages, and psychological control, leading some of Gloriavale's members – including some of Tarawa's siblings – to run away from the community. The video of Tarawa's talk became widely popular online following its upload to YouTube. As of May 2023, the video had over 12 million views.

In late March 2024, TVNZ produced a three-part miniseries entitled Escaping Utopia. The final episode focused on Gloriavale's satellite commune in the Indian state of Tamil Nadu. In the episode, Gloriavale leavers Theo Pratt and Roseanna Overcomer visited Pratt's sister Precious at the Indian branch. Allegations of rape and human trafficking in the Indian commune were aired in the documentary.

== Public apology in 2022 ==
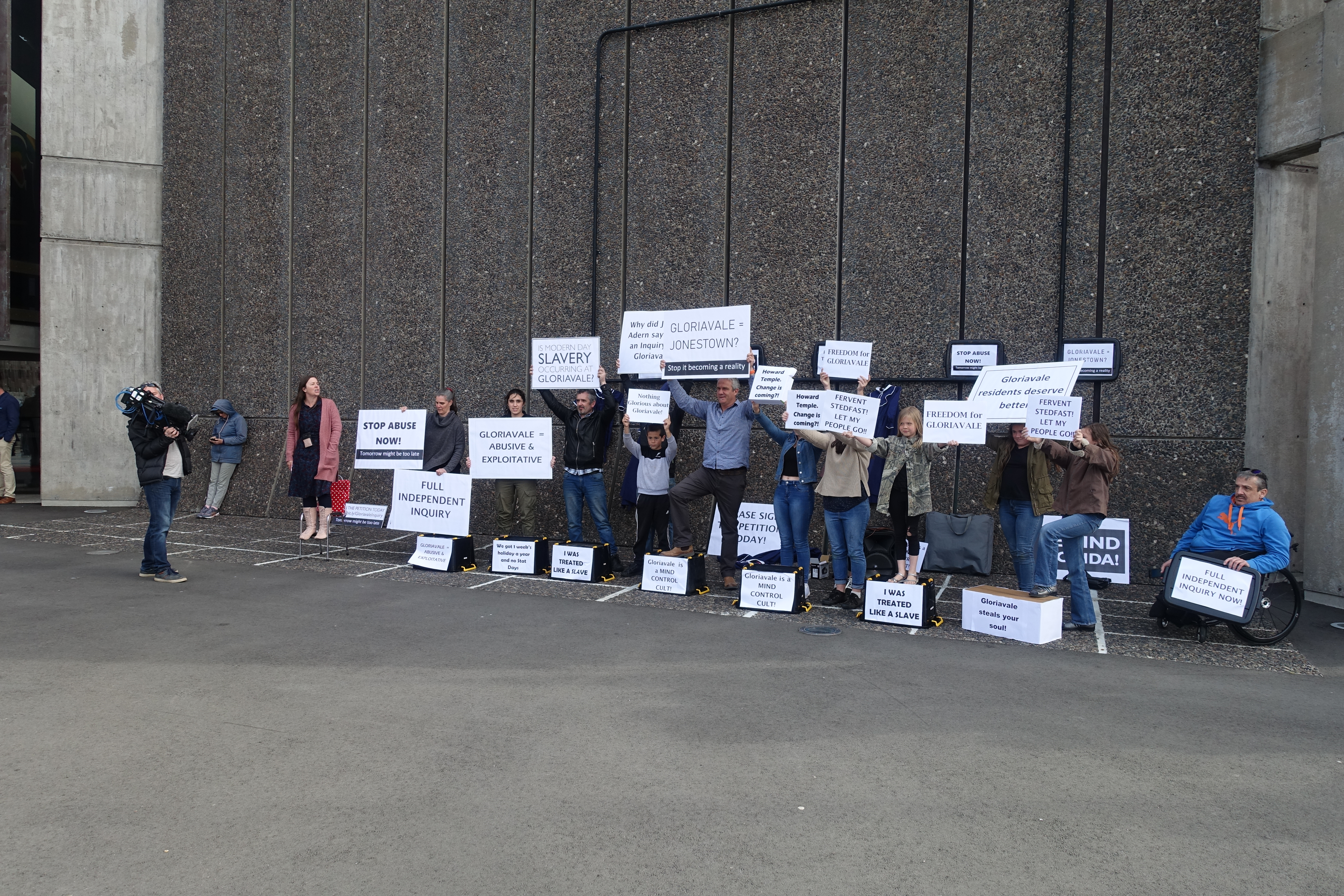
Former Gloriavale members protesting at The Press leaders' debate in October 2020

On 27 May 2022, Gloriavale's leadership issued a public apology for sexual abuse, child abuse and labour exploitation that had occurred within the community. They claimed that much had changed at Gloriavale following the resignation of their previous leader and founder in 2018. The leaders agreed to allow young people to make decisions on whether to continue living at Gloriavale once they had matured. To address future sexual offending, the leadership established a "Child Protection Leads team" that answered directly to Oranga Tamariki (the Ministry of Children). The leadership also claimed to have developed a new child protection policy which encouraged members to report acts of abuse to the police, Child Protection Leads team, and Oranga Tamariki. They also said that they had restructured their business operations to allow parents to spend more time with their children after 3pm.

On 31 May, two senior Gloriavale leaders, Fervent Steadfast and Faithful Pilgrim, resigned from their positions as senior community leaders following the public apology. Steadfast had previously served as Gloriavale's financial controller and had been accused of mishandling employment issues in the community. Pilgrim had previously served as the principal of Gloriavale Christian School until his resignation in 2020 for failing to protect pupils in his care.

== Satellite communes ==
=== Indian commune ===
In 2015, TVNZ's Seven Sharp programme reported that Hopeful Christian and other Gloriavale leaders had purchased land in the Indian state of Tamil Nadu. The community was settled by several young Gloriavale women from New Zealand and local Indian Christian converts. According to the website Indiafacts, Gloriavale worked with the charity Smile Help Charity Trust in Andhra Pradesh to purchase land for their commune in Tamil Nadu's Cheranmahadevi region in the Tirunelveli district between 2011 and 2012. Gloriavale also registered a charity called the Christian Community Church to channel funds from New Zealand to their Indian commune. In October 2021, the Hindu Post alleged that eight Indian children residing at the commune had been forcibly converted to Christianity.

In late March 2024, the TVNZ documentary series Escaping Utopia reported that Gloriavale had an offshoot commune in southern India consisting of five New Zealand women, their husbands and at least 32 children. The Indian commune is overseen by Overseeing Shepherd Faithful Stronghold, an Indian convert who had attended the Gloriavale school in New Zealand. The documentary alleged that members of the Indian commune had experienced sexual abuse. New Zealand Police confirmed they had received a formal letter on the matter. Human rights lawyer Deborah Manning expressed concerns about the welfare of the Gloriavale members abroad. In response, Gloriavale's Peter Righteous said that the New Zealand women had travelled to India and married of their own free will, and that they maintained contact with and visited their New Zealand relatives. According to Manning, children in the Indian commune lacked birth certificates and identity documents. Several government agencies including the Ministry of Business, Innovation and Employment (MBIE), the Police, Oranga Tamariki and the Ministry of Foreign Affairs and Trade (MFAT) confirmed they were aware of trafficking allegations at the Indian commune.

=== Lake Brunner commune ===
In March 2023, Senior leader Samuel Valor confirmed that the community was building another commune on the edge of Lake Brunner, on the west coast of the South Island of New Zealand, to house its growing population, which had risen to almost 600 by 2023. Gloriavale purchased the site for NZ$3 million using funds from its charitable trust and three businesses. In 2021, Gloriavale obtained resource consent to move three dwellings and several school buildings to Lake Brunner and in 2023 it obtained permission to build an unattached house on the site.

== Gloriavale Leavers' Support Trust ==
The Gloriavale Leavers' Support Trust was founded in 2019 to provide practical support to people leaving the community. They also advocate the needs and rights of the people who have left the community, as well as those who remain within it. In mid-June 2021, the Trust launched an Emergency Welfare Appeal campaign including a video to help former Gloriavale residents reintegrate into the outside world.

== See also ==
- Lilia Tarawa, former member of Gloriavale, author, speaker, entrepreneur
- Gloriavale, 2022 New Zealand documentary film
