= Antonio Pelayo (artist) =

American artist, illustrator, and event producer

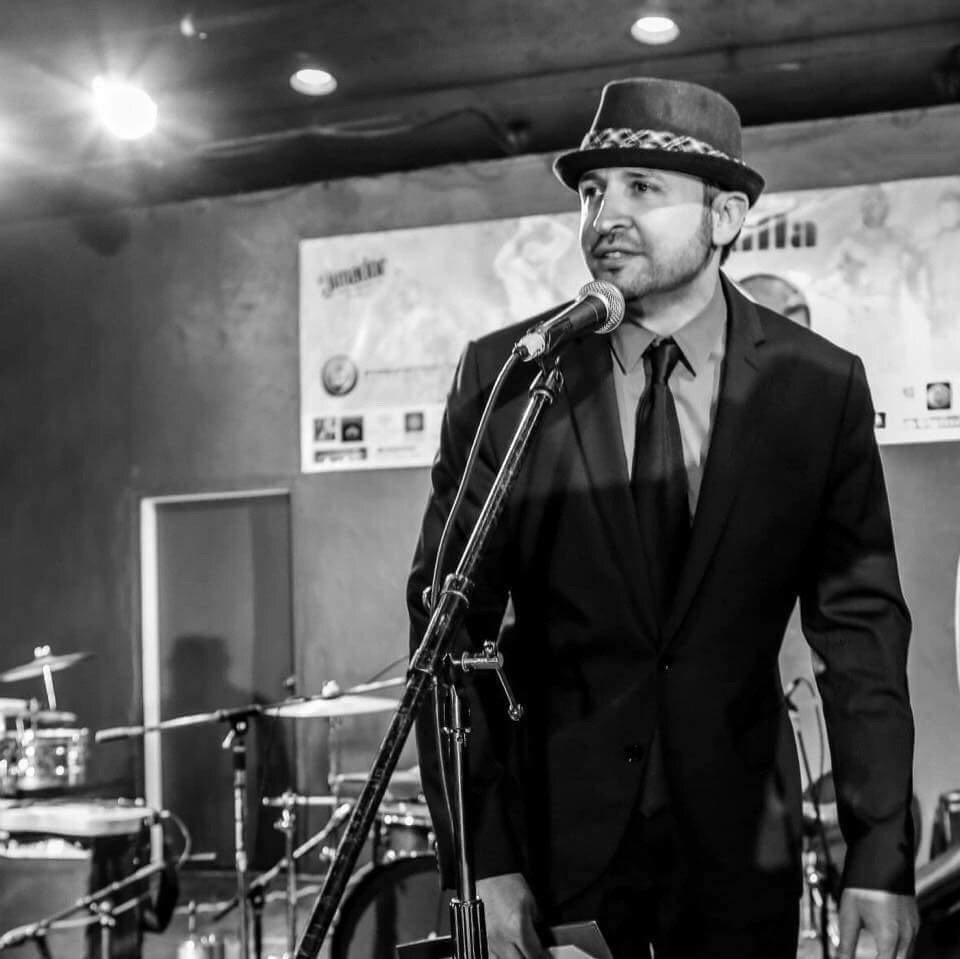
- Pelayo in 2020
- Born: Glendale, California, US
- Known for: Illustration
- Website: antoniopelayo.com

Antonio Pelayo is an artist, illustrator, and event producer who focuses on the Latino community of Southern California. He is also an inker at the Walt Disney Animation Studios Ink & Paint Department.

== Biography ==
Pelayo was born in Glendale, California. As a child, he relocated to central Mexico alongside his family. He was raised as a Jehovah's Witness, and as a teenager took an active role in the community, which allowed him to lead congregations of several hundred people at a very young age. He spent much of his time in his youth honing his craft as an artist. After returning to Glendale, Pelayo's family settled near the Walt Disney Studios in Burbank. Pelayo would often daydream of being an illustrator at Disney Studios. As a teenager, Pelayo took a temporary job at Disney Studios.

Early on in his career, Pelayo exhibited his own work in different venues across Los Angeles. Quickly building a network of artists friends, made him realize he could branch out on his individual practice and began to produce his own art showcases featuring artists, performers, designers and creatives from the Latino community of Southern California. He has hosted "El Velorio," an annual event since 2009 that converges with Dia de Los Muertos festivities. Other events Pelayo regularly produces include "La Bulla," a celebration of Luchadores, and "Tatuaje," a showcase of Chicano tattoo art.

Pelayo is the father of artist Isaac Pelayo.
