= List of 2003 box office number-one films in Mexico =

This is a list of films which placed number one at the weekly box office in Mexico for the year 2003.

== Number-one films ==
#	Date	Film	Gross (USD)	Openings in the top ten
1	January 5, 2003	Catch Me If You Can	$2,411,291	
2	January 12, 2003	My Big Fat Greek Wedding	$1,609,627	Fear dot com (#7), Jackass: The Movie (#8), The Banger Sisters (#10)
3	January 19, 2003	La hija del caníbal	$1,541,742	8 Mile (#3), Simone (#8)
4	January 26, 2003	Sweet Home Alabama	$1,135,407	Star Trek: Nemesis (#10)
5	February 2, 2003	Gangs of New York	$2,092,610	Abandon (#10)
6	February 9, 2003	Just Married	$1,303,665	
7	February 16, 2003	Two Weeks Notice	$1,645,751	I Spy (#3)
8	February 23, 2003	Two Weeks Notice	$1,100,269	Empire (#6), La Mano del Zurdo (#7), Belphégor - Le fantôme du Louvre (#9), Adaptation (#10)
9	March 2, 2003	Chicago	$1,261,153	Analyze That (#4), Ballistic: Ecks vs. Sever (#5)
10	March 9, 2003	Maid in Manhattan	$1,177,784	The Hours (#5), The Life of David Gale (#6)
11	March 16, 2003	Daredevil	$2,736,749	About Schmidt (#4)
12	March 23, 2003	Kangaroo Jack	$1,510,795	The Recruit (#3), The Pianist (#4)
13	March 30, 2003	The Hot Chick	$1,730,615	The Core (#2), Half Past Dead (#8), Far from Heaven (#9)
14	April 6, 2003	The Hot Chick	$1,436,076	Tears of the Sun (#2), Final Destination 2 (#5), The Four Feathers (#9)
15	April 13, 2003	The Jungle Book 2	$1,803,827	Darkness Falls (#3), The Wild Thornberrys Movie (#8), Solaris (#10)
16	April 20, 2003	The Jungle Book 2	$1,442,784	Johnny English (#4)
17	April 27, 2003	How to Lose a Guy in 10 Days	$1,094,239	National Security (#7)
18	May 4, 2003	X2: X-Men United	$4,988,709	Asesino en serio (#2), Piglet's Big Movie (#5)
19	May 11, 2003	X2: X-Men United	$2,786,753	Shanghai Knights (#4), Old School (#5)
20	May 18, 2003	X2: X-Men United	$1,855,579	The Hunted (#2)
21	May 25, 2003	The Matrix Reloaded	$5,814,951	Pinocchio (#8)
22	June 1, 2003	The Matrix Reloaded	$3,021,546	Bringing Down the House (#2), My Little Eye (#5), Chasing Papi (#7)
23	June 8, 2003	Anger Management	$1,706,360	The Emperor's Club (#8), Extreme Ops (#10)
24	June 15, 2003	2 Fast 2 Furious	$3,094,708	Sin Ton ni Sonia (#2), Cradle 2 the Grave (#6)
25	June 22, 2003	2 Fast 2 Furious	$1,942,592	Daddy Day Care (#2), Phone Booth (#4), Dame tu Cuerpo (#5), Rugrats Go Wild (#6), Biker Boyz (#10)
26	June 29, 2003	Hulk	$5,872,127	Ripley's Game (#10)
27	July 6, 2003	Finding Nemo	$7,002,432	Boat Trip (#6), Drumline (#10)
28	July 13, 2003	Finding Nemo	$4,382,470	Charlie's Angels: Full Throttle (#2), Agent Cody Banks (#4), The Magdalene Sisters (#7)
29	July 20, 2003	Bruce Almighty	$5,162,060	Sinbad: Legend of the Seven Seas (#4)
30	July 27, 2003	Terminator 3: Rise of the Machines	$4,649,456	Legally Blonde 2: Red, White and Blonde (#5)
31	August 3, 2003	Pirates of the Caribbean: The Curse of the Black Pearl	$4,234,902	Avassaladoras (#10)
32	August 10, 2003	Pirates of the Caribbean: The Curse of the Black Pearl	$2,657,279	Lara Croft Tomb Raider: The Cradle of Life (#3), Corazón de melón (#6), Holes (#8)
33	August 17, 2003	Pirates of the Caribbean: The Curse of the Black Pearl	$1,581,989	Hollywood Homicide (#2), 28 Days Later (#4), What a Girl Wants (#5), A Man Apart (#8)
34	August 24, 2003	The Italian Job	$1,193,050	
35	August 31, 2003	The Italian Job	$932,490	Down with Love (#4), Dumb and Dumberer: When Harry Met Lloyd (#10)
36	September 7, 2003	American Wedding	$1,538,542	Alex and Emma (#10)
37	September 14, 2003	The League of Extraordinary Gentlemen	$2,839,399	Bad Boys II (#2), The Lizzie McGuire Movie (#4), Spirited Away (#7)
39	September 21, 2003	The League of Extraordinary Gentlemen	$1,643,613	Freddy vs. Jason (#4), Confidence (#7)
40	September 28, 2003	The League of Extraordinary Gentlemen	$1,088,954	Matchstick Men (#3)
41	October 5, 2003	Identity	$668,111	Wrong Turn (#3)
42	October 12, 2003	Spy Kids 3-D: Game Over	$2,241,899	Basic (#2), El Otro Lado de la Cama (#8)
43	October 19, 2003	Spy Kids 3-D: Game Over	$1,898,599	S.W.A.T. (#2), Intolerable Cruelty (#3)
44	October 26, 2003	Spy Kids 3-D: Game Over	$1,168,888	Once Upon a Time in Mexico (#2), La Tregua (#7), Le Pacte du Silence (#9), Alien: The Director's Cut (#10)
45	November 2, 2003	Spy Kids 3-D: Game Over	$848,576	Jeepers Creepers 2 (#5), The Order (#6), The Medallion (#10)
46	November 9, 2003	The Matrix Revolutions	$3,215,529	Under the Tuscan Sun (#8)
47	November 16, 2003	The Matrix Revolutions	$1,786,160	Runaway Jury (#2), Gigli (#9)
48	November 23, 2003	21 Grams	$1,756,494	Freaky Friday (#2), Magos y Gigantes (#4)
49	November 30, 2003	Looney Tunes: Back in Action	$1,452,493	Kill Bill: Volume 1 (#4), The In-Laws (#6)
50	December 7, 2003	Looney Tunes: Back in Action	$956,546	The Cat in the Hat (#2), Mystic River (#6), Love Actually (#7)
51	December 14, 2003	Ladies' Night	$1,554,028	Stuck on You (#4), Beyond Borders (#10)
52	December 21, 2003	The Lord of the Rings: The Return of the King	$5,134,776	Brother Bear (#2)
53	December 28, 2003	The Lord of the Rings: The Return of the King	$3,948,747	Mona Lisa Smile (#3), Elf (#5)

== Highest-grossing films ==
Highest-grossing films of 2003
Rank	Title	Distributor	Gross (USD)
1.	Finding Nemo	Disney	$17,841,841
2.	The Lord of the Rings: The Return of the King	Warner Bros.	$15,626,424
3.	X2: X-Men United	20th Century Fox	$14,138,528
4.	Brother Bear	Disney	$13,652,622
5.	Bruce Almighty	Buena Vista	$13,614,792
6.	The Matrix Reloaded	Warner Bros.	$12,902,350
7.	Hulk	Universal	$11,817,780
8.	Pirates of the Caribbean: The Curse of the Black Pearl	Disney	$10,953,762
9.	Terminator 3: Rise of the Machines	Sony	$8,975,367
10.	Spy Kids 3D: Game Over	Buena Vista	$8,223,986

== See also ==
- List of Mexican films — Mexican films by year

Preceded by 2002	2003	Succeeded by 2004
