= Dave Smith (archivist) =

Founder of the Walt Disney Archives

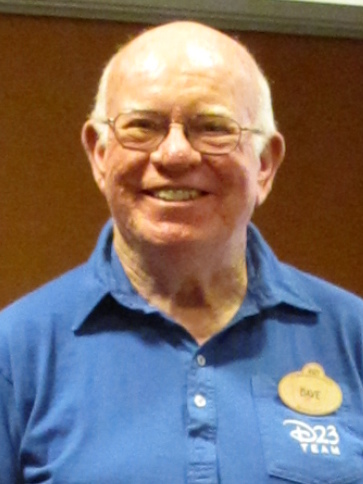
- Smith in 2010
- Born: David Rollin Smith; October 13, 1940; Pasadena, California, U.S
- Died: February 15, 2019 (aged 78); Burbank, California, U.S.
- Occupations: Archivist, historian
- Known for: Founder of the Walt Disney Archives
- Notable work: Disney A to Z
- Honours: Disney Legend (2007)

David Rollin Smith (October 13, 1940 – February 15, 2019) was the founder and chief archivist of the Walt Disney Archives, the corporate archive of The Walt Disney Company.

== Early life and education ==
Smith was born on October 13, 1940, and raised in Pasadena, California, the son of librarians and educators. He appreciated Disney movies as a child and, having lived in Southern California, visited Disneyland Park frequently, even attending the park's annual Grad Nite event when he was a high school senior.

Smith met Walt Disney once at Disneyland and asked Disney for his autograph. Disney politely declined (he didn't want to attract attention to himself) and told Smith to write to the studio and request an autograph. Smith did as requested and received an autographed card in the mail.

Smith graduated from UC Berkeley with a BA in history and a master's degree in library science. Once graduated, Smith spent time working in the manuscript department at the Huntington Library in San Marino, California. He then spent a year and a half as an intern at the Library of Congress in Washington, D.C., and then moved back to California and worked as a research librarian at UCLA for five years. While at UCLA, he authored several bibliographies, including ones on the CSS Virginia and USS Monitor ironclad warships as well as Jack Benny.

== Disney career ==
While at UCLA in 1967, with approval of Walt Disney Productions (now The Walt Disney Company), Smith began compiling a bibliography on Walt Disney, which he spent more than a year researching. The company was impressed with Smith's skills and requested his services as an archival consultant in 1969. Smith took a leave of absence from UCLA and his first Disney assignment was cataloguing and photographing Walt Disney's offices, which had been left relatively untouched since Disney died in 1966.

Smith completed his work in December 1969 and wrote out a proposal for the establishment of a corporate archive for Disney—piggybacking off of company co-founder (and brother of Walt Disney) Roy O. Disney's desire to preserve the company's history. After six months of deliberation, the proposal was accepted and Smith joined the company full time on June 22, 1970, as Disney's first archivist. Over the next 40 years, Smith and the archives staff steadily grew the collection to include company files, a library of books, movie props, costumes, artwork, pieces of Disney Park attractions, and more.

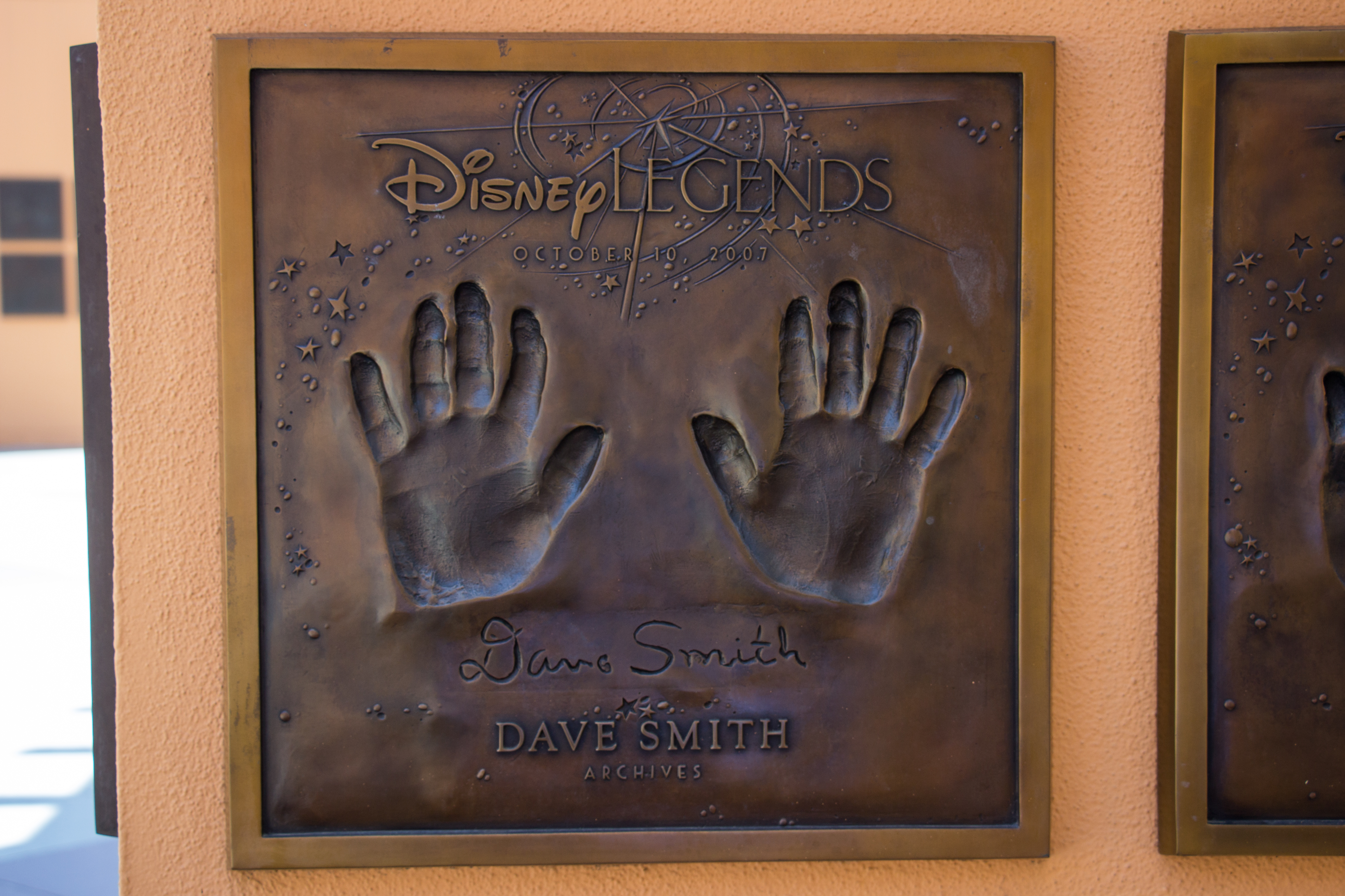
Smith's Disney Legends plaque in Legends Plaza at the Walt Disney Studios in Burbank

Between 1980 and 2001, Smith was the executive director of The Manuscript Society. He was also a member of the Society of California Archivists. In 2007, Smith received the Disney Legend Award, an honor given to people who have made significant contributions to The Walt Disney Company. According to Disney fans and historians, Smith was regarded as the final authority on the topic of Disney history.

Smith was a Disney fan favorite and would often make appearances, sign books, and give lectures at fan events. He also traveled to the Disney resorts around the world, as well as on the Disney Cruise Line and at the D23 Expo—delivering presentations to both guests and employees on Disney history.

On June 24, 2010, 40 years after he began work at Disney, Smith retired. After retirement, he continued to work for Disney as a consultant.

== Death and legacy ==
Dave Smith died on February 15, 2019, in Pasadena, California. Remarking on Smith's death, Disney CEO Bob Iger said, "He was the unsung hero of Disney's history who, as our first archivist, spent 40 years rescuing countless documents and artifacts from obscurity, investing endless hours restoring and preserving these priceless pieces of our legacy, and putting them in context to tell our story. Dave was a true Disney Legend, and we are indebted to him for building such an enduring, tangible connection to our past that continues to inspire our future."

On January 24, 2022, Smith was given a window on Main Street, U.S.A. in Disneyland Park posthumously for his contributions to the preservation of the park's history. The window is located above the entrance of the Fortuosity Shop.

== Written works ==
Smith wrote and co-wrote many books on Disney history, including Disney A to Z, the official company encyclopedia, as well as The Ultimate Disney Trivia Books. He also wrote short pieces and columns in publications like Starlog, Manuscripts, American Archivist, and The California Historical Quarterly. Smith's "Ask Dave" article was printed in Disney Magazine and Disney Channel Magazine, and continued online on the D23 website and Disney Insider when the magazine was discontinued in 2001.

=== As author ===
- Walt Disney: Famous Quotes (1994)
- Disney A to Z (1996)
- Disney A to Z, second edition (1998)
- The Quotable Walt Disney (2001)
- Disney A to Z, third edition (2006)
- Disney Trivia from the Vault: Secrets Revealed and Questions Answered (2012)
- Disney A to Z, fourth edition (2015)
- Disney Facts Revealed: Answers to Fans' Curious Questions (2016)
- Disney A to Z, fifth edition (2016)

=== As co-author ===
- The Ultimate Disney Trivia Book (1992)—with Kevin Neary
- The Ultimate Disney Trivia Book 2 (1994)—with Kevin Neary
- The Ultimate Disney Trivia Book 3 (1997)—with Kevin Neary
- Disney: The First 100 Years (1999)—with Steven Clark
- The Ultimate Disney Trivia Book 4 (2000)—with Kevin Neary
- Disney: The First 100 Years, updated edition (2002)—with Steven Clark
- Disney A to Z, sixth edition* (2023)—with Steven Vagnini

*posthumous release
