= List of 2002 box office number-one films in Mexico =

This is a list of films which placed number one at the weekly box office for the year 2002.

== Number-one films ==
#	Date	Film	Gross (USD)	Openings in the top ten
1	January 10, 2002	The Lord of the Rings: The Fellowship of the Ring	$2,268,616	Riding in Cars with Boys (#5), El Poseido (#10)
2	January 17, 2002	American Pie 2	$2,270,133	Spy Game (#2), Sexy Beast (#9)
3	January 24, 2002	American Pie 2	$1,624,060	Behind Enemy Lines (#2), Un Mundo Raro (#7), Help! I'm a Fish (#10)
4	January 31, 2002	Vivir Mata	$1,303,339	The One (#2), Jeepers Creepers (#3), Hearts in Atlantis (#9)
5	February 7, 2002	Ocean's Eleven	$4,106,239	
6	February 14, 2002	Ocean's Eleven	$2,364,261	D-Tox (#3), Corazones Rotos (#10)
11	March 21, 2002	Ice Age	$5,993,043	I Am Sam (#5), The Majestic (#9), The Royal Tenenbaums (#10)
12	March 28, 2002	Ice Age	$5,078,780	Return to Never Land (#4)
13	April 4, 2002	Ice Age	$3,539,582	Jimmy Neutron: Boy Genius (#2), E.T. (20th Anniversary) (#3)
15	April 18, 2002	The Count of Monte Cristo	$1,278,327	Not Another Teen Movie (#4), Hart's War (#5)
16	April 25, 2002	The Count of Monte Cristo	$1,040,712	Kate & Leopold (#3), Joe Somebody (#6)
17	May 2, 2002	The Scorpion King	$2,892,635	The Mothman Prophecies (#4), Max Keeble's Big Move (#5)
18	May 9, 2002	The Time Machine	$1,757,630	
19	May 16, 2002	The Time Machine	$1,488,021	Queen of the Damned (#5)
20	May 23, 2002	Spider-Man	$12,876,315	The Man Who Wasn't There (#10)
21	May 30, 2002	Spider-Man	$7,441,463	Showtime (#2), 40 Days and 40 Nights (#4), Birthday Girl (#7), Ali (#9)
22	June 6, 2002	Spider-Man	$4,445,649	Panic Room (#2), Frailty (#9)
23	June 13, 2002	Spider-Man	$2,419,189	Unfaithful (#2), Blade II (#4)
24	June 20, 2002	Spider-Man	$1,494,045	The Sum of All Fears (#2), Dragonfly (#4), Don't Tempt Me (#5), Resident Evil (#6)
25	June 27, 2002	The Sum of All Fears	$1,079,852	Insomnia (#4), Murder by Numbers (#7), A Walk to Remember (#8)
26	July 4, 2002	Lilo & Stitch	$3,704,496	
27	July 11, 2002	Star Wars: Episode II – Attack of the Clones	$3,387,551	
29	July 25, 2002	Men in Black II	$3,091,511	Spirit: Stallion of the Cimarron (#2), We Were Soldiers (#3), The Powerpuff Girls Movie (#5)
30	August 1, 2002	Stuart Little 2	$3,577,587	
31	August 8, 2002	Scooby-Doo	$4,612,559	Crossroads (#6), Orange County (#9)
32	August 15, 2002	Scooby-Doo	$2,737,584	Enough (#2), Windtalkers (#3), Snow Dogs (#4), About a Boy (#7)
33	August 22, 2002	El Crimen del Padre Amaro	$5,410,124	Long Time Dead (#3), Eight Legged Freaks (#7)
34	August 29, 2002	El Crimen del Padre Amaro	$4,268,423	Reign of Fire (#2)
35	September 5, 2002	El Crimen del Padre Amaro	$2,539,322	Road to Perdition (#2), K-19: The Widowmaker (#4), Le Pacte des loups (#7), Divine Secrets of the Ya-Ya Sisterhood (#8)
36	September 12, 2002	El Crimen del Padre Amaro	$1,742,899	Mr. Deeds (#2), One Hour Photo (#5)
37	September 19, 2002	Signs	$4,942,272	
38	September 26, 2002	Signs	$2,742,666	Austin Powers in Goldmember (#3), Ciudades Oscuras (#8)
39	October 3, 2002	El Tigre de Santa Julia	$1,758,425	The Sweetest Thing (#3), Changing Lanes (#4), The Country Bears (#10)
40	October 10, 2002	xXx	$2,212,780	Punto y Aparte (#5), Possession (#8),
41	October 17, 2002	xXx	$1,458,316	Bad Company (#3), City by the Sea (#5)
42	October 24, 2002	The Bourne Identity	$1,513,290	The Master of Disguise (#4), Blood Work (#8)
43	October 31, 2002	The Bourne Identity	$974,351	Halloween: Resurrection (#2), Swimfan (#5), Heist (#7)
44	November 7, 2002	Red Dragon	$2,540,122	Spy Kids 2: The Island of Lost Dreams (#2)
45	November 14, 2002	Red Dragon	$1,504,080	Amarte Duele (#2), Blue Crush (#5), Talk to Her (#6)
46	November 21, 2002	Amarte Duele	$1,501,191	Ghost Ship (#2), The Tuxedo (#4)
47	November 28, 2002	Amarte Duele	$1,017,267	
48	December 5, 2002	Harry Potter and the Chamber of Secrets	$5,928,153	Serving Sara (#6)
49	December 12, 2002	Harry Potter and the Chamber of Secrets	$3,316,598	The Ring (#2), The Santa Clause 2 (#3), The Order (#6)
50	December 19, 2002	The Ring	$2,185,615	Die Another Day (#2), Treasure Planet (#4)
51	December 26, 2002	The Lord of the Rings: The Two Towers	$5,896,954	Like Mike (#7), Lucía y el Sexo (#10)

== Highest-grossing films ==
Highest-grossing films of 2002
Rank	Title	Distributor	Gross (USD)
1.	Spider-Man	Sony	$31,196,574
2.	Ice Age	20th Century Fox	$20,585,860
3.	Harry Potter and the Chamber of Secrets	Warner Bros.	$16,954,909
4.	El Crimen del Padre Amaro	Sony	$16,313,914
5.	The Lord of the Rings: The Two Towers	Warner Bros.	$15,998,901
6.	The Ring	DreamWorks Pictures	$12,293,858
7.	Signs	Buena Vista	$11,429,220
8.	Lilo & Stitch	Disney	$11,389,568
9.	Men in Black II	Sony	$11,097,021
10.	Shallow Hal	20th Century Fox	$10,933,825

== See also ==
- List of Mexican films — Mexican films by year
- Lists of box office number-one films

Preceded by 2001	2002	Succeeded by 2003
