= Lake Buena Vista, Florida =

City in Orange County, Florida, US

- City
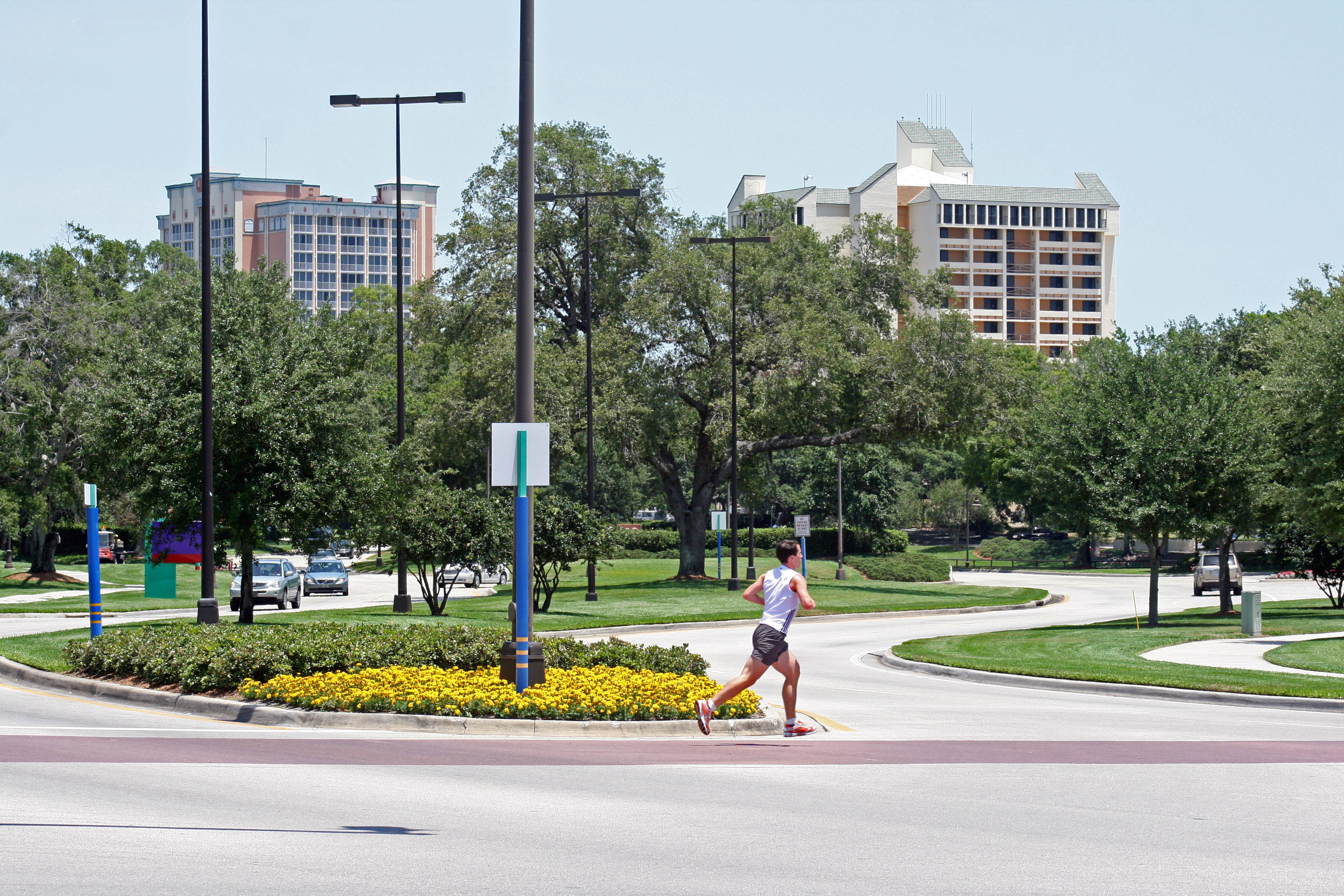
- Hotel Plaza Boulevard

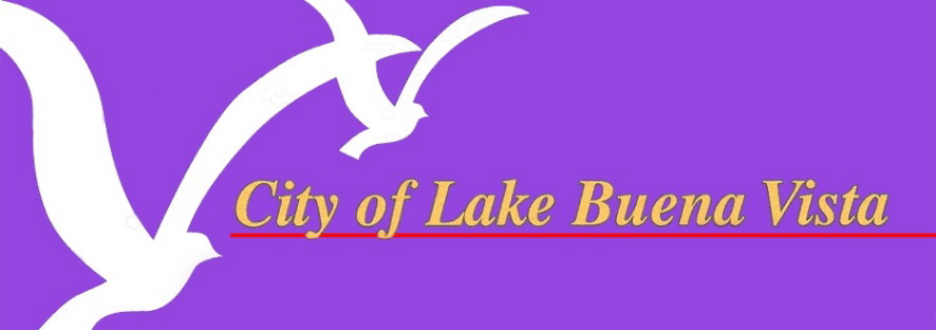
- Seal

- Location in Orange County and the state of Florida

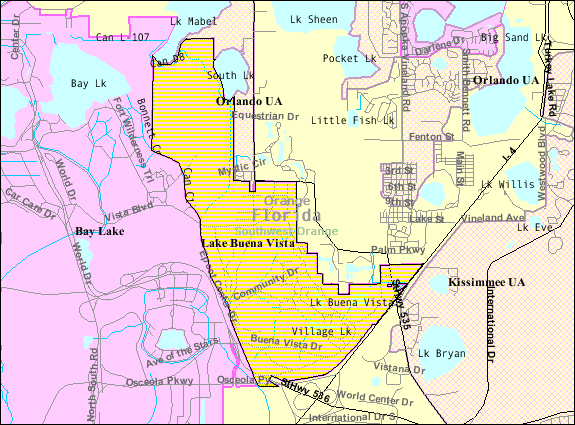
- U.S. Census Map
- Coordinates: 28°22′29″N 81°31′29″W
- Country: United States
- State: Florida
- County: Orange
- Incorporated (City of Reedy Creek): May 12, 1967
- Incorporated (City of Lake Buena Vista): July 3, 1969
- Named for: South Buena Vista Street, the street in Burbank, California where the Disney Studio Lot is located.

Government
  - Type: Council-Manager
  - Mayor: Renee Raper
  - Mayor Pro Tem: Andrea Fay
  - Council Members: Gene King, Angie Sola, and William "Tom" McCoy
  - City Manager: Randy Singh
  - City Clerk: Amy T. Iennaco

Area
  - Total: 3.14 sq mi (8.13 km^{2})
  - Land: 3.03 sq mi (7.84 km^{2})
  - Water: 0.11 sq mi (0.29 km^{2})
- Elevation: 98 ft (30 m)

Population (2020)
  - Total: 24
  - Density: 7.9/sq mi (3.06/km^{2})
- Time zone: UTC-5 (Eastern (EST))
  - Summer (DST): UTC-4 (EDT)
- ZIP code: 32830
- Area codes: 407, 689
- FIPS code: 12-37625
- GNIS feature ID: 2404857
- Website: cityoflakebuenavistafl.gov

Lake Buena Vista (/ˌbwɛnəˈvɪstə/ or /ˌbweɪnəˈvɪstə/) is a city in Orange County, Florida, United States. It is mostly known for being the mailing address for Walt Disney World, although almost all of the resort facilities, including all four theme parks, are physically located in the adjacent city of Bay Lake. It is one of two Florida municipalities inside the Central Florida Tourism Oversight District, which also contains Walt Disney World, the other being Bay Lake. The permanent residential population of Lake Buena Vista was 24 at the 2020 census.

Disney Springs (formerly Downtown Disney) and some hotels are in Lake Buena Vista. Permanent residents of Lake Buena Vista are employees of Disney and those of the district, as well as former employees of either entity who have retired, and members of families of any of those categories.

The city is part of the Orlando–Kissimmee–Sanford Metropolitan Statistical Area, more commonly known as Greater Orlando or the Orlando metropolitan area.

== History ==
Chapter 67-1965 of the Laws of Florida, incorporating the City of Reedy Creek, was signed into law by Governor Claude R. Kirk, Jr. on May 12, 1967, the same day he also signed Chapter 67-764 (creating the Reedy Creek Improvement District), also known as the Reedy Creek Improvement Act, and Chapter 67-1104 (incorporating the city of Bay Lake). It was located fully inside the Reedy Creek Improvement District. The city was controlled by The Walt Disney Company and allowed it powers that other area attractions had not had.

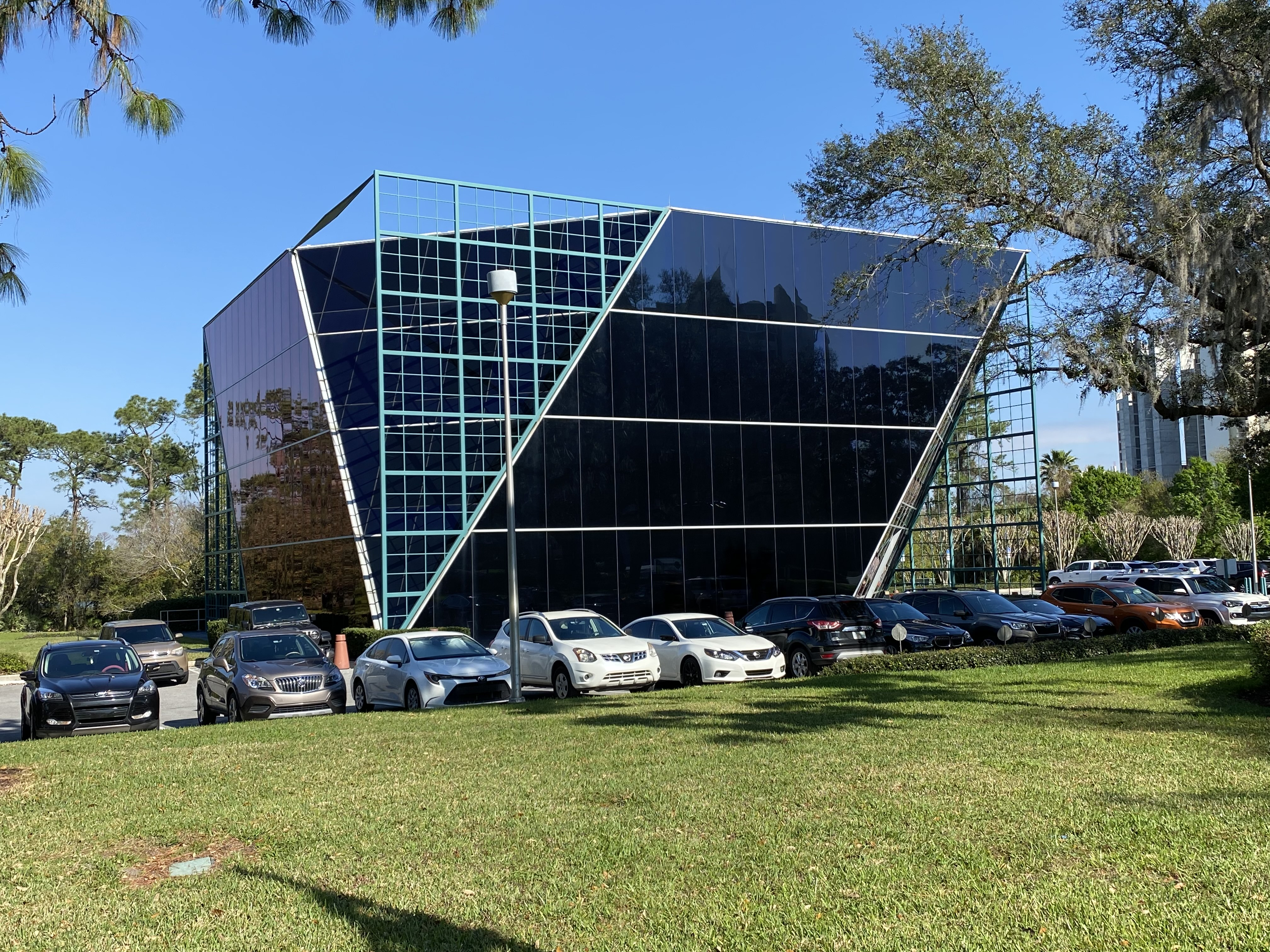
Reedy Creek Improvement District Office in Lake Buena Vista.

Chapter 69-1527, which became law on July 3, 1969, without the governor's approval, redefined the city boundaries. The city was completely moved, taking over some land that had been part of the City of Bay Lake (and was given up by 69-836 of the Laws of Florida, which became a law the same day) and including some other land that had formerly been unincorporated. Soon after, the City of Reedy Creek was renamed to the City of Lake Buena Vista to better reflect its new location, through which Reedy Creek did not flow. "Buena Vista" comes from the name of the street in Burbank, California, where The Walt Disney Company is headquartered.

The Reedy Creek Improvement District had all the powers of the city and more, raising the question of why cities needed to be incorporated inside it. Walt Disney's original plans for the site were to construct a futuristic, fully-functional city; a planned "community of the future". This was never built, but some of the ideas were incorporated into the EPCOT theme park and later Celebration, Florida. The only residents of the city are Disney employees and their immediate family members who live in a small community on Royal Oak Court, north of Disney Springs. From 1971 to 2022, the only landowners are fully owned subsidiaries of Disney, and rights-of-way for state and county roads.

From November 5–6 2005, the 2005 Rubik's Cube World Championship was held at Disney's Pop Century Resort.

On February 27, 2023, the Florida Legislature passed House Bill 9B to supersede the Reedy Creek Improvement Act, replacing the Reedy Creek Improvement District with the Central Florida Tourism Oversight District.

== Geography ==
According to the United States Census Bureau, the city has a total area of 3.1 square miles (8.0 km^{2}), of which 3.0 square miles (7.7 km^{2}) is land and 0.12 square miles (0.3 km^{2}) (4.02%) is water.

In 1987 permanent residents resided in a mobile home park about 1.5 miles (2.4 km) away from Disney Springs. The park is on Little Lake Bryan.

=== Climate ===
The climate in this area is characterized by hot, humid summers and generally mild winters. According to the Köppen climate classification, the City of Lake Buena Vista has a humid subtropical climate zone (Cfa).

Climate data for Lake Buena Vista, FL
Month	Jan	Feb	Mar	Apr	May	Jun	Jul	Aug	Sep	Oct	Nov	Dec	Year
Record high °F (°C)	90 (32)	90 (32)	92 (33)	98 (37)	100 (38)	101 (38)	101 (38)	103 (39)	98 (37)	97 (36)	92 (33)	90 (32)	103 (39)
Mean daily maximum °F (°C)	71 (22)	74 (23)	77 (25)	82 (28)	87 (31)	90 (32)	91 (33)	92 (33)	89 (32)	84 (29)	79 (26)	73 (23)	82 (28)
Mean daily minimum °F (°C)	47 (8)	50 (10)	53 (12)	58 (14)	65 (18)	71 (22)	73 (23)	73 (23)	72 (22)	65 (18)	57 (14)	50 (10)	61 (16)
Record low °F (°C)	19 (−7)	27 (−3)	25 (−4)	38 (3)	45 (7)	50 (10)	56 (13)	60 (16)	56 (13)	42 (6)	29 (−2)	20 (−7)	19 (−7)
Average precipitation inches (mm)	2.39 (61)	2.88 (73)	3.82 (97)	2.27 (58)	3.55 (90)	7.67 (195)	7.47 (190)	7.85 (199)	6.31 (160)	3.24 (82)	2.24 (57)	2.41 (61)	52.1 (1,323)

=== The lake ===
Lake Buena Vista is a small body of water located east of the Buena Vista Golf Course, west of the crossing of State Road 535 and Interstate 4. The lake, which was called "Blake Lake" before its acquisition by Disney, was named for Buena Vista Street in Burbank, California, where Disney's corporate headquarters are located. Several Walt Disney Company business entities had names containing "Buena Vista", a Spanish phrase that means "good view".

In 2015, guide maps for the Disney Springs shopping, dining, and entertainment district started promoting Village Lake, which the district and Disney's Saratoga Springs Resort & Spa borders, as "Lake Buena Vista". The actual lake and the promoted lake are connected via a stream, which is crossed by a bridge linking Disney Springs' Marketplace area with Saratoga Springs Resort.

== Demographics ==
Historical population
Census	Pop.	Note	%±
1970	12		—
1980	98		716.7%
1990	1,776		1,712.2%
2000	16		−99.1%
2010	10		−37.5%
2020	24		140.0%
(Note: The spike in the 1990 population reflects the temporary inclusion of residents of the Vista Way apartments, which began operation in 1988. They were de-annexed after the 1990 census.)

=== 2010 and 2020 census ===
Lake Buena Vista racial composition (Hispanics excluded from racial categories) (NH = Non-Hispanic)
Race	Pop 2010	Pop 2020	% 2010	% 2020
White (NH)	10	15	100.00%	62.50%
Black or African American (NH)	0	0	0.00%	0.00%
Native American or Alaska Native (NH)	0	0	0.00%	0.00%
Asian (NH)	0	0	0.00%	0.00%
Pacific Islander or Native Hawaiian (NH)	0	0	0.00%	0.00%
Some other race (NH)	0	0	0.00%	0.00%
Two or more races/Multiracial (NH)	0	2	0.00%	8.33%
Hispanic or Latino (any race)	0	7	0.00%	29.17%
Total	10	24	100.00%	100.00%

As of the 2020 United States census, there were 24 people, 3 households, and 2 families residing in the city.

As of the 2010 United States census, there were 10 people, 3 households, and 3 families residing in the city.

=== 2000 census ===
As of the census of 2000, there were 16 people, 9 households, and 5 families residing in the city. The population density was 3.3 inhabitants per square mile (1.3/km^{2}). There were 11 housing units at an average density of 2.3 per square mile (0.9/km^{2}). The racial makeup of the city was 100.00% White.

In 2000, there are 9 households out of which 11.1% have children under the age of 18 living with them, 44.4% were married couples living together, 0.0% had a female householder with no husband present, and 44.4% were non-families. 44.4% of all households were made up of individuals and 11.1% had someone living alone who was 65 years of age or older. The average household size was 1.78 and the average family size was 2.40.

In 2000, in the city, the population was spread out with 12.5% under the age of 18, 0.0% from 18 to 24, 18.8% from 25 to 44, 37.5% from 45 to 64, and 31.3% who were 65 years of age or older. The median age was 53 years. For every 100 females there were 100.0 males. For every 100 females age 18 and over, there were 100.0 males.

In 2000, the median income for a household in the city was $39,375, and the median income for a family was $62,500. Males had a median income of $60,000 versus $38,750 for females. The per capita income for the city was $25,769. 0.0% of the population and 0.0% of families were below the poverty line.

== Points of interest ==
- Walt Disney World:
  - Disney Springs
  - Typhoon Lagoon
  - Lake Buena Vista Golf Course

== Government and infrastructure ==
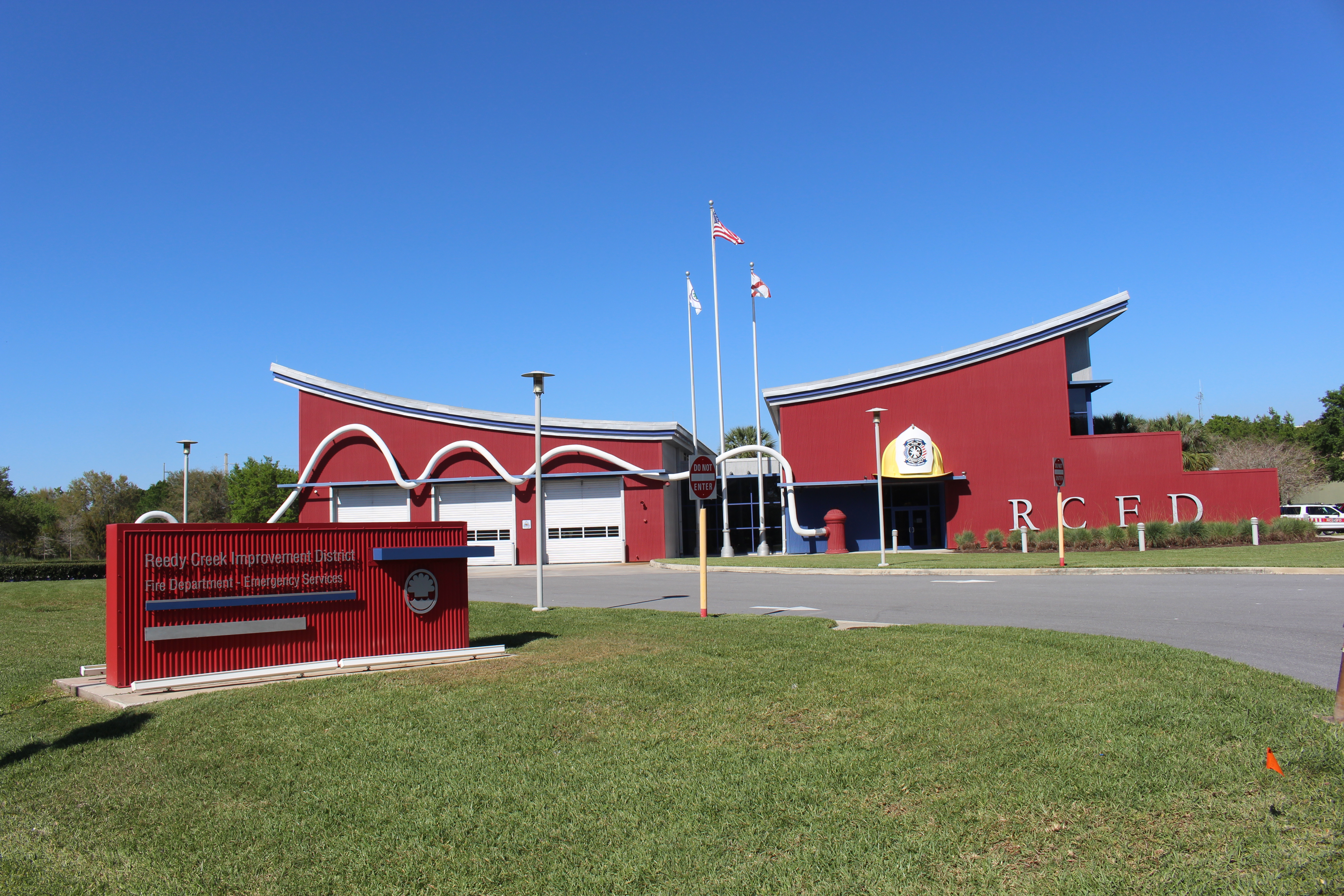
Central Florida Tourism Oversight District Fire Department Emergency Services fire station

The Central Florida Tourism Oversight District has its Fire Department Emergency Services station in Bay Lake, near Lake Buena Vista.

== Education ==
Lake Buena Vista is within Orange County Public Schools.

The only subdivision within Lake Buena Vista (Royal Oak Court) falls within the attendance zones of Sand Lake Elementary School, Southwest Middle School, and Lake Buena Vista High School. Formerly the zoned high school was Dr. Phillips High School.

== See also ==
- Bay Lake, Florida
- Central Florida Tourism Oversight District
