= Walt Disney Archives =

Corporate archive for The Walt Disney Company

Coordinates: 34.1583°N 118.3249°W

- Type: Division
- Founded: June 22, 1970
- Founder: Dave Smith
- Headquarters: Frank G. Wells Building, Walt Disney Studios; 500 South Buena Vista Street, Burbank, California, U.S.
- Key people: Rebecca Cline (director); Michael Vargo (SVP—D23, corporate events, and Walt Disney Archives
- Services: Research, preservation, and museum exhibits related to the history of The Walt Disney Company
- Number of employees: 42
- Parent: The Walt Disney Company
- Website: d23.com/walt-disney-archives/

The Walt Disney Archives is the corporate archive for The Walt Disney Company. Established in 1970 by Dave Smith, the Walt Disney Archives is the official repository for Disney's history, including everything from corporate files to photographs, movie props and costumes, consumer products, and assets from Disney's theme parks. The Archives is also an official source for history of Walt Disney himself and the Disney family and was established "to collect, preserve and make available for research the historical materials relating to Walt and the company he founded."

== History ==
=== Early beginnings ===
In 1967, Dave Smith, a research librarian based at UCLA, began compiling a bibliography on Walt Disney with the official consent and cooperation of Walt Disney Productions (now The Walt Disney Company). Smith spent more than a year researching the bibliography and company officials were impressed with the result.

In October 1969, Walt Disney Productions requested Smith's services as an archival consultant. Company co-founder and brother of Walt Disney, Roy O. Disney, wanted to catalog and preserve his brother's records, awards, and other memorabilia. Smith's first assignment was cataloguing and photographing Walt Disney's studio offices, which had been left relatively untouched since Disney died in December 1966.

Smith completed his work on the Walt Disney offices in December 1969 – cataloguing over 2,200 assets (from office furniture to paper clips) and taking hundreds of pictures. Realizing that it would be impossible to separate the history of Disney the man from his company, Smith wrote out a proposal for the establishment of a corporate archive for the entire organization. After six months of deliberation and meetings with company management, the proposal was accepted by Roy O. Disney and he hired Smith full time on June 22, 1970, as Disney's first archivist. The Walt Disney Archives was the first corporate archive for a major entertainment company.

"Roy [Disney] was greatly interested in the work of the Archives, even asking me to compile the Disney family history for him," Smith said. "I was thrilled to work alongside Roy for two years before his untimely passing in 1971."

Over the next four decades, Smith (and eventually a small team of archivists) collected and catalogued millions of items from the company's past. Originally working alone, Smith scoured the Disney Studio and Disneyland Park to find historic records, materials, and other tangible assets related to the company's history. Employees were initially asked to consult with Smith prior to doing any document destruction or clearing out of materials until Smith established protocols from the company to follow—as employees at first didn't understand the value of preserving certain items.

As such, Smith initially found many important artifacts in strange places. For example, Smith discovered the snow globe of St. Paul's Cathedral used in Mary Poppins (1964) in a dumpster at the studio. Smith was also known to frequent swap meets and antique malls looking for historic Disney material the company didn't yet have samples of.

=== Establishment ===
When the department was established in 1970, the Archives was located in the casting building at the Walt Disney Studio in Burbank, California. In 1976, the Archives moved to the Roy O. Disney Building. The Archives now has its main offices in the Frank G. Wells Building (where it has been since 1997), as well as several warehouses in close proximity used to store many of the Archives' historic assets. As of 2023, the Archives employs 42 people.

Smith retired in 2010 and Rebecca Cline, a longtime Archives employee, succeeded him as Archives director. However, Smith continued as a consultant and was named chief archivist emeritus, as well as a Disney Legend (2007).

In 2015, the Archives led a restoration of Walt Disney's offices on the third floor of the animation building on the Walt Disney Studio lot. All the materials and assets Dave Smith catalogued in 1969 were placed back in their original space in Suite 3H. The offices are open as a permanent exhibit for Disney employees and studio guests, as well as a stop on the official D23-sponsored tours of the Disney Studio.

in 2022, the Archives announced a restoration of Walt Disney's Grumman private plane (N234MM, "The Mouse"). The exterior was finished first and the plane was displayed at the 2022 D23 Expo event in Anaheim, California. The plane is now on an extended loan to the Palm Springs Air Museum, where it is currently on public display. The museum is currently working to restore the plane's interior.

=== Expansion ===
As other studios and companies have been acquired by Disney, the Archives may take possession of the acquired company's archival assets, if any exist. In 2019, for example, 20th Century Fox was brought into Disney, and the Archives assimilated the assets and personnel from the Fox Archive, including more than 20 million photos compared to 5 million photos already owned by Disney. However, entities like Lucasfilm and Pixar still maintain their own archival collections at their respective facilities. And some homegrown Disney divisions like Walt Disney Animation Studios and Walt Disney Imagineering also keep their own archival research libraries (mainly for historic art assets like concept art and animation drawings), but partner with the Walt Disney Archives on projects.

== Exhibits ==
Under Bob Iger as the CEO of The Walt Disney Company, the Archives has taken a more public-facing role. The Archives have developed or collaborated on building the following exhibits for the public:

- A Great Big Beautiful Car Show – showcases a collection of vehicles from Disney brands
- Disney100: The Exhibition – showcases a century of Disney through immersive experiences, interactive displays, and historical artifacts divided into ten galleries
- Heros & Villains: The Art of the Disney Costume – in collaboration with Museum of Pop Culture, this exhibit showcases characters through their costume design, featuring more than 70 original pieces
- Inside the Walt Disney Archives: 50 Years of Preserving the Magic – a large-scale retrospective at several aspects of Disney history, which features 465 items seldom displayed from the archives
- Treasures of The Walt Disney Archives – largest exhibition by the Archives, featuring more than 500 artifacts (models, props, costumes, set pieces, and artwork) from throughout Disney history
- Walt Disney — A Magical Life – showcases the story of Walt Disney's life using remastered footage and audio recordings
- Walt's Dream of Disneyland – in collaboration with Walt Disney Imagineering, this showcases the evolution of Disneyland from its early stages of development
