= Buena Vista Street (Burbank, California) =

Street in Burbank, California, United States

- Maintained by: Bureau of Street Services, City of Burbank
- Length: 4.0 mi (6.4 km)
- South end: SR 134 / Riverside Drive in Burbank
- Major junctions: I-5 in Burbank
- North end: Scott Road in Burbank

Buena Vista Street (from Spanish for 'Good View') is a major street in Burbank, California. It runs north–south from its north end at Scott Road to its south end at Riverside Drive and the 134 freeway. The street has interchanges with both the 134 freeway and Interstate 5.

Walt Disney Studios have long been located on Buena Vista Street. As such, the street gives its name to a company brand, a town and lake at Walt Disney World Resort, and a land at Disney's California Adventure.

The intersection of Buena Vista and Vanowen Streets has been prone to collisions and accidents due to speeding. A steel railing was installed in 2016.
