= Disney A to Z =

Official Disney encyclopedia

Disney A to Z: The Official Encyclopedia
- Updated edition cover
- Author: Dave Smith
- Language: English
- Publisher: Hyperion
- Publication date: 1996
- Publication place: United States

Disney A to Z: The Official Encyclopedia is the official encyclopedia of The Walt Disney Company. It was written by Disney's head archivist, Dave Smith.

It has over five hundred pages of entries, hundreds of photographs, and provides coverage of the history of Disney, park attractions, television shows, songs, animated features and shorts, and films. It also includes details of Disney company personnel and primary actors.

== Editions ==
- Disney A to Z: The Official Encyclopedia. 1st ed. New York: Hyperion, 1996. ISBN 0-7868-6223-8.
- Disney A to Z: The Updated Official Encyclopedia. Updated ed. New York: Hyperion, 1998. ISBN 0-7868-6391-9.
- Disney A to Z: The Official Encyclopedia. 3rd ed. New York: Disney Editions, 2006. ISBN 0-7868-4919-3.
- Disney A to Z: The Official Encyclopedia. 4th ed. New York: Disney Editions, 2015. ISBN 1-4847-2133-0.
- Disney A to Z: The Official Encyclopedia. 5th ed. Disney Editions, 2016 ISBN 1-4847-3783-0.
- Disney A to Z: The Official Encyclopedia. 6th ed. Disney Editions Deluxe, 2023 ISBN 1-3680-6191-5.
