= List of 2004 box office number-one films in Mexico =

This is a list of films which placed number one at the weekend box office for the year 2004.

== Number-one films ==
#	Date	Film	Gross (USD)	Openings in the top ten
1	January 8, 2004	Brother Bear	$2,234,015	Cheaper by the Dozen (#3), Timeline (#6)
2	January 15, 2004	Brother Bear	$1,417,897	In the Cut (#6)
3	January 22, 2004	The Last Samurai	$2,941,964	Uptown Girls (#6)
4	January 29, 2004	The Last Samurai	$2,075,335	The Rundown (#2), Lost in Translation (#9)
5	February 5, 2004	The Haunted Mansion	$3,141,930	Something's Gotta Give (#3), Paycheck (#4)
6	February 12, 2004	The Haunted Mansion	$1,647,350	Master and Commander: The Far Side of the World (#2)
7	February 19, 2004	The Haunted Mansion	$1,450,688	House of the Dead (#6)
8	February 26, 2004	Gothika	$1,256,764	Cold Mountain (#3), Good Boy! (#6), School of Rock (#7)
9	March 4, 2004	Gothika	$1,244,546	Big Fish (#8)
10	March 11, 2004	Along Came Polly	$1,228,812	Sexo con Amor (#7)
11	March 18, 2004	Scary Movie 3	$2,264,480	Monster (#4), The Last Temptation of Christ (#7)
12	March 25, 2004	The Passion of the Christ	$7,877,513	Cold Creek Manor (#6)
13	April 1, 2004	The Passion of the Christ	$4,557,112	
14	April 8, 2004	Scooby-Doo 2: Monsters Unleashed	$3,870,404	Dawn of the Dead (#4)
15	April 15, 2004	Scooby-Doo 2: Monsters Unleashed	$2,281,970	
16	April 22, 2004	50 First Dates	$1,003,294	Starsky & Hutch (#3), Taking Lives (#4), The Girl Next Door (#6), Twisted (#8)
17	April 29, 2004	Secret Window	$968,923	
18	May 6, 2004	Zapata: El sueño de un héroe	$1,909,420	Hidalgo (#2), El Cid: La leyenda (#10)
19	May 13, 2004	Van Helsing	$3,123,133	
20	May 20, 2004	Troy	$5,620,021	The Human Stain (#5)
21	May 27, 2004	Troy	$4,077,039	Kill Bill: Volume 2 (#3), The Prince and Me (#4)
22	June 3, 2004	The Day After Tomorrow	$7,956,951	Décalage Horaire (#9), Girl with a Pearl Earring (#10)
23	June 10, 2004	Harry Potter and the Prisoner of Azkaban	$7,391,093	The Ladykillers (#4)
24	June 17, 2004	Harry Potter and the Prisoner of Azkaban	$3,785,069	The Punisher (#3), 7 mujeres, 1 homosexual y Carlos (#5)
25	June 24, 2004	Shrek 2	$10,882,587	
26	July 1, 2004	Shrek 2	$6,880,100	Mean Girls (#4), Godsend (#5)
27	July 8, 2004	Spider-Man 2	$10,430,232	
28	July 15, 2004	Spider-Man 2	$5,309,547	The Stepford Wives (#3), The Butterfly Effect (#4), Raising Helen (#5), House of 1000 Corpses (#10)
29	July 22, 2004	Garfield: The Movie	$3,874,504	Matando Cabos (#3), The Chronicles of Riddick (#5), My Boss's Daughter (#9)
30	July 29, 2004	Home on the Range	$2,104,241	Hellboy (#4), New York Minute (#6), Eternal Sunshine of the Spotless Mind (#10)
31	August 5, 2004	I, Robot	$3,193,515	Around the World in 80 Days (#7)
32	August 12, 2004	A Day Without a Mexican	$2,676,484	King Arthur (#2), 13 Going on 30 (#6), Thunderbirds (#8), The Whole Ten Yards (#9)
33	August 19, 2004	Catwoman	$1,579,914	Man on Fire (#4)
34	August 26, 2004	Collateral	$1,783,629	Yu-Gi-Oh! The Movie: Pyramid of Light (#6)
35	September 2, 2004	Anacondas: The Hunt for the Blood Orchid	$1,716,689	DodgeBall: A True Underdog Story (#5), Darkness (#7), The Notebook (#10)
36	September 9, 2004	The Bourne Supremacy	$1,386,529	
37	September 16, 2004	Alien vs. Predator	$2,122,889	Fahrenheit 9/11 (#2)
38	September 23, 2004	The Village	$3,147,273	A Cinderella Story (#2), La Mala Educación (#4)
39	September 30, 2004	Resident Evil: Apocalypse	$1,874,330	The Terminal (#3), Padre Nuestro (#9)
40	October 7, 2004	Resident Evil: Apocalypse	$1,099,644	White Chicks (#2), The Manchurian Candidate (#5), Conejo en la luna (#8)
41	October 14, 2004	Shark Tale	$3,497,886	The Motorcycle Diaries (#2)
42	October 21, 2004	Shark Tale	$2,336,888	Open Water (#4)
43	October 28, 2007	The Forgotten	$1,617,961	Desnudos (#9)
44	November 4, 2004	Exorcist: The Beginning	$1,849,136	The Clearing (#8), Wimbledon (#10)
45	November 11, 2004	Exorcist: The Beginning	$892,473	Alfie (#4), Wicker Park (#10)
46	November 18, 2004	Shall We Dance?	$840,516	Surviving Christmas (#3), Sky Captain and the World of Tomorrow (#6)
47	November 25, 2004	The Princess Diaries 2: Royal Engagement	$952,270	Cellular (#3), Criminal (#7), Out of Time (#9)
48	December 2, 2004	The Polar Express	$1,866,695	Bridget Jones: The Edge of Reason (#4), Santos Peregrinos (#5), Hero (#7)
49	December 9, 2004	Alexander	$2,094,715	The SpongeBob SquarePants Movie (#3), Ladder 49 (#4)
50	December 16, 2004	Alexander	$1,304,306	Christmas with the Kranks (#4), Cero Y Van Cuatro (#5), Dirty Dancing: Havana Nights (#8)
51	December 23, 2004	The Incredibles	$6,060,797	
52	December 30, 2004	The Incredibles	$4,408,539	Suspect Zero (#10)

== Highest-grossing films ==
Highest-grossing films of 2004
Rank	Title	Distributor	Gross (USD)
1.	Shrek 2	Universal	$27,636,511
2.	Spider-Man 2	Sony	$20,582,311
3.	The Day After Tomorrow	20th Century Fox	$19,014,036
4.	The Passion of the Christ	20th Century Fox	$18,880,455
5.	The Incredibles	Disney	$16,019,958
6.	Troy	Warner Bros.	$15,024,128
7.	Harry Potter and the Prisoner of Azkaban	Warner Bros.	$14,635,326
8.	Shark Tale	Universal	$9,340,045
9.	Scooby-Doo 2: Monsters Unleashed	Warner Bros.	$9,149,902
10.	The Last Samurai	Warner Bros.	$8,772,452

Preceded by 2003	2004	Succeeded by 2005
