= List of 2001 box office number-one films in Mexico =

This is a list of films which placed number one at the weekley box office in Mexico for the year 2001.

== Number-one films ==
#	Date	Film	Gross (USD)	Openings in the top ten
1	January 4, 2001	Chicken Run	$1,360,593	
2	January 11, 2001	Men of Honor	$1,286,344	
3	January 18, 2001	Vertical Limit	$3,176,799	
4	January 25, 2001	Vertical Limit	$2,585,888	
5	February 1, 2001	Cast Away	$2,295,378	
6	February 8, 2001	What Women Want	$3,131,535	
7	February 15, 2001	What Women Want	$1,810,839	
8	February 22, 2001	What Women Want	$1,157,982	
9	March 1, 2001	Hannibal	$2,708,484	
10	March 8, 2001	Hannibal	$1,650,118	
11	March 15, 2001	The Exorcist (reissue)	$3,386,104	
12	March 22, 2001	The Exorcist (reissue)	$2,402,671	
13	March 29, 2001	Traffic	$1,193,813	Traffic reached number one in its second week of release
14	April 5, 2001	Dungeons & Dragons	$729,161	
15	April 12, 2001	The Emperor's New Groove	$2,422,847	
16	April 19, 2001	The Mexican	$1,959,003	
17	April 26, 2001	Miss Congeniality	$1,874,194	
18	May 3, 2001	Miss Congeniality	$1,817,968	
19	May 10, 2001	Miss Congeniality	$1,016,760	
20	May 17, 2001	El segundo aire	$1,239,092	
21	May 24, 2001	Dracula 2000	$708,195	Dracula 2000 reached number one in its second week of release
22	May 31, 2001	The Mummy Returns	$4,400,119	
23	June 7, 2001	The Mummy Returns	$3,131,086	
24	June 14, 2001	Y tu mamá también	$2,200,000	
25	June 21, 2001	Pearl Harbor	$3,903,926	
26	June 28, 2001	Pearl Harbor	$2,650,591	
27	July 7, 2001	Shrek	$3,732,149	
28	July 12, 2001	Atlantis: The Lost Empire	$3,261,822	
29	July 19, 2001	Atlantis: The Lost Empire	$2,373,381	
30	July 26, 2001	Jurassic Park III	$4,800,800	
31	August 2, 2001	Jurassic Park III	$3,214,259	
32	August 9, 2001	Planet of the Apes	$4,634,960	
33	August 16, 2001	Planet of the Apes	TBD	
34	August 23, 2001	Cats & Dogs	$2,407,962	
35	August 30, 2001	Cats & Dogs	$1,672,820	
36	September 6, 2001	Swordfish	$1,325,552	
37	September 13, 2001	The Fast and the Furious	$1,169,066	
38	September 20, 2001	A Knight's Tale	$1,379,665	
39	October 27, 2001	A Knight's Tale	$1,174,616	
40	October 4, 2001	Scary Movie 2	$1,466,166	
41	October 11, 2001	Scary Movie 2	TBD	
42	October 18, 2001	America's Sweethearts	TBD	
43	October 25, 2001	The Princess Diaries	$1,300,000	
44	November 1, 2001	The Devil's Backbone	$1,100,000	
45	November 8, 2001	The Others	$3,038,736	
46	November 15, 2001	The Others	TBD	
47	November 22, 2001	The Others	TBD	
48	November 29, 2001	The Others	TBD	
49	December 6, 2001	Harry Potter and the Philosopher's Stone	$4,800,000	Harry Potter and the Philosopher's Stone set the record for the biggest December opening
50	December 13, 2001	Harry Potter and the Philosopher's Stone	TBD	
51	December 20, 2001	Monsters, Inc.	$5,163,388	Monsters, Inc. set a record opening for an animated film
52	December 27, 2001	The Lord of the Rings: The Fellowship of the Ring	$4,829,284	
53	January 3, 2002	Monsters, Inc.	$4,346,758	Monsters, Inc. returned to number one in its third week of release

== See also ==
- List of Mexican films — Mexican films by year
- Lists of box office number-one films

2001	Succeeded by 2002
