= Buena Vista (brand) =

Brand name historically used for divisions of the Walt Disney Company

- Current owner: The Walt Disney Company
- Country: United States
- Introduced: 1953; 73 years ago
- Discontinued: 2009; 17 years ago (as a trade name)
- Markets: United States; Asia Pacific
- Registered as a trademark in: United States

Buena Vista (Spanish for "good view") is a brand name that has historically been used for divisions, subsidiaries, and assets of The Walt Disney Company, whose primary studios, The Walt Disney Studios, are located on South Buena Vista Street in Burbank, California. The studio lot is also home to the company's corporate headquarters, the Team Disney Burbank building. The logos for the various Buena Vista brands featured the "Buena Vista" word mark superimposed over the traditional Disney castle logo to signal the affiliation between Buena Vista and The Walt Disney Company.

== History ==
The brand was originally used for the Buena Vista Film Distribution Company, which had been established by Walt and Roy O. Disney to distribute The Living Desert (1953) after RKO Radio Pictures, The Walt Disney Company's longtime distributor, refused to. The company would go on to distribute all of Disney's future films, though some were still distributed by RKO until 1956 because of preexisting contracts. The Walt Disney Company semi-retired the Buena Vista name in May 2007 and the company was renamed to Walt Disney Studios Motion Pictures.

Portions of the Walt Disney World Resort are located in the city of Lake Buena Vista, Florida. The city's namesake lake was known as Black Lake before The Walt Disney Company acquired the land in the 1960s. The entrance area and themed land of Buena Vista Street at Disney California Adventure at the Disneyland Resort also makes reference to the brand and real-life street in Burbank.

In 1994, the first Spanish-language production emerged from Buena Vista Productions International, "Navidad en las Americas", a holiday program that aired on the Univision network.

In 1996, Buena Vista International was described as the "international distribution division of The Walt Disney Company", including "marketing and distribution" of films in the United Kingdom (as of 1995), and Japan (as of 2005).

== Reorganization ==
The following Buena Vista brands have been semi-retired, fully-retired, or renamed to a The Walt Disney Company and/or ABC name, in accordance with the company's branding strategy. Buena Vista Home Entertainment, Buena Vista Records, and Lake Buena Vista, however, have not legally changed their names. Gaumont Buena Vista International, however, was a joint venture between Gaumont and The Walt Disney Company, established in January 1993. GBVI ensured the distribution of films of its two parent companies in France. After 11 years of existence, it was dissolved in 2004 as The Walt Disney Company prefers to distribute its own films as Buena Vista International. Buena Vista was revived as a name, Buena Vista Theatrical, for the former Fox Stage Productions as a Disney Theatrical Group division.

Buena Vista Brand	Corporate function	Re-branding
Buena Vista Pictures Distribution (BVPD)	Motion picture distributor in the United States	Walt Disney Studios Motion Pictures
Buena Vista International (Note: Retained "Buena Vista" as its legal name.) (BVI)	International distribution arm of Buena Vista Pictures Distribution. Name is still in use in some countries	Walt Disney Studios Motion Pictures International; Buena Vista International (remains in use as a label for non-Disney and non-Star Studio18 theatrical movies in countries outside the United States)
Buena Vista Studios Entertainment (BVSE); Buena Vista Studios International (BVSI)	Formerly Saban Entertainment. After the acquisition, it was regrouped within the BVI brand. It continued to produce animation and live action productions with its semi-affiliated subsidiary SIP Animation until 2009.	Remains in use as a legal entity.
Buena Vista International Latin America (BVILA); Buena Vista International Brazil (BVIB)	Latin American and Brazilian distribution branch of Walt Disney Studios Motion Pictures.	Star Distribution
Buena Vista Original Productions	Latin American and Brazilian film and television production company of Walt Disney Studios Motion Pictures and The Walt Disney Company Latin America.	Star Original Productions
Buena Vista Home Entertainment (BVHE)	Home video distribution arm of Buena Vista Pictures Distribution and The Walt Disney Company's home video distribution unit.	Walt Disney Studios Home Entertainment
Buena Vista International Television (BVIT)	The international television distribution in countries and channels of The Walt Disney Company	Disney–ABC International Television (May 14, 2007)
Buena Vista International Television Latin America (BVITLA)		Disney Media Distribution Latin America (DMDLA)
Buena Vista Worldwide Television (BVWT)		Disney–ABC Worldwide Television (May 14, 2007)
Buena Vista International Television Asia Pacific (BVITAP)		Disney Networks Group Asia Pacific (formerly Disney–ABC International Television Asia Pacific from May 14, 2007 to March 20, 2019 before merging with Fox Networks Group Asia Pacific Limited)
Buena Vista Games (BVG)	Software company	Disney Interactive Studios
Buena Vista Music Group (BVMG)	Disney's music division arm	Disney Music Group
Buena Vista Concerts	Live concert	Disney Concerts
Buena Vista Productions (BVP)		ABC Media Productions (2009)
Buena Vista Publishing Group (BVPG)		Disney Publishing Worldwide (1999)
Buena Vista Sound Studios (BVSS)	Disney's sound department	Disney Digital Studio Services Sound Department
Buena Vista Television (BVT)	Disney's television syndication unit	Disney–ABC Domestic Television
Buena Vista Theatrical Group Ltd. (BVTG)	Disney's stage play and musical production subsidiary	Disney Theatrical Group
