= The Manuscript Society =

The Manuscript Society is an international organization that promotes the collection, preservation, and use of autographs, manuscripts, and historical documents. It was founded in Chicago, Illinois in 1948 as the National Society of Autograph Collectors. It publishes the journal Manuscripts and the newsletter Manuscript Society News. Its archives are held in the collection of the Georgetown University Library. Librarian, archivist, and historian Elizabeth H. Dow described the organization as the "oldest and best known organization for manuscript collectors and dealers" in the United States. The Manuscript Society (TMS) held its first meeting in Chicago on January 3, 1948 at the University Club of Chicago. TMS's Scholarship Committee provides grants and other assistance to scholars wanting to use manuscripts for research.

TMS has had an adversarial relationship with the Society of American Archivists (SAA). Dow stated that the SAA viewed The Manuscript Society as "the enemy in their efforts to retrieve alienated documents". TMS's Replevin Committee provides support to its members defending themselves against a replevin action.
