= Walt Disney Studios (Burbank) =

Corporate headquarters

The Walt Disney Studios

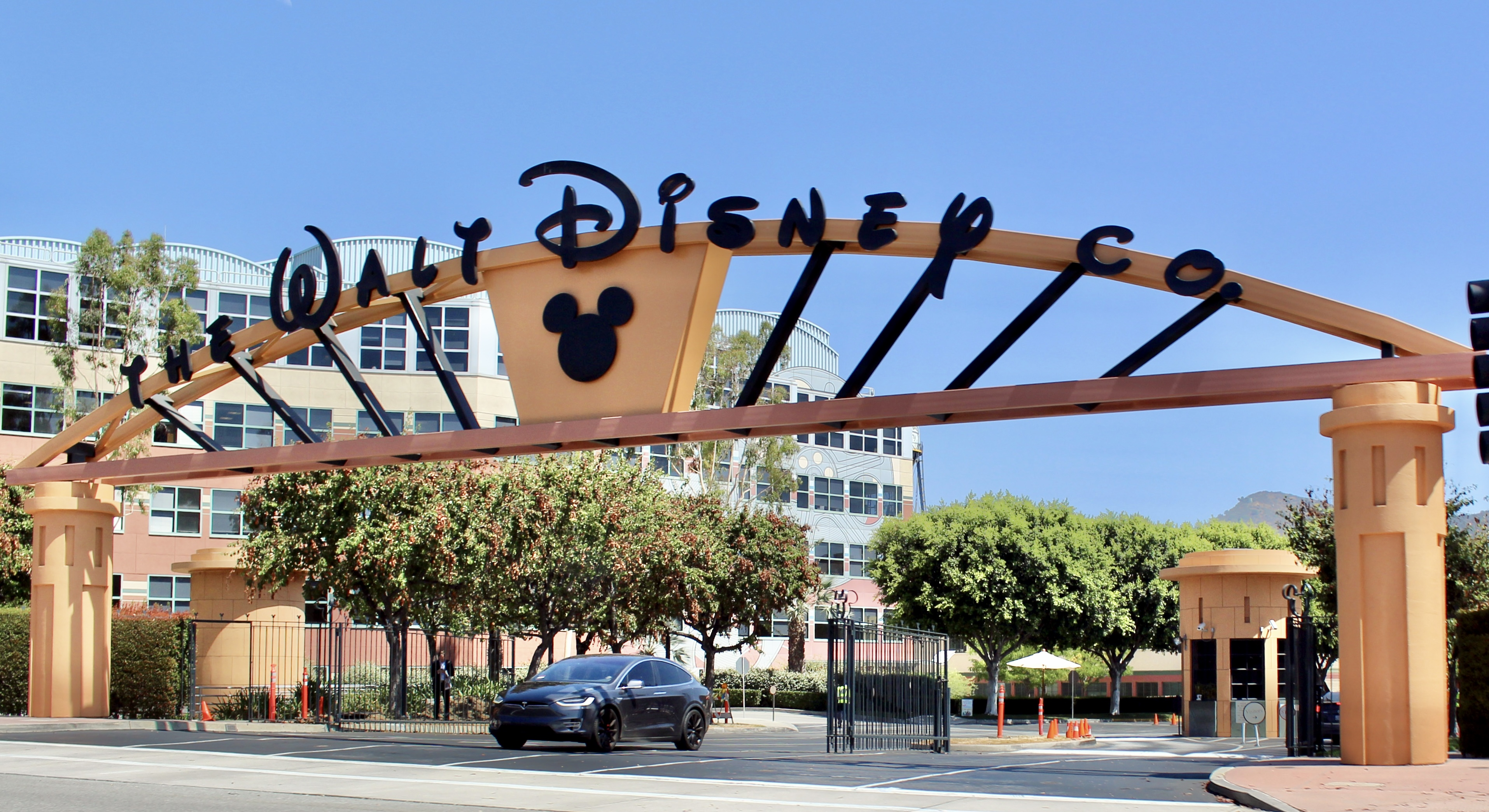
- Main entrance to The Walt Disney Studios on W. Alameda Ave.

General information
- Type: Film and television complex
- Location: 500 South Buena Vista Street; Burbank, California; 91521
- Coordinates: 34°09′25″N 118°19′30″W
- Current tenants: Walt Disney Studios; Walt Disney Pictures; 20th Century Studios; ABC
- Inaugurated: February 23, 1940; 86 years ago
- Owner: Disney Worldwide Services (The Walt Disney Company)

Design and construction
- Developer: Walt Disney; Roy O. Disney

Website
- Official website

The Walt Disney Studios, located in Burbank, California, United States, serves as the global corporate headquarters for the Walt Disney Company. The 51-acre (20.6 ha) studio lot also contains several sound stages, a backlot, and other filmmaking production facilities for the Walt Disney Studios's motion picture production. The complex also houses the offices for many of the company's units, including the film and TV studios Walt Disney Pictures, Walt Disney Animation Studios, ABC, Disney Channel, Freeform, Marvel Studios, 20th Century Studios, 20th Television, Searchlight Pictures, 20th Television Animation and FX Networks, although Marvel Comics will be relocated to the Disney campus in Burbank from New York.

Walt Disney used the earnings from the successful release of Snow White and the Seven Dwarfs to finance the construction of the Burbank studio. Designed by industrial architect Kem Weber in the Streamline Moderne style, the lot opened in early 1940. It was uniquely functional, featuring a central "double-H" Animation Building with eight wings to maximize natural light for artists. In the 1950s, the studio added massive soundstages. Stage 2 (1949) was built in partnership with Jack Webb (Dragnet), and Stage 3 (1953) was specifically designed with a deep water tank for 20,000 Leagues Under the Sea. As of early 2026, Disney has completed the relocation of employees from the former Fox lot in Century City to the main Burbank campus following the expiration of their lease.

The Studio's production services are managed by the Walt Disney Studios's Disney Studio Services unit – along with Golden Oak Ranch, The Prospect Studios, and KABC-7 Studio B. Disney has a secondary location at Grand Central Creative Campus, where Walt Disney Imagineering and some other units are located. Disney Imagineering manages the studio.

== Background ==
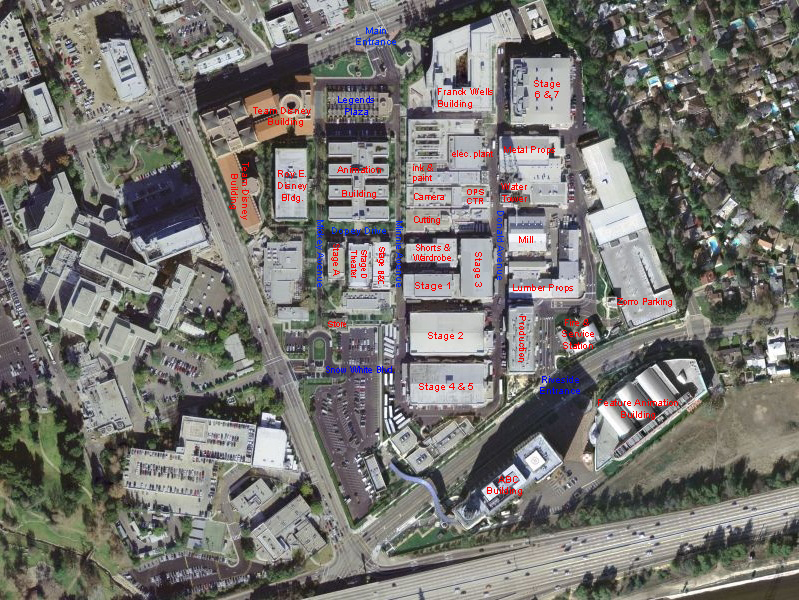
The Walt Disney Studios in an aerial photo from 1999

Prior to the official opening of the Burbank lot in 1940, the Walt Disney Studios was situated at several different locations in Los Angeles. During summer 1923, Walt Disney created "The Disney Bros. Cartoon Studio" in his uncle Robert Disney's garage, which was located at 4406 Kingswell Avenue, in the Los Feliz neighborhood of Los Angeles (just east of Hollywood). This garage has been on display at the Stanley Ranch Museum in Garden Grove since the 1980s, several blocks away from Disneyland. His brother Roy O. Disney was also in Los Angeles at the time. In October 1923, the brothers leased office space on the rear side of a real estate agency's office at 4651 Kingswell Avenue. On October 16, 1923, Walt Disney accepted an offer from Margaret Winkler of Universal Studios to distribute the new Alice Comedies starring Virginia Davis. It was also at this site where on January 14, 1924, Walt Disney met his future wife Lillian Bounds, an "ink and paint" girl whom he personally hired. In February 1924, the studio moved next door to an office of its own at 4649 Kingswell Avenue. The late Robert Disney's residence and the small office building that is home to 4649 and 4651 Kingswell Avenue have survived to the present and are still in use.

In 1925, Walt Disney placed a deposit on a new, considerably larger lot at 2719 Hyperion Avenue, and the studio moved there in January 1926. It was here where, after a train journey with his wife Lillian, Walt created the character of Mickey Mouse in 1928. Here, too, the first three-strip Technicolor animated film, the Silly Symphony Flowers and Trees, and the first animated cartoon using Disney's multiplane camera, The Old Mill, were created. In 1937, the Hyperion studio produced Disney's first full-length animated feature film, Snow White and the Seven Dwarfs. Disney's staff began to grow to a substantial size at the Hyperion Studio, and Disney Legends such as Disney's Nine Old Men began their careers there. The Hyperion studio site was sold in 1940 and divided between two different industrial manufacturers, and in 1966 a subsequent owner demolished what was left of the studio complex and replaced it with the supermarket and shopping center that stand there today. To honor the company's former headquarters from 1926 to 1940, the name 'Hyperion' has been reused over the years by the Walt Disney Company for multiple divisions and attractions, including Hyperion Books and the Hyperion Theater at Disney California Adventure.

== History ==
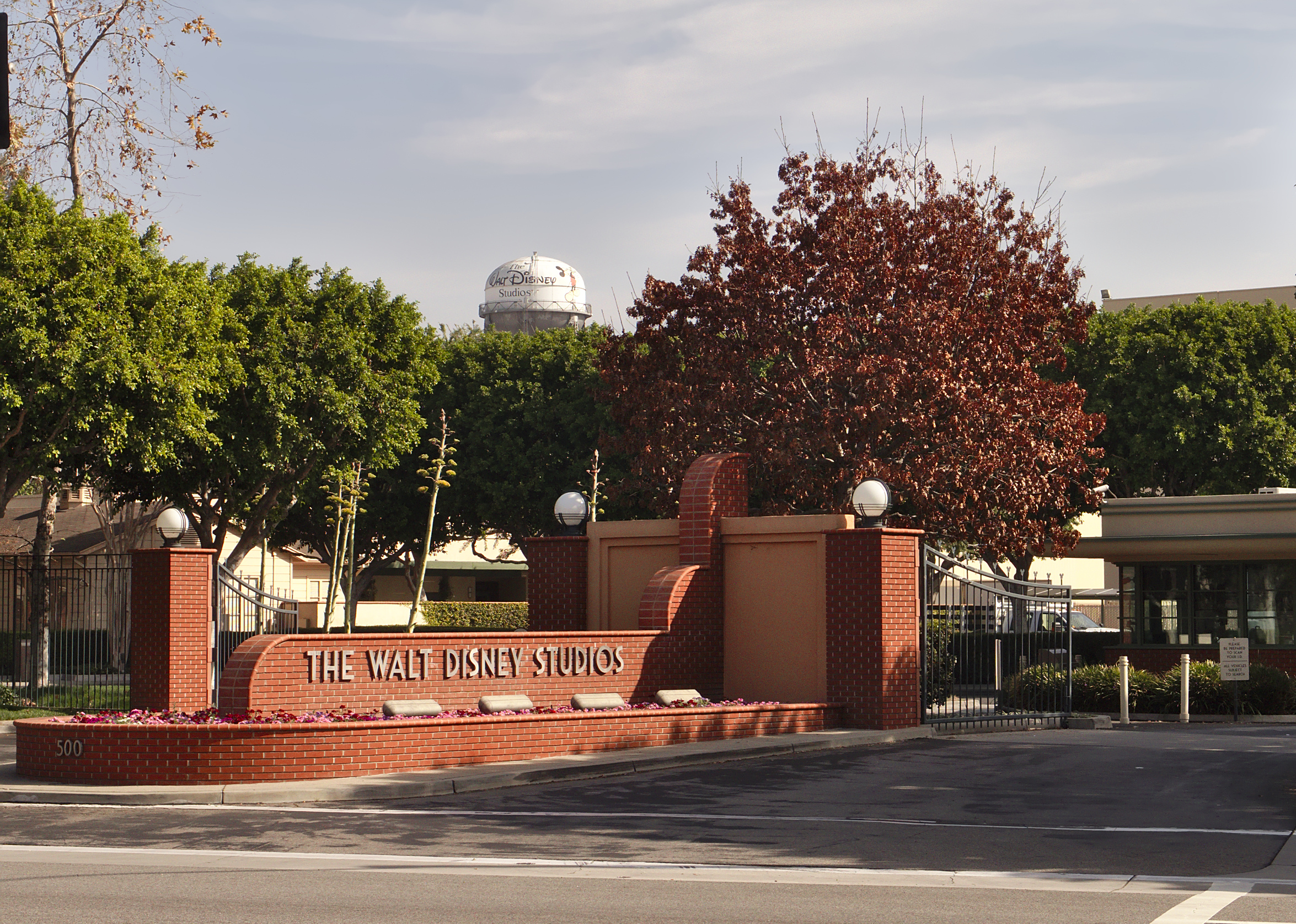
The original entrance gate to Walt Disney Studios at 500 South Buena Vista Street in Burbank, California.

The current Walt Disney Studios, located at 500 South Buena Vista Street, Burbank, was made possible by the revenue from the 1937 release of Snow White and the Seven Dwarfs. Walt Disney and his staff began the move from the old studio at Hyperion Avenue in Silver Lake from December 1939 to January 1940. A bungalow, the Shorts building and other small buildings that were located at the Hyperion Avenue location were moved to Burbank.

Disney purposely planned his new Burbank studio around the animation process. The large Animation Building stood in the center of the campus, while adjacent outlying buildings were constructed for the ink-and-paint departments, the camera and editing departments, and the other various functions of the studio. Tunnels linked some of the buildings (to allow movement of animation materials without exposing them to the outside elements), and the lot also included a movie theatre, a sound stage, and a commissary. The 1941 Disney feature The Reluctant Dragon, which combined live action with animated sequences and starred Robert Benchley, served as a tour of the then-new studio. It was later frequently seen and toured on various Disney television programs.

The attack on Pearl Harbor by Imperial Japan on December 7, 1941, brought America into World War II. 500 United States Army soldiers of the 121st Anti-Aircraft Artillery (AAA) Gun Battalion occupied Walt Disney Studios the day after the attack for eight months in the period of the West Coast invasion scare, making Disney as the only Hollywood studio to come under military occupation in history. During the war, Disney regularly produced propaganda and training films for the U.S. government including its armed forces to increase morale among Americans that the fight against the Axis powers was waged for a just cause.

In the years after the war, the studio began regular work on live-action features, as they needed the money. Though their first films were shot in England, the necessity to build live-action facilities still arose. Lacking the capital to do it themselves, Jack Webb offered to put up some of the money to build live-action soundstages in exchange for the right to use them (Webb used them to shoot much of the Dragnet TV series). During this time, backlots for exterior shots were also built and remained standing at the studios until after a major change in management in 1984.

In 1986, after the corporate restructuring of Walt Disney Productions into the Walt Disney Company, the studio lot was remodeled to accommodate more live-action production space and administrative offices. The studio lot is now home to multiple offices and administration buildings and seven soundstages. It is bounded by South Buena Vista Street on the west, West Alameda Street on the north, South Keystone Street on the east, and West Riverside Drive on the south. It sits in an area of Burbank where the street grid is offset at a diagonal, but most of the original buildings and roads within the campus itself were laid out in alignment with the cardinal directions.

Disney chairman Michael Eisner had the Team Disney building constructed in 1990. In 1992, Disney had gained city approval for its expansion master plan, which included the Riverside Building. The Riverside Building, located next to Feature Animation Building at 2300 Riverside Drive, opened in 2000 for ABC executives and employees.

In April 2013, Marvel Studios moved its offices from Manhattan Beach Studios Media Campus to the studio's Frank G. Wells Building second floor.

In March 2019, Disney acquired most of the entertainment assets of 21st Century Fox but did not acquire its studio lot in Century City. Instead, Disney signed a seven-year lease which allowed most Fox film and television employees to continue to work at the Fox Studios lot.

In April 2025, the Los Angeles Times reported that Disney had finally begun the process of vacating the Fox Studios lot in Century City and relocating all employees still based there to its main studio lot in Burbank. Disney left Century City at the end of 2025 and the lease was expired in March 2026.

In May 2026, a new "Walt Disney Studios" themed land opened at Disney's Hollywood Studios in Walt Disney World, Florida, featuring replicas of the Burbank lot’s architecture and facilities.

In July 2026, Feige, Winderbaum, and Abdgo announced that Marvel Comics would relocate its headquarters and over 100 employees from Manhattan, New York to the Walt Disney Studios lot in Burbank, California by the following July (thus joining Marvel Studios staff), and that veteran comics editor Stephen Wacker would succeed Cebulski as editor-in-chief.

== Facilities ==
=== Team Disney – The Michael D. Eisner Building ===
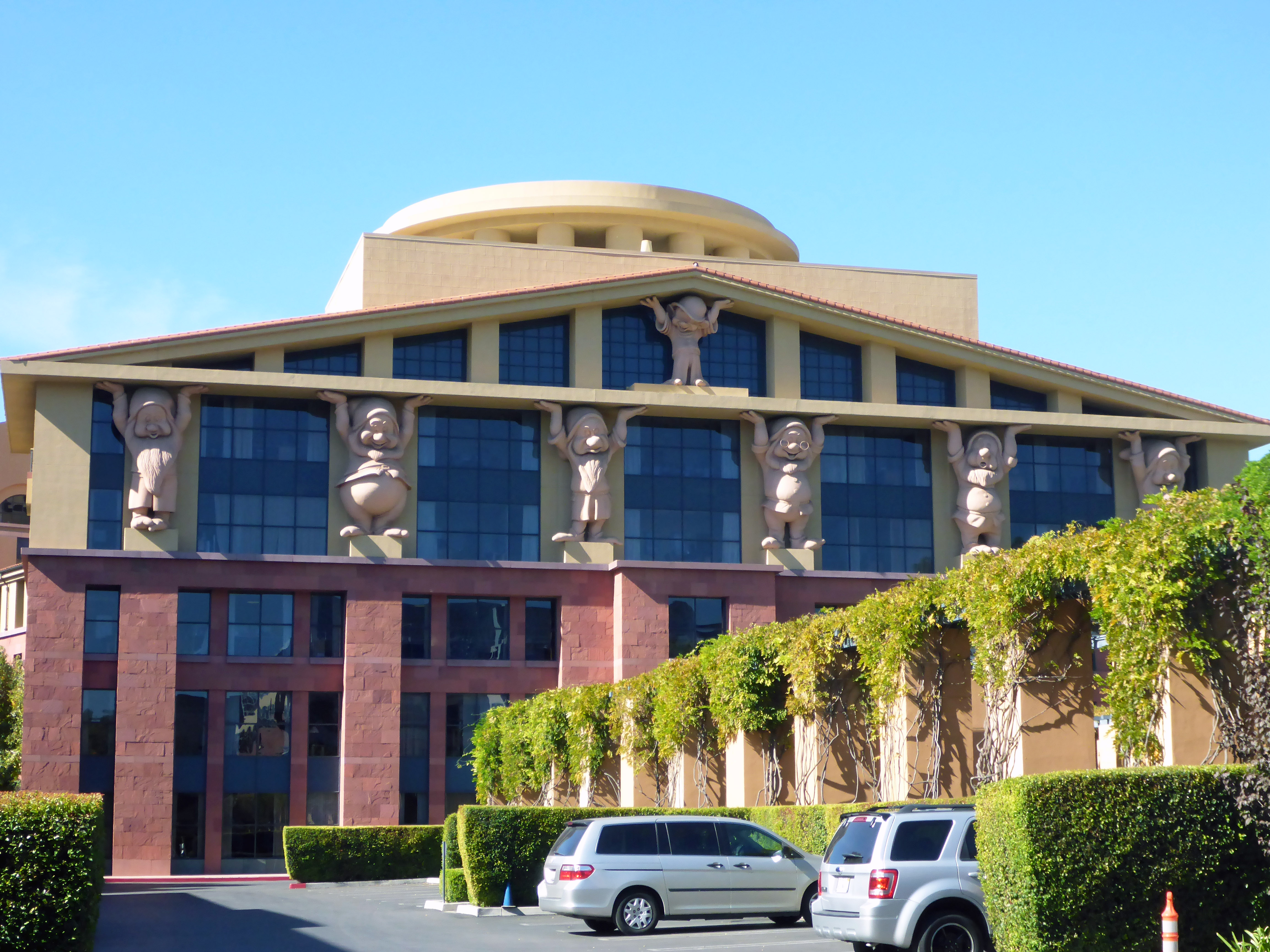
The "Team Disney" building

Formerly known as the Team Disney Burbank building, Team Disney – The Michael D. Eisner Building is the main building located at the Walt Disney Studios. Completed in 1990 and designed by Michael Graves, the Team Disney Burbank building contains the office of CEO Josh D'Amaro as well as the boardroom for the board of directors. It also houses offices for members of Senior Management, such as Alan Bergman, chairman of Walt Disney Studios. Prior to the opening of the Team Disney Burbank building in 1990, Disney executives were located in the old Animation building and the Roy O. Disney Building; the animators had been forced to relocate in 1985 into a series of warehouses, trailers, and hangars in nearby Glendale.

The Team Disney structure is sometimes called the "Seven Dwarfs Building". It has large sculpted atlantes of the Seven Dwarfs holding up the roof of the eastern façade, an homage to the animated film Snow White and the Seven Dwarfs, which provided Walt Disney with the revenue to purchase the Burbank lot. Each statue is 19 feet (5.8 meters) tall, with the exception of the 2/3-sized Dopey at top. The building is located opposite the Frank G. Wells building, named for Eisner's former colleague, and president of the Walt Disney Company from 1984 to 1994. In 1996, the building was featured in Hollywood Pictures film Spy Hard. On January 23, 2006, in honor of Michael Eisner's 21-year leadership of the company, the Team Disney building was rededicated as Team Disney – The Michael D. Eisner Building.

=== Disney Legends Plaza ===
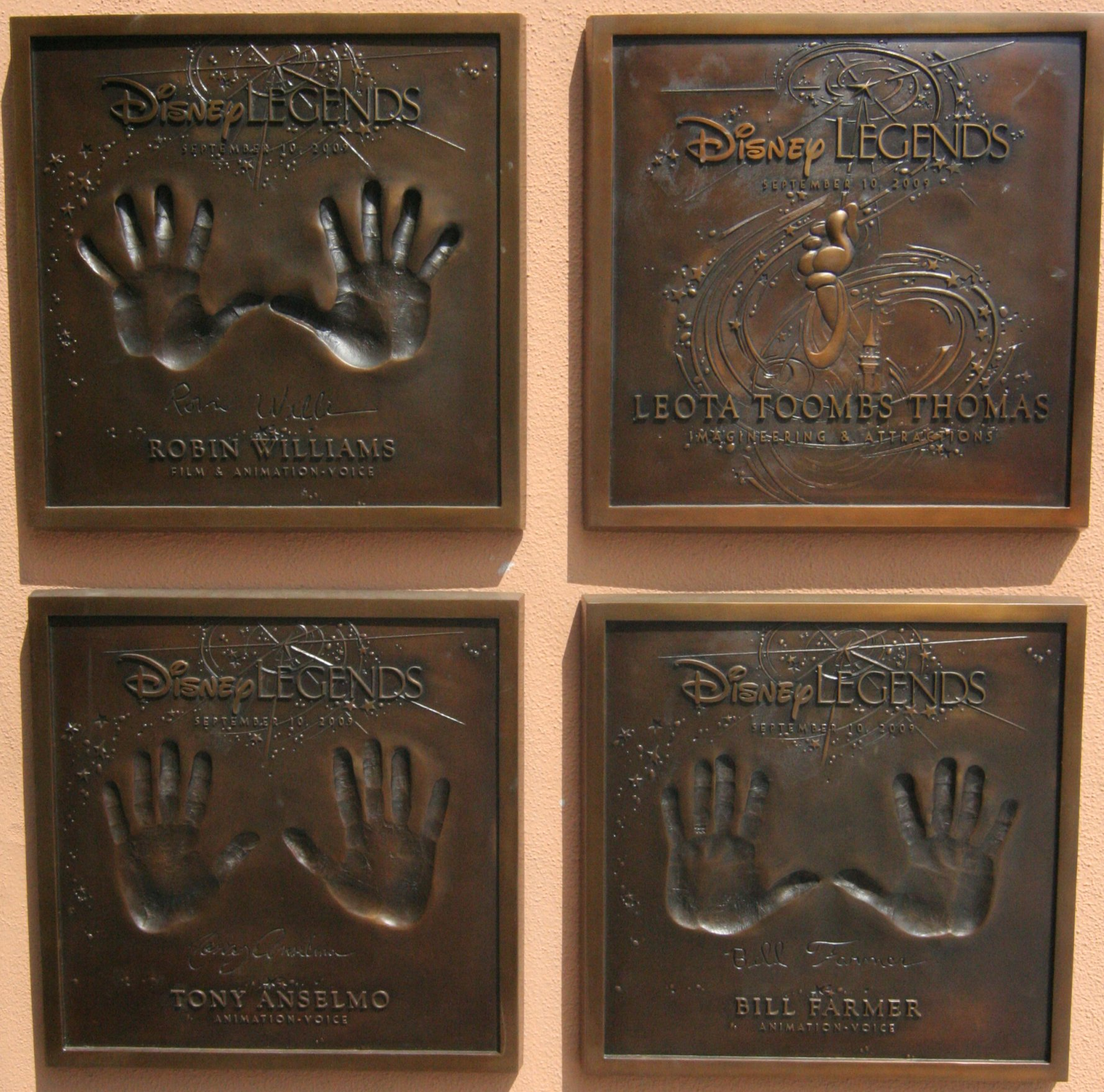
A portion of the Disney Legend plaques honoring recipients Robin Williams, Leota Toombs, Tony Anselmo, and Bill Farmer.

Disney Legends Plaza, located between the Team Disney: The Michael D. Eisner building and the Frank G. Wells building, is the central hub for the Disney Legends award and pays homage to its recipients. Dedicated on October 18, 1998, the plaza features the Partners statue of Walt Disney and Mickey Mouse, designed by Imagineer Blaine Gibson, along with a replica statue of Roy O. Disney and Minnie Mouse which can also be found at the Magic Kingdom park.

Located on the pillars in the plaza are bronze plaques featuring receivers of the Disney Legends award. The plaques feature the recipient's name, reason for gaining the award, and the person's handprints and signature if they were alive at the time they received the award. Most famously, Legendary Animator and Imagineer, Ward Kimball's plaque features an extra finger, a reminder of Kimball's sense of humor. If, however, the award was presented posthumously, an image of the Disney Legends statue is engraved instead of the traditional handprints and signature.

The plaza formerly featured a small fountain to honor the Legends, but that was since removed due to water leakage.

=== Frank G. Wells Building ===
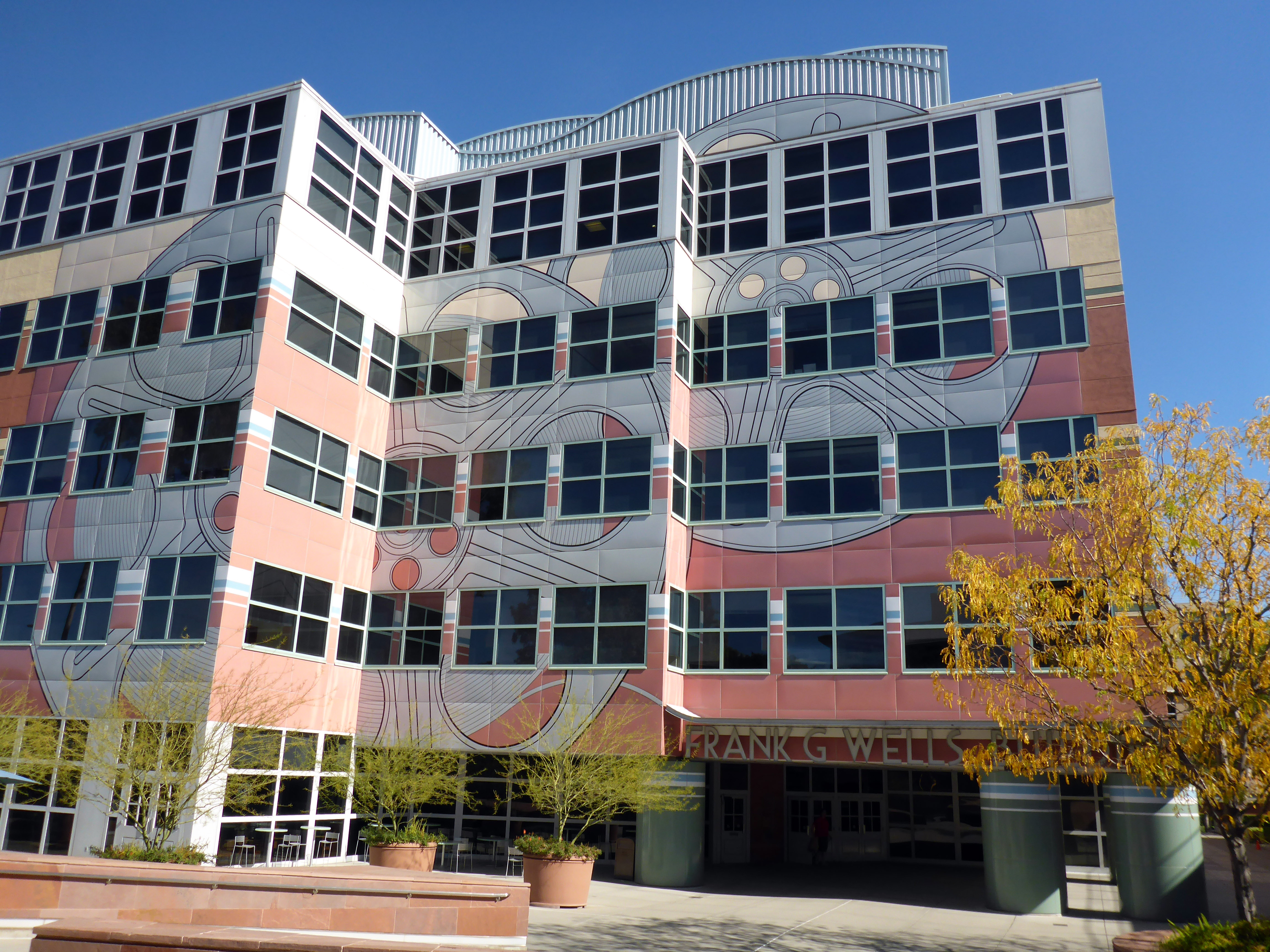
The Frank G. Wells Building

This building is dedicated to the former president of the Walt Disney Company from 1984 to 1994, Frank G. Wells. Designed by Venturi, Scott Brown and Associates, the building opened in 1998 and was dedicated by Wells's widow Luanne Wells, and company CEO Michael Eisner.

The five-story building has a usable area of 240,518 square feet (22,344.9 m^{2}) with three underground parking levels, accommodating 600 parking spaces. The construction was completed in two phases: phase I in August 1997 and phase II in July 1998. The Frank G. Wells building was specifically designed for Walt Disney Television Animation, and the division formerly had offices located on the third floor. In 2011, the division has since moved to the Grand Central Creative Campus in nearby Glendale, California.

It is distinctly recognizable through its giant movie reel and film strip on the building's exterior. The building is currently home to the Walt Disney Archives, studio mail center, Marvel Studios, the Disney Music Group, a screening room, various multipurpose rooms, and one of the three extant multiplane cameras (which is on display in the lobby). It was formerly home to Walt Disney Television, various management offices, and the human resources department.

The Archives are located on the ground floor and are open to all cast members; they also have additional storage and restricted areas on other floors. The Studio's Starbucks Coffee shop is also located on the ground floor.

=== Animation Building ===
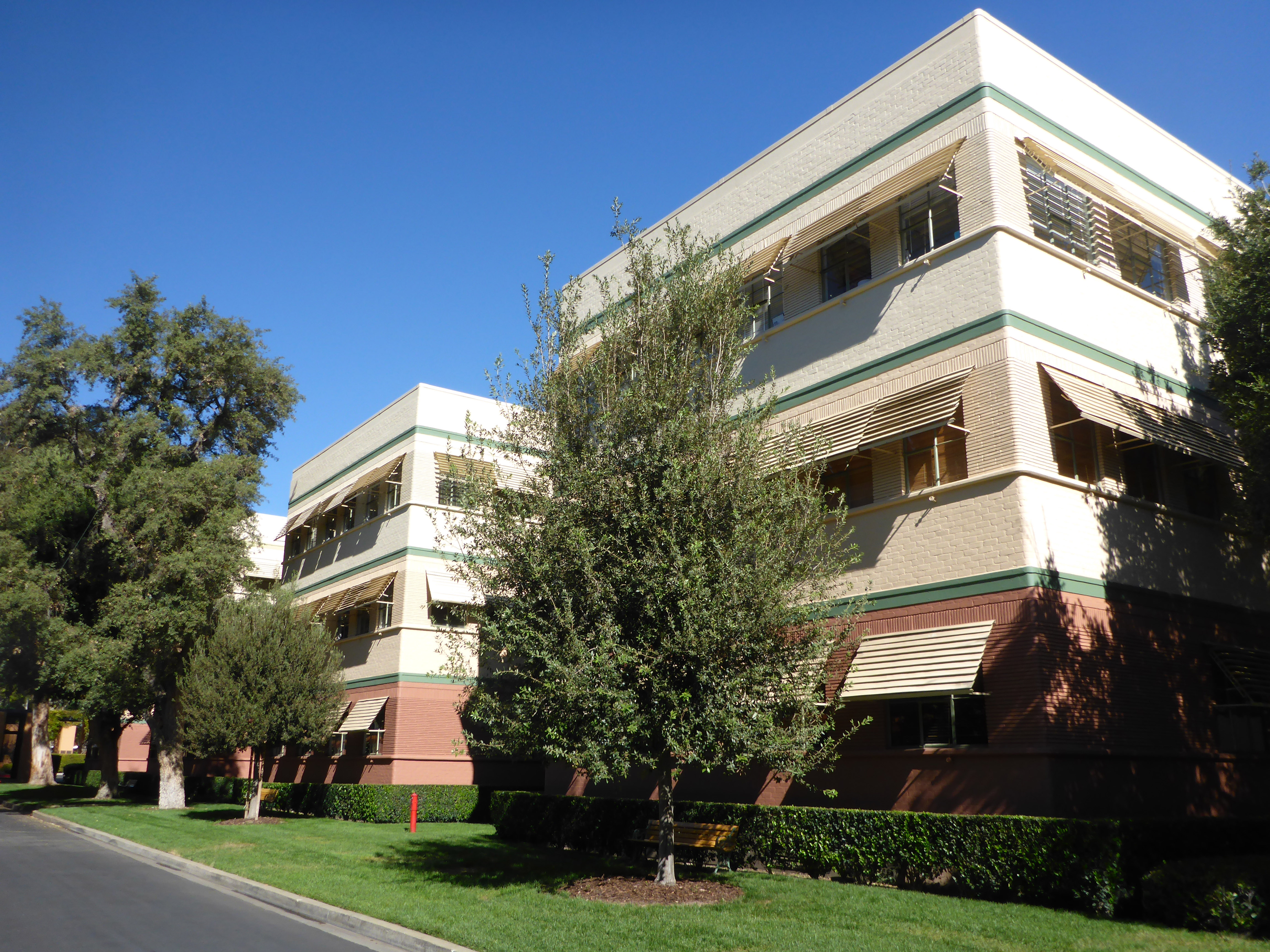
The original Animation Building

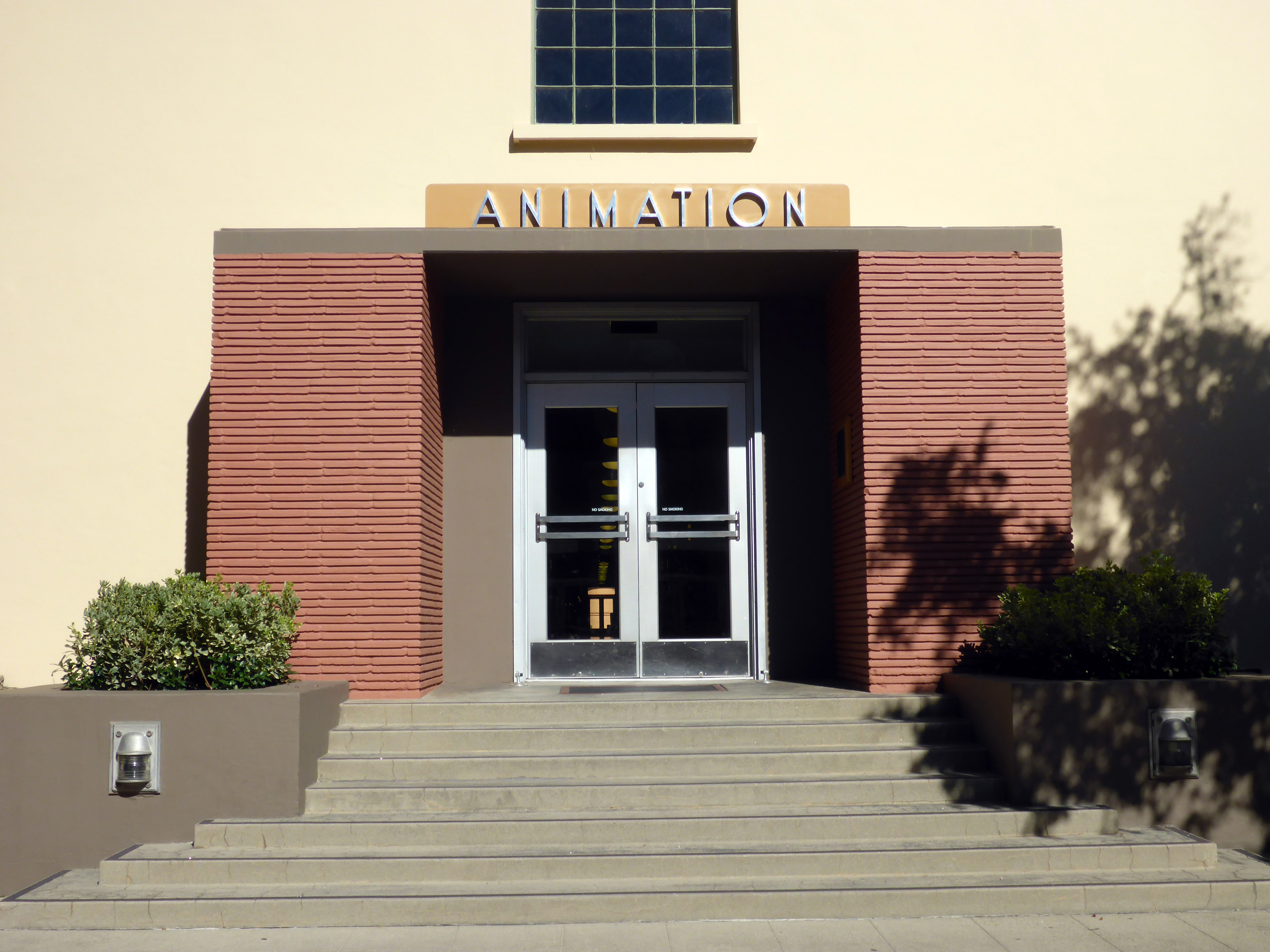
The building's south entrance

The three-story former main building for Walt Disney Animation Studios was completed in 1940, based on a Streamline Moderne design by industrial designer and architect Kem Weber. It is considered the jewel of the original studio buildings. Walt Disney personally supervised the eight-wing "double H" design, ensuring as many rooms as possible had windows, which allowed natural light into the building to help the animators while working. Many Disney animated features were drawn here, including Dumbo (1941), Bambi (1942), Cinderella (1950), Alice in Wonderland (1951), Peter Pan (1953), Lady and the Tramp (1955), Sleeping Beauty (1959), One Hundred and One Dalmatians (1961), The Jungle Book (1967), The Aristocats (1970), The Rescuers (1977), and The Fox and the Hound (1981). The animation for The Black Cauldron (1985) was the last to be completed at the site.

The Animation Building initially served as the creative and administrative nucleus for the entire studio. Walt's brother Roy O. Disney, who ran the company's financial operations, shared a wing with the accounting and legal departments on the first floor, which was where the animators, in-betweeners and clean-up artists worked. The D-Wing's ground floor was the longtime domain of Disney's Nine Old Men, and over the years other prominent animators and artists such as Bill Tytla, Fred Moore, Norm Ferguson, Preston Blair, Eyvind Earle, Tyrus Wong, Mary Blair, Andreas Deja, Floyd Norman, John Lasseter, Glen Keane, John Musker and Ron Clements worked in the building. On the second floor were office suites for the directors and studios for the background and layout artists. The story department was located on the third floor, along with offices and a rehearsal room for Disney's composers and arrangers.

Suite 3H, on the third floor of the Animation Building's H-Wing, was Walt's headquarters. The five-room space included his two adjacent offices: a "formal" corner office for signing contracts and meeting with important visitors, and a "working office" where he huddled with key staff to develop ideas for his films, television shows and theme parks. The latter had a kitchenette hidden behind wood paneling that retracted at the touch of a button, as Walt often ate lunch at his desk. Also in the suite was his secretary's office, featuring displays of his numerous awards, and a lounge area where Walt would relax after 5:00 pm with a drink (Scotch Mist was his cocktail of choice) and a back massage from the studio nurse before going home. Walt's suite was closed after his death in 1966 and not reused until 1970, after his personal items had been carefully archived. Over the years these items were used in museum exhibits recreating his offices, primarily at Disney resorts. In 2015, under the auspices of the Walt Disney Archives, Suite 3H was restored as closely as possible to the condition in which Walt left it, with many of the original furnishings and objects. Walt Disney Company CEO Bob Iger dedicated the restoration on December 7 of that year. In 2016 it was opened for viewing by studio employees, special guests, and gold members of the Disney fan club D23.

A little-known feature of the Animation Building was its private rooftop annex, The Penthouse Club, a perk for male employees who could afford its membership fees. It had a gymnasium run by a full-time athletic instructor, a bar, a barber shop, steam baths, massage tables, pool and poker tables, and an outdoor patio which members tended to use for nude sunbathing. The entrance displayed a mural painted by animator Fred Moore depicting a bevy of nude or semi-nude women, surrounding a drunken single man bearing a certain resemblance to Moore himself. By the early 1960s the gym activities had ceased and it became a casual lounge for studio veterans. The Penthouse space has been shuttered for years and the Fred Moore mural removed to an unknown location.

The basement housed the Test Camera Department, which shot test loops of animation drawings in progress. Animators and directors would view these loops on Moviola machines to check the work before submitting it to Ink and Paint.

A utility tunnel linked the Animation Building with the neighboring Ink and Paint Building and the Camera and Cutting departments. It was built to ensure that the original animation drawings and painted cels could be safely transported from one location to another without being exposed to bad weather or other outside elements. The tunnel is still maintained and a length of it is open to D23 tours.

A popular point of interest for studio visitors is "Pluto's Corner", outside the Animation Building's A-Wing at the southwestern end of the block. There one can see three paw prints embedded in the street, curbside beneath a fire hydrant. A hind paw print is missing, humorously suggesting that Pluto used the hydrant to mark his territory. Nearby is the often-photographed signpost indicating the site's location at the corner of Mickey Avenue and Dopey Drive, with directions to various studio departments as they existed in Walt's era. (Today only the street names remain the same). According to longtime Disney archivist Dave Smith, the street sign – the only one of its kind on the Disney lot – was installed as a temporary prop for the "Studio Tour" segment of the Disney feature The Reluctant Dragon (1941) and never removed.

Starting on February 1, 1985, during the production of The Great Mouse Detective (released in 1986), Disney's Animation Department was moved off the Burbank lot into a cluster of old hangars, warehouses, and trailers located about two miles east (3.2 km) in Glendale, at the former site of the Grand Central Airport. Prior to the opening of the Team Disney Burbank building in 1990, Disney executives used the Animation Building as corporate offices. In 1995, animation production moved back to Burbank across the street from the main studios with the opening of the Walt Disney Feature Animation Building. Today, the original Animation Building is used primarily to house offices for various film and television producers who have distribution deals with Disney. Its exterior was a primary location for the 2013 film Saving Mr. Banks, though the interiors (including Walt's offices) were recreated at an outside studio.

=== Water Tower ===
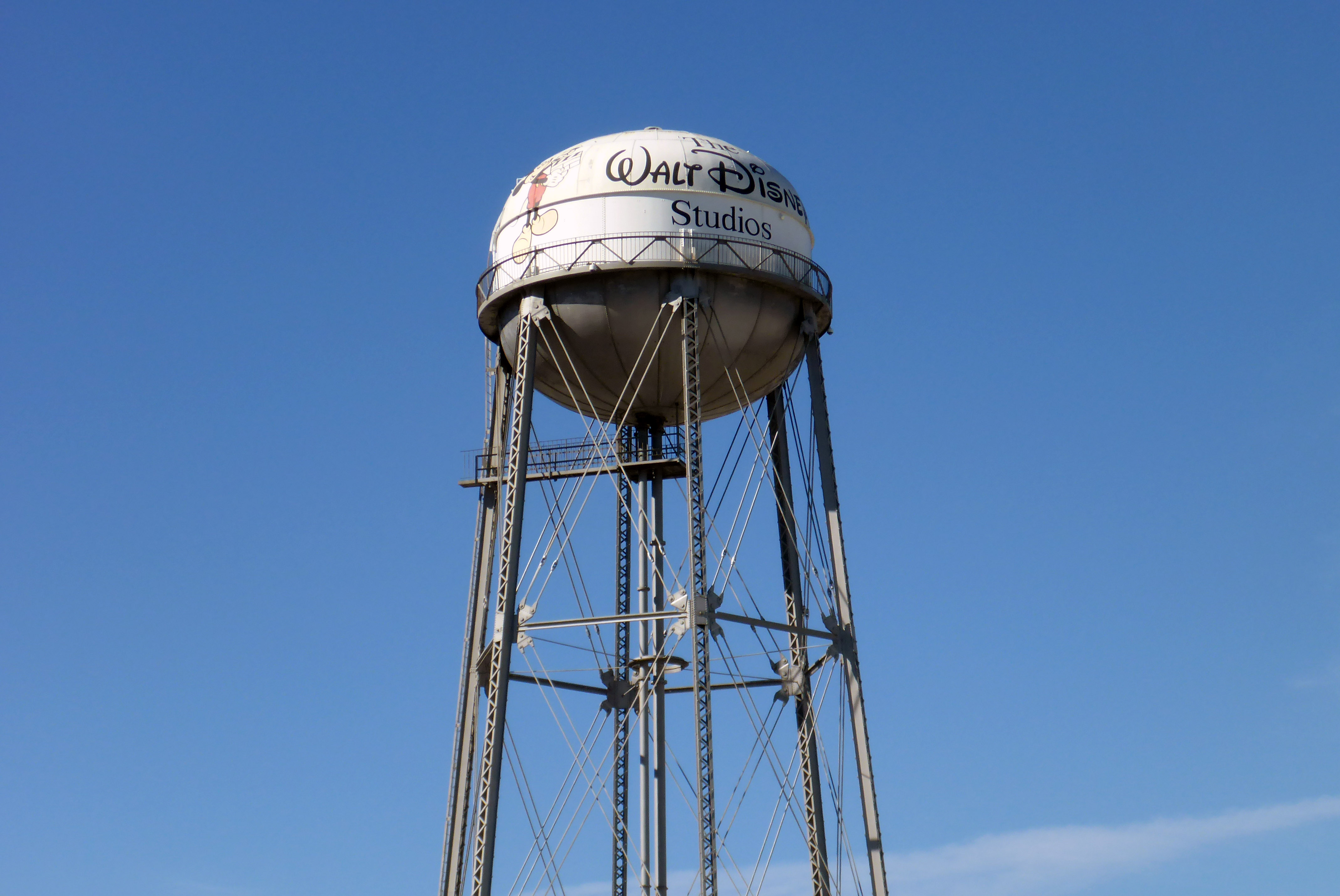
Walt Disney Studios Water Tower

Completed in 1939 at a cost of $300,000, the Water Tower was one of the first structures to emerge at the new Disney studio. It stands 135.6 feet (41.3 meters) high and originally held 150,000 gallons of water. Towers such as these provided an emergency water supply in case of fire and were a standard feature of major Hollywood studios of the era, examples of which can still be seen at the Warner Bros., Paramount and Sony Pictures Studios (formerly MGM) lots. Roy Disney, however, insisted that the Disney Studio's water tower be built with six legs instead of the usual four, claiming it was more aesthetically pleasing.

The tower is no longer used for water storage and stands as an identifying symbol of Disney's Burbank studio. In 1984 the top portion of the holding tank was painted white and, for the first time, emblazoned with the image of Mickey Mouse, the official mascot of the Walt Disney Company. It was the model for the Earffel Tower which stood at Disney's Hollywood Studios theme park near Orlando, Florida from 1989 to 2016, and the replica at Walt Disney Studios Park in Disneyland Paris (2002 to the present), though the original has never been decorated with Mickey Mouse ears on top.

=== The Roy O. Disney Building ===
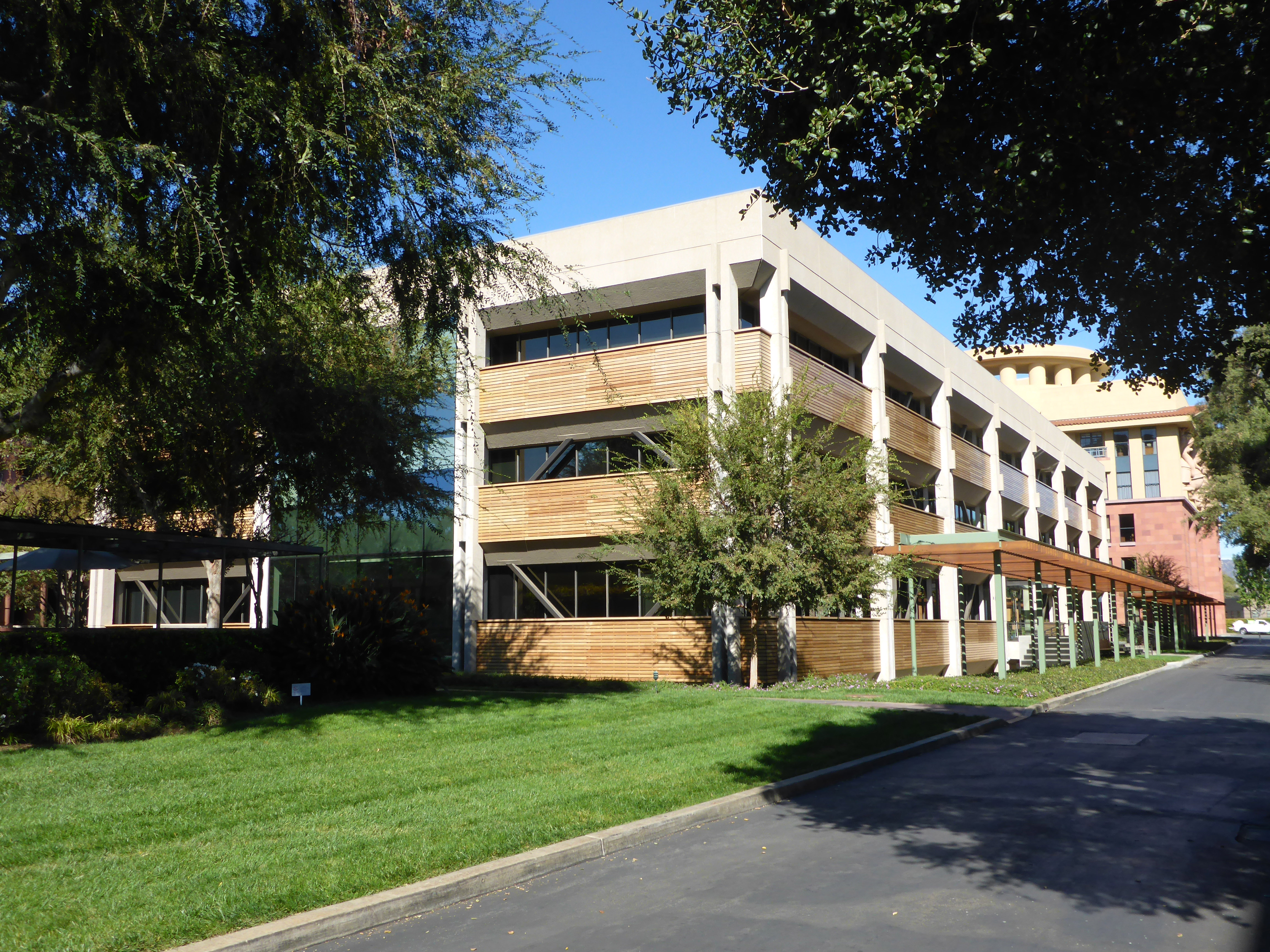
The Roy O. Disney Building

The Roy O. Disney building is located next to the animation building and held the office of Roy O. Disney to whom the building is dedicated. The building used to be the main administration building on the studio lot prior to the opening of the Team Disney – The Michael D. Eisner building. Today, it is home to Disney's legal department.

=== The Annette Funicello Stage, Stage 1 ===
Stage 1 was completed between 1939 and 1940 and is the original Disney soundstage on the Burbank lot. The soundstage was designed to replace a smaller stage at the former Hyperion Avenue Studio. Although the Walt Disney Studios predominantly made animated films, the soundstage was built in order to film Leopold Stokowski's segments in the 1940 film Fantasia. During World War II, the stage was used for repairing army vehicles. The soundstage was formerly dedicated to Fantasia, for it being the first motion picture that was filmed in the building. The stage is the smallest on the lot at 11,000 sq ft. It features a 2400 sq ft underwater tank and is still in active use. On June 24, 2013, it was dedicated to Mousketeer Annette Funicello as it was the original shooting stage for The Mickey Mouse Club.

=== The Julie Andrews Stage, Stage 2 ===
Constructed from 1947 and opening in April 1949, Stage 2 is the second oldest soundstage on the Walt Disney Studios lot, and at 31,000 feet (9,400 m), one of the largest in Los Angeles. It was built and financed by a joint agreement between Walt Disney and director Jack Webb, who used the stage for the filming of the television series Dragnet. In October 1955, Stage 2 began production on the first series of The Mickey Mouse Club. From 1954 to 1955 and prior to the opening of the facilities at Glendale California, WED Enterprises (now Walt Disney Imagineering) occupied soundstage 2 to build multiple attractions for Disneyland, including the Mark Twain Riverboat. Since then, Stage 2 has been used for the filming of multiple attractions for Walt Disney Parks and Resorts.

During the filming of Armageddon the filmmakers discovered the 40 feet high tall stage was not tall enough to hold one of the "asteroids" seen in the film. The floor was removed and an additional 20 feet was dug down to accommodate the 360-degree set for the scene. In 2001, soundstage 2 was dedicated to English actress Julie Andrews, because parts of Mary Poppins and parts of the then-current filming of The Princess Diaries took place inside this particular soundstage.

=== Stage 3 ===
Stage 3 was completed in 1953 and designed especially for the film 20,000 Leagues Under the Sea. The stage is 19,000 sq ft and contains an operational 3600 sq ft water tank that is divided into two parts for underwater and special effects filming.

The tank area was also used heavily beginning in the 1960s as Disney pioneered the use of the sodium screen process. In the 1970s, stage 3 was equipped with the first computerized motion control system. The ACES (Animated Camera Effects System) was designed by Disney engineers and broke new ground with technology which has become one of the foundations of current special effects photography.

=== Stages 4 and 5 ===
Stage 4, which was completed in 1958, was first used for Darby O'Gill and the Little People. Upon completing 30 years of service in 1998, Stage 4 was divided into two new television studios, creating the new Stage 4 and Stage 5. Stage 4 is known as the "Home Improvement stage", as that series was filmed here from 1991 to 1999.

=== Stages 6 and 7 ===
Stages 6 and 7, built in 1997 are the newest soundstages at the Walt Disney Studios. These audience-rated stages provide comprehensive production support with computer-controlled access, high-volume air-conditioning, and adjoining production support building. They are built on the former "Residential Street" and "Business Street" back-lot (seen in the films Something Wicked This Way Comes (1983), Fright Night (1985), and are located behind the Frank G. Wells Building. Both stages are 15,000 square feet (1,400 m^{2}) each and are in frequent use at the studios. Popular productions here have included, My Wife and Kids, The Muppets, 8 Simple Rules... for Dating My Teenage Daughter, The Geena Davis Show, and Brothers and Sisters.

=== The Hyperion Bungalow ===
The Bungalow was built in 1935 as the original home of the Disney Publicity and Comic Strip Departments. It was constructed at the Disney Studios on Hyperion Avenue in Hollywood and moved to the Burbank location as part of the construction process in 1939–1940. At the Disney Burbank lot, the building housed many support services over the years. Payroll, Publicity Support, Traffic and finally the Post Office were located in the building. The structure is the last remaining example of the "California Bungalow" type architecture that remains from the Hyperion studio facility. Its attractive style and utility, dating back to the early years of the company, give it a special place in the history of the Disney lot.

=== Main Theater ===
The 419-seat Theater, another original building on the Burbank lot, shows first-run Disney films for studio employees and guests. It has plush stadium seating and has been upgraded over the years to keep pace with new technology in the exhibition of films. Food and drink are not allowed inside.

Throughout its history, the theater has also been used for post-production sound mixing. According to the Disney production services website, "The Main Theater is a state-of-the-art digital sound dubbing and screening facility that was first used to mix the sound for Fantasia [in 1940]. Sound mixers blend dialogue, music, and sound effects tracks to the various levels appropriate for a movie theater. The acoustics are designed to simulate a theater that is three-quarters full. Although the theater is empty during the mixing session, extra padding in the seats and specially designed walls absorb and reflect the sound. This helps the sound mixers to know what the final product will sound like when it is released to the public."

The signage above the entrance says simply "Theatre". The name "Main Theater" is used to distinguish the venue from several smaller screening rooms situated throughout the studio. In Walt's era, these were called "sweatboxes", where animation test reels and the daily rushes of his live-action features were shown for his approval.

=== Ink and Paint Building ===
The 1940 Ink and Paint Building was where animators' drawings were inked onto transparent cels and then the cels were painted. It was built with high ceilings and a sophisticated central ventilation system so that the staff members would not be overcome by toxic paint fumes. One section was used as a special paint-mixing laboratory to provide Disney cartoons with the widest possible spectrum of colors. Three interior courtyards provided northern light for the artists and also served as outdoor break areas. It was a self-contained structure with its own cafeteria, lounge, and rooftop sundeck.

The sequestered layout reflected workplace attitudes of the era. As was common in the American animation industry of Disney's day, the Ink and Paint departments were staffed exclusively by women. In the early 1940s, Disney employed over 100 "ink and paint girls" at a starting salary of $18 a week, as opposed to $300 a week for experienced animators. A Disney employment brochure of the time stated: "Women do not do any of the creative work in connection with preparing the cartoons for the screen, as that work is performed entirely by young men...The only work open to women consists of tracing the characters on clear celluloid sheets with India ink and filling in the tracings on the reverse side with paint according to directions." Men and women at the Disney studio were not encouraged to fraternize, and the cloistered atmosphere of the Ink and Paint Building led wags on the lot to call it "The Nunnery".

The basement of the Ink and Paint Building was the location of Disney's famous "Morgue", where artwork from the studio's films was stored for possible future use. In a 1957 episode of his Disneyland TV series, Walt took viewers into the Morgue and, after some ghoulish fun on the room's name, explained its real function. In 1989, this archival material was moved to its current location at the Disney Animation Research Library in Glendale, California.

Technological advances in animation, such as the advent of Xerography in the early 1960s and the development of CAPS in the late 1980s, ultimately made traditional ink and paint techniques obsolete at the Disney studio. The last Disney animated feature to fully employ inked and painted cels was The Little Mermaid (1989). Today the Ink and Paint Building is primarily used for office space, though its original paint-mixing lab has been preserved and is used for the creation of limited edition Disney artwork created on-site.

=== Camera Building ===
The Camera Building, built in 1940, was where animation backgrounds and cels were traditionally photographed onto film. Unique original features were the "de-dusting chambers" that personnel, painted cels and other materials had to pass through before entering, so no trace of dust or lint would show up in the photography. In 1941 it housed two multiplane cameras, each standing 12 feet (3.7 meters) high and occupying its own room, and two conventional camera set-ups. A third multiplane camera was subsequently constructed.

Since 1990 the Camera Building has been occupied by what is now Buena Vista Imaging, which provides photo-optical and digital imaging services for films and television.

=== Cutting Building ===
Another original site on the Burbank lot, it is the longtime home of Disney's editing facilities. The building's name derives from the traditional method of physically cutting and splicing films shot on nitrate and (after 1952) safety stock. Today it employs video editing techniques.

=== Shorts Building ===
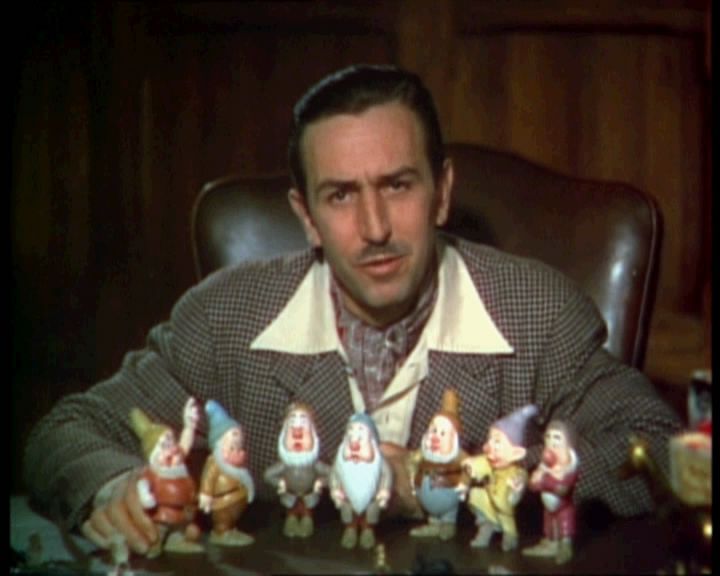
A 1937 image of Walt Disney (with figurines of the Seven Dwarfs) in his office at the former Hyperion studio. The office later became part of the Shorts Building on the Burbank lot

The two-story Shorts Building is one of the most significant remnants of Disney's former Hyperion studio. It originally consisted of two buildings, constructed in 1934 and 1937, to accommodate the company's rapidly expanding animation department. The 1934 structure was called the "Animation Building No. 2" and Walt and Roy Disney had their offices there prior to the move to Burbank. The animation for scores of Disney shorts of the 1930s, including The Band Concert (1935) and the Oscar-winning The Old Mill (1937), was created in this complex, and it was here that Walt hatched his risky idea for America's first full-length animated feature, Snow White and the Seven Dwarfs (1937).

In 1939 the two buildings were disassembled, transported to Disney's new Burbank lot, and reconstructed as a single T-shaped edifice, with the addition of a loading dock. (The window of Walt's old second-floor office can be seen directly above the dock). The colloquial name "Shorts Building" was apparently a nod to its historical past, as no further animation would be done on the premises. Since its relocation, the building has served the studio in support capacities, housing the publicity, comic strip, foreign relations, hair and makeup, and wardrobe fitting departments. The lot's Studio Operations department is now located here.

=== The Roy E. Disney Animation Building ===
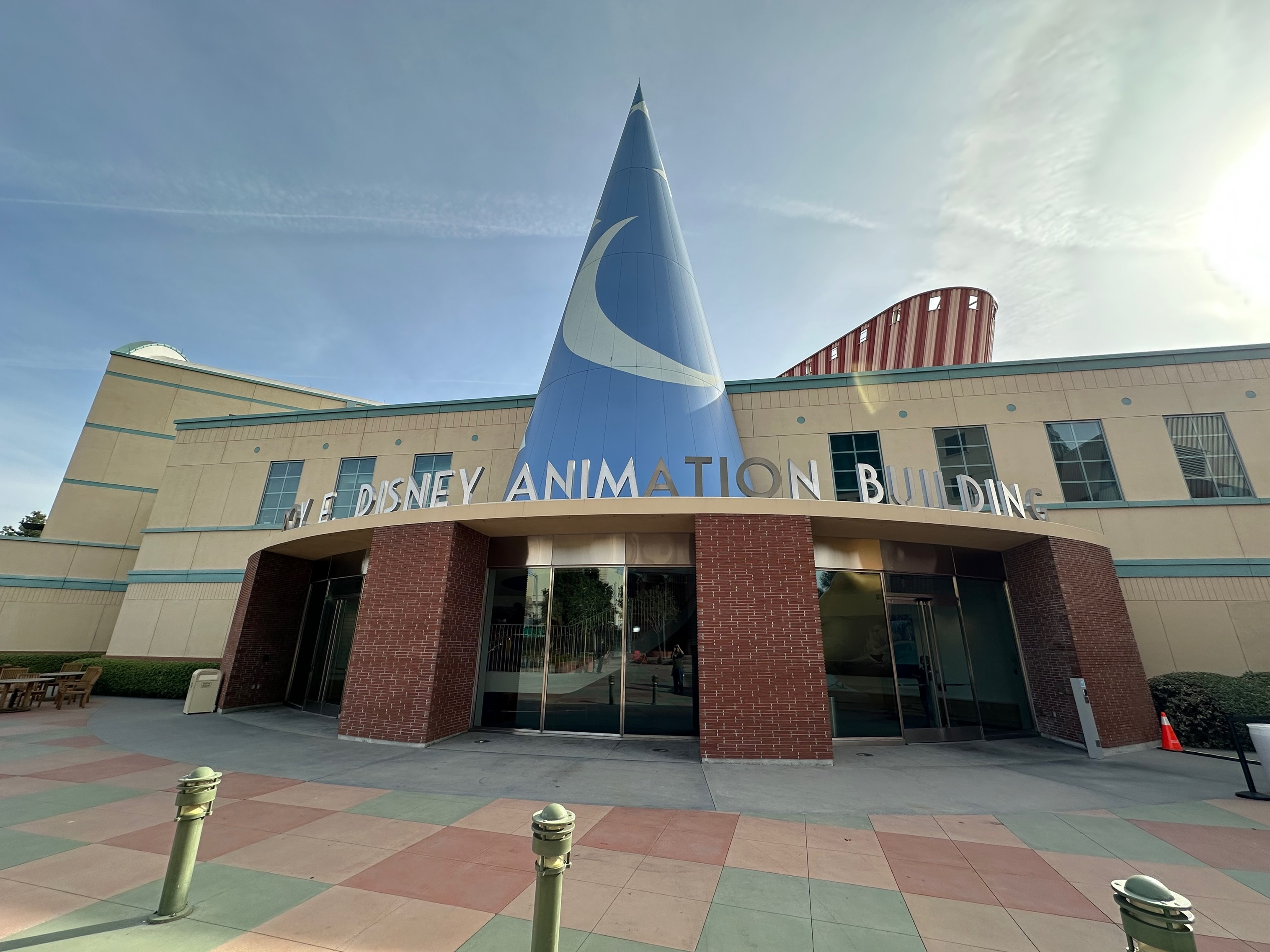
Roy E. Disney Animation Building

Formerly known as the Walt Disney Feature Animation Building in 1995, the Roy E. Disney building is the current home of Walt Disney Animation Studios, which sits to the south across Riverside Drive. It was designed by Robert A. M. Stern in association with Morris Architects.

As noted above, in 1985, Disney Animation was moved out of the studio lot and into a cluster of warehouses in Glendale. During Eisner's 1986 restructuring of the Walt Disney Company, the studio's animation division was spun off into Walt Disney Feature Animation as a separate subsidiary of the company. In 1992, construction began on a new 240,000 square feet (22,000 m^{2}) of the animation studio in Burbank, which was completed two years later.

The new studio is an architectural landmark, adorned by a 122-foot-tall version of the Fantasia Sorcerer's hat, which once housed the office of Roy E. Disney, the former chairman of Disney Feature Animation. It also displays the word "ANIMATION" in large letters on its south side to passersby on the Ventura Freeway.

In 2010, following the death of Roy E. Disney in 2009, the building was renamed and rededicated in his honor by Disney CEO Bob Iger. In January 2015, the building underwent a renovation, which was completed in sixteen months.

=== ABC Building ===
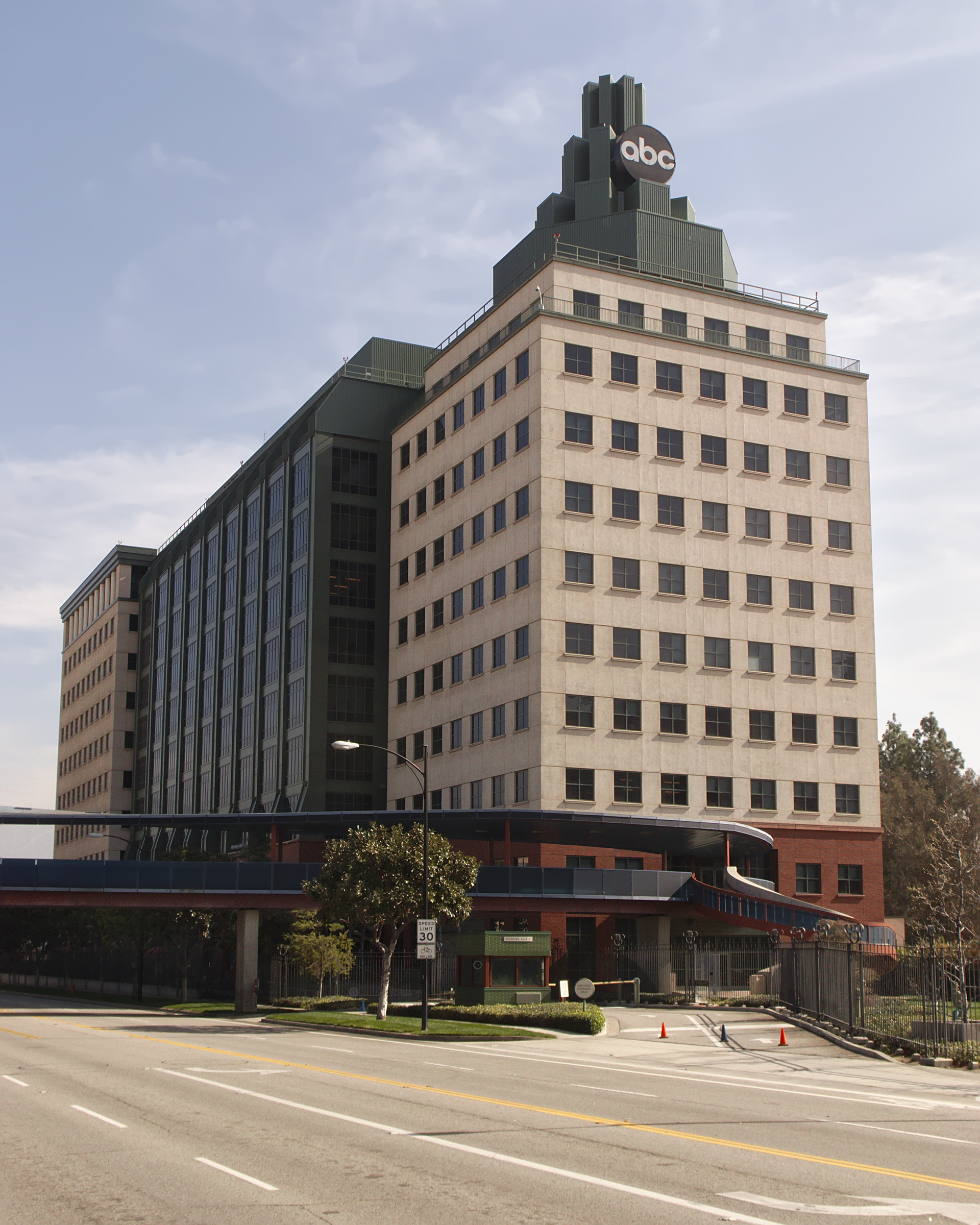
The ABC building on the Walt Disney Studios Riverside Drive property in Burbank, California. The blue pedestrian overpass seen in the lower left connects it to the larger Buena Vista lot.

After Disney's purchase of ABC in 1996, a new West Coast headquarters for the television network was constructed across Riverside Drive next to the Animation Building. The ABC building was designed by Aldo Rossi and is connected to the lot by a blue serpentine bridge that crosses over Riverside Drive.

=== Digital Studio Center ===
A two-story 17,000 square foot facility dedicated to post-production utilities and other, similar technical services. Opened in December 2012, the center is the home of Disney Digital Studio Services.

=== Original Commissary ===
This private cafeteria and grill opened in 1940 as Walt Disney's Studio Restaurant and is now named the Buena Vista Café. Along with Stage 1, the Cutting Building, and the Main Theater, it is one of the few original buildings on the Burbank lot still serving its initial purpose. The commissary offers breakfast and lunch for studio employees and guests, with indoor and outdoor seating. It once had an executive dining area called the Coral Room where Walt Disney occasionally lunched. The site was extensively remodeled in 2011, but Walt's favorite dish, chili served with crackers, remains on the menu.

A second, newer commissary is located inside the ABC Building, across from the main Disney lot on Riverside Drive in Burbank.

== Tenants ==
Disney units on the campus are:

- The Walt Disney Company (1940-present)
- Walt Disney Pictures (1940-present)
- Walt Disney Records (Disney Music Group) (1956-present)
- Walt Disney Archives (1970-present)
- Disney Television Animation (1984-2011)
- Walt Disney Animation Studios (1995-present)
- ABC (2000-present)
- Marvel Studios (2013-present)
- 20th Century Studios (2026-present)
- Searchlight Pictures (2026-present)
- 20th Television (2026-present)
- FX Networks (2026-present)
- Marvel Comics (2027)

== See also ==
- A Trip Through the Walt Disney Studios
- Once Upon a Studio - A 2023 short set in the Roy E. Disney Animation Building
- The Studios at Paramount
- Warner Bros. Studios Burbank
- Universal Studios Lot
- Sony Pictures Studios
