= Lists of Mexican films =

A list of the most notable films produced in the Cinema of Mexico split by decade of release. For an alphabetical list of articles on Mexican films see Category:Mexican films.

== By decade ==
- List of Mexican films of the 1890s
- List of Mexican films of the 1900s
- List of Mexican films of the 1910s
- List of Mexican films of the 1920s
- List of Mexican films of the 1930s
- List of Mexican films of the 1990s

== 1940–1989 ==
- 1940
- 1941
- 1942
- 1943
- 1944
- 1945
- 1946
- 1947
- 1948
- 1949
- 1950
- 1951
- 1952
- 1953
- 1954
- 1955
- 1956
- 1957
- 1958
- 1959
- 1960
- 1961
- 1962
- 1963
- 1964
- 1965
- 1966
- 1967
- 1968
- 1969
- 1970
- 1971
- 1972
- 1973
- 1974
- 1975
- 1976
- 1977
- 1978
- 1979
- 1980
- 1981
- 1982
- 1983
- 1984
- 1985
- 1986
- 1987
- 1988
- 1989

== 21st century ==
- 2000
- 2001
- 2002
- 2003
- 2004
- 2005
- 2006
- 2007
- 2008
- 2009
- 2010
- 2011
- 2012
- 2013
- 2014
- 2015
- 2016
- 2017
- 2018
- 2019
- 2020
- 2021
- 2022
- 2023
- 2024
- 2025
- 2026
- 2027
- 2028
- 2029
