= List of Mexican films of 2010 =

A list of the films produced in Mexico in 2010 (see 2010 in film):

== 2010 ==
Title	Director	Cast	Genre	Notes
180°	Fernando Kalife	Elizabeth Valdéz, Rodrigo Cachero, Daniel Martínez, Fernando Becerril, Juan Martín Jáuregui, Manuel Garcia-Rulfo, Eduardo Blanco, Iliana Fox, Alejandro Cuétara	Comedy-drama	
2033	Francisco Laresgoiti	Claudio Laforge, Sandra Echeverria		
Abel	Diego Luna	Geraldine Alejandra, Jose Maria Yazpik		
Chicogrande	Felipe Cazals	Damián Alcázar, Bruno Bichir		
Biutiful	Alejandro González Iñárritu	Javier Bardem, Maricel Alvarez		Nominated for two Academy Awards: Best Foreign Language Film (Mexico) and Academy Award for Best Actor for Javier Bardem.
El atentado	Jorge Fons	Daniel Giménez Cacho, Julio Bracho, Angelica Aragón		
Héroes Verdaderos	Carlos Kuri	Víctor Trujillo, Pepe Lavat, Jacqueline Andere, Kalimba Marichal, Sandra Echeverría, Mario Filio, Carlos Segundo, Raúl Carballeda, Humberto Vélez, Lisardo, Carlos Rivera, Lisset		
Hidalgo: La historia jamás contada	Antonio Serrano	Demián Bichir, Ana de la Reguera, Cecilia Suárez		
Año Bisiesto	Michael Rowe	Gustavo Sánchez Parra, Mónica del Carmen,		Caméra d'Or Winner at Cannes Film Festival for the best first feature film
El Infierno	Luis Estrada	Damián Alcázar, Joaquín Cosio, María Rojo,		Havana Film Festival, Grand Coral - First Prize; San Diego Latino Film Festival, Corazon Award (Best Film); Nominated for the 25th Goya Awards for the Goya Award for Best Spanish Language Foreign Film
No Eres tu, Soy yo	Alejandro Springall	Eugenio Derbez, Alejandra Barros, Martina García		
We Are What We Are	Jorge Michel Grau	Paulina Gaitán, Daniel Giménez Cacho	Drama/Horror	
Regresa	Alejandro González Padilla	Jaime Camil, Blanca Soto	Romantic comedy	
Tierra madre	Dylan Verrechia	Aidée González	Drama	Morelia International Film Festival, Jury Honorable Mention for Best Mexican Feature Film
Kites	Anurag Basu	Hrithik Roshan, Bárbara Mori	Romantic action	

== See also ==
- List of 2010 box office number-one films in Mexico
