= List of 2011 box office number-one films in Mexico =

This is a list of films which have placed number one at the weekend box office in Mexico during 2011.

== Number-one films ==
#	Date	Film	Gross (USD)	Openings in the top ten
1	January 2, 2011	Tron: Legacy	$2,084,555	Little Fockers (#2), The Next Three Days (#7)
2	January 9, 2011	Tron: Legacy	$1,546,548	Unstoppable (#4), Hereafter (#6)
3	January 16, 2011	The Tourist	$1,534,545	Splice (#8)
4	January 23, 2011	The Green Hornet	$2,525,698	Love & Other Drugs (#3), Let Me In (#6)
5	January 30, 2011	The Green Hornet	$1,724,566	Season of the Witch (#2), Burlesque (#5)
6	February 6, 2011	Yogi Bear	$2,852,035	Julia's Eyes (#2), True Grit (#7)
7	February 13, 2011	Yogi Bear	$1,886,589	Just Go with It (#2), Black Swan (#3), The Fighter (#7), Sin Memoria (#10)
8	February 20, 2011	The Rite	$2,971,175	Presumed Guilty (#5), The King's Speech (#6)
9	February 27, 2011	The Rite	$1,974,676	Big Mommas: Like Father, Like Son (#2), Sanctum (#4), No Strings Attached (#6), 127 Hours (#10)
10	March 6, 2011	Rango	$2,637,913	I Am Number Four (#5)
11	March 13, 2011	Rango	$2,164,257	Battle: Los Angeles (#3)
12	March 20, 2011	Rango	$1,296,512	Mars Needs Moms (#2), Unknown (#3), Saving Private Perez (#4)
13	March 27, 2011	Gnomeo & Juliet	$1,316,539	La Otra Familia (#4), Sucker Punch (#7), Justin Bieber: Never Say Never (#8)
14	April 3, 2011	Gnomeo & Juliet	$1,195,782	The Adjustment Bureau (#3), Drive Angry (#9)
15	April 10, 2011	Rio	$5,149,221	
16	April 17, 2011	Rio	$4,024,696	Hop (#2), Scream 4 (#3), Hall Pass (#4)
17	April 24, 2011	Rio	$3,069,573	Red Riding Hood (#2), Limitless (#4)
18	May 1, 2011	Thor	$7,201,607	Water for Elephants (#4)
19	May 8, 2011	Fast & Furious 5	$7,148,381	Garfield's Pet Force (#8)
20	May 15, 2011	Fast & Furious 5	$4,852,120	Priest (#3), The Lincoln Lawyer (#5)
21	May 22, 2011	Pirates of the Caribbean: On Stranger Tides	$9,912,317	Barney's Version (#9)
22	May 29, 2011	Pirates of the Caribbean: On Stranger Tides	$5,569,835	The Hangover Part II (#2), Hoodwinked Too! Hood vs. Evil (#4)
23	June 5, 2011	X-Men: First Class	$4,740,081	All Good Things (#7)
24	June 12, 2011	Kung Fu Panda 2	$7,487,603	Source Code (#5), Sexo, Amor y Otras Perversiones 2 (#8)
25	June 19, 2011	Kung Fu Panda 2	$5,092,135	Insidious (#4), The Beaver (#7), The Eagle (#9)
26	June 26, 2011	Cars 2	$8,242,857	The Dilemma (#5)
27	July 3, 2011	Transformers: Dark of the Moon	$10,197,801	Something Borrowed (#4)
28	July 10, 2011	Transformers: Dark of the Moon	$4,785,907	Zookeeper (#3), Paranormal Activity 2: Tokyo Night (#6), Rabbit Hole (#9)
29	July 17, 2011	Harry Potter and the Deathly Hallows – Part 2	$15,863,441	
29	July 24, 2011	Harry Potter and the Deathly Hallows – Part 2	$4,973,685	Mr. Popper's Penguins (#2), Bad Teacher (#5)
30	July 31, 2011	Captain America: The First Avenger	$8,089,424	Monte Carlo (#6)
31	August 7, 2011	The Smurfs	$3,612,267	Super 8 (#3), Horrible Bosses (#4), Midnight in Paris (#7)
32	August 14, 2011	Green Lantern	$4,647,930	The Lion King 3D (#5)
33	August 21, 2011	Green Lantern	$2,487,153	Crazy, Stupid, Love (#3), The Possession of Emma Evans (#10)
34	August 28, 2011	Cowboys & Aliens	$1,916,130	Aphrodite Les Folies – Live in London (#10)
35	September 4, 2011	Rise of the Planet of the Apes	$4,235,071	Larry Crowne (#5), Beastly (#8), Paul (#9)
36	September 11, 2011	Rise of the Planet of the Apes	$2,528,841	Fright Night (#2), Conan the Barbarian (#4), Bridesmaids (#6), The Resident (#10)
37	September 18, 2011	Don Gato y su Pandilla	$3,342,039	Friends with Benefits (#3), Don't Be Afraid of the Dark (#4)
38	September 25, 2011	Don Gato y su Pandilla	$1,805,665	The Change-Up (#2), Final Destination 5 (#4), Hierro (#8)
39	October 2, 2011	Abduction	$1,219,931	What's Your Number? (#5), Viento en Contra (#9)
40	October 9, 2011	Real Steel	$2,991,326	Labios Rojos (#4), I Don't Know How She Does It (#5)
41	October 16, 2011	Real Steel	$2,589,059	Dream House (#2), Moneyball (#3), The Greatest Miracle (#5), Killer Elite (#6)
42	October 23, 2011	Paranormal Activity 3	$1,919,043	Johnny English Reborn (#3), La Leyenda de la Llorona (#4), The Tree of Life (#8)
43	October 30, 2011	Paranormal Activity 3	$1,473,570	The Three Musketeers (#4), Contagion (#5)
44	November 6, 2011	Paranormal Activity 3	$944,666	In Time (#2), Dolphin Tale (#6), Monsters (#10)
45	November 13, 2011	Jack & Jill	$2,644,398	Pastorela (#2), The Debt (#10)
46	November 20, 2011	The Twilight Saga: Breaking Dawn – Part 1	$6,699,100	Happy Feet Two (#2)
47	November 27, 2011	The Twilight Saga: Breaking Dawn – Part 1	$2,744,130	The Muppets (#2), The Thing (#7), Warrior (#8)
48	December 4, 2011	Puss in Boots	$3,675,962	The Skin I Live In (#7)
49	December 11, 2011	Puss in Boots	$2,485,977	Arthur Christmas (#3), Tower Heist (#4), 11-11-11 (#9)
50	December 18, 2011	Alvin and the Chipmunks 3	$1,518,400	Immortals (#3), New Year's Eve (#4), Sleep Tight (#8)
51	December 25, 2011	Mission: Impossible – Ghost Protocol	$1,967,186	We Bought a Zoo (#8)
52	January 1, 2012	Sherlock Holmes: A Game of Shadows	$2,023,876	The Adventures of Tintin: The Secret of the Unicorn (#3), A Little Bit of Heaven (#8)

== Highest-grossing films ==
Highest-grossing films of 2011
Rank	Title	Distributor	Gross (USD)
1.	Harry Potter and the Deathly Hallows – Part 2	Warner Bros.	$34,163,720
2.	Transformers: Dark of the Moon	Paramount	$30,502,854
3.	Pirates of the Caribbean: On Stranger Tides	Disney	$28,992,018
4.	Rio	20th Century Fox	$26,619,086
5.	Fast & Furious 5	Universal	$25,942,449
6.	Cars 2	Disney	$25,508,290
7.	Kung Fu Panda 2	Paramount	$24,391,091
8.	The Smurfs	Sony	$21,069,657
9.	Captain America: The First Avenger	Paramount	$20,224,903
10.	Thor	Paramount	$19,547,866

== See also ==
- List of Mexican films — Mexican films by year

Preceded by 2010	Box office number-one films of Mexico; 2011	Succeeded by 2012
