= List of 2012 box office number-one films in Mexico =

This is a list of films which placed number one at the weekend box office in Mexico for the year 2012.

== Number-one films ==
| # | Date | Film | Gross (USD) | Openings in the top ten |
|---|---|---|---|---|
| 1 | January 8, 2012 | Sherlock Holmes: A Game of Shadows | $1,771,908 | J. Edgar (#6) |
| 2 | January 15, 2012 | The Darkest Hour | $1,307,082 | Beauty and the Beast 3D (#7), War Horse (#10) |
| 3 | January 22, 2012 | The Girl with the Dragon Tattoo | $1,246,501 | Spy Kids: All the Time in the World (#4) |
| 4 | January 29, 2012 | Underworld: Awakening | $1,978,676 | Hugo (#3), Man on a Ledge (#4), The Ides of March (#7), Drive (#9) |
| 5 | February 5, 2012 | Journey 2: The Mysterious Island | $2,953,283 | The Descendants (#4) |
| 6 | February 12, 2012 | Journey 2: The Mysterious Island | $2,089,838 | The Woman in Black (#2), Star Wars: Episode I – The Phantom Menace 3D (#3), The Vow (#4), Tinker Tailor Soldier Spy (#10) |
| 7 | February 19, 2012 | The Woman in Black | $1,608,549 | Ghost Rider: Spirit of Vengeance (#2), Contraband (#6), The Artist (#7) |
| 8 | February 26, 2012 | The Devil Inside | $2,171,375 | De Panzazo! (#4), Extremely Loud & Incredibly Close (#6) |
| 9 | March 4, 2012 | The Devil Inside | $1,215,759 | Chronicle (#2), Safe House (#3), El Cielo en tu Mirada (#8) |
| 10 | March 11, 2012 | John Carter | $3,418,258 | |
| 11 | March 18, 2012 | John Carter | $2,781,450 | This Means War (#2), The Grey (#3), Project X (#9) |
| 12 | March 25, 2012 | The Hunger Games | $3,569,133 | Black Gold (#8) |
| 13 | April 1, 2012 | Wrath of the Titans | $5,024,271 | The Lorax (#2), Aqui entre Nos (#4) |
| 14 | April 8, 2012 | Wrath of the Titans | $2,956,317 | Mirror Mirror (#3), American Reunion (#5), Habemus Papa (#9) |
| 15 | April 15, 2012 | Titanic 3D | $1,893,376 | REC 3: Genesis (#7), Wanderlust (#8), Días de Gracia (#10) |
| 16 | April 22, 2012 | Titanic 3D | $1,390,818 | For Greater Glory (#2), The Pirates! Band of Misfits (#5), Intruders (#10) |
| 17 | April 29, 2012 | The Avengers | $17,439,946 | |
| 18 | May 6, 2012 | The Avengers | $9,463,940 | 21 Jump Street (#2), Apartment 143 (#3), The Best Exotic Marigold Hotel (#5) |
| 19 | May 13, 2012 | The Avengers | $5,532,722 | Battleship (#2), Casa de Mi Padre (#3), My Week with Marilyn (#9) |
| 20 | May 20, 2012 | The Avengers | $3,500,825 | The Lucky One (#3), The Raven (#5), Trespass (#6), Friends with Kids (#7) |
| 21 | May 27, 2012 | Men in Black 3 | $5,739,938 | Act of Valor (#5), Flypaper (#9) |
| 22 | June 3, 2012 | Snow White & the Huntsman | $4,901,040 | Gimme the Power (#6), The Double (#9) |
| 23 | June 10, 2012 | Madagascar 3: Europe's Most Wanted | $6,763,212 | Colosio: El Asesinato (#4), Albert Nobbs (#7) |
| 24 | June 17, 2012 | Madagascar 3: Europe's Most Wanted | $4,875,642 | Prometheus (#2), Salmon Fishing in the Yemen (#8) |
| 25 | June 24, 2012 | Madagascar 3: Europe's Most Wanted | $3,696,557 | Dark Shadows (#2), Get the Gringo (#5) |
| 26 | July 1, 2012 | Ice Age 4 | $11,462,936 | A Dangerous Method (#8) |
| 27 | July 8, 2012 | The Amazing Spider-Man | $9,355,699 | |
| 28 | July 15, 2012 | The Amazing Spider-Man | $5,243,245 | Chernobyl Diaries (#3), Savages (#4), The Lady (#7) |
| 29 | July 22, 2012 | Brave | $5,527,668 | To Rome with Love (#6), That's My Boy (#7), Silent House (#8) |
| 30 | July 29, 2012 | The Dark Knight Rises | $9,733,087 | |
| 31 | August 5, 2012 | The Dark Knight Rises | $5,293,399 | ParaNorman (#3), Morgana (#6), Safe (#7) |
| 32 | August 12, 2012 | The Dark Knight Rises | $2,593,827 | Total Recall (#2), Finding Nemo 3D (#5), The Five-Year Engagement (#7) |
| 33 | August 19, 2012 | The Expendables 2 | $3,221,470 | Rock of Ages (#6), Katy Perry: Part of Me (#8), The Awakening (#9) |
| 34 | August 26, 2012 | The Expendables 2 | $1,811,353 | The Bourne Legacy (#2), The Dictator (#3), Girl in Progress (#7) |
| 35 | September 2, 2012 | Abraham Lincoln: Vampire Hunter | $2,564,647 | The Possession (#3) |
| 36 | September 9, 2012 | Abraham Lincoln: Vampire Hunter | $1,692,192 | Suave Patria (#2), Red Lights (#5), What to Expect When You're Expecting (#8) |
| 37 | September 16, 2012 | Ted | $2,068,495 | Tinker Bell and the Secret of the Wings (#2) |
| 38 | September 23, 2012 | Resident Evil: Retribution | $3,486,184 | Hecho en Mexico (#6), Tengo Ganas de Ti (#9) |
| 39 | September 30, 2012 | Hotel Transylvania | $3,612,223 | The Watch (#4), House at the End of the Street (#6), Dredd (#8) |
| 40 | October 7, 2012 | Hotel Transylvania | $2,606,099 | Taken 2 (#2), The Cabin in the Woods (#7), Viaje de Generación ($8) |
| 41 | October 14, 2012 | Hotel Transylvania | $1,721,570 | Frankenweenie (#3), Looper (#4), Sinister (#7) |
| 42 | October 21, 2012 | Paranormal Activity 4 | $2,200,983 | Después de Lucía (#6) |
| 43 | October 28, 2012 | Paranormal Activity 4 | $1,192,942 | Silent Hill: Revelation (#5), Seal Team 6: The Raid on Osama Bin Laden (#10) |
| 44 | November 4, 2012 | Wreck-It Ralph | $3,938,961 | Skyfall (#2) |
| 45 | November 11, 2012 | Wreck-It Ralph | $2,830,073 | Argo (#3), La Vida Precoz y Breve de Sabina Rivas (#4) |
| 46 | November 18, 2012 | The Twilight Saga: Breaking Dawn – Part 2 | $9,999,481 | |
| 47 | November 25, 2012 | The Twilight Saga: Breaking Dawn – Part 2 | $4,318,897 | Hidden Moon (#4), The Odd Life of Timothy Green (#7), Seven Psychopaths (#9), Premium Rush (#10) |
| 48 | December 2, 2012 | Rise of the Guardians | $3,230,044 | Trouble with the Curve (#5), El Santos vs. La Tetona Mendoza (#6), Ruby Sparks (#10) |
| 49 | December 9, 2012 | Rise of the Guardians | $2,522,602 | The Words (#5), When The Lights Went Out (#10) |
| 50 | December 16, 2012 | The Hobbit: An Unexpected Journey | $5,138,310 | |
| 51 | December 23, 2012 | The Hobbit: An Unexpected Journey | $2,351,486 | Life of Pi (#2), The Impossible (#3), Playing for Keeps (#5), Monsters, Inc. 3D (#6) |
| 52 | December 30, 2012 | Life of Pi | $2,300,719 | Parental Guidance (#4), Sammy's Adventures 2 (#6), Here Comes the Boom (#7), Cloud Atlas (#8) |

== Highest-grossing films ==
Highest-grossing films of 2012
| Rank | Title | Distributor | Gross (USD) |
|---|---|---|---|
| 1. | The Avengers | Disney | $61,748,523 |
| 2. | Ice Age 4 | 20th Century Fox | $46,845,581 |
| 3. | The Dark Knight Rises | Warner Bros. | $31,845,456 |
| 4. | The Twilight Saga: Breaking Dawn – Part 2 | Corazón Films | $29,577,943 |
| 5. | The Amazing Spider-Man | Sony | $28,742,331 |
| 6. | Madagascar 3: Europe's Most Wanted | Paramount | $25,949,927 |
| 7. | Brave | Disney | $21,620,740 |
| 8. | Life of Pi | 20th Century Fox | $20,350,935 |
| 9. | The Hobbit: An Unexpected Journey | Warner Bros. | $19,184,330 |
| 10. | Wrath of the Titans | Warner Bros. | $17,811,321 |

== See also ==
- List of Mexican films — Mexican films by year

| Preceded by 2011 | Box office number-one films of Mexico; 2012 | Succeeded by 2013 |
