= List of Mexican films of 2007 =

This is a list of Mexican films released in 2007.

== 2007 ==
Title	Director	Cast	Genre	Notes
2007
El brindis	Shai Agosin	Ana Serradilla, Francisco Melo, Pepe Soriano	Romance, Comedy-drama	
Cañitas	Julio César Estrada	Francesca Guillén		
Cuando las cosas suceden	Antonio Peláez			
Drama/Mex	Gerardo Naranjo			
Fuera del cielo	Javier Fox Patrón			
The Heartbreak Kid	Peter Farrelly, Bobby Farrelly	Ben Stiller, Michelle Monaghan, Malin Åkerman, Jerry Stiller, Rob Corddry, Carlos Mencia, Scott Wilson, Danny McBride	Black comedy	
J-ok'el	Benjamin Williams			
El violín	Francisco Vargas			
Niñas mal	Fernando Sariñana			
Morirse en domingo	Daniel Gruener			
Morirse está en hebreo	Alejandro Springall			
Sultanes del Sur	Alejandro Lozano	Tony Dalton, Ana de la Reguera		
El Ultimo Rey	Eduardo Barraza			
Bella	Alejandro Gomez Monteverde	Eduardo Verástegui		"People's Choice Award" at the 2006 Toronto International Film Festival and numerous other awards.
El Carnaval de Sodoma	Arturo Ripstein	Patricia Reyes Spíndola		
Déficit	Gael García Bernal	Gael García Bernal, Ana Serradilla	Drama	
Kilometro 31	Billy Rovzar	Illiana Fox, Irán Castillo		75% fresh rating on Rotten Tomatoes
La Misma Luna	Patricia Riggen	Adrian Alonso, Eugenio Derbez, Kate del Castillo		The film received generally favorable reviews from critics, getting a 72% fresh rating on Rotten Tomatoes based on 94 reviews from critics.
Silent Light	Carlos Reygadas		Drama	Cannes Film Festival: Jury Prize; Chicago International Film Festival: Gold Hugo (Best Feature)

== See also ==
- List of 2007 box office number-one films in Mexico
