= List of 2008 box office number-one films in Mexico =

This is a list of films that were number one at the weekend box office in Mexico during 2008.

== Number-one films ==
#	Date	Film	Gross (USD)	Openings in the top ten
1	January 6, 2008	Aliens vs. Predator: Requiem	$1,639,773	We Own the Night (#9)
2	January 13, 2008	National Treasure: Book of Secrets	$1,139,084	Mr. Woodcock (#9)
3	January 20, 2008	I Am Legend	$4,255,085	
4	January 27, 2008	I Am Legend	$2,342,608	The Orphanage (#2), The Bucket List (#3), The Hunting Party (#10)
5	February 3, 2008	Cloverfield	$1,544,683	American Gangster (#5), El Arca (#8)
6	February 10, 2008	The Orphanage	$1,235,141	Sweeney Todd: The Demon Barber of Fleet Street (#3), No Country for Old Men (#7), Atonement (#10)
7	February 17, 2008	27 Dresses	$1,073,328	Rambo (#3), Juno (#5), Llamando a un Ángel (#10)
8	February 24, 2008	Vantage Point	$860,229	The Eye (#2), Fool's Gold (#5), Fragile (#9)
9	March 2, 2008	Meet the Spartans	$1,353,495	P.S. I Love You (#4), Charlie Wilson's War (#6), The Mist (#7)
10	March 9, 2008	10,000 BC	$4,089,091	The Spiderwick Chronicles (#2)
11	March 16, 2008	10,000 BC	$2,981,643	Horton Hears a Who! (#2), August Rush (#6), La Zona (#8)
12	March 23, 2008	10,000 BC	$1,650,517	Under the Same Moon (#3), One Missed Call (#4), Drillbit Taylor (#5), Untraceable (#7)
13	March 30, 2008	Jumper	$2,022,488	I Could Never Be Your Woman (#8)
14	April 6, 2008	Jumper	$1,148,718	
15	April 13, 2008	Casi divas	$853,930	Shutter (#2)
16	April 20, 2008	Street Kings	$765,047	Ladrón que roba a Ladrón (#6), Definitely, Maybe (#9)
17	April 27, 2008	Street Kings	$565,564	Awake (#5), Death Sentence (#10)
18	May 4, 2008	Iron Man	$5,272,729	Made of Honor (#2), Bella (#8)
19	May 11, 2008	Iron Man	$2,363,274	Speed Racer (#2), 88 Minutes (#4)
20	May 18, 2008	The Chronicles of Narnia: Prince Caspian	$6,267,182	Bordertown (#6)
21	May 25, 2008	Indiana Jones and the Kingdom of the Crystal Skull	$4,130,734	A Guide to Recognizing Your Saints (#7)
22	June 1, 2008	Indiana Jones and the Kingdom of the Crystal Skull	$2,075,746	What Happens in Vegas (#2), Superhero Movie (#4), Déficit (#8)
23	June 8, 2008	You Don't Mess with the Zohan	$2,007,900	Sex and the City (#5)
24	June 15, 2008	The Incredible Hulk	$4,437,954	The Happening (#2)
25	June 22, 2008	Kung Fu Panda	$6,153,908	21 (#4)
26	June 29, 2008	Kung Fu Panda	$3,844,563	Get Smart (#2), Flawless (#9)
27	July 6, 2008	WALL-E	$5,391,590	Wedding Daze (#6), Alone with Her (#8)
28	July 11, 2008	Hancock	$4,813,231	Hellboy II: The Golden Army (#3)
29	July 20, 2008	The Dark Knight	$7,027,471	Nim's Island (#5)
30	July 27, 2008	The Dark Knight	$3,623,230	Journey to the Center of the Earth (#2), Meet Dave (#3)
31	August 3, 2008	The Mummy: Tomb of the Dragon Emperor	$5,154,872	Over Her Dead Body (#7)
32	August 10, 2008	The Mummy: Tomb of the Dragon Emperor	$2,403,902	The X-Files: I Want to Believe (#4), College Road Trip (#6), Prom Night (#7), The Other Boleyn Girl (#8)
33	August 17, 2008	Wanted	$2,286,535	Star Wars: The Clone Wars (#2), Mad Money (#10)
34	August 24, 2008	Wanted	$1,296,208	Taken (#2), Amor Letra por Letra (#6)
35	August 31, 2008	Taken	$866,755	Tropic Thunder (#3), REC (#4)
36	September 7, 2008	High School Musical: El Desafío	$1,892,347	Babylon A.D. (#2)
37	September 14, 2008	Arráncame la Vida	$1,521,959	Mamma Mia! (#2), Donkey Xote (#6), The Forbidden Kingdom (#7)
38	September 21, 2008	Arráncame la Vida	$1,422,163	Tinker Bell (#2), The Strangers (#3)
39	September 28, 2008	Arráncame la Vida	$1,024,389	Eagle Eye (#2), Bangkok Dangerous (#4)
40	October 5, 2008	Beverly Hills Chihuahua	$2,053,840	Mirrors (#2), Nights in Rodanthe (#4)
41	October 12, 2008	Beverly Hills Chihuahua	$1,791,388	My Mom's New Boyfriend (#6)
42	October 19, 2008	Beverly Hills Chihuahua	$1,240,207	Bajo la Sal (#2), Blindness (#4), Los Campeones de la Lucha Libre (#7), The Air I Breathe (#9)
43	October 26, 2008	Beverly Hills Chihuahua	$686,801	Burn After Reading (#2), Max Payne (#3), The House Bunny (#4), Space Chimps (#7), Spam (#8)
44	November 2, 2008	High School Musical 3: Senior Year	$1,780,752	Death Race (#4), Saw V (#7)
45	November 9, 2008	High School Musical 3: Senior Year	$1,019,824	Pride & Glory (#2), Mr. Magorium's Wonder Emporium (#3)
46	November 16, 2008	Quantum of Solace	$2,300,082	Navidad, S.A. (#2), Urmel aus dem Eis (#10)
47	November 24, 2008	Twilight	$2,469,236	Death Defying Acts (#4), The Duchess (#8)
48	November 30, 2008	Twilight	$1,693,660	Body of Lies (#2), Disaster Movie (#5), The Women (#6), The Boy in the Striped Pajamas (#10)
49	December 7, 2008	Madagascar: Escape 2 Africa	$4,455,100	Vicky Cristina Barcelona (#5), Solstice (#7)
50	December 14, 2008	Madagascar: Escape 2 Africa	$3,034,792	The Day the Earth Stood Still (#2), Mama's Boy (#9)
51	December 21, 2008	Bolt	$1,509,342	Rudo y Cursi (#2), Four Christmases (#5)
52	December 28, 2008	Bolt	$1,556,748	Australia (#5), The Tale of Despereaux (#6), Volverte a Ver (#7), Free Style (#10)

== Highest-grossing films ==
Highest-grossing films of 2008
Rank	Title	Distributor	Gross (USD)
1.	The Dark Knight	Warner Bros.	$24,966,893
2.	Kung Fu Panda	Paramount	$22,002,301
3.	Iron Man	Paramount	$19,728,577
4.	The Chronicles of Narnia: Prince Caspian	Disney	$19,278,912
5.	WALL-E	Disney	$17,679,805
6.	10,000 B.C.	Warner Bros.	$17,253,874
7.	Madagascar: Escape 2 Africa	Paramount	$16,865,859
8.	The Mummy: Tomb of the Dragon Emperor	Universal	$15,405,770
9.	Hancock	Sony	$14,177,721
10.	Journey to the Center of the Earth	Gussi Cinema	$13,871,400

== Notes ==
- List of Mexican films — Mexican films by year

Preceded by 2007	Box office number-one films of Mexico; 2008	Succeeded by 2009
