= Me la debes =

- Directed by: Carlos Cuarón
- Written by: Carlos Cuarón
- Produced by: Carlos Cuarón; Alfonso Cuarón; Jorge Vergara
- Starring: Eduarda Gurrolla; Marco Pérez; Fernando Becerril; Paloma Woolrich
- Cinematography: Alexis Zabe
- Edited by: Sebastián Garza
- Release date: 2001
- Running time: 12 minutes
- Language: Spanish

Me la debes (rough English translation: You owe me one) is a 2001 Mexican short film produced by Producciones Anhelo and directed by Carlos Cuarón. The film is a sex farce, satirizing the religious beliefs and sexuality of a Mexican middle-class family.

== Cast ==
- Fernando Becerril as Papá
- Paloma Woolrich as Mamá
- Flor Eduarda Gurrola as Marce
- Marco Pérez as Chivito
- Catalina López as Chela
