= Ellas, inocentes o culpables =

2000 Mexican telenovela

- Genre: Telenovela
- Written by: Eric Vonn
- Directed by: Antulio Jiménez Pons; Aurelio Ávila
- Starring: Lupita D'Alessio; Luis Uribe; Iliana Fox; Leonardo García; Jorge Luis Pila; Jorge Luke
- Country of origin: Mexico
- Original language: Spanish
- No. of episodes: 170

Production
- Executive producers: Antulio Jiménez Pons; Juan David Burns; Elisa Salinas
- Camera setup: Multi-camera
- Running time: 42-60 minutes

Original release
- Network: XHDF Azteca Trece
- Release: January 3 – August 25, 2000

Related
- Besos prohibidos (1999); El amor no es como lo pintan (2000-2001)

Ellas, inocentes o culpables, is a Mexican telenovela produced by Aurelio Ávila, Juan David Burns and Elisa Salinas for TV Azteca in 2000. It was broadcast on Azteca Trece (now Azteca Uno) from Monday, January 3, 2000 to Friday, August 25, 2000 for 170 episodes.

Lupita D'Alessio and Luis Uribe star as the main protagonists, Iliana Fox, Leonardo García and Jorge Luis Pila as co-protagonists, while Jorge Luke star as the main antagonists.

== Cast ==
- Lupita D'Alessio as Amanda
- Luis Uribe as Ángel
- Roberto Montiel as Roberto
- Jorge Luke as Sergio
- Iliana Fox as Vicky
- Leonardo García as Mario
- Jorge Luis Pila as Luis
- María Rojo as Martha
- Susana Alexander as María
- Enrique Novi as Damián
- Júlio Aldama as Hilario
- Fidel Garriga as Rogelio
- Gerardo Acuña as Nicolás
- Loló Navarro as Eulalia
- Vanessa Villela as Cristina
- Griselda Contreras as Mariana
- Ana Graham as Georgina
- Alejandro Gaytán as Jorge
- Géraldine Bazán as Liliana
- Ramiro Orci as Benito
- Beatriz Martínez as Marga
- Wendy de los Cobos as Cecilia
- Martha Acuña as Larissa
- Magdalena Cabrera as Rosa
- Graciela Orozco as Carmen
- Mauricio Ferrari as Marcelo
- Enrique Becker as Matías
- Julián Antuñano as Diego
- Gianni Constantini as Saúl
- Sandro Finoglio as Poncho
- Blas García as Comandante Cienfuegos
- Enrique Marine as Ricardo
- Mónica Mendoza as Janddy
- Eduardo Schillinsky as Armando
- Rutilio Torres as Pepe
- Rocío Verdejo as Regina
