= Carga de rurales =

- The full film
- Directed by: Gabriel Veyre
- Release date: 1896
- Running time: 1 minute
- Country: Mexico
- Language: Silent

Carga de rurales is an 1896 Mexican short black-and-white silent documentary film directed by Gabriel Veyre, who was born in France but is known mainly for his work in Mexico, Indochina and Morocco. The film is public domain worldwide due to its age.

== See also ==
- List of Mexican films of the 1890s
