= List of 2009 box office number-one films in Mexico =

This is a list of films which have placed number one at the weekend box office in Mexico during 2009.

== Number-one films ==
#	Date	Film	Gross (USD)	Openings in the top ten
1	January 4, 2009	Bedtime Stories	$2,421,651	
2	January 11, 2009	Bedtime Stories	$1,421,902	Seven Pounds (#2), The Flock (#9)
3	January 18, 2009	The Curious Case of Benjamin Button	$1,410,087	Marley & Me (#3), The Argentine (#8)
4	January 25, 2009	The Curious Case of Benjamin Button	$1,347,802	Hotel for Dogs (#2), My Best Friend's Girl (#6), The Spirit (#9)
5	February 1, 2009	Yes Man	$1,345,462	Inkheart (#2), Bride Wars (#3), Revolutionary Road (#8), Quarantine (#10)
6	February 8, 2009	Coraline	$1,198,984	Underworld: Rise of the Lycans (#3), Righteous Kill (#8), Big Stan (#9)
7	February 15, 2009	Valkyrie	$1,440,752	My Bloody Valentine 3D (#3), El Agente 00-P2 (#6), Confessions of a Shopaholic (#7)
8	February 22, 2009	Valkyrie	$836,296	Slumdog Millionaire (#3), El Traspatio (#5), Doubt (#10)
9	March 1, 2009	Slumdog Millionaire	$783,030	The Pink Panther 2 (#2), Changeling (#5), Amar (#7)
10	March 8, 2009	Watchmen	$717,056	Jonas Brothers: The 3D Concert Experience (#4), He's Just Not That Into You (#5)
11	March 15, 2009	The Unborn	$1,292,182	Paul Blart: Mall Cop (#2)
12	March 22, 2009	Otra Película de Huevos y un Pollo	$2,225,866	The International (#5), Last Chance Harvey (#10)
13	March 29, 2009	Otra Película de Huevos y un Pollo	$1,404,352	Knowing (#2), Race to Witch Mountain (#3), Gran Torino (#6)
14	April 5, 2009	Fast & Furious	$3,543,145	Monsters vs. Aliens (#2), The Accidental Husband (#6), The Reader (#8)
15	April 12, 2009	Fast & Furious	$1,942,723	Dragonball Evolution (#3), Amar a Morir (#4), Duplicity (#5)
16	April 19, 2009	Fast & Furious	$1,094,532	The Haunting in Connecticut (#3), El Libro de Piedra (#10)
17	April 26, 2009	Fast & Furious	$435,849	Igor (#7), I Love You, Man (#10)
18	May 3, 2009	Theatres closed due to the Swine flu outbreak in Mexico		
19	May 10, 2009	The Haunting in Connecticut	$204,065	
20	May 17, 2009	Ghosts of Girlfriends Past	$912,056	Earth (#4), Push (#5), Sin Nombre (#7)
21	May 24, 2009	Angels & Demons	$4,186,265	Hannah Montana: The Movie (#2), The Last House on the Left (#8)
22	May 31, 2009	X-Men Origins: Wolverine	$3,971,362	
23	June 7, 2009	Up	$3,601,639	Star Trek (#4), State of Play (#5)
24	June 14, 2009	Night at the Museum: Battle of the Smithsonian	$3,243,766	While She Was Out (#9)
25	June 21, 2009	Night at the Museum: Battle of the Smithsonian	$1,875,307	The Proposal (#3), 17 Again (#4)
26	June 28, 2009	Transformers: Revenge of the Fallen	$5,110,423	My Sister's Keeper (#7)
27	July 5, 2009	Ice Age 3	$9,162,498	Public Enemies (#3)
28	July 12, 2009	Ice Age 3	$6,255,397	All Inclusive (#5), Thick as Thieves (#6)
29	July 19, 2009	Harry Potter and the Half-Blood Prince	$6,660,905	It's Alive (#9)
30	July 26, 2009	Harry Potter and the Half-Blood Prince	$2,653,327	The Uninvited (#3), Crossing Over (#6)
31	August 2, 2009	Terminator Salvation	$2,652,265	G-Force (#2)
32	August 9, 2009	G.I. Joe: The Rise of Cobra	$2,247,899	Shorts (#6), Enemigos Intimos (#9)
33	August 16, 2009	The Hangover	$1,379,008	Land of the Lost (#4), El Ratón Pérez 2 (#10)
34	August 23, 2009	The Hangover	$1,020,467	Drag Me to Hell (#2), The Time Traveler's Wife (#5), Imagine That (#7), Sólo Quiero Caminar (#8)
35	August 30, 2009	The Hangover	$1,006,200	Aliens in the Attic (#2), A Propósito de Alexa (#4), Defiance (#8)
36	September 6, 2009	The Ugly Truth	$903,379	Orphan (#2), Tinker Bell and the Lost Treasure (#3)
37	September 13, 2009	The Ugly Truth	$696,355	Dance Flick (#7), New in Town (#8)
38	September 20, 2009	Cloudy with a Chance of Meatballs	$1,493,922	
39	September 27, 2009	Cloudy with a Chance of Meatballs	$1,220,525	The Taking of Pelham (#2), Whiteout (#4), Spread (#7)
40	October 4, 2009	Surrogates	$864,247	Jennifer's Body (#4), La Véritable Histoire du Chat Botte (#5)
41	October 11, 2009	Inglourious Basterds	$943,820	The Final Destination (#2), Year One (#9), The Dolphin: Story of a Dreamer (#10)
42	October 18, 2009	Inglourious Basterds	$818,448	District 9 (#2)
43	October 25, 2009	Toy Story 3D	$905,458	9 (#2), REC 2 (#3)
44	November 1, 2009	Michael Jackson's This Is It	$1,010,828	Toy Story 2 3D (#2), Cirque du Freak: The Vampire's Assistant (#3), Gamer (#7), Halloween II (#9), Violanchelo (#10)
45	November 8, 2009	Disney's A Christmas Carol	$2,086,795	Couples Retreat (#3), Passengers (#8)
46	November 15, 2009	2012	$5,126,644	
47	November 22, 2009	The Twilight Saga: New Moon	$6,107,021	No-Do (#6)
48	November 29, 2009	The Twilight Saga: New Moon	$2,868,961	Planet 51 (#3), Old Dogs (#4), Morenita, el Escándalo (#6)
49	December 6, 2009	The Twilight Saga: New Moon	$1,377,084	Case 39 (#5)
50	December 13, 2009	The Princess and the Frog	$1,341,861	The Box (#7), The Stepfather (#9)
51	December 20, 2009	Avatar	$4,998,010	Nikté (#6)
52	December 27, 2009	Avatar	$5,222,003	Alvin and the Chipmunks 2 (#2), Paranormal Activity (#3), Everybody's Fine (#6)

== Highest-grossing films ==
Highest-grossing films of 2009
Rank	Title	Distributor	Gross (USD)
1.	Avatar	20th Century Fox	$47,455,575
2.	Ice Age 3	20th Century Fox	$39,389,248
3.	Harry Potter and the Half-Blood Prince	Warner Bros.	$21,185,512
4.	2012	Sony	$19,423,924
5.	Transformers: Revenge of the Fallen	Paramount	$18,895,683
6.	The Twilight Saga: New Moon	Corazón Films	$18,808,309
7.	Up	Disney	$14,173,033
8.	Angels & Demons	Sony	$13,379,208
9.	Fast & Furious	Universal	$13,210,004
10.	Monsters vs. Aliens	Paramount	$10,569,999

== Notes ==
- List of Mexican films — Mexican films by year

Preceded by 2008	Box office number-one films of Mexico; 2009	Succeeded by 2010
