= List of 2007 box office number-one films in Mexico =

This is a list of films which placed number one at the weekend box office for the year 2007.

== Number-one films ==
#	Date	Film	Gross (USD)	Openings in the top ten
1	January 11, 2007	Night at the Museum	$2,167,918	Stormbreaker (#7), Borat: Cultural Learnings of America for Make Benefit Glorious Nation of Kazakhstan (#9)
2	January 18, 2007	Rocky Balboa	$1,609,380	The Holiday (#3), Fuera del cielo (#4)
3	January 25, 2007	Perfume: The Story of a Murderer	$1,559,476	
4	February 1, 2007	Apocalypto	$2,365,480	Dreamgirls (#9)
5	February 8, 2007	Kilómetro 31	$1,508,862	The Pursuit of Happyness (#3)
6	February 15, 2007	Kilómetro 31	$1,468,895	Blood Diamond (#2), Employee of the Month (#8)
7	February 22, 2007	Ghost Rider	$2,050,782	Morirse en domingo (#7), Combien tu m'aimes? (#10)
8	March 1, 2007	Norbit	$1,246,087	Notes on a Scandal (#9)
9	March 8, 2007	Norbit	$773,988	Pathfinder: Legend of the Ghost Warrior (#5), Freedom Writers (#10)
10	March 15, 2007	Niñas Mal	$1,602,673	Music and Lyrics (#2), The Fountain (#8)
11	March 22, 2007	Epic Movie	$1,364,983	Arthur and the Invisibles (#5), The Good Shepherd (#6)
12	March 29, 2007	300	$2,585,419	
13	April 5, 2007	Meet the Robinsons	$1,877,402	Shooter (#3), Cuando las cosas suceden (#6), Alatriste (#8), The Hills Have Eyes 2 (#10)
14	April 12, 2007	Wild Hogs	$1,329,865	The Reaping (#2), Mr. Bean's Holiday (#4), TMNT (#6), Are We Done Yet? (#7), The Queen (#10)
15	April 15, 2007	Wild Hogs	$1,026,207	Goal! 2: Living the Dream... (#5), The Number 23 (#10)
16	April 22, 2007	Perfect Stranger	$940,938	Disturbia (#4), Happily N'Ever After (#6), Primeval (#10)
17	April 29, 2007	The Messengers	$674,664	
18	May 6, 2007	Spider-Man 3	$12,002,306	An American Haunting (#7)
19	May 13, 2007	Spider-Man 3	$6,118,161	The Invisible (#2), Blades of Glory (#4)
20	May 20, 2007	Spider-Man 3	$2,997,567	Premonition (#2)
21	May 27, 2007	Pirates of the Caribbean: At World's End	$8,868,597	
22	June 3, 2007	Pirates of the Caribbean: At World's End	$7,232,827	28 Weeks Later (#3), Zodiac (#5), My First Wedding (#8)
23	June 10, 2007	Pirates of the Caribbean: At World's End	$5,146,385	Fracture (#2)
24	June 17, 2007	Shrek the Third	$9,117,354	
25	June 24, 2007	Fantastic Four: Rise of the Silver Surfer	$5,676,476	
26	July 1, 2007	Fantastic Four: Rise of the Silver Surfer	$3,143,520	Ocean's Thirteen (#3)
27	July 8, 2007	Ratatouille	$4,607,814	Live Free or Die Hard (#2), Griffin & Phoenix (#9)
28	July 15, 2007	Harry Potter and the Order of the Phoenix	$7,852,698	White Noise 2: The Light (#7),
29	July 22, 2007	Transformers	$5,457,346	Lonely Hearts (#10)
30	July 29, 2007	Transformers	$3,048,772	No Reservations (#4), Whisper (#6), La Niña en la piedra (#8), Hostel Part II (#9)
31	August 5, 2007	The Simpsons Movie	$5,457,104	Evan Almighty (#2), Alpha Dog (#9)
32	August 12, 2007	The Simpsons Movie	$1,951,146	Surf's Up (#2), License to Wed (#3), Hairspray (#6), Mr. Brooks (#7)
33	August 19, 2007	The Simpsons Movie	$883,439	Next (#3), El Búfalo de la Noche (#5), Vacancy (#7)
34	August 26, 2007	Surf's Up	$620,760	Knocked Up (#5), Breach (#6)
35	September 2, 2007	Rush Hour 3	$1,056,839	
36	September 9, 2007	The Bourne Ultimatum	$1,452,371	Stardust (#2)
37	September 16, 2007	Stardust	$790,715	Bratz (#5)
38	September 23, 2007	Resident Evil: Extinction	$2,151,235	Underdog (#2)
39	September 30, 2007	I Now Pronounce You Chuck and Larry	$1,249,268	The Invasion (#4)
40	October 7, 2007	I Now Pronounce You Chuck and Larry	$986,395	Superbad (#5), Catacombs (#8), A Mighty Heart (#9)
41	October 14, 2007	The Game Plan	$1,915,281	The Brave One (#2), Bad Habits (#5)
42	October 21, 2007	The Game Plan	$1,308,059	The Seeker: The Dark Is Rising (#2), Hasta el viento tiene miedo (#3), Michael Clayton (#9), 3:10 to Yuma (#10)
43	October 28, 2007	The Game Plan	$905,474	1408 (#2), Because I Said So (#5), The Kingdom (#8), Saw IV (#10)
44	November 4, 2007	La Leyenda de la Nahuala	$1,479,685	The Heartbreak Kid (#2), Halloween (#7)
45	November 11, 2007	Bridge to Terabithia	$958,958	Lions for Lambs (#3), Cascia (#10)
46	November 18, 2007	Bridge to Terabithia	$798,273	Hannibal Rising (#6), Fraude: México 2006 (#7), Good Luck Chuck (#9)
47	November 25, 2007	Beowulf	$1,931,957	Dead Silence (#6), Rendition (#7)
48	December 2, 2007	Bee Movie	$2,600,799	Hitman (#3), 30 Days of Night (#4)
49	December 9, 2007	Bee Movie	$1,624,652	Fred Claus (#2)
50	December 16, 2007	Enchanted	$2,761,545	The Golden Compass (#2), P2 (#7)
51	December 23, 2007	Alvin and the Chipmunks	$1,651,829	Sultanes del Sur (#4)
52	December 30, 2007	National Treasure: Book of Secrets	$2,397,296	The Water Horse: Legend of the Deep (#5), Love in the Time of Cholera (#6), Things We Lost in the Fire (#8)

== Highest-grossing films ==
Highest-grossing films of 2007
Rank	Title	Distributor	Gross (USD)
1.	Spider-Man 3	Sony	$36,846,766
2.	Harry Potter and the Order of the Phoenix	Warner Bros.	$24,736,826
3.	Pirates of the Caribbean: At World's End	Disney	$24,332,139
4.	Shrek the Third	Paramount	$24,122,638
5.	Transformers	Paramount	$17,976,243
6.	Fantastic Four: Rise of the Silver Surfer	20th Century Fox	$16,560,372
7.	Ratatouille	Disney	$16,103,100
8.	The Simpsons Movie	20th Century Fox	$15,295,868
9.	Enchanted	Disney	$13,195,233
10.	Alvin and the Chipmunks	20th Century Fox	$11,697,418

Preceded by 2006	2007	Succeeded by 2008
