= Rumbos paralelos =

- Directed by: Rafael Montero
- Written by: Sharon Kleinberg
- Starring: Ludwika Paleta; Iliana Fox
- Cinematography: Erwin Jaquez
- Edited by: Oscar Figueroa
- Music by: Diego Westendarp
- Release date: 20 May 2016
- Running time: 90 min
- Country: Mexico
- Language: Spanish

Rumbos paralelos is a Mexican drama film written by Sharon Kleinberg and directed by Rafael Montero. The film is starring Ludwika Paleta and Iliana Fox. It premiered on May 20, 2016 in Mexico.

== Plot ==
Film tells the story of Gaby and Silvia, who had their children the same day and in the same hospital. Without having any contact with each other, they raised their own in different contexts and according to their respective possibilities, taking into account that the first is a single mother by choice, while the other is married and also has a daughter. Thus, everything happens normally, until due to the illness of one of the children, they discover that moments after birth, they were exchanged by accident and, in fact, each has the child of the other. The complicated situation will not only lead to an emotional and moral crossroads, but will result in a complicated legal dispute.

== Cast ==
- Ludwika Paleta as Gaby
- Iliana Fox as Silvia
- Michel Brown as Armando
- Juan Ignacio Aranda as Hospital Director
- Arturo Barba as Franccesco
- Fernanda Castillo as Adriana
- Pilar Ixquic Mata as Lawyer
- Sharon Kleinberg as Kind nurse
- Juan Ríos Cantú as Graduate Huerta
