= List of 2010 box office number-one films in Mexico =

This is a list of films which have placed number one at the weekend box office in Mexico during 2010.

== Number-one films ==
#	Date	Film	Gross (USD)	Openings in the top ten
1	January 3, 2010	Avatar	$4,238,014	Sherlock Holmes (#2), All About Steve (#6)
2	January 10, 2010	Avatar	$2,779,199	Law Abiding Citizen (#5), Zombieland (#6), Labor Pains (#8)
3	January 17, 2010	Avatar	$2,187,381	Tooth Fairy (#2), Did You Hear About the Morgans? (#5), Fame (#10)
4	January 24, 2010	Avatar	$1,663,426	Up in the Air (#4), The Fourth Kind (#5), Invictus (#6)
5	January 31, 2010	Avatar	$1,563,033	The Book of Eli (#3), It's Complicated (#4), Astro Boy (#9)
6	February 7, 2010	Avatar	$1,602,102	When in Rome (#8)
7	February 14, 2010	The Wolfman	$3,506,874	Percy Jackson & the Olympians: The Lightning Thief (#2), Valentine's Day (#3), The Hurt Locker (#8)
8	February 21, 2010	The Wolfman	$2,011,764	The Lovely Bones (#3), Daybreakers (#6)
9	February 28, 2010	The Wolfman	$1,124,363	Edge of Darkness (#2), Messengers 2: The Scarecrow (#7), Love Happens (#8), Nine (#10)
10	March 7, 2010	Alice in Wonderland	$7,620,403	Precious (#8)
11	March 14, 2010	Alice in Wonderland	$5,921,282	Shutter Island (#2), Extraordinary Measures (#8)
12	March 21, 2010	Alice in Wonderland	$3,083,139	The Blind Side (#2), Legion (#4), The Spy Next Door (#5)
13	March 28, 2010	How to Train Your Dragon	$2,791,749	The Bounty Hunter (#3), Remember Me (#6)
14	April 4, 2010	How to Train Your Dragon	$2,253,847	The Perfect Game (#3), Nanny McPhee and the Big Bang (#6), Dear John (#8), Outlander (#9)
15	April 11, 2010	How to Train Your Dragon	$1,766,037	Date Night (#2), Hachiko: A Dog's Story (#4)
16	April 18, 2010	Clash of the Titans	$7,177,135	The Echo (#8), The Last Song (#10)
17	April 25, 2010	Clash of the Titans	$3,630,198	The Back-Up Plan (#2), Cop Out (#4), Green Zone (#5)
18	May 2, 2010	Iron Man 2	$7,760,229	The Crazies (#5), The Road (#10)
19	May 9, 2010	Iron Man 2	$2,726,874	She's Out of My League (#4)
20	May 16, 2010	Robin Hood	$2,961,347	A Nightmare on Elm Street (#3)
21	May 23, 2010	Robin Hood	$1,931,951	Letters to Juliet (#5), To Paris with Love (#6), Oceans (#9), The Losers (#10)
22	May 30, 2010	Prince of Persia: The Sands of Time	$4,365,549	Marmaduke (#2), Abel (#6)
23	June 6, 2010	Prince of Persia: The Sands of Time	$2,703,969	Sex and the City 2 (#2), Furry Vengeance (#4), Frozen (#10)
24	June 13, 2010	Prince of Persia: The Sands of Time	$1,154,666	The A-Team (#2), Brothers (#8)
25	June 20, 2010	Toy Story 3	$15,088,275	Killers (#3), Kick-Ass (#7)
26	June 27, 2010	Toy Story 3	$9,589,449	The Grudge 3 (#4), Celda 211 (#7)
27	July 4, 2010	The Twilight Saga: Eclipse	$6,615,500	Chloe (#6)
28	July 11, 2010	The Karate Kid	$3,528,389	
29	July 18, 2010	Shrek Forever After	$8,825,235	Knight & Day (#4)
30	July 25, 2010	Shrek Forever After	$4,795,959	Grown Ups (#2), Burning Plains (#8)
31	August 1, 2010	Despicable Me	$4,103,380	The Sorcerer's Apprentice (#2), Inception (#4)
32	August 8, 2010	Despicable Me	$2,940,145	Salt (#3), Dorian Gray (#8)
33	August 15, 2010	Despicable Me	$2,240,029	Cats & Dogs: The Revenge of Kitty Galore (#2), The Expendables (#4), Solomon Kane (#9), The Girl with the Dragon Tattoo (#10)
34	August 22, 2010	Despicable Me	$1,523,091	Predators (#2), The Joneses (#9)
35	August 29, 2010	The Last Airbender	$4,248,230	No Eres Tú, Soy Yo (#2), El Atentado (#8)
36	September 5, 2010	The Last Airbender	$2,621,187	Vampires Suck (#3), El Infierno (#4), Tinker Bell and the Great Fairy Rescue (#5), The Switch (#6)
37	September 12, 2010	The Last Airbender	$1,591,732	The Ghost Writer (#9), Beyond a Reasonable Doubt (#10)
38	September 19, 2010	Resident Evil: Afterlife	$3,230,020	Hidalgo (#2), Going the Distance (#6), Brijes 3D (#7)
39	September 26, 2010	Resident Evil: Afterlife	$1,713,534	Eat, Pray, Love (#5), Héroes Verdaderos (#8)
40	October 3, 2010	Resident Evil: Afterlife	$1,271,105	Wall Street: Money Never Sleeps (#2), Charlie St. Cloud (#7)
41	October 10, 2010	Legend of the Guardians: The Owls of Ga'Hoole	$1,723,742	
42	October 17, 2010	Legend of the Guardians: The Owls of Ga'Hoole	$1,274,283	Life as We Know It (#2), The Last Exorcism (#3), Avatar: Special Edition (#4), Dinner for Schmucks (#10)
43	October 24, 2010	Paranormal Activity 2	$1,844,285	Biutiful (#3)
44	October 31, 2010	Paranormal Activity 2	$1,567,758	Sammy's Adventures: The Secret Passage (#2), The Town (#3), Saw 3D (#6), Te Presento a Laura (#7), Open Season 3 (#9)
45	November 7, 2010	Due Date	$1,268,404	RED (#4), Back to the Future: 25th Anniversary (#6), Sin Ella (#9)
46	November 14, 2010	Due Date	$921,418	Buried (#5), Machete (#7), Jackass 3D (#8)
47	November 21, 2010	Harry Potter and the Deathly Hallows – Part 1	$7,916,490	
48	November 28, 2010	Harry Potter and the Deathly Hallows – Part 1	$3,510,682	Tangled (#2), Devil (#3), Skyline (#4), Cyrus (#10)
49	December 5, 2010	The Chronicles of Narnia: The Voyage of the Dawn Treader (3D Preview)	$2,478,926	The American (#7)
50	December 12, 2010	The Chronicles of Narnia: The Voyage of the Dawn Treader	$3,411,150	The Social Network (#4), Nowhere Boy (#8), The Greatest (#10)
51	December 19, 2010	Megamind	$2,490,886	Marcelino Pan y Vino (#7), The Killer Inside Me (#10)
52	December 26, 2010	Tron: Legacy	$2,864,508	Gulliver's Travels (#2)
53	January 2, 2011	Tron: Legacy	$2,084,555	Little Fockers (#2), The Next Three Days (#7)

== Highest-grossing films ==
Highest-grossing films of 2010
Rank	Title	Distributor	Gross (USD)
1.	Toy Story 3	Disney	$59,382,044
2.	Alice in Wonderland	Disney	$31,347,734
3.	Shrek Forever After	Paramount	$28,384,310
4.	Harry Potter and the Deathly Hallows – Part 1	Warner Bros.	$22,839,997
5.	The Twilight Saga: Eclipse	Corazón Films	$20,600,163
6.	Clash of the Titans	Warner Bros.	$20,547,663
7.	Despicable Me	Universal	$19,789,795
8.	Iron Man 2	Paramount	$18,396,680
9.	The Chronicles of Narnia: The Voyage of the Dawn Treader	20th Century Fox	$16,749,459
10.	How to Train Your Dragon	Paramount	$14,362,388

== See also ==
- List of Mexican films — Mexican films by year

Preceded by 2009	Box office number-one films of Mexico; 2010	Succeeded by 2011
