= La fiscal de hierro =

Mexican telenovela

- Genre: Telenovela
- Written by: Rosa Clemente; Raúl Prieto; Connie Acosta; Daniel Yepes; Jorge Ribbon; María Alejandra Escobar
- Story by: Andrés López; Juan Camilo Ferrand
- Directed by: Moisés Ortíz Urquidi; Juancho Cardona; Jorge Eduardo Ramírez
- Starring: Iliana Fox; Carlos Ferro; Raúl Méndez; Christian Tappán; Alejandro Camacho
- Country of origin: Mexico
- Original language: Spanish
- No. of seasons: 1
- No. of episodes: 80

Production
- Executive producers: Manolo Cardona; Ana Cecilia Urquidi; Joshua Mintz
- Producers: Gabriel Heads; Jorge Sosa; Mónica Skorlich; Erica Sánchez
- Cinematography: Yasmín García Aranda
- Editors: Fernando Rodríguez; Rigel Sosa
- Camera setup: Multi-camera
- Production companies: 11:11 Films & TV; TV Azteca

Original release
- Network: Azteca Trece
- Release: January 30 – May 19, 2017

La fiscal de hierro is a Mexican telenovela produced by Manolo Cardona and Ana Cecilia Urquidi for Azteca Trece. The story is based on an original idea by Andrés Lópe and Juan Camilo Ferrand and written by Rosa Clemente and Raúl Prieto. It premiere on January 30, 2017.

The series is starring Iliana Fox as Silvana, Carlos Ferro as Joaquín, Raúl Méndez as Ernesto, Christian Tappán as Francisco and Alejandro Camacho as Diego.

The first season of the series was made available on Netflix on July 18, 2017.

== Plot ==
The series follows in the footsteps of Silvana Durán, a woman who has sworn to capture the man she is responsible for the death of her father Diego Trujillo, one of the most dangerous drug lords in the country.

== Cast ==
=== Main ===
- Iliana Fox as Silvana Durán
- Carlos Ferro as Joaquín Muñoz
- Raúl Méndez as Ernesto Padilla
- Christian Tappán as Francisco Miranda
- Alejandro Camacho as Diego Trujillo

=== Recurring ===
- Álvaro Guerrero as Humberto Zúñiga
- José Carlos Rodríguez as Jorge Guevara
- Rocío Verdejo as Camila Saldarreaga
- Estefanía Hinojosa as Candela Miranda
- Ruy Senderos as Argemiro Durán
- Laura Palma as Violeta
- Tania López as Érika Sánchez
- Fabián Peña as Roberto Gutiérrez
- Jessica Mas as Fabiana
- Matías del Castillo as Felipe
- Quetzalli Cortés as Fabio
- Alberto Agnesi
- Eligio Meléndez
- Rodrigo Oviedo
- Claudia Lobo
- Enrique Singer
- Julio Casado
- Fabián Corres
- Néstor Rodulfo
