= List of Mexican films of 2005 =

This is a list of Mexican films released in 2005.

== 2005 ==
Title	Director	Cast	Genre	Notes
2005
Al otro lado	Gustavo Loza	Héctor Suárez, Vanessa Bauche, Adrian Alonso		
Así	Jesús Mario Lozano			
Attacks from the Future: Rinoplasticos Ataques Del Futuro: Rinoplasticos	Pauli Janhunen Calderon		Speculative fiction	
Batalla en el cielo	Carlos Reygadas			Entered into the 2005 Cannes Film Festival
El Violin	Francisco Vargas			Screened at the 2006 Cannes Film Festival
La mujer de mi hermano	Ricardo de Montreuil	Bárbara Mori, Christian Meier, Manolo Cardona		
Tijuana Makes Me Happy	Dylan Verrechia			
American Visa	Juan C. Valdivia	Demián Bichir, Kate del Castillo		
Sangre	Amat Escalante			Screened at the 2005 Cannes Film Festival
Siete Días	Fernando Kalife	Jaime Camil, Martha Higareda, Eduardo Arroyuelo		
