= List of Mexican films of the 1890s =

This is a list of the earliest films produced in the Cinema of Mexico ordered by year of release from 1896 to 1899. For an alphabetical list of articles on Mexican films see Category:Mexican films.

Title	Director	Cast	Genre	Notes
1896
Comitiva presidencial del 16 de septiembre	Gabriel Veyre	Porfirio Díaz	Documentary	
Grupo en movimiento del general Díaz y de su familia	Gabriel Veyre	Porfirio Díaz	Documentary	
El Presidente de la república con sus ministros el 16 de septiembre en el castillo de Chapultepec	Gabriel Veyre, Claude Ferdinand Von Bernard	Porfirio Díaz	Documentary	
Presidente de la república en carruaje regresando a Chapultepec	Gabriel Veyre	Porfirio Díaz	Documentary	
El Presidente de la república entrando a pie al castillo de Chapultepec	Gabriel Veyre	Porfirio Díaz	Documentary	
El Presidente de la república entrando en coche al castillo de Chapultepec	Gabriel Veyre	Porfirio Díaz	Documentary	
El Presidente de la república paseando a caballo en el bosque de Chapultepec	Gabriel Veyre	Porfirio Díaz	Documentary	
El Presidente de la república recorriendo la plaza de la constitución el 16 de septiembre	Gabriel Veyre	Porfirio Díaz	Documentary	
Presidente de la república subiendo a pie del castillo de Chapultepec	Gabriel Veyre, Claude Ferdinand Von Bernard	Porfirio Díaz	Documentary	
Señorita Andrea	Gabriel Veyre		Documentary	
Proceso del soldado Antonio Navarro	Gabriel Veyre		Documentary	
Manganeo	Gabriel Veyre		Documentary	
Llegada de la campana historica del 16 de septiembre	Gabriel Veyre		Documentary	
Lazamiento de un novillo	Gabriel Veyre		Documentary	
Lazamiento de un buey salvaje	Gabriel Veyre		Documentary	
Grupo de indios al pie del arbol de la noche triste	Gabriel Veyre		Documentary	
Escena en los baños pane	Gabriel Veyre		Documentary	
Elección de yuntas	Gabriel Veyre		Documentary	
Un Duelo a pistola en el bosque de Chapultepec	Gabriel Veyre		Documentary	
Desfile de rurales al galope el 16 de septiembre	Gabriel Veyre		Documentary	
Desayuno de indios	Gabriel Veyre		Documentary	
Clase de gimnasia en el colegio de la paz	Gabriel Veyre		Documentary	
Carmen Romero Rubio de Díaz y familiares en carruaje en el paseo de la reforma	Gabriel Veyre		Documentary	
Carga de rurales	Gabriel Veyre		Documentary	
Baile de la romeria Española en el Tivoli del eliseo	Gabriel Veyre		Documentary	
El Amansador	Gabriel Veyre		Documentary	
Alumnos de Chapultepec con la esgrima del fusil	Gabriel Veyre		Documentary	
El Canal de la viga en Santa Anita	Gabriel Veyre		Documentary	
Lazamiento de un caballo salvaje	Gabriel Veyre		Documentary	
Jarabe tapatío	Gabriel Veyre		Documentary	
Alumnos de Chapultepec desfilando	Gabriel Veyre		Documentary	
Pelea de gallos	Gabriel Veyre		Documentary	
Baño de caballos	Gabriel Veyre		Documentary	
1897
Ejercicios militares de los cadetes de la academia mexicana	Gabriel Veyre		Documentary	
Llegada del presidente Díaz a su palacio de Chapultepec	Enrique Moulinie	Porfirio Díaz	Documentary	
Presidente de la república despidiendose de sus ministros para tomar un carruaje	Gabriel Veyre	Porfirio Díaz	Documentary	
Verbena del Carmen en la ciudad de Puebla	Enrique Moulinie, Enrique Churrich		Documentary	
Corrida entera de toros por la cuadrilla de Ponciano Perez	Enrique Churrich		Documentary	
Pelea de gallos en Guadalajara	Enrique Churrich		Documentary	
1898
Norte en Veracruz	Gabriel Veyre		Documentary	
Corrida de toros en Tacubaya	Salvador Toscano		Documentary	
Dos canarios de cáfe	Salvador Toscano	Luisa Obregón	Drama	
Don Juan Tenorio	Salvador Toscano		Drama	First fictional feature
Escenas en la Alameda	Salvador Toscano		Documentary	
Ejercicios a la bayoneta por los alumnos del colegio militar de Chapultepec	Gabriel Veyre		Documentary	
Canal de la viga, Puente de Jamaica	Gabriel Veyre		Documentary	
Charros mexicanos lanzando un potro	Salvador Toscano		Documentary	
Pelea de gallos	Salvador Toscano		Documentary	
Corrida de toros en Guerrita	Salvador Toscano		Documentary	
Llegada del Tlacotalpan a Veracruz	Salvador Toscano		Documentary	
La Alameda	Salvador Toscano		Documentary	
El Zocalo	Salvador Toscano		Documentary	
Corrida de toros en las plazas mexicanas	Salvador Toscano		Documentary	
Gavilanes aplastado por una aplanadora	Salvador Toscano	Francisco Gavilanes	Documentary	
1899
Presidente de la república despidiendose de los secretarios de estado en Chapultepec	Salvador Toscano	Porfirio Díaz	Documentary	
Ascención en globo de Don Joaquin de la Cantolla y Rico	Salvador Toscano		Documentary	
Escenas entre los bastidores del teatro nacional en Mexico	Salvador Toscano		Documentary	
El Prestidigitador Mongrand	Salvador Toscano		Documentary	
Terrible percance a un enamorado en el cementerio de Dolores	Salvador Toscano		Documentary	
Sevillanas	Salvador Toscano	Rosario Soler	Drama	
Paseo en la Alameda de México, domingo de mediodía	Salvador Toscano		Documentary	
Jarabe tapatío	Salvador Toscano		Documentary	
Entrada de un vapor al puerto de Veracruz	Salvador Toscano		Documentary	
Baño de caballos en la hacienda de Atequiza	Salvador Toscano		Documentary	
El Presidente general Porfirio Díaz y sus ministros	Carlos Mongrand	Porfirio Díaz	Documentary	
Entrada de una boda a una iglesia	Carlos Mongrand		Documentary	
Salida de empleados de una fabrica	Carlos Mongrand		Documentary	
5 vistas de las maniobras militares en San Lazaro el 14 de abril	Guillermo Becerril		Documentary	
Caballos en el hipodromo	Guillermo Becerril	Porfirio Díaz	Documentary	
Desfile del cuerpo de bomberos el 15 de septiembre	Guillermo Becerril	Porfirio Díaz	Documentary	
Defensa de la bandera	Guillermo Becerril	Porfirio Díaz	Documentary	
Llegada del ilustrisimo señor Arzobispo a la ciudad de mexico	Guillermo Becerril	Porfirio Díaz	Documentary	
Paseo en Santa Anita	Guillermo Becerril	Porfirio Díaz	Documentary	
Paseo en Santa Anita	Guillermo Becerril	Porfirio Díaz	Documentary	
