= Rosario Soler =

Spanish actress and singer (1879–1944)

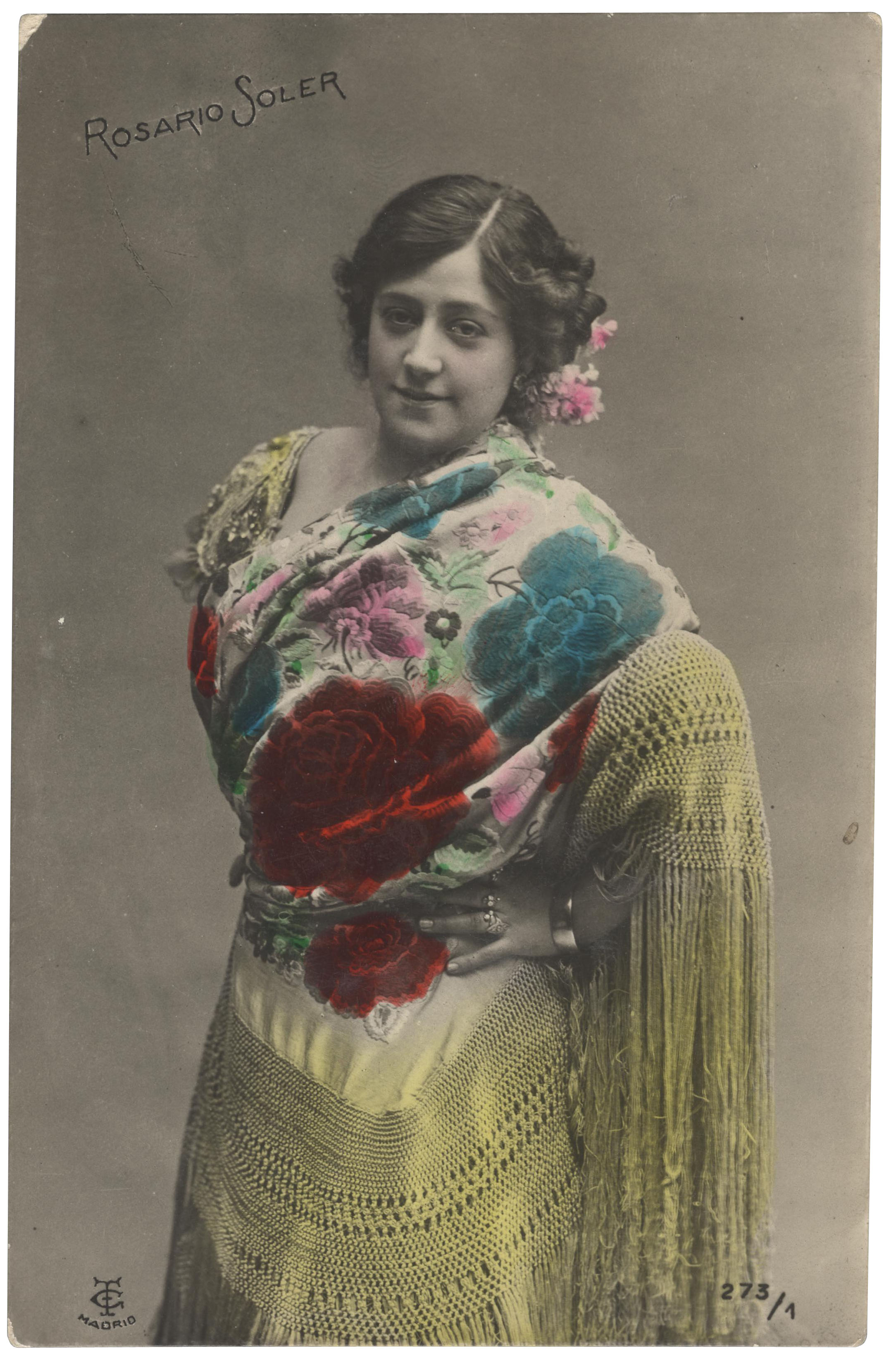
- Soler in 1906
- Born: Rosario Illescas Sánchez; 16 August 1879; Málaga, Andalusia, Spain
- Died: 22 November 1944 (aged 65)
- Occupations: Actress; singer
- Years active: 1896–1920s
- Style: Opera; zarzuela; operetta

Rosario Soler (born Rosario Illescas Sánchez; 16 August 1879 – 22 November 1944) was a Spanish actress and singer. She was nicknamed "La Patita".

== Biography ==
Soler was born in Málaga on 16 August 1879 in the neighborhood of Victoria. She began her career at the Teatro Vital Aza Málaga from an early age. At age 16, she moved to Madrid to perform in small theaters and debuted at the Príncipe Alfonso in 1896. The same year, she traveled to Mexico and triumphed in the Teatro Principal with La Marcha de Cádiz, where she got the nickname "La Patita". After performing at the Payret Teatro, passing through Havana, Cuba, in 1901, she left for Milan, Italy, to study singing. She returned to Spain in 1903, where she began her stage career performing at Tivoli, el Eslava, Novedades, Vital Aza and Teatro de la Zarzuela, highlighting interpretations of Mozo Crúo and La revoltosa, among others. In 1907, at the Apollo, she performed the zarzuela, Las Bribonas. In 1910, a few months before ending her season at the Apollo, she resigned and left the Gran Teatro. In September of the same year, she moved to Mexico, premiering two works by the Calleja.

Soler was nicknamed "La Patita" because of the song she sings in La Marcha de Cadiz. She was described by the Spanish adjective simpatica, and the English word "magnetic". She possessed a delicate beauty and charm and a voice of light timbre, which, while very pleasant, gave a suggestion of an imperfect training. She sang chula (pretty, but of the people) parts, and all other parts she invested with her personality. Her was praised for her portrayal of a rollicking young officer, a breeches role, in Manuel Fernández Caballero's zarzuela La viejecita, who, spurned and jeered by his fellows for not having received an invitation to a ball, masquerades as a demure little old lady to gain admission to the house, and woos, and wins the hand of a count's daughter. The intensity, dash and delicacy of her acting, together with her rendering of the music, to which her voice is particularly fitted, were entertaining. With Los Cocineros, Soler is most closely identified. The final waltz which she sang, accompanied by a chorus costumed as cooks and beating time on skillets, was widely popular throughout Mexico City. After ten years between Mexico, New York City, and Havana, she returned to Madrid in 1923 with a masterful interpretation of the operetta El niño judío in the Price theater.

She retired in Nice, France. In 1931, she returned to Málaga, where she died on 22 November 1944.

== Bibliography ==
- Brown, Thomas (October 1899). "The Stage in Mexico and its Favorites". The Cosmopolitan. Vol. 27, no. 6. Schlicht & Field. pp. 605–611.
- Rosario Soler. Una zarzuela en cuadros disolventes. Roberto Carril Bustamante. Ediciones Cumbres, 2015.
