= Fernando Becerril =

Mexican actor (1944-2023)

- Born: 1944/1945; San Luis Potosí, Mexico
- Died: 7 February 2023 (aged 78)
- Occupation: Actor
- Years active: 1990–2023

Fernando Becerril (1944/1945 – 7 February 2023) was a Mexican actor. He appeared in numerous Spanish-language films since 1998, including El crimen del padre Amaro (2002), Tlatelolco, verano del 68 (2013) and The Legend of Zorro (2005).

== Life ==
Becerril was born in San Luis Potosí and grew up in Cuernavaca, Morelos, where he realized his passion for being on stage as part of a choir. At the age of 15, he began acting in Mexico City, Preparatory 5 "José Vasconcelos". He entered the then School of Fine Arts Theatre, where he formally began his studies. At the age of 25 he applied for and obtained a scholarship from the government of France to study acting there.

He lived in Paris for more than 20 years. In 1995, he decided to return to Mexico to act in a film, hired as a French talent. Although his career in Europe was successful, he stayed in Mexico, because of nostalgia of returning to his homeland and because he did different castings and obtained the characters he wanted. After the age of 50, he dedicated himself to theater, his passion, but also cinema and television. Becerril was convinced that Mexico had talent and quality for cinema to succeed internationally, however, there was little "protection" for producers and actors, in addition to the habitual preference of American cinema.

Becerril's cause of death remained unknown. The artistic guild lamented his death. Among the first to share their condolences were Joaquín Cosío, Horacio Villalobos, José María Yazpik, Ignacio Riva Palacio, Darío Ripoll and Eduardo España.

== Work ==
His work to promote theater was reflected in the dozens of productions in which he participated and in those he collaborated on the production, including Un plato difícil, El mercader de Venecia, La comedia de las equivocaciones, and Sueño de una noche de verano, among others.

Becerril appeared in the following theatrical and television films:

=== Film ===
Year	Title	Role	Notes
1961	Un plato difficil		
1998	The Mask of Zorro	Don Sergio	
1999	Ravenous	Mexican commander	
2002	The Crime of Padre Amaro	Galarza	
2004	Zapata: El sueño de un héroe	Presidente Francisco Madero	
2004	El día menos pensado	Julián	
2005	The Legend of Zorro	Don Diaz	
2007	Never On A Sunday	N/A	
2007	The Year of the Nail (Año uña)	N/A	
2007	Espérame en otro mundo	Nacho	
2007	Kilometer 31	Doctor	
2007	La Zona	De La Garza	
2009	Caja Negra	Narrator	
2010	El Atentado (The Attempt Dossier)	Alcaide Campuzano	Editor
2010	180°	N/A	
2012	Get the Gringo	Prison Director	
2012	Mariachi Gringo	Alberto	
2015	The Thin Yellow Line (La delgada línea amarilla)	Ingeniero	
2015	The Similars	Martin	
2017	El Habitante	Cardenal Pedro Natale	
2020	Dance of the 41 (El baile de los 41)	Porfirio Díaz	
2021	La venganza de las Juanas	Rogelio Marroquin	

=== Television ===
Year	Title	Role	Notes
1999	Háblame de amor	Alonso Barragan	
2001	Amores querer con alevosía	Guillermo Herreros	
2002	Fidel	Carlos	
2002	Por ti	Arturo	
2002	In the Time of the Butterflies	Enrique Mirabal	
2004	And Starring Pancho Villa as Himself	Priest	
2009	Eternamente tuya		
2010	La loba	Luis Fernandez "Don Luis"	
2010	Drenaje Profundo	Milosz, evil scientist	
2010	Quererte así	Ramón Romero	
2021	La Venganza de las Juanas	Rogelio Marroquín	
