= List of Mexican films of the 1900s =

A List of Mexican films of the 1900s, ordered by year of release.

Title	Director	Cast	Genre	Notes
1900
Visita del General Díaz a Puebla	Guillermo Becerril	Porfirio Díaz	Documentary	
Saliendo de la catedral de Puebla	Salvador Toscano	Rosario Soler	Documentary	
Suerte de toros ejecutados por Antonio Fuentesa	Carlos Mongrand		Documentary	
Jardin de la unión de Guanajuato	Carlos Mongrand		Documentary	
Jardin del cantador de Guanajuato	Carlos Mongrand		Documentary	
Retrato del general Mucio Martinez	Carlos Mongrand		Documentary	
Bailes por la señora Soler	Carlos Mongrand		Documentary	
Vistas de Veracruz	Carlos Mongrand		Documentary	
Zocalo de Puebla en la mañana de un domingo	Guillermo Becerril		Documentary	
Baile familiar	Guillermo Becerril		Documentary	
La Bailarina Rosita Tejeda	Guillermo Becerril		Documentary	
Carpinteros en el taller	Guillermo Becerril		Documentary	
Corrida de Fuentes y minuto en México	Guillermo Becerril		Documentary	
Desfile de carros alegoricos	Guillermo Becerril		Documentary	
Dos companias del septimo batallon	Guillermo Becerril		Documentary	
En las chinampas	Guillermo Becerril		Documentary	
Pasaje en un tren	Guillermo Becerril		Documentary	
Riña en una canoa	Guillermo Becerril		Documentary	
Segadores en el campo	Guillermo Becerril		Documentary	
Fiestas presidenciales en Puebla	Guillermo Becerril		Documentary	
Inauguración del panteon frances	Guillermo Becerril		Documentary	
Paseo en la alameda	Guillermo Becerril		Documentary	
Vistas de Tenango del Valle	Guillermo Becerril		Documentary	
1901
Vista del 15 batallón	Carlos Mongrand		Documentary	
Los Bufos de Coyutlan	Guillermo Becerril		Documentary	
Corrida de toros	Guillermo Becerril		Documentary	
1902
Señor general Díaz y su esposa paseando a caballo en el bosque de Chapultepec	Carlos Mongrand	Porfirio Díaz	Documentary	
1903
Los Charros mexicanos	Carlos Mongrand		Documentary	
Coronel Ahumada llegando en su coche al palacio de gobierno de Guadalajara	Carlos Mongrand		Documentary	
Paseo del general Díaz en Chapultepec	Guillermo Becerril	Porfirio Díaz	Documentary	
Time Is Money	Carlos Mongrand		Comedy	Also known as Elocuentisima lección para dormilones
Jarabe tapatío	Guillermo Becerril		Documentary	
Salida de la misa de las doce en Orizaba	Guillermo Becerril		Documentary	
Desfile de las tropas mexicanas en México	Guillermo Becerril		Documentary	
El Carnaval de Mazatlan	Guillermo Becerril		Documentary	
Aventuras del sexteto Uranga	Enrique Rosas		Documentary	
1904
Señorita Soler y la pareja Obregón en uno de sus mejores bailes	Salvador Toscano	Rosario Soler	Documentary	
Fiestas del 16 de septiembre en Tehuacan	Salvador Toscano		Documentary	
Calle Teatro e Iglesia en Saltillo	Salvador Toscano		Documentary	
Cuauhtemoc y Benito Juarez	Carlos Mongrand		Drama	
De Guadalupe a Zacatecas en un tren de marcha	Carlos Mongrand		Documentary	
Hernan Cortes, Hidalgo y Morelos	Carlos Mongrand		Drama	
Plaza de armas de Chihuahua	Carlos Mongrand		Documentary	
Vistas de Orizaba y sus alrededores	Enrique Rosas		Documentary	
La Cerveceria Moctezuma de Orizaba	Enrique Rosas		Documentary	
Salida de misa de las 12 de la parroquia de Orizaba	Enrique Rosas		Documentary	
1905
Ceremonia al pie del monumento del martir de la patria, Melchor Ocampo en Morelia	Carlos Mongrand		Documentary	
Luis Terrazas y Enrique C. Creel gobernadores constitucional e interino de Chihuahua	Carlos Mongrand		Documentary	
La Inundación de Guanajuato	Salvador Toscano		Documentary	
Paseo en coche por la plaza principal, calle de San Francisco y calle del palacio de gobierno de Guadalajara	Carlos Mongrand		Documentary	
Plaza de armas de San Luis Potosi	Carlos Mongrand		Documentary	
Vista del 15 Batallón	Carlos Mongrand		Documentary	
Vista de la esquina de la caja y zapateros de Zacatecas	Carlos Mongrand		Documentary	
Vista circular de Aguascalientes	Carlos Mongrand		Documentary	
Vista circular del jardín Hidalgo de Zacatecas	Carlos Mongrand		Documentary	
Vista circular de la plaza de armas de Aguascalientes	Carlos Mongrand		Documentary	
Comite patriotico en el parque Castillo de Orizaba	Enrique Rosas		Documentary	
Funerales del embajador Aspiroz en la ciudad de México	Enrique Rosas		Documentary	
Vapor mercante entrando al puerto de Veracruz	Enrique Rosas		Documentary	
Vistas al día siguiente de la inundación de Guanajuato	Enrique Rosas		Documentary	
Panorama de Guadalupe Hidalgo	Enrique Rosas		Documentary	
Vistas de Leon	Enrique Rosas		Documentary	
Jamaica escolar en Orizaba	Enrique Rosas		Documentary	
1906
El 8 regimiento	Carlos Mongrand		Documentary	
Fiestas presidenciales en Mérida	Enrique Rosas	Porfirio Díaz	Documentary	
General Porfirio Diaz dirigiendose a las tribunas, el 2 de abril	Salvador Toscano	Porfirio Díaz	Documentary	
Carnaval en Merida	Enrique Rosas		Documentary	
Parque Juarez y su lago	Enrique Rosas		Documentary	
Jardin de flora, del Azteca y el de Villalongin	Enrique Rosas		Documentary	
Colonia Vasco de Quiroga	Enrique Rosas		Documentary	
Bosque de San Pedro	Enrique Rosas		Documentary	
Monumento a la independencia	Salvador Toscano		Documentary	
La Fuente central	Salvador Toscano		Documentary	
Viaje a Yucatan	Salvador Toscano		Documentary	
Incendio del cajon de ropa la Valenciana, la noche del 4 de abril	Salvador Toscano		Documentary	
El Puente del Tecolote, camino de Guanajuato	Salvador Toscano		Documentary	
Lago de Chapultepec	Salvador Toscano		Documentary	
Gran corrida de toros en Guadalajara	Salvador Toscano		Documentary	
Fiesta popular en los llanos de Anzures	Salvador Toscano		Documentary	
Hacienda de Colon, estado de Puebla	Salvador Toscano		Documentary	
Fiestas del 5 de mayo en orizaba	Salvador Toscano		Documentary	
Concurso y combate floral	Salvador Toscano		Documentary	
Combate de flores en Orizaba	Salvador Toscano		Documentary	
El Puerto de Veracruz	Salvador Toscano		Documentary	
Parque Ciriaco Vazquez, Veracruz	Salvador Toscano		Documentary	
Gran corrida de toros en Chihuahua	Salvador Toscano		Documentary	
Fra Diavolo en la Alameda	Salvador Toscano		Documentary	
Plaza de armas y catedral de Mexico	Salvador Toscano		Documentary	
Hermoso efecto de olas en el puerto viejo, Mazatlan	Salvador Toscano		Documentary	
Un Buen jinete, jaripeo en Colima	Salvador Toscano		Documentary	
Salto de Juanacatlan	Salvador Toscano		Documentary	
Combate floral en Guadalajara	Salvador Toscano		Documentary	
Paseo por los bosques de San Pedro en Morelia	Salvador Toscano		Documentary	
El Río Duero en Michoacán	Salvador Toscano		Documentary	
Inundación en Guadalajara	Salvador Toscano		Documentary	
Excursión a Guadalajara	Salvador Toscano		Documentary	
1907
La Cerveceria Cuauhtemoc de Monterrey	Carlos Mongrand		Documentary	
De Guadalupe a Zacatecas	Carlos Mongrand		Documentary	
La Defenza de nuestra bandera	Guillermo Becerril		Documentary	
Departamento de bombas en San Lazaro	Salvador Toscano		Documentary	
Inauguración del trafico internacional de Tehuantepec	Salvador Toscano		Documentary	
Paisaje entre Alvarado y Veracruz	Salvador Toscano		Documentary	
Colocación de la primera piedra de los edificios de la expocición nacional	Salvador Toscano		Documentary	
El Terremoto de Chilpancingo	Salvador Toscano		Documentary	
Salto de Necaxa, sierra de Puebla	Salvador Toscano		Documentary	
Manifestación del 18 de julio en Mexico	Salvador Toscano		Documentary	
Fuente de Neptuno	Salvador Toscano		Documentary	
Fuente de Chapultepec	Salvador Toscano		Documentary	
Alameda de Veracruz	Salvador Toscano		Documentary	
Monumento a Juarez en Zapotlan	Salvador Toscano		Documentary	
El Cerro de Zapotlan el grande	Salvador Toscano		Documentary	
Casamiento de indios en Zapotlan	Salvador Toscano		Documentary	
Calle de la merced en Zapotlan	Salvador Toscano		Documentary	
Panoramica de Zapotlan	Salvador Toscano		Documentary	
Fiesta en honor de Mr. Root en Puebla	Salvador Toscano		Documentary	
Bahia de puerto Mexico, Veracruz	Salvador Toscano		Documentary	
Afueras de Tulancingo, estado de Hidalgo	Salvador Toscano		Documentary	
1908
Primera corrida de Gaona	Enrique Rosas		Documentary	
Expocisión de Coyoacan	Enrique Rosas		Documentary	
Beneficio de Gaona	Enrique Rosas		Documentary	
Molino de San Mateo, Atlixco	Salvador Toscano		Documentary	
Fabrica de Metepec en actualidad	Salvador Toscano		Documentary	
Calle de Donceles, Atlixco	Salvador Toscano		Documentary	
Siembra de trigo en San Mateo, Atlixco	Salvador Toscano		Documentary	
Pasteleria el Globo, Mexico	Salvador Toscano		Documentary	
La Familia Duran	Salvador Toscano		Documentary	
Estatua de la libertad, Puebla	Salvador Toscano		Documentary	
Vista de Atlixco	Salvador Toscano		Documentary	
Lago Camecuaro, Michoacán	Salvador Toscano		Documentary	
Rodolfo Gaona	Salvador Toscano		Documentary	
1909
Entrevista de los Presidentes Díaz-Taft	Alva Brothers	Porfirio Díaz, William Howard Taft	Documentary	
Código de Rodolfo Gaona en Puebla	Enrique Rosas		Documentary	
Incendio del teatro guerrero de Puebla	Enrique Rosas		Documentary	
Arribo del nuevo arzobispo	Enrique Rosas		Documentary	
El Rosario de Amozoc	Enrique Rosas	Enrique Rosas	Comedy	
Don Juan Tenorio	Enrique Rosas	Enrique Rosas	Comedy	
Gaona en Puebla	Salvador Toscano		Documentary	
Al Sr. Bermudez no le gustan los agentes	Salvador Toscano		Comedy	
El Sr. Durand quiere irse de Juerga	Salvador Toscano		Comedy	
