= List of Mexican films of 2009 =

This is a list of Mexican films released in 2009.

== 2009 ==
| Title | Director | Cast | Genre | References | Notes |
|---|---|---|---|---|---|
2009
| Backyard: El Traspatio | Carlos Carrera | Ana de la Reguera, Joaquin Cossio | Crime Drama | Winner Silver Plague at the Chicago International Film Festival.; Best Editing [Óscar Figueroa] and Best Screenplay [Sabina Berman] at the Havana Film Festival.; Best Actress Ana de la Reguera at the Imagen Awards | |
| Cabeza de Buda | Salvador Garcini | Kuno Becker, Julio Bracho | | | |
| El Estudiante | Roberto Grault | Jorge Lavat, Norma Lazareno | Comedy | | |
| Alamar | Pedro González-Rubio | Jorge Machado | Drama | Rotterdam International Film Festival: Tiger Award | |

== See also ==
- List of 2009 box office number-one films in Mexico
