= List of Mexican films of 2001 =

This is a list of Mexican films released in 2001.

== 2001 ==
Title	Director	Cast	Genre	Notes
Atlético San Pancho	Gustavo Loza	Héctor Suárez, Lumi Cavazos		
Corazones rotos	Rafael Montero			
Cuento de hadas para dormir cocodrilos	Ignacio Ortiz			
De la calle	Gerardo Tort	Maya Zapata, Luis Felipe Tovar		
Demasiado amor	Ernesto Rimoch			
El espinazo del diablo	Guillermo del Toro	Eduardo Noriega, Marisa Pàredes		
Inspiración	Ángel Mario Huerta	Bárbara Mori, Arath de la Torre		
La mexicana	Gore Verbinski	Brad Pitt, Julia Roberts, James Gandolfini	Dark comedy adventure crime	Co-production with the United States
Otilia Rauda	Dana Rotberg			
Pachito Rex, me voy pero no del todo	Fabián Hofman			
El segundo aire	Fernando Sariñana	Jesus Ochoa, Jorge Poza		
Un mundo raro	Armando Casas			
Vivir mata	Nicolás Echevarría			
Y tu mamá también	Alfonso Cuarón	Gael García Bernal, Diego Luna, Maribel Verdú		Academy Award nominee
Perfume de violetas, nadie te oye	Marisa Sistach	Ximena Ayala, Nancy Gutiérrez		
Don't Tempt Me	Agustín Díaz Yanes	Penélope Cruz, Victoria Abril		Co-production with Spain
Me la debes	Carlos Cuarón		Short	
Serafín: La película	René Cardona III	María Fernanda Morales		
