= List of Mexican films of 2008 =

This is a list of Mexican films released in 2008.

== 2008 ==
| Title | Director | Cast | Genre | Notes |
|---|---|---|---|---|
2008
| Arráncame la Vida | Roberto Sneider | Daniel Giménez Cacho, Ana Claudia Talancón, José María de Tavira, Isela Vega | Romance | |
| The Desert Within | Rodrigo Plá | | Religious | Amiens International Film Festival: Special Jury Award; Guadalajara International Film Festival: Audience Award; MEZCAL Award; Best Film; Best Screenplay; Best Cinematography; Best Actor (Mario Zaragoza); Best Actress (Dolores Heredia); Haifa International Film Festival: FIPRESCI Prize; Havana Film Festival: Best Cinematography; Lleida Latin-American Film Festival: Best Film; Uruguay International Film Festival: Critics Award; 2nd place - Best Latin-American Film |
| Five Days Without Nora | Mariana Chenillo | | Comedy | Biarritz Festival Latin America, Best Film; Expresión en Corto International Film Festival, Best First Film; Havana Film Festival, Grand Coral - Third Prize; Huelva Latin American Film Festival, Best Actor (Fernando Luján); Los Angeles Latino International Film Festival, Jury Award for Best Director and Best First film; Mar del Plata International Film Festival, Best Film; Miami International Film Festival, Audience Award; Morelia International Film Festival, Audience Award; Moscow International Film Festival, Silver St. George (Best Director); Skip City International D-Cinema Festival, Best Screenplay |
| Insignificant Things | Andrea Martínez | Paulina Gaitán, Carmelo Gómez, Blanca Guerra, Lucía Jiménez, Fernando Luján, Bárbara Mori, Arturo Ríos | | |
| Meet the Head of Juan Pérez | Emilio Portes | | | |
| Kada kien su karma | | | Comedy | |

== See also ==
- List of 2008 box office number-one films in Mexico
