= Attacks from the Future: Rinoplasticos =

Attacks from the Future
- Rinoplasticos VI film poster
- Directed by: Pauli Janhunen Calderón
- Produced by: Marina Janhunen Calderón; Álvaro Calderón Grobet
- Starring: Andrés Luciano Calderón; Pauli Janhunen Calderón; Emilio Janhunen Calderón; Álvaro Calderón Grobet; Marina Janhunen Calderón; Xizco O. Triana; Álvaro Calderón Sr. Pablo Calderón Ramírez; Timo Janhunen; Mike Bangle; David Anghel
- Edited by: Andrés Luciano Calderón; Pauli Janhunen Calderón
- Production companies: Productions Calderón; Sobrelcielo Video; Janhunen Pictures; DEP Films
- Distributed by: Subsuelo Audio; Guard Entertainment
- Running time: The Rinoplasticos: 10 min Rinoplasticos II: 19 min Rinoplasticos III: 24 min Rinoplasticos IV: 26 min A Frozen Land: 21 min Rinoplasticos V: 28 min Rinoplasticos VI: 60 min The Story of Kripto: 62 min A Warrior's Journey: 55 min The Paths of Kripto: 75 min The Reflection of Kripto: 60 min
- Countries: Mexico, Sweden, Finland
- Languages: Spanish, English

Attacks from the Future (original title in Spanish: Ataques Del Futuro) is an independent film series of fantasy–science fiction–adventure made by Calderón Productions, with some valuable help from Subsuelo Audio and Sobrelcielo Video. Most films have been made in Mexico, however, part of the series has been produced in Sweden and Finland. The films started with their first release on the big screen in 2005 with Attacks from the Future Episode I. After the success of the first film, Calderon Productions decided to continue making these films, thus the Saga was born.

It includes two series. The original series started in 2005, and ended in 2012 with Rinoplasticos VI. The expanded series started in 2010 with A Frozen Land, and ended in 2016 with The Reflection of Kripto. Most of the expanded series have been filmed in Finland. The main character of the series, Rimopasto, has also appeared as a holographic figure in the films Heroes del Destino (2014) and Heroes del Destino II (2018), which were also produced by the same filmmakers.

== Development ==
=== First film ===
In early 2004, Productions Calderon did some test filming in Ixtapa. After watching the footage they decided to make a story about it. The production began in June 2005. At first they had some problems with coming up with the right concept for the heroes, Then they got it. They were to be a mutant race, involved in saving their world and Universe. They are half rhinoceros half plastic: a Rinoplastico. The film takes place 5 million years into the future, so it made sense with these kind of mutations. It took about 2 weeks to film, and several days to edit. To make the figures, props and sets. They used, mostly plastilina (a Mexican type of clay), and all sorts of recycled materials.

=== Second and third films ===
After the first film productions Calderon decided to make at least two sequels. The production began in the summer of 2006. They took the opportunity to introduce new characters, and expanding world. The film had its premiere in winter 2006. It was also the first to include a Bonus Feature on the DVD. After the second part they started working on the third one. It was filmed during winter of 2007, afterwards it spent a long time in post-production. It was finally released in spring of 2008. At first it was supposed to be the final part of the series, but before the premiere of the third film it was decided that it should be six films.

=== Fourth film and spin-off ===
After the third film the production took a little break to figure out the next story. After a lot of changes in development they were ready to film. It had its premiere at New Year's Eve 2009. After the fourth film it was decided to make a spin-off. Productions Calderon got help from Guard Entertainment. It was originally supposed to be in Spanish as the other films, but because of the new crew it was made in English. It was filmed in Sweden and Finland 2010. It was the first one to be filmed in snow, as the other ones where filmed in tropic environments.

=== Fifth and sixth film ===
After Rinoplasticos 4,5: A Frozen Land Productions Calderon were ready to make the fifth instalment of the Rinoplastico series. The filming began summer 2010. In this part they tried to make the audience concentrate more on the story rather than all the action. The film had its premiere in June 2011. The script for the sixth chapter was written during the fall of 2011. Filming started in late December 2011, and was concluded in January 2012. It had its premiere July 2012. It was supposed to be the last part chronologically, and it was the first episode to be an hour long.

=== Further spin-off films ===
The release of A Frozen Land inspired new ideas of films featuring other characters. A film about Kripto entered development in summer 2010, later another film about Minipupa was also announced. Both films would serve as prequels and stand-alone films in the series. However both of these films were put on hiatus due to filming of Rinoplasticos V and VI. Almost a month after the premiere of VI a spin-off short was made, called The Good Side is Better. This revived the ideas of the other two prequel films. This series was later titled The Expanded series. The Story of Kripto started filming in fall 2012, and was released that following spring. An untitled Kripto sequel was announced for a 2015 release, as a celebration of the 10-year anniversary. A Warrior's Journey started production in summer 2014. The release of The Paths of Kripto was the final partnership with Janhunen Pictures. DEP Films took over as co-production company during the production of the third Kripto film and will also be distributing future releases.

== Original series ==
=== Attacks from the Future: The Rinoplasticos (2005) ===
5 million years in the future a new race called Rinoplasticos are going to leave to a new home. One of them is named Rimopasto. He leads his friends on the way. A squad of evil robots led by the powerful Munra tries to take over the planet and destroy the Rinoplasticos. A friend, The Iguana Rescuer, comes to the aid of the Rinoplasticos and fights against the robots. Munra manages to kill Rimopasto's friends before he himself meets his demise.

=== Attacks from the Future: Rinoplasticos II (2006) ===
(Alternately spelled Attacks from the Future 2) As the only survivor of Munra's attack, Rimopasto finds himself alone in the wild. He finds a new friend called Rino who takes him to the city of the Elegant Dinos. The leader of the town is called Rexy and is a good friend of Rino. Meanwhile, the two generals Mucra and Cucra find out that Munra is dead. The generals inform Ork Malok the ruler of the square planet about the discovery. A new breed of robots, including Kripto, prepare to avenge their friend. Rexy sends the Rinoplasticos to hide in the sacred cave. Ork Malok's troops kills the Elegant Dinos. Rexy manages to survive. When the troops arrive at the cave they are ambushed by its protector: The Great Cavern Dragon. The generals are killed while Ork Malok returns home.

=== Attacks from the Future: Rinoplasticos III (2008) ===
(Stylized as R-III and alternately spelled Rinoplasticos: Revenge of the Malok) The Rinoplasticos find a relic that teleports them to the center of time. There they encounter a magical being named Torpac. He sends two Rinoplastico warriors from the past to help them defeat the robots. The warriors are called Minipupa and Savion Mimbra. Meanwhile, Mas Malok returns to his home planet and punishes Ork Malok for his previous commands. With the aid of his two new generals: Scales and Kliek, they take their best troops, including an upgraded Kripto, and go to the planet of the Rinoplasticos, to kill them all. Rexy gets to the cave and warns his friends about the attack. The troops land outside the cave and fight the Cavern Dragon, who ultimately is killed by Scales. General 3 Eyes sends the robot troops to fight Minipupa. The Rinoplasticos eventually win the fight. The only robot to survive is Kripto who decides to stay with his new friends. Savion Mimbra is however killed in the fight. Mask Malok tries to escape, but on his way home he is killed by a new alien race called the Depredators.

=== Attacks from the Future: Rinoplasticos IV (2009) ===
(Stylized as R-4) The robot race the Depredators led under the command of the evil Mani Comio take over the square planet. They defeat all the remaining robots on the planet, including General 3 Eyes. They then prepare to attack the Rinoplasticos for still unknown reasons. Rimopasto and Rino go on a journey to find more Rinoplasticos. They discover that their warrior friend Minipupa has disappeared, they assume he has some important mission to do (events are explained in A Frozen Land). Some new friends they find are: Rino-Retro, Riplat, Cuernito and Rino Rainbow. They encounter the great Clam Chowder-Luck who tells them a vision of the future. The Depredators land on the planet and captures one Rinoplastico at a time. Rino and Rimopasto with some help from Rexy find their way to a new continent. There they are greeted by the Fighting Primates. Meanwhile, Kripto is captured by Mani Comio.

=== Attacks from the Future: Rinoplasticos V (2011) ===
(Alternately spelled Rinoplasticos 5) Rimopasto and Rino have been resting and gathering strength in the village of the Fighting Primates for over a year. Rino gets sent away inside a crystal pyramid, in order to do something very important for their race. The Depredators with the help of the Orgunz attack the village and captures Rimopasto. Meanwhile, Kripto is held prisoner in Mani Comio's laboratory. A clone similar to Kripto is created. Rino meets Torpac inside the pyramid world. Torpac says that he must find Granpupa (previously known as Minipupa) in order to win back the freedom of the Rinoplasticos. Rino is transported to a mysterious jungle. He is attacked by strange creatures called Naranxilles. A new friend called Rhinochero saves Rino from the Naranxilles. He shows Rino that he and some other warrior Rinoplasticos have lived in peace there. He says to Rino that they will help him free Rimopasto from the Depredators. Mani Comio lands on the planet and searches for the location of Rino.

=== Attacks from the Future: Rinoplasticos VI (2012) ===
(Stylized as Rinoplasticos^{IIIIII} and alternately spelled Rinoplasticos: The Final Battle) Clam Chowder-Luck tells the story of the evolution of the Rinoplasticos. Rino and his new friends led by Rhinochero make their way out of the jungle. They find a creature called Cerdoplastico who shows them where Granpupa is. They eventually meet Granpupa who tells them that he had to stop a relic in the frozen lands. He then tells them that he will guide them to the secret city. Meanwhile, the evil forces of the Triangle planet led by General 6 Eyes find the remains of Mas Malok in the Intergalactic ocean. Rimopasto is shown that the Depredators want to make bottles out of the Rinoplasticos. A friend called Riplat is killed and his body is filled with liquid. Rimopasto is held alive as they still have use of him. Mani Comio finds Rino and his friends he fights and defeats them. They are all taken to the base as prisoners. Kripto escapes the laboratory and frees the Rinoplasticos. During the escape Kripto defeats his evil clone. Meanwhile, Mas Malok has been rebuilt as Super Malok. He tells his troops to prepare for the final battle. Rino and his friends face Mani Comio who is revealed to be the Court Jester (previously appeared in Rinoplasticos II) who was believed to be dead. Super Malok arrives with his troops and a great battle takes place. Rexy arrivies with a ship and helps his friends get away. The Court Jester takes out a bomb and destroys himself, Super Malok and the planet. Back home the Rinoplasticos are greeted by Toprac, Clam Chowder-Luck and the Orgunz. They all celebrate their victory. (The first episode to be an hour long)

In a post-credit scene the evil clone of Kripto survives and finds the crystal pyramid. He travels back in time to the human age. The President is informed that a mysterious ship is approaching Earth. The President replies that the age of the Atomic war has begun.

== Expanded series ==
=== A Frozen Land (2010) ===
(Stylized and alternately spelled as Rinoplasticos 4,5: A Frozen Land) Mani Comio tells some of his Depredators that they have to find the snow relic. Riplat meets with Minipupa that tells him that he needs his help. Riplat is taken to the courters of the spiritual being called Luhos the Wise. He tells them that they will go on a mission to stop the dangerous snow relic that is threatening the whole world. The Depredators led by Firon Mortimalax land in the frozen lands. Riplat and his friend Loumu are attacked by them. Minipupa comes to rescue with help from two other Rinoplastico warriors named Reicon and Mephiles. They manage to defeat most of the Depredators before they make their way to the Snow Temple. Inside the temple they meet the Relic Keeper. Reicon and Mephiles are killed by Firon Mortimalax. Riplats tries to fight him, is defeated and the relic gets destroyed. Minipupa makes his way back to his friends Rino and Rimopasto

Takes place between Rinoplasticos IV and V. Explains what happened to the character Riplat and why Minipupa disappeared from the group. It is also he first film in the series to be in English language.

=== The Story of Kripto (2013) ===
(commonly referred to as Kripto) A followup starring a minor character in the series. Set in three acts. The film is about the robotic creature Kripto and his struggle to survive the harch war conditions, and to be accepted in to society by Mas Malok and the Powerful Munra. Production of this film started in late October 2012. Post-production was completed during the spring of 2013. It was released on March 29, 2013, in Europe, and on July 5 in America.

=== A Warrior's Journey (2014) ===
(Also known as Rinoplasticos: A Warrior's Journey) An army led by a powerful Rinoplastico is threatening to destroy all the remaining villages. Mimbra must find and gather all the surviving warriors in order to come up with a way to defeat the menacing empire.

It was first revealed in 2011 with the title Minipupa: The Great Warrior. Production began Summer 2014 and was released in November 2014. It was stated as a stand-alone story, but it could also be considered a follow-up to Frozen Land.

=== The Paths of Kripto (2015) ===
(commonly referred to as Kripto II) A sequel that takes place after Rinoplasticos VI. A new enemy that belongs to the same breed as Kripto emerges. Kripto must find a way to travel to a desolated world in order to stop his enemy. On his travel he reunites with a friend who carries valuable information. A new villain, Raako, was introduced in this film.

It was released on May 23, 2015, which coincided with the 10-Year Anniversary of the saga. Filming took place from August to December 2014. Additional pick-ups and voices were recorded during Spring 2015. It features the return of characters like Rexy, Rimopasto, General 6 Eyes and Rino in major roles since the release of Rinoplasticos VI in 2012.

=== The Reflection of Kripto (2016) ===
(commonly referred to as Kripto III) The final film centered on Kripto who vanished after the events of the last film. He wakes up after a 200 million year coma on the continent Pangea II. It's a world were all his friends no longer exist. Together with a new ally, named Suiber, he must find a way back and confront an enemy who lures in the dark.

A release date for November 2016 was set during April 2015. Production started in Finland in early July 2016. Filming later moved to Mexico in August, where it wrapped photography on August 17. It had a limited screening in the beginning of November and was released worldwide on the internet on November 27.

== One-Shots ==
=== The Good Side is Better (2012) ===
(Also known as Rinoplasticos One-Shot: The Good Side is Better) Takes place during the same time as the events of Rinoplasticos VI. Tells the story of what happened to the Orgunz and the Earth Depredator after they got captured by the Fighting Primates. Also explains how Rexy knows were the Rinoplasticos are. It features a cameo of Kripto's clone and the Crystal Pyramid.

The short was filmed on July 27, 2012. Just a few weeks after the premiere of VI. It was included in the special features of the release of The Story of Kripto. The runtime is 12 minutes.

=== Lemon Quest (2015) ===
(Also known as Rinoplasticos One-Shot: Lemon Quest) Takes place after the events of The Paths of Kripto. Tells the story of three Rinoplasticos who look for an abandoned village where they can find lemons. They are followed by a few surviving robots and Guiron's friend Keron. They meet the leader of the Grand tribe of the Urlac (last seen in Rinoplasticos IV).

The short was filmed on December 31, 2015 and premiered the same day. It was included in the special features of the release of The Reflection of Kripto. The runtime is 10 minutes.

== Future ==
=== Upcoming films ===
During the making of the original series there was talk about making prequels featuring minor characters. Two of them were confirmed in 2010 as: The Story of Kripto, which was initially intended to be in three parts. Part I: Boot Camp, Part II: The War and Part III: Aftermath. Another prequel was Minipupa: The Great Warrior, which would tell the story of Minipupa before the events of Rinoplasticos III. The filmmakers had also discussed the idea of rebranding Attacks from the Future into an anthology series. With variations in storytelling as well as utilizing different kinds of animation and other techniques.

In 2012 it was revealed that The Story of Kripto would start filming in late October to early November that year, with a release for spring 2013. It was also announced that A Warrior's Journey (previously titled Minipupa: The Great Warrior) was set to be released in summer of 2015. The three parts of The Story of Kripto would now appear as three acts in the film which meant that they would not be released as separate films. In October 2012 it was revealed that Munra (who was the main antagonist in the first film) was going to have a major role in the prequel. On October 29 the first official image was revealed.

In January 2013 it was said that Warrior's Journey would be filmed back-to-back with a still untitled film about Kripto. The release date for Warrior was changed from summer 2015 to Christmas 2014, as the Kripto film received the summer release. Both films will be filmed in Finland. In May 2013 the production started writing the scripts. The title for The Paths of Kripto was revealed and confirmed on June 5, 2014.

The first concept art poster for Warrior was released on March 9, 2014. Filming commenced during June 2014. The sequel to Warrior was initially announced for a Fall 2017 release. The storyline for the film was revealed with the premiere of Reflection of Kripto in November 2016.

=== A Fallen Warrior ===
(Also known as Rinoplasticos: A Fallen Warrior) The sequel to A Warrior's Journey. The story will be set a few years after Malaghul was defeated by the warriors. Minipupa along with Mimbra, Nautilus, Greenar, Reicon and newcomer Mephiles have restored balance in the valley of the Rinoplasticos. However, when Minipupa returns after defending a village from giant Naranxilles he gets to hear some terrible news; Mimbra has given up his title as a warrior and is trapped in exile in valley far away. The other warrior's can't believe what they are hearing and decide to embark on a trip to find Mimbra. The film will also be about the final sparks in the Rinoplastico War and will explain how the Rinoplasticos became less civilized and returned their more humble roots.

This was intended to be the final film in the Expanded series. It was set to begin production during July 2017 for a December release. Filming was ultimately delayed until the following Summer. This was due to issues getting all the necessary tools for the props and creating the figures. The release date was initially changed to late 2018, but it was later pushed back again when scheduling became complicated. A targeted release December 2019 could not be reached as key crew members could not partake in filming at the same time. As the global pandemic of 2020 started it was stated that the film was put on hold indefinitely. If the film would end up being made, the release of it would mark the longest gap in between films.

=== The War Survivor ===
(Also known as Rinoplasticos One-Shot: The War Survivor) Takes place after the events of The Reflection of Kripto. It is set to be about the surviving Robots on Earth and their plan to travel to a new home. It was announced to start production in early February 2017, but it was later delayed to an unspecified date because of scheduling and prop complications, which also halted production of A Fallen Warrior. As of 2021, the short remains on hold.

=== Potential Rinoplasticos VII ===
It is confirmed that the sixth part is the final chapter in the Original series, but there has been rumors that a seventh film would be the launch of a new series tentatively called the Revival series. It was said that if a Attacks from the Future: Rinoplasticos VII would be made, "it wouldn't be until the year 2021", and that it would be in Spanish again. Calderón Productions has mentioned that the older we all get the more necessary it is to write another Attacks from the Future movie. As of 2021, there have been no further updates.

== Cast and characters ==
Character	Original series						Expanded series				
Character	The Rinoplasticos	Rinoplasticos II	Rinoplasticos III	Rinoplasticos IV	Rinoplasticos V	Rinoplasticos VI	A Frozen Land	The Story of Kripto	A Warrior's Journey	The Paths of Kripto	The Reflection of Kripto
Rimopasto	Andrés Luciano Calderón	Andrés Luciano Calderón	Andrés Luciano Calderón	Andrés Luciano Calderón	Andrés Luciano Calderón	Andrés Luciano Calderón	Mentioned	Stock footage	Timo Janhunen	Timo Janhunen	Mentioned
Kripto	Pauli Janhunen Calderón	Pauli Janhunen Calderón	Pauli Janhunen Calderón	Pauli Janhunen Calderón	Pauli Janhunen Calderón	Pauli Janhunen Calderón		Pauli Janhunen Calderón		Pauli Janhunen Calderón	Pauli Janhunen Calderón
Rino		Pauli Janhunen Calderón	Pauli Janhunen Calderón	Pauli Janhunen Calderón	Pauli Janhunen Calderón	Pauli Janhunen Calderón	Mentioned	Stock footage	Emilio Janhunen Calderón	Emilio Janhunen Calderón	
Minipupa/Granpupa			Andrés Calderon	Mentioned	Mentioned	Andrés Calderon	Pauli JC	Stock footage	Pauli JC		
Rexy		Álvaro Calderón Grobet	Álvaro Calderón Grobet	Álvaro Calderón Grobet		Álvaro Calderón Grobet	Silent role			Henrik Lindmark	
Mas Malok/Super Malok			Andrés Luciano Calderón	Mentioned		Andrés Luciano Calderón		Pauli Janhunen Calderón		Flashback cameo	
Mani Comio				Andrés Luciano Calderón	Andrés Luciano Calderón	Andrés Luciano Calderón	Pauli Janhunen Calderón	Pauli Janhunen Calderón			
Torpac			Álvaro Calderón Grobet		Álvaro Calderón Grobet	Álvaro Calderón Grobet				Álvaro Calderón Grobet	
Powerful Munra	Andrés Luciano Calderón	Mentioned						Pauli Janhunen Calderón			
Robot-Eating Creature	Pauli Janhunen Calderón										
Iguana Rescuer	Andrés Luciano Calderón										
Ork Malok		Andrés Luciano Calderón	Andrés Luciano Calderón			Mentioned		Emilio Janhunen Calderón			
Court Jester		Álvaro Calderón Grobet	Mentioned			Pauli JC & Andrés Luciano		Silent cameo			
Great Cave Cavern Dragon		Álvaro Calderón Senior	Álvaro Calderón Senior			Silent cameo					
Mucra		Andrés Luciano Calderón						Pauli Janhunen Calderón			
Cucra		Álvaro Calderón Grobet						Mentioned			
General Scales			Andrés Luciano Calderón								
General Kliek			Pauli Janhunen Calderón								
General 3 Eyes			Xizco O. Triana	Emilio Janhunen Calderón							
Savion Mimbra			Álvaro Calderón Grobet			Silent cameo			Pauli JC		
Firon Mortimalax			Pauli Janhunen Calderón	Pauli Janhunen Calderón	Pauli Janhunen Calderón	Pauli Janhunen Calderón	Pauli Janhunen Calderón	Pauli Janhunen Calderón			
Clam Chowder-Luck				Álvaro Calderón Grobet		Álvaro Calderón Grobet					Álvaro Calderón Grobet
Earth Depredator				Pauli Janhunen Calderon	Pauli Janhunen Calderon	Pauli Janhunen Calderon	Pauli Janhunen Calderon	Pauli Janhunen Calderon		Emilio Janhunen Calderon	
Riplat				Pauli Janhunen Calderón		Álvaro Calderón Grobet	Pauli Janhunen Calderón				
Rexa				Mayte Calderón Grobet							
Rino-Retro				Pauli JC & Andres Luciano							
Orgunz				Pauli Janhunen Calderon	Pauli Janhunen Calderon	Pauli Janhunen Calderon					
Rhinochero					Andrés Luciano Calderón	Andrés Luciano Calderón			Andrés Luciano		
King Luchon					Emilio Janhunen Calderón						
Picos Brawl					Emilio Janhunen Calderón	Emilio Janhunen Calderón			Andrés Luciano		
Ojos					Pauli Janhunen Calderón	Pauli Janhunen Calderón					
Kripto Clone/Zedus					Pauli Janhunen Calderón	Pauli Janhunen Calderón			Pauli Janhunen Calderón	Pauli Janhunen Calderón	Pauli Janhunen Calderón
The Butler					Emilio Janhunen Calderon	Emilio Janhunen Calderon					
General 6 Eyes						Xizco O. Triana				Xizco O. Triana	Silent cameo
Reicon							Pauli JC		Alvaro Calderón		
Loumu							Emilio Janhunen				
Luhos the Wise							Pauli JC		David Anghel		
Kropti								Emilio Janhunen Calderon		Emilio Janhunen Calderon	Emilio Janhunen Calderon
Malaghul									Alvaro Calderon		Alvaro Calderon
Raako										David Anghel	David Anghel

== Principal crew ==
Role	Original series						Expanded series				
Role	The Rinoplasticos	Rinoplasticos II	Rinoplasticos III	Rinoplasticos IV	Rinoplasticos V	Rinoplasticos VI	A Frozen Land	The Story of Kripto	A Warrior's Journey	The Paths of Kripto	The Reflection of Kripto
Director	Pauli Janhunen Calderón	Pauli Janhunen Calderón	Pauli Janhunen Calderón	Pauli Janhunen Calderón	Pauli Janhunen Calderón	Pauli Janhunen Calderón	Pauli Janhunen Calderón	Pauli Janhunen Calderón	Pauli Janhunen Calderón	Pauli Janhunen Calderón	Pauli Janhunen Calderón
Producer	Marina Janhunen Calderón & Alvaro Calderón Grobet	Marina Janhunen Calderón & Alvaro Calderón Grobet	Marina Janhunen Calderón & Alvaro Calderón Grobet	Marina Janhunen Calderón & Alvaro Calderón Grobet	Marina Janhunen Calderón & Alvaro Calderón Grobet	Marina Janhunen Calderón & Alvaro Calderón Grobet	Emilio Janhunen Calderón	Emilio Janhunen Calderón	Emilio Janhunen Calderón	Emilio Janhunen Calderón	Emilio Janhunen Calderón
Writer	Pauli Janhunen Calderón & Andrés Luciano Calderón	Pauli Janhunen Calderón & Andrés Luciano Calderón	Pauli Janhunen Calderón & Andrés Luciano Calderón	Pauli Janhunen Calderón & Andrés Luciano Calderón	Pauli Janhunen Calderón & Andrés Luciano Calderón	Pauli Janhunen Calderón	Aaron Hägg	Pauli Janhunen Calderón & Fransi Milocetti	Pauli Janhunen Calderón & Andrés Luciano	Pauli Janhunen Calderón	Pauli Janhunen Calderón
Cinematographer	Andrés Luciano Calderón	Andrés Luciano Calderón	Andrés Luciano Calderón	Andrés Luciano Calderón	Andrés Luciano Calderón	Andrés Luciano Calderón	Pauli Janhunen Calderón	Pauli Janhunen Calderón	Pauli Janhunen Calderón	Pauli Janhunen Calderón	Pauli Janhunen Calderón & Emilio Janhunen Calderón
Assistant director	Emilio Janhunen Calderón	Emilio Janhunen Calderón	Emilio Janhunen Calderón	Emilio Janhunen Calderón	Emilio Janhunen Calderón	Emilio Janhunen Calderón	Emilio Janhunen Calderón	Emilio Janhunen Calderón	Emilio Janhunen Calderón	Emilio Janhunen Calderón	Emilio Janhunen Calderón
Key Grip	Alvaro Calderón Grobet	Alvaro Calderón Grobet	Alvaro Calderón & Xizco O. Triana	Alvaro Calderón Grobet	Alvaro Calderón Grobet	Alvaro Calderón & Xizco O. Triana	Fransi Milocetti	Fransi Milocetti	Pablo Calderón Ramirez	Pablo Calderón Ramirez	Pablo Calderón Ramirez

== Box office performance ==
Film	Release date	Budget		
Film	Release date	Budget	Mexico and Sweden	Worldwide
The Rinoplasticos	July 9, 2005			
Rinoplasticos II	November 7, 2006			
Rinoplasticos III – Revenge of the Malok	June 24, 2008			
Rinoplasticos IV	December 31, 2009			
A Frozen Land	December 24, 2010			
Rinoplasticos V	June 6, 2011			
Rinoplasticos VI – The Final Battle	July 7, 2012			
The Story of Kripto	March 29, 2013 (Europe) July 5, (America)			
A Warrior's Journey	November 14, 2014			
The Paths of Kripto	May 23, 2015 (Europe) July 9, (America)			
The Reflection of Kripto	November 26, 2016			

- ^{(A)} indicates the adjusted totals based on current ticket prices (calculated by Box Office Mojo).
