= Iliana Fox =

Mexican actress

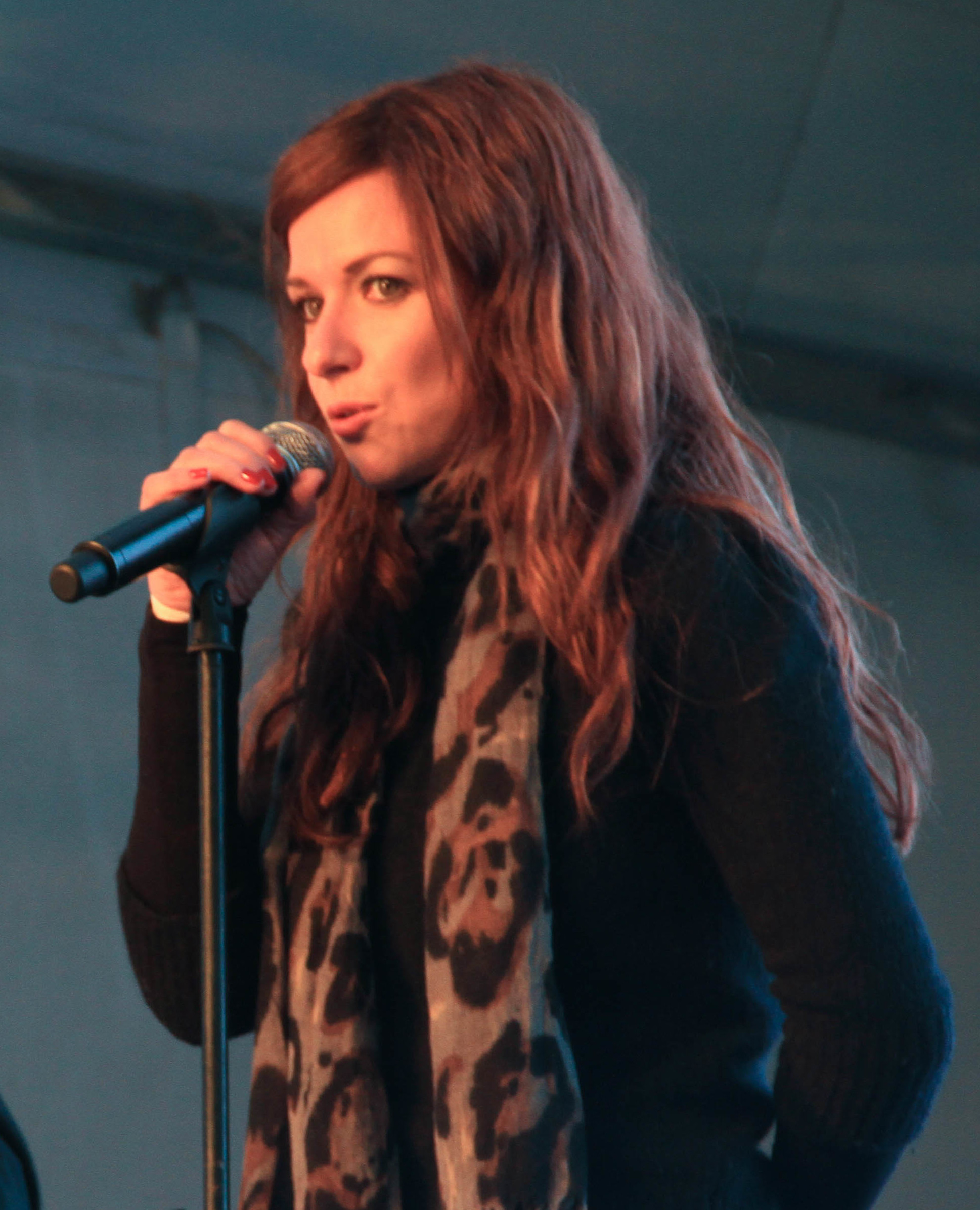
- Born: Iliana Jan Fox Gaitán; 3 January 1977 (age 49); Mexico City, Mexico
- Occupation: Actress
- Years active: 2000–present
- Partner: José María Yazpik
- Children: 1

Iliana Fox (born Iliana Jan Fox Gaitán on 3 January 1977) is a Mexican actress.

Fox grew up in Mexico, but with periods of residence in Canada and the UK. She has participated in various telenovelas such as Machos and Mirada de Mujer: El Regreso. She studied singing with Carlos Fernández and later enrolled in the TV Azteca School (CEFAC) where she studied with Raúl Quintanilla. Her first telenovela was Señora. Her first leading role was in Ellas in 1999. In her first major film, Kilometer 31, she played the lead.

In 2013, Fox co-starred in the series Fortuna, playing a police officer or agent on the Mexican channel Cadena Tres. Later that year, Fox appeared in the TV Azteca telenovela Prohibido amar.

In 2016, she co-starred with Ludwika Paleta in the film Parallel Paths.

== Personal life ==
Fox was in a relationship for several years with Mexican actor José María Yazpik with whom she had a daughter.

== Filmography ==
=== Films ===
Year	Title	Role	Notes
2004	El sonido del silencio	La Hermana	Short film
2006	Kilómetro 31	Ágata / Catalina	
2008	La hora cero	Paula	
2010	180°	Bárbara	
2011	Nos vemos, papá	Madre de Pilar	
2013	Actores S.A.	Rebeca	
2015	Las Aparicio	Mercedes	
2016	Rumbos paralelos	Silvia	
2016	Km 31-2	Ágata y Catalina	
2019	Como si fuera la primera vez	Emely	

=== Television ===
Year	Title	Role	Notes
2000	Ellas, inocentes o culpables	Victoria	
2001	Cuando seas mía	Diana Sánchez Zambrano	
2001–07	Lo que callamos las mujeres	Unknown role	2 episodes
2003	Mirada de mujer, el regreso	Ana	
2004	La vida es una canción	Unknown role	
2005	Machos	Fernanda Garrido	
2008	Vivir por ti	Ximena	
2010	Bienes raíces	Unknown role	
2011	A corazón abierto	María Alejandra Rivas Carrera	
2013	Fortuna	Florencia Elizalde	
2013	Prohibido amar	Laura Saldivar de Hernández	
2013–2018	Sr. Ávila	Tamara	
2014	Señora Acero	Vanessa Creel	13 episodes
2015	Caminos de Guanajuato	Florencia Rivero	
2017	La fiscal de hierro	Silvana Durán	
2017	Dogma	Alicia Cervantes	
2019–2020	Médicos	Susana	
2020–2021	Imperio de mentiras	Cristina	
