= 180° (film) =

- Theatrical release poster
- Directed by: Fernando Kalife
- Written by: Fernando Kalife
- Produced by: Victor Dryere; Fernando Kalife; Pablo Leva; Luis Mendoza; Fausto Muñoz; Diego Peskins; Josafath Salazar; Antonio Urdapilleta
- Starring: Elizabeth Valdéz; Rodrigo Cachero; Daniel Martínez; Fernando Becerril; Juan Martín Jáuregui; Manuel García Rulfo; Eduardo Blanco; Iliana Fox; Alejandro Cuétara
- Cinematography: Eduardo Flores Torres
- Edited by: Joel T. Pashby; Hughes Winborne
- Music by: Ángel Illarramendi
- Production companies: Tartufo Films; Fidecine; IMCINE; Equipment Film Design
- Release dates: 22 June 2010 (South Africa); 3 February 2011 (SBIFF); 4 January 2013 (Mexico)
- Running time: 105 minutes
- Country: Mexico
- Language: Spanish

180° is a 2010 Mexican comedy-drama film written, directed and co-produced by Fernando Kalife. Starring Elizabeth Valdéz, Rodrigo Cachero, Daniel Martínez, Fernando Becerril, Juan Martín Jáuregui, Manuel Garcia-Rulfo, Eduardo Blanco, Iliana Fox and Alejandro Cuétara.

== Synopsis ==
Salvador Díaz is a guy who is always involved in shady deals and owes money to Martín Soto, a mafia boss. To get the amount he must pay, he does what he knows how: cheat; for now to an elderly person (Fernando Becerril), selling him a restaurant that is not very lucrative. Then he tries to sell, to a soccer team, an Argentine player who has injured a knee and is still not fully recovered. He does these "businesses" in complicity with his friend Darío, a self-conscious, pessimistic and renegade man. When he tries to close the player's deal, the team representative reminds him of something important that Salvador had forgotten. That memory takes him back to his childhood and will help him try to make a radical change, that is to say -180 degrees- in his behavior.

== Cast ==
The actors participating in this film are:

- Manuel Garcia-Rulfo as Salvador Díaz
- Elizabeth Valdéz as Sofy
- Rodrigo Cachero as Darío
- Daniel Martínez as Martín
- Juan Martín Jáuregui as Gasparotto
- Eduardo Blanco as Lazarte
- Iliana Fox as Bárbara
- Alejandro Cuétara as Ernesto
- Fernando Becerril

== Production ==
=== Financing ===
180º was financed by the Cinema Investment and Stimulus Fund (FIDECINE) and the foundations of Nelson Mandela and Kofi Annan.

=== Filming ===
Principal photography took place in Monterrey and Mexico City in Mexico, and in Buenos Aires, Argentina.

== Release ==
180º had its world premiere on 22 June 2010, in Cape Town, South Africa. It then opened in the United States on 3 February 2011, as part of the 26th Santa Barbara International Film Festival. It had its commercial premiere on 4 January 2013, in Mexican theaters.

== Reception ==
=== Critical reception ===
Jessica Oliva from Cine Premiere highlights technical aspects such as editing by Joel T. Pashby. However, he criticizes that the moment where all the stories raised in the film intersect, the film fails to do so in a relevant or profound way, it also mentions that several characters fail to develop properly.

=== Accolades ===
Year	Award / Festival	Category	Recipient	Result	Ref.
2010	Marbella Film Festival	Best Feature Film	Fernando Kalife	Nominated	
2010	Costa Rica International Film Festival	Best International Film	Fernando Kalife & Victor Dryere	Won	
2011	Santa Barbara International Film Festival	Nueva Vision Award	Fernando Kalife	Nominated	
