= Fernando Kalife =

Mexican film director, screenwriter and producer

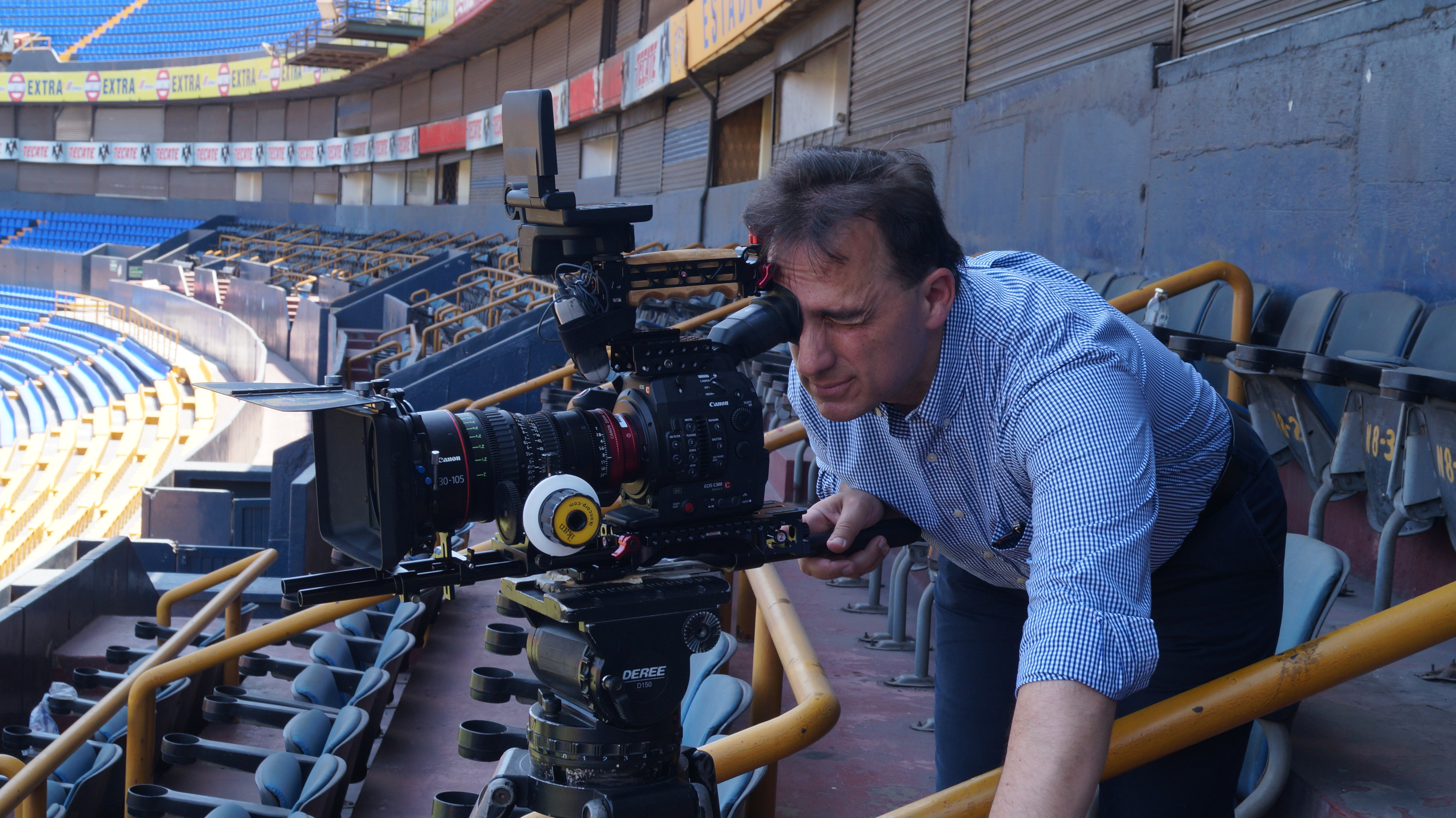
- Born: Monterrey, Mexico
- Occupations: Film director, author, screenwriter, producer.
- Years active: 2005–present
- Website: http://www.poquelinfilms.com/

Fernando Kalife (born in Monterrey, Mexico) is a Mexican film director, screenwriter and producer.

== Biography ==
Born in Monterrey Mexico.

USC Film School

Writer/Director

=== Feature films ===
- 7 Days (Best Film, Best Director in the country by specialized press, 5 Mexican Academy Nominations)
- 180° (Santa Barbara International Film Festival, winner of Best Film Nevada Film Festival, California Filmfest, Kofi Annan says: “A film of change that should be seen by everyone in our planet.”
- 108 Stitches (Kuno Becker’s best performance yet)
- A Silicon Valley Story (pre production)

=== Documentaries ===
- From Director to Director
- Arriving Home
- R75
- Becoming Champions (Series Netflix Exclusive)
- Mexico Champion of the World (in post-production)

== Awards and nominations ==
- Worldfest Film Festival Winner of the Bronze Award, Best Comedy Original... for The Mexican Way (2000)
- Mexican Cinema Journalists Silver Goddess Best Direction... for 7 Días (2005)
- San Antonio International Film Festival Best Film... for 7 Días (2005)
- 5 Mexican Academy nominations (Ópera Prima, Best Edition, Best Music Composition, Best Photography, Best Actor) for 7 Días (2006)
- Costa Rica International Film Festival Best Film... for 180º (2011)
- Santa Barbara International Film Festival Nominated Best Spanish Language Film... for 180º (2011)
- Tiburon International Film Fest Golden Reel Award... for 180º (2012)
- Nevada Film Festival Silver Award Best Feature... for 180º (2012)
- California Film Festival Best Narrative Feature... for 180º (2012)
