= List of Mexican films of 2006 =

This is a list of Mexican films released in 2006.

== 2006 ==
Title	Director	Cast	Genre	Notes
2006
Así del precipicio	Teresa Suárez	Martha Higareda, Ana de la Reguera		
Cansada de besar sapos	Jorge Colón	Ana Serradilla, José María de Tavira		
Efectos Secundarios	Issa López			
In The Pit	Juan Carlos Rulfo			
Más que a nada en el mundo	Andrés León Becker, Javier Solar			Entered into the 28th Moscow International Film Festival
"Nacho Libre"	Jared Hess			
Pan's Labyrinth o El laberinto del fauno	Guillermo del Toro	Maribel Verdú		Academy Award Nominee, entered into the 2006 Cannes Film Festival
¿Quién es el señor López?	Luis Mandoki			
Sexo, amor y otras perversiones	Carlos Carrera			
