= List of Mexican films of 2000 =

This is a list of Mexican films released in 2000.

== 2000 ==
Title	Director	Cast	Genre	Notes
Amores perros	Alejandro González Iñárritu	Gael García Bernal, Vanessa Bauche		Academy Award Nominee
Así es la vida	Arturo Ripstein			Screened at the 2000 Cannes Film Festival
Crónica de un desayuno	Benjamín Caan	María Rojo, Bruno Bichir, Angélica Aragón		
De ida y vuelta	Salvador Aguirre			
En el país de no pasa nada	María del Carmen de Lara			
Escrito en el cuerpo de la noche	Jaime Humberto Hermosillo			
La perdición de los hombres	Arturo Ripstein			
Piedras verdes	Ángel Flores Torres	Vanessa Bauche, Osvaldo Benavides		
Por la libre	Juan Carlos de Llaca	Osvaldo Benavides, Ana de la Reguera		
Rito terminal	Óscar Urrutia			
Sexo por compasión	Laura Mañá			
Sin Dejar Huella	María Novaro	Tiare Scanda, Aitana Sánchez-Gijón		
Su alteza serenísima	Felipe Cazals			
Todo el poder	Fernando Sariñana	Demián Bichir, Cecilia Suárez		
Ancient Evil: Scream of the Mummy	David DeCoteau			Co-production with the United States
Blossoms of Fire	Maureen Gosling, Ellen Osborne		Documentary	
Crocodile	Tobe Hooper			Co-production with the United States
Quiero ser (I want to be...)	Florian Gallenberger			Won an Academy Award for Best Short Subject
