= List of Mexican films of 2002 =

This is a list of Mexican films released in 2002.

== 2002 ==
Title	Director	Cast	Genre	Notes
2002
Acosada (De piel de víbora)	Marcela Fernández Violante			
Amar te duele	Fernando Sariñana	Martha Higareda, Alfonso Herrera		
Aro Tolbukhin. En la mente del asesino	Agustín Villaronga, Isaac Pierre Racine, Lydia Zimmermann			2003 Mexican submission for the Academy Award for Best Foreign Language Film
Ciudades oscuras	Fernando Sariñana			
El crimen del padre Amaro	Carlos Carrera	Gael García Bernal, Ana Claudia Talancón		Academy Award nominee
eXXXorcismos	Jaime Humberto Hermosillo			
Francisca (... De qué lado estás?)	Eva López-Sánchez			
El gavilán de la sierra	Juan Antonio de la Riva			
La habitación azul	Walter Doehner	Arath de la Torre		
Japón	Carlos Reygadas			International Film Festival Bratislava: Grand Prix; Prize of the Ecumenical Jury; Cannes Film Festival: Golden Camera - Special Mention; Edinburgh International Film Festival: New Director's Award; Rio de Janeiro International Film Festival: FIPRESCI Prize; São Paulo International Film Festival: Critics Award - Honorable Mention; Thessaloniki International Film Festival: Best Director; Stockholm International Film Festival: Audience Award.; Havana Film Festival: Best First Work; Tromsø International Film Festival: Aurora Award - Special Mention; Buenos Aires International Festival of Independent Cinema, Best Actor (Alejandro Ferretis); Guadalajara International Film Festival: Best Screenplay; Best Art Direction
Seres humanos	Jorge Aguilera			
El tigre de Santa Julia	Alejandro Gamboa	Miguel Rodarte, Irán Castillo		
Una de dos	Marcel Sisniega			
La virgen de la lujuria	Arturo Ripstein			
Un secreto de Esperanza	Leopoldo Laborde	Katy Jurado, Ana de la Reguera		
Las caras de la luna	Guita Schyfter	Carmen Montejo, Geraldine Chaplin, Ana Torrent, Diana Bracho		
You'll Be Back	Antonio Chavarrías	Tristán Ulloa, Unax Ugalde, Elizabeth Cervantes		

== See also ==
- List of 2002 box office number-one films in Mexico
