= List of Mexican films of 2004 =

This is a list of Mexican films released in 2004.

== 2004 ==
Title	Director	Cast	Genre	Notes
2004
7 mujeres, 1 homosexual y Carlos	René Bueno	Mauricio Ochmann		
Cero y van cuatro	Carlos Carrera			
Desnudos	Enrique Gómez Vadillo			
Digna... hasta el último aliento	Felipe Cazals			
Temporada de patos	Fernando Eimbcke			
La sombra del sahuaro	Eduardo Barraza			
Santos peregrinos	Juan Carlos Carrasco	Carmen Salinas		
Voces inocentes	Luis Mandoki	Ofelia Medina		
Matando Cabos	Alejandro Lozano	Tony Dalton, Ana Claudia Talancón, Kristoff Rasczynsky		
Un diluvio	Eduardo Barraza			
Al otro lado	Gustavo Loza	Adrian Alonso, Carmen Maura, Jorge Milo, Vanessa Bauche		Mexican candidate for the Academy Award for Best Foreign Language Film at the 78th Academy Awards
Club Dread	Jay Chandrasekhar	Broken Lizard, Jay Chandrasekhar, Kevin Heffernan, Steve Lemme, Paul Soter, Erik Stolhanske, Brittany Daniel, Bill Paxton		Co-production with the United States
Soba	Alan Coton	Claudia Soberón, Dagoberto Gama		
Zapata: el sueño del héroe	Alfonso Arau	Alejandro Fernández		

== See also ==
- List of 2004 box office number-one films in Mexico
