= Kilometer 31 =

- Theatrical poster
- Directed by: Rigoberto Castañeda
- Written by: Rigoberto Castañeda
- Produced by: Billy Rovzar; Fernando Rovzar; Julio Fernández
- Starring: Iliana Fox; Adrià Collado; Raúl Méndez; Carlos Aragon
- Cinematography: Alejandro Martínez
- Edited by: Alberto de Toro
- Music by: Carles Cases
- Distributed by: Lemon Films
- Release dates: October 19, 2006 (Morelia Film Festival); February 2, 2007 (Mexico)
- Running time: 103 minutes
- Country: Mexico
- Language: Spanish

Kilometer 31 (Kilómetro 31 or km 31) is a 2006 Mexican supernatural horror film, written and directed by Rigoberto Castañeda. The film is inspired by the Crying Woman legend (La Llorona) and legends about highway ghosts.

== Plot ==
Following a horrible car accident on a rural wooded road near Mexico City, Agata goes into a coma, and her identical twin sister Catalina begins to experience the pain and terror that her comatose sister is going through. Catalina must try to solve the mystery of her sister's accident next to the Km. 31 marker and discovers a local legend that tells of malignant spirits that prowl the road and who are said to prey on travellers. Following a series of terrifying events, Catalina realizes that their link is growing stronger and that her sister is screaming for help from her unconscious state. With the help of her Spanish boyfriend Nuño, Agata's boyfriend Omar, and local detective Martin Ugalde, she discovers that Agata is trapped between life and death, between reality and a terrible netherworld of evil spirits and ancient legend.

== Reception ==
The film was released on February 2 and was on top in the Mexican box office that weekend.

The film was released in select cinemas in the United Kingdom, with English subtitles, on December 7, 2007 after its premiere at the Empire Cinema in Leicester Square on 6 November 2007.

== Sequel ==
KM 31-2: Sin Retorno was released on October 28, 2016, again featuring performances by Carlos Aragón and Iliana Fox and being written and directed once again by Rigoberto Castañeda..

== See also ==
- List of ghost films
