= Mariana Peñalva =

Mexican Biodesigner, transdisciplinary artist & Innovative Entrepreneur

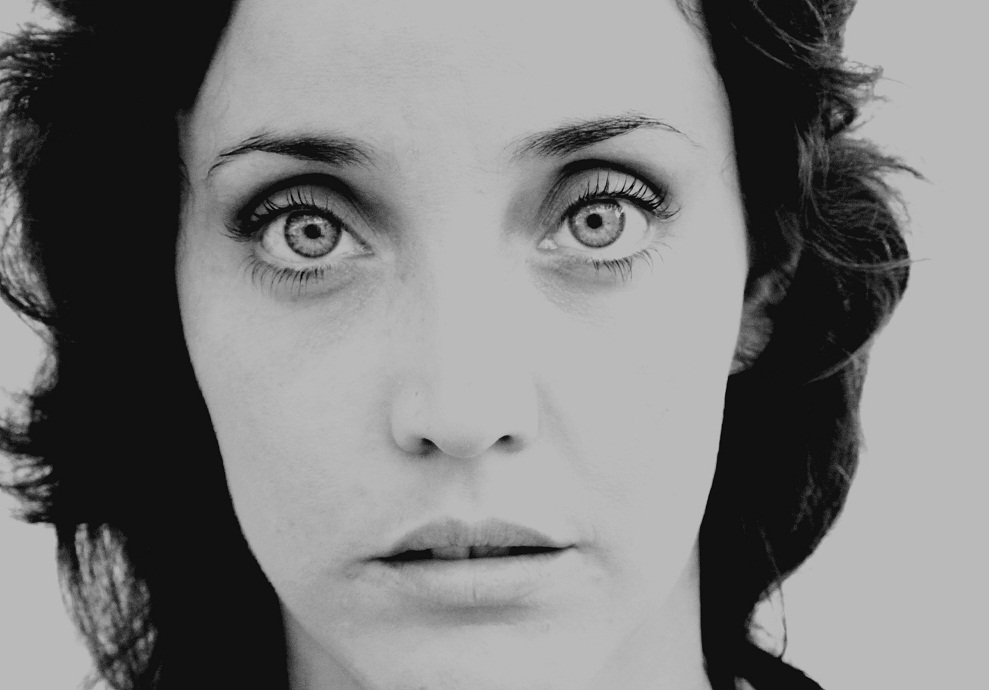
- Peñalva in 2011
- Born: Mariana Dominguez Peñalva; Mexico City, Mexico
- Occupations: Actress, filmmaker and entrepreneur
- Website: mariana-penalva.blogspot.com

Mariana Peñalva (February 20,1979,Mexico City) is a multidisciplinary artist , Founder or Magnificus Films and CEO of the agro-biotechnological start-up Fungus Sapiens.

== Biography ==
Actress Mariana Peñalva was born in Mexico City, daughter of Mexican painter and Mexican opera singer.

== Studies ==
At an early age she moved to Cuernavaca, where she first studied acting with Esther Orozco. By the age of 17 she started her professional acting career with the Mexican Telenovela Mirada de mujer as Andrea, which was a complete success in Mexican television.

Later she studied acting in Centro de formacion Actoral with Héctor Mendoza y Raul Quintanilla.

She also have two MBA degrees (Visual Arts and other in Filmmaking) both from French Universities.

== Acting ==
She got her first approach to films, when she was proposed to be Angelina Jolie's camera double at Original Sin.

In 2000 she travels to Europe and establish in France to finish her degree in Arts, in the almost 4 years she spent in Europe she got the opportunity to work in some Independent Films such as Girl with a Pearl Earring with Scarlett Johansson.

At her return to Mexico she worked in some Mexican television programs like La vida es una Cancion, Heredera, Tormenta en el paraíso and El Pantera.

She also worked in nine short films, some of theme participated in renamed international film festivals around the world. She won an Award as Best Actress for the short film 1956 in the Proyeccion Corta Film Festival in 2010.

In 2007 she got the opportunity to make her first role in the blockbuster Mexican film Tear This Heart Out as Mercedes, working with the renowned Mexican actor Daniel Giménez Cacho and Ana Claudia Talancón with whom she worked again recently at the Mexican TV series Terminales as Vanessa.

In 2008 she obtained her first starring role in the independent film Written in Blood as Nina, where she co-starred with Carlos Ortega and the Uruguayan actress Cecilia Cósero.

She is support actress in the feature film Return, produced and directed by Mexican film director Alejandro González Padilla, where she shares credits along the renowned actor Jaime Camil, Blanca Soto, Daniela Schmidt, Victor Huggo Martin and the Spanish actor Javier Tolosa, this film contested in the 2010 Edition of the New York International Latino Film Festival and earned the Award of the Best Entertaining Picture at the Monaco Charity Film Festival in its 2010 edition.

She moved to France and started acting in two short films and the feature film Bacchanalia a British production filmed in southern France.

== Filmmaking ==
From 2009 to 2011 she produced and co-produced, three short films with her company Fuffá Films Producciones. In self defence based on a story by Guillermo Arriaga, All 4 Nothing starring Silverio Palacios, with 6 nominations from which 2 awards won in the Festival Pantalla de Cristal and her latest co-production in the short " Tell me about meat", directed by Dolores Otero and starring Tenoch Huerta.

From 2014 and 2015 she Produce, write and direct 3 short films with her new Production house Magnificus Films. The short film: Lettres à Steve, Go Vegan, Dehors y La petite porte rouge.

She recently finishing the post-production of her first feature film The strange anatomy of dreams, soon in the film festival circuits. The thirteenth seed is announced to be in development.

== Innovative entrepreneurship ==
Among her interests, besides her acting career and Film-making Mariana Peñalva it’s also involved in science and innovation.

In November 2016 she was invited to give a TEDx Conference to talk about her new Start-up FUNGUS SAPIENS which has noting to do with cinema, but rather Disruptive innovation. Inspired by Biomimicry, Circular economy and The Blue Economy, she developed an agro-biotechnological ecosystem to produce mushrooms and biomaterials made of mushroom mycelium with the aim to fight poverty and pollution.

== Filmography ==
- Baccanalia (2013) .... Randy
- Regresa (2010) .... Isabel
- Written in Blood (2009) .... Nina
- Arrancame la vida (2008) .... Mercedes
- Girl with a Pearl Earring (2002) .... Girl at the church
- Original Sin (2000) .... Angelina Jolie double

== Television ==
- Bienes Raíces (2010) TV Series .... School Director
- Terminales (2008) TV Series .... Vanessa
- El Pantera (2008) TV Series .... Restaurant Manager
- Tormenta en el paraíso (2008) Telenovela ....Joven Micaela
- La vida es una cancion (2004) TV series .... Veronica, Julieta, Angeles, etc.
- Heredera (2004) Telenovela .... Enfermera
- Perla (1997–1998) Telenovela .... Regina
- Mirada de mujer (1997) Telenovela .... Andrea
