= Ángeles Mastretta =

Mexican author and journalist

- Born: October 9, 1949 (age 76); Puebla, Mexico
- Occupations: Journalist, writer, actress, executive producer
- Spouse: Héctor Aguilar Camín
- Writing career
- Language: Spanish
- Subjects: Feminism, Mexican Revolution
- Notable works: Arráncame la vida (Tear This Heart Out), Mal de amores (Lovesick)
- Literary movement: Post-Boom

Ángeles Mastretta (born October 9, 1949) is a Mexican author, journalist, actress, and film producer. She is known for creating inspirational female characters and fictional pieces that reflect the social and political realities of Mexico in her life. She is a recipient of the Rómulo Gallegos Prize and the Mazatlán Prize for Literature for Best Book of the Year. Her book, Arráncame la vida (Tear This Heart Out) was adapted into a movie, which won an Ariel Award in Mexico.

== Background ==
Mastretta began writing as a journalist for a Mexican magazine, Siete and an afternoon newspaper, Ovaciones. She claims that her father – a journalist in his youth – inspired her to be a writer. Her father died when the writer was still very young, but this did not prevent her from following in his footsteps. She later went on to marry writer, Héctor Aguilar Camín.

== Career ==
In 1974, she received a scholarship from the Mexican Writers' Center. She attended the center and was able to work on her writing abilities along with other authors such as Juan Rulfo, Salvador Elizondo, and Francisco Monterde. After a year of working at the Mexican Writers' Center, a collection of Mastretta's poetry entitled La pájara pinta (The Colorful Bird) was published in 1978.

Mastretta really wanted to focus on a novel that she had been thinking about for years. She finally got her chance to work on this novel when an editor offered to sponsor Mastretta on a six-month leave of absence, allowing her to focus solely on writing. She took the offer and ended up embarking on a sabbatical to complete Arráncame la vida (Tear This Heart Out). The novel (published in 1985) was an immediate success, and earned her the Mazatlán Prize for Literature for Best Book of the Year.

Arráncame la vida was a critical and popular success in Mexico and abroad. As a result, Mastretta was able to focus more on her fiction-writing passion. The film of the same name and based upon the novel was released in September 2008.

Mastretta won the Rómulo Gallegos Prize for her 1996 novel, Mal de Amores (Lovesick).

When her infant daughter unexpectedly fell ill, Mastretta sat next to her child in the hospital and began to tell stories of interesting and different women in her family who were important to her in critical moments of her life. These stories of women who "decided their own destinies" became the inspiration for Mujeres de ojos grandes (Women with Big Eyes) (published in 1990). The publication — autobiographical narratives based on each of the women – was intended to preserve the stories for posterity.

Verdadero

Mastretta has also contributed to the film industry as both an actress and a producer. She worked as an actress and a producer in the 2008 short film, Tabacotla where she played the role of Verónica. In the same year she worked on the film based on her novel, Tear This Heart Out. The film, Tear This Heart Out went on to win 6 awards and 3 nominations. In 2009 Mastretta was awarded at the Ariel Awards in Mexico with Best Screenplay Adapted from Another Source alongside director Roberto Sneider.

Although journalism is not her main focus like it was when she first started her career as a writer, Mastretta still actively contributes to newspaper, El País, and magazine NEXOS, which was founded by her husband Héctor Aguilar Camín.

== Tear This Heart Out ==
After a poor translation titled Mexican Bolero, this novel was translated by Margaret Sayers Peden, as Tear This Heart Out. This novel was Mastretta's first text translated to English, therefore her debut into the English literature scene. The novel explores the life of Catalina Guzman, and takes place in Puebla, Mexico, the city where Mastretta was born. Mastretta uses her experiences as a little girl in Puebla to create the scene for the novel. The book takes place during, and after, the Mexican Revolution, and focuses on Catalina's difficult life married to a political figure, and philanderer, who commits murders of his enemies. Mastretta points out the political infighting of the post-Revolution period, and patriarchal system in Mexico. Catalina's character develops into a force of resistance against machismo and sets the tone for Mastretta's future texts including strong female protagonists. Her subsequent novel, Mal de amores (1996), in translation as Lovesick, is an extensive view of social involvement during and following the significant Revolution of 1910. Her protagonist here, like many other women, accompanies the rebels as they travel on the trains, administers to their wounds as a curandera (important role in small communities, as a healer), and after the war studies in the US to become a medical doctor and returns to the city where she grew up. This novel received the prestigious Romulo Gallegos award (similar to the Pulitzer), making her the first woman in Latin America to receive the award.

== Lovesick ==
Published in 1996, six years after her debut novel, Mastretta takes a similar approach to Tear This Heart Out. She sets the novel in Puebla, Mexico once again, and uses the Mexican Revolution as her temporal space. Her main character Emilia Suari, takes on the role that Mastretta is well known for characterizing, a strong independent woman. Following the trend of her past writing, Mastretta focuses on the social and political problems that are relevant to Mexico at the time.

== Puerto libre ==
=== Fe y quimera ===
This chapter of Puerto libre focuses on how and who writes and expresses fiction. She emphasizes the necessary characteristics that a person needs to hold in order to write fiction. A main point she develops throughout this chapter is the connection between fiction as a genre, reality, and the truth. She presents all of these concepts as thing that can be easily manipulated and constructed depending on who is behind the action.

=== Guiso feminista ===
This chapter of Puerto libre clearly states Mastretta's position as a feminist woman writer. She allows spaces, specifically the kitchen and an office space, to represent the constraints women must face due to societal norms. Using two characters, Marichu and Pepón, Mastretta points out the oppression that women struggle with when they are obligated to take on traditional and domestic roles, mainly providing for their husbands and family. Mastretta highlights the freedom that writing provides women, and how feminism can only be fostered in specific environments, out of reach from societal pressures. She emphasizes the idea that feminism is something instinctive for women, and that society is what makes it difficult to further develop.

== Works ==
=== Novels ===
- Arráncame la vida (Tear This Heart) (1985)
- Mal de Amores (Lovesick) (1996)
- Ninguna eternidad como la mía (No Eternity Like Mine) (1999)

=== Short stories ===
- Mujeres de ojos grandes (Women with Big Eyes) (1985)
- Maridos (Husbands) (2007)
- “El viento de las horas” (2015)

=== Memoirs ===
- Puerto libre (Free port) (1993)
- El mundo iluminado (The Illuminated World) (1998)
- El cielo de los leones (2003)
- La emoción de las cosas (2012)

== Filmography ==
- Tabacotla (2008), Véronica
- Tear This Heart Out (2009), executive producer
- Hecho en México (2012), as Ángeles Mastretta
