= Lotería Loca =

American game show

- Genre: Game show
- Created by: Jeff Apploff; Aaron Solomon; Alejandro Trevino
- Directed by: Diccon Ramsay
- Presented by: Jaime Camil; Sheila E.
- Country of origin: United States
- Original language: English
- No. of seasons: 1
- No. of episodes: 6

Production
- Executive producers: Jaime Camil; Jeff Apploff; Aaron Solomon; Alejandro Trevino; Mike Darnell; Dan Sacks; Bridgette Theriault
- Production location: Madrid, Spain
- Editor: Timothy Schultz
- Production companies: Warner Horizon Unscripted Television; Apploff Entertainment

Original release
- Network: CBS
- Release: October 2 – December 24, 2023

Lotería Loca is an American television game show based on the Mexican game of chance Lotería. The show is hosted by Jaime Camil, with Sheila E. serving as co-host and band leader. The show aired from October 2, 2023 until December 24, 2023 on CBS. It was removed from the schedule after airing six of its 11 recorded episodes, leaving the other five unaired.

Each episode features two contestants attempting to match symbols found on their Lotería tablero. The first player to complete two lines on their tablero advances to the final round in an attempt to win $1,000,000.

== Gameplay ==
=== Mano a Mano ===
Each contestant is given their own Lotería tablero consisting of nine cards arranged in a 3-by-3 grid. Starting with the winner of a backstage coin toss, contestants alternate selecting one numbered square at a time from a board of 15. Hidden behind each square is a different Lotería card with a dollar value ranging from $1,000 to $5,000 in $500 increments, and every card appears on one or both tableros. If the selected card is on only one contestant's tablero, it is marked off and that contestant banks the money associated with it. If a card appearing on both tableros is uncovered, both contestants mark it off but the money goes only to the contestant who selected it.

Hidden behind several squares are “Loca Challenges,” minigames that range from physical stunts to musical performances. The challenge is presented in three parts, awarding $2,500 for completing one part, $5,000 for two, or $10,000 for all three. Once the challenge is completed, the card behind it is revealed and marked/scored as above.

A contestant earns a Lotería and a $10,000 bonus for completing a horizontal, vertical, or diagonal line of three cards. The first contestant to earn two Loterías wins the game and takes their winnings to the bonus round. If a contestant earns multiple Loterías in one turn, they receive $10,000 for each one and immediately win the game.

=== Million Dollar Lotería ===
The champion is given a new tablero, consisting of 16 cards in a 4-by-4 grid, and faces a board of 20 numbered squares.

As in the main game, the champion selects one square at a time. Behind 16 of the squares are Lotería cards, all of which can be found on the tablero. The dollar values hidden behind the cards now range from $2,000 to $10,000. Loca Challenges are still hidden on the board, now consisting of five parts; the contestant earns $2,000 for each of the first four parts completed, or $20,000 for all five.

Four skull cards are also hidden on the board; each time the champion uncovers one, their bank is cut in half. Finding all four skulls ends the game immediately and forfeits the entire bank. If three skulls are found, the champion is offered a chance to end the game at that point and keep half their remaining winnings.

The champion must mark off a line of four cards in order to earn a Lotería, which awards a $25,000 bonus. Earning a Lotería also gives the champion the chance to either end the game and keep all winnings, or continue to play. In the latter case, they must continue to choose numbers until either earning another Lotería or uncovering three skulls (or the fourth one, if the contestant has already found three).

Marking off all 16 cards on the tablero increases the champion's winnings to $1,000,000.

== Production ==
On May 4, 2023, it was announced that CBS had ordered the series. On August 3, 2023, it was announced that the series would premiere on October 2, 2023, airing as part of a CBS fall schedule impacted by the 2023 Hollywood labor disputes.

Camil—who served as host and co-executive producer alongside veteran game show producer Jeff Apploff—stated that he hoped the series would "resonate tremendously with an underserved audience" of Hispanic viewers, noting that he had frequently played Lotería with his friends and family in Mexico, and considered it "an every night kind of thing" in Latin American communities. The set design was inspired by rural Mexican villages; Camil explained that he didn't want the studio to look "like a waiting area at a Señor Frog's when you go to spring break", and had suggested that the production team visit one of Mexico's Pueblos Mágicos for inspiration.

Amid low viewership (never receiving a household rating above 0.2, and the October 30 episode having a series-low of 1.1 million viewers), CBS pulled Loteria Loca from its schedule on October 31, 2023, filling its remaining timeslots with NCIS encores and Let's Make a Deal primetime specials. Besides a holiday-themed episode airing on December 24, 2023, the remaining five episodes have not been aired.

== Episodes ==
No.	Title	Original release date	Prod. code	U.S. viewers (millions)	Rating (18-49)
1	"Series Premiere"	October 2, 2023	101	1.75	0.2
2	"A Million Dollars Is In The Cards"	October 9, 2023	106	1.62	0.2
3	"¡Más Dinero!"	October 16, 2023	107	1.31	0.1
4	"A Loteria Salute to Teachers"	October 23, 2023	108	1.39	0.2
5	"Día de los Muertos"	October 30, 2023	104	1.05	0.1
6	"Happy Holidays"	December 24, 2023	112	0.87	0.1
7	"A Night of Heroes"	Unaired	105	N/A	TBA
8	"Battle of the Ages"	Unaired	109	N/A	TBA
9	"What a Bunch of Bologna"	Unaired	102	N/A	TBA
10	"Million Dollar Goooooooooooooooollll"	Unaired	103	N/A	TBA
11	"Battle of the High Rollers"	Unaired	110	N/A	TBA

== Reception ==
=== Critical response ===
Andy Dehnart felt that while Lotería Loca was "lively and vibrant in a way few American game shows are", he felt that the format itself was shallow due to being almost entirely based on luck, and felt that the Loca Challenges needed to provide more benefits to the player and have more variety.
