= Alcian Blue (band) =

US musical group

- Origin: Takoma Park, Maryland, United States
- Genres: Shoegaze, new wave
- Years active: 1998–2006
- Labels: Safranin Sound, Elephant Stone
- Formerly of: Screen Vinyl Image, Vacuole Eyes, the Antiques, Torsion Fields
- Past members: Sam Chintha; Jake Reid; Clark Stacy; Matt Welch; Kim Reid
- Website: www.alcianblue.net/

Alcian Blue was an American shoegaze and new wave-influenced band operating out of the Washington, D.C. suburb of Takoma Park from 1998 to 2006. They were known for their extremely loud wall of sound live aesthetic, coupled with the use of disorienting video projections.

== History ==
The band initially consisted of guitarists Sam Chintha and Jake Reid, drummer Clark Stacy, and bassist Matt Welch. Recording and self-releasing the full-length album Slow Colorless Stare (2001) and several EPs, they honed their characteristic sound by relentlessly experimenting with DIY recording techniques and effect boxes. They toured extensively with fellow East Coast shoegaze bands such as A Place to Bury Strangers, Skywave and the Emerald Down.

In April 2004, Stacy left the band to join the Air Force. The band decided to continue, using drum machines and adding Reid's future wife Kim Dodd on synthesizers and extra guitar. This sudden change in the group dynamic resulted in a new sound featuring synths and drum machine more prominently, as heard on their eponymous second album, released in July 2006 by Elephant Stone Records. The band toured extensively with the new lineup prior to the release of the record and developed a cult regional and worldwide fanbase.

The band decided to part ways in September 2006 to pursue new projects and new sounds. In 2007, they posthumously released an EP, Years Too Late, consisting of songs culled from older recordings.

== Other projects ==
Jake and Kim Reid went on to operate the independent label Safranin Sound and form the core of the band Screen Vinyl Image.

Chintha worked on music under the moniker Vacuole Eyes and played with the Antiques.

Welch and Chintha also played in Torsion Fields with John Wood of A Cricket in Times Square, among others.

== Discography ==
=== Studio albums ===
- Slow Colorless Stare CD (2001, Safranin Sound)
- Alcian Blue CD (2006, Elephant Stone)

=== Singles and EPs ===
- Angelica Take Me Down EP (2003, Safranin Sound)
- Translucent EP (2004, Safranin Sound)
- Silvers Sleep Walk EP (2004, Safranin Sound)
- Fall Behind EP (2005, Safranin Sound)
- "You Just Disappear" single (2005, Safranin Sound)
- Years Too Late EP (2007, Safranin Sound)

=== Compilation appearances ===
- "Channel" on Blisscent 1 (2002, Blisscent Records)
- "Grave Water" on Test Tones Volume 04 (2004, Clairecords)
