= Lotería =

Traditional game of chance

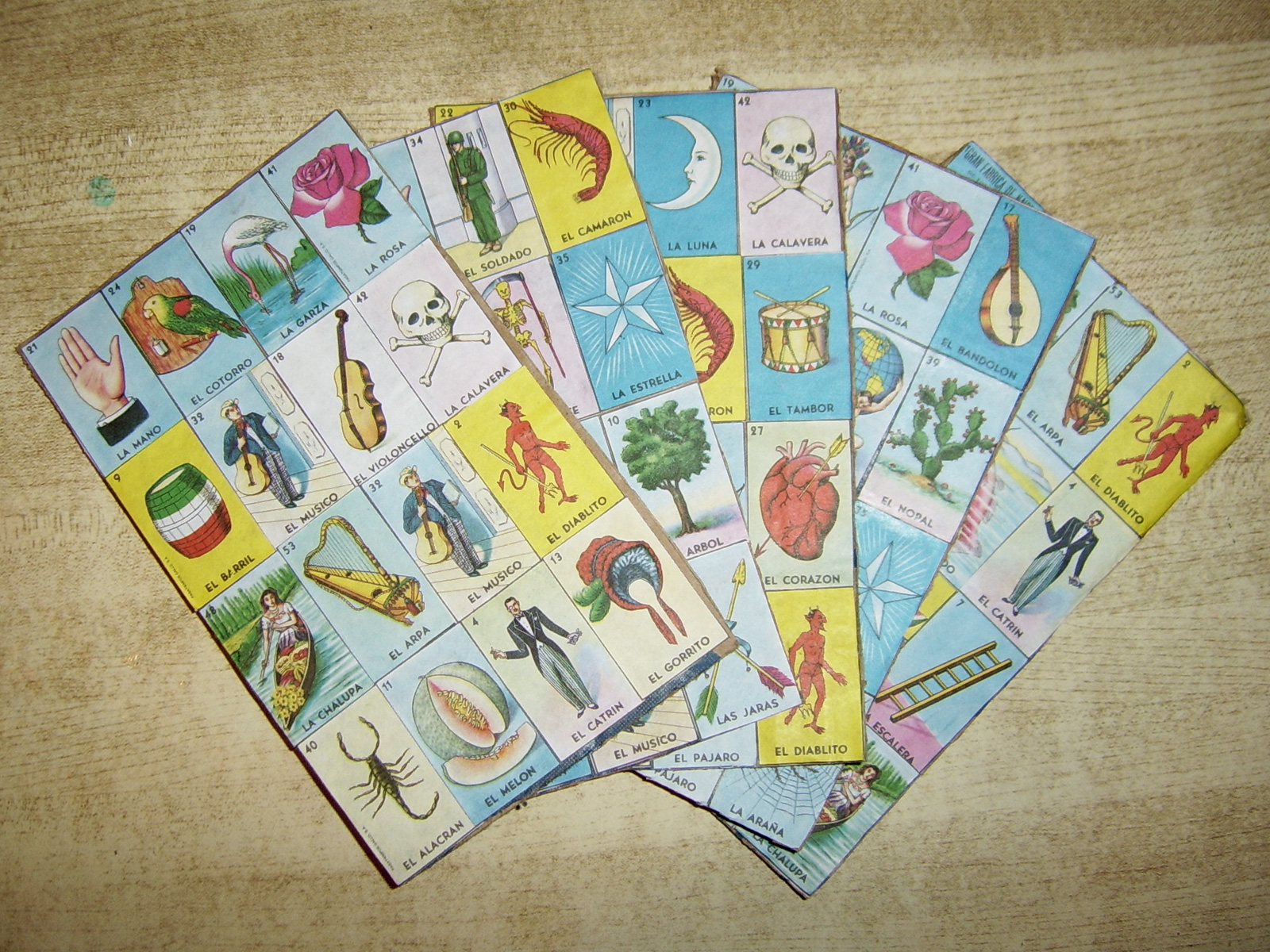
- Lotería boards
- Other names: Mexican bingo, Chalupa
- Languages: Spanish
- Chance: High
- Materials required: cards

Lotería (Spanish word meaning "lottery") is a traditional Mexican board game of chance, similar to bingo, but played with a deck of cards instead of numbered balls. Each card has an image of an object, its name, and a number, although the number is usually ignored. Each player has at least one tabla, a board with a randomly created 4 × 4 grid selected from the card images. Players choose a tabla ("board") to play with, from a variety of previously created tablas, each with a different selection of images.

The traditional Lotería card deck is composed of 54 different cards, each with a different picture. To start the game, the caller (cantor, "singer") shuffles the deck. One by one, the caller picks a card from the deck and announces it to the players by its name, sometimes using a verse before reading the card name. Each player locates the matching pictogram of the card just announced on their board and marks it off with a chip or other kind of marker. In Mexico, it is traditional to use pennies, crown corks or pinto beans as markers. The winner is the first player that shouts "¡Lotería!" after marking all the images in their tabla, or completing a pattern on it, similar to bingo: row, column, diagonal, four corners, or unique to this game, four in a square (pozo).

== History ==
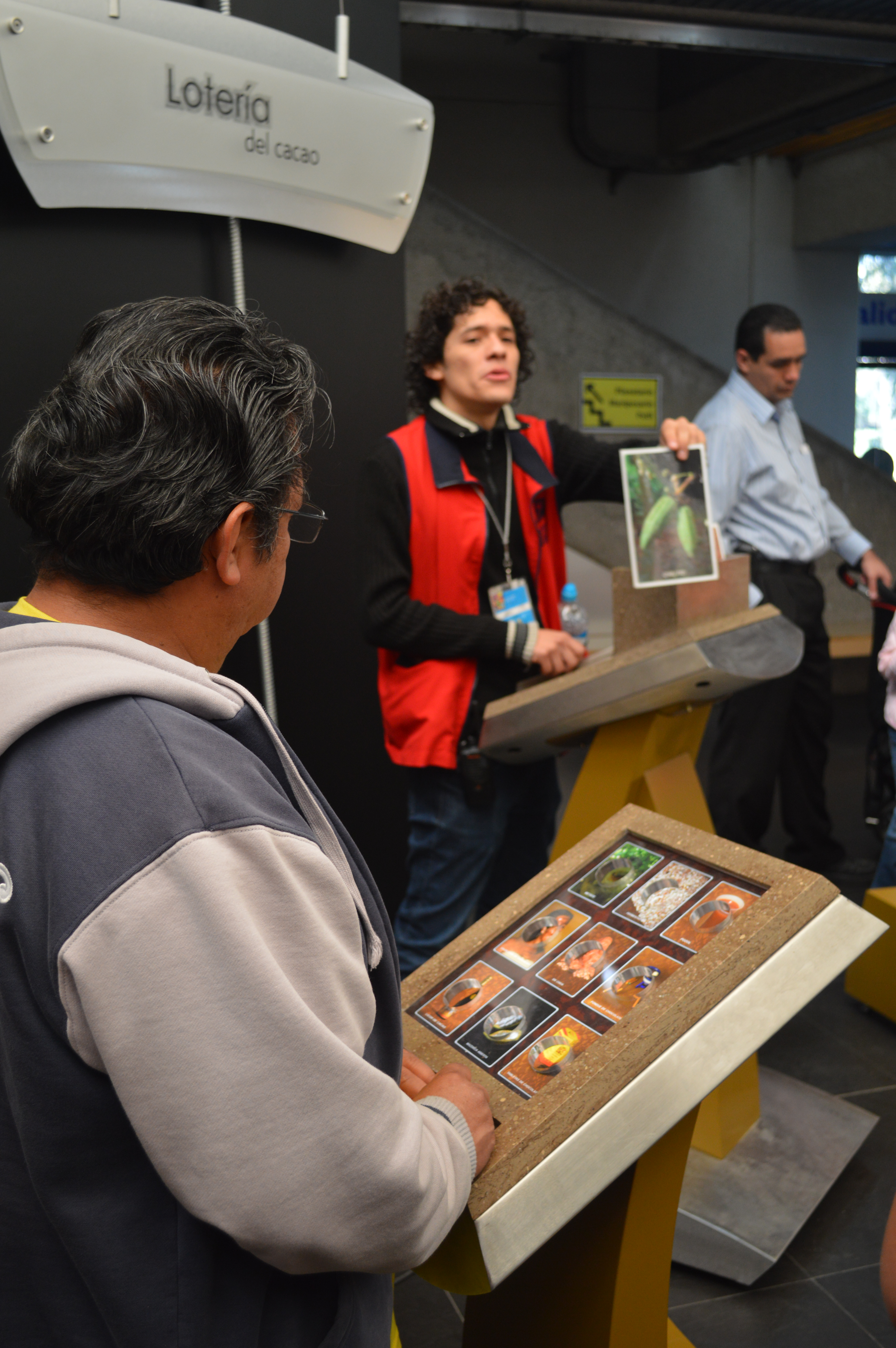
Lotería game based on cacao being played at the Universum museum in Mexico City

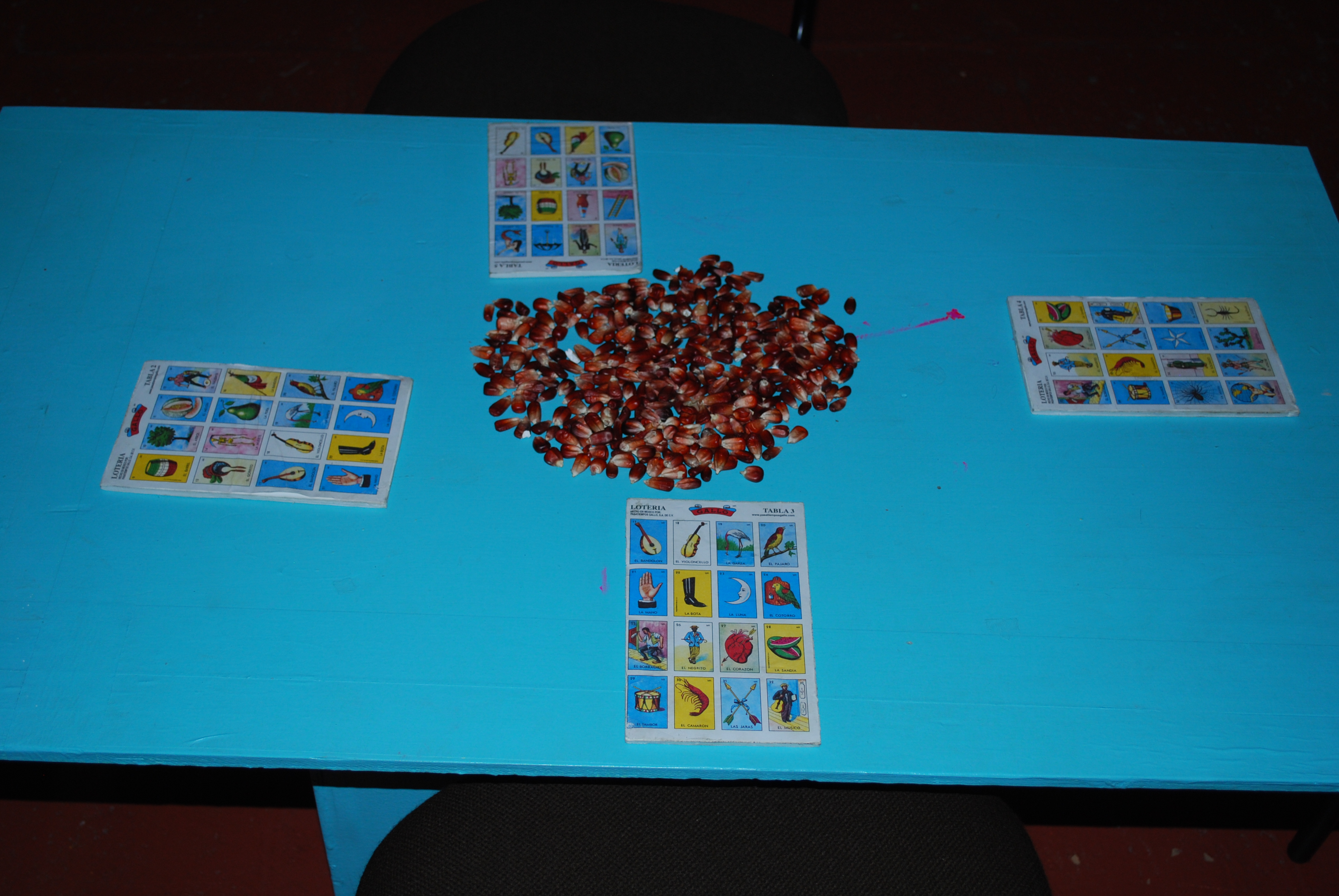
Set up of a lotería game at the Museo de Culturas Populares in Toluca

Animation showing traditional ways to win

The game of lotería can be traced far back in history. The game originated in Italy in the 15th century and was brought to New Spain, in 1769. In the beginning, lotería was a hobby of the upper classes, but eventually it became a tradition at Mexican fairs.

Don Clemente Jacques began publishing the game in 1887. His version of the game was distributed to Mexican soldiers along with their rations and supplies.

The images Don Clemente used in his card designs have become iconic in Mexican culture, as well as gaining popularity in the U.S. and some European countries. Don Clemente's cards also had a part in representing and normalizing different aspects of Mexico's national identity during the 19th century. This can be seen with the card of El Soldado ("the soldier"), which was used as a symbol to reference war as a part of Mexico's national identity during that time. Many of the pictures used in Don Clemente's lotería resemble the Major Arcana of Tarot cards used for divination (which, in turn, are based on cards used in Tarot card games). Other popular lotería sets are Lotería Leo, Gacela and Lotería de mi tierra.

== Alternative versions ==
Lotería de Pozo is a variant version of the traditional Mexican Lotería, where the basic rules apply. For this version, before the game begins, players agree on how many pozos are to be completed in a row, column or diagonal pattern. A pozo is a group of images in a square. The square may contain 2 x 2 (4) or 3 x 3 (9) images for a traditional tabla.

During the 1930s, the Roman Catholic church devised its own version of la lotería, most likely because of the connections between Don Clemente's popular images and Tarot cards; divination and fortune-telling are prohibited by Catholic doctrine. This alternative lotería deck consisted of Catholic images instead of the traditional images used in the original game, likely allowing devout Catholics a way to enjoy the game without those "sinful" connotations and giving the Church a way to teach its beliefs by way of the lotería.

With the rise of online gaming and app-based gaming, electronic versions such as the Loteria online game allow computer users to play an online version of the Lotería Mexicana.

== Cards and associated verses ==
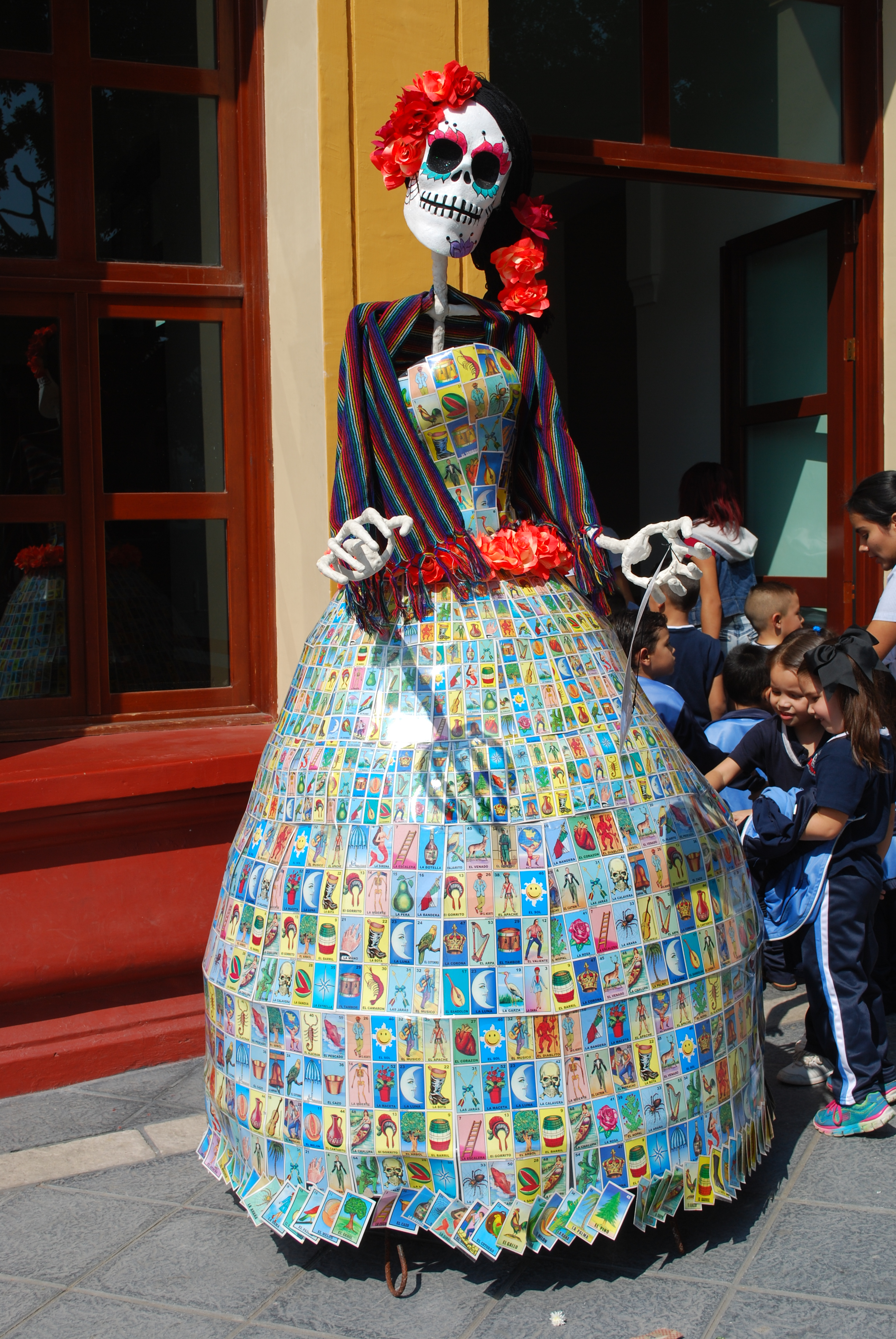
Catrina in Chapala, Jalisco with dress of lotería cards

The following is a list of the original 54 lotería cards, traditionally and broadly recognized in Mexico. Along with each card name and number are the verses sometimes used to tell the players which card was drawn. However, there are several less traditional sets of cards, depicting different objects or animals.

No.	Name	English	Verse	Translation
1	El gallo	the rooster	El que le cantó a San Pedro no le volverá a cantar.	The one that sang for St. Peter will never sing for him again.
2	El diablito	the little Devil	Pórtate bien cuatito, si no te lleva el coloradito.	Behave yourself buddy, or the little red one will take you away.
3	La dama	the lady	Puliendo el paso, por toda la calle real.	Improving her gait, all along the main street.
4	El catrín	the dandy	Don Ferruco en la alameda, su bastón quería tirar.	Sir Ferruco in the poplar grove, wanted to toss away his cane.
5	El paraguas	the umbrella	Para el sol y para el agua.	For the sun and for the rain.
6	La sirena	the mermaid	Con los cantos de sirena, no te vayas a marear.	Don't be swayed by the songs of the siren. (In Spanish, sirens and mermaids and their song are synonymous.)
7	La escalera	the ladder	Súbeme paso a pasito, no quieras pegar brinquitos.	Ascend me step by step, don't try and skip.
8	La botella	the bottle	La herramienta del borracho.	The tool of the drunk.
9	El barril	the barrel	Tanto bebió el albañil, que quedó como barril.	So much did the bricklayer drink, he ended up like a barrel.
10	El árbol	the tree	El que a buen árbol se arrima, buena sombra le cobija.	He who nears a good tree, is blanketed by good shade.
11	El melón	the melon	Me lo das o me lo quitas.	Give it to me or take it from me.
12	El valiente	the brave man	Por qué le corres cobarde, trayendo tan buen puñal.	Why do you run, coward? Having such a good blade too.
13	El gorrito	the little bonnet	Ponle su gorrito al nene, no se nos vaya a resfriar.	Put the bonnet on the baby, lest he catch a cold.
14	La muerte	Death	La muerte tilica y flaca.	Death, thin and lanky.
15	La pera	the pear	El que espera, desespera.	He who waits despairs. (A pun: espera "waits" and es pera "is a pear" are homophones in Mexican Spanish.)
16	La bandera	the flag	Verde blanco y colorado, la bandera del soldado.	Green, white, and red, the flag of the soldier.
17	El bandolón	the mandolin	Tocando su bandolón, está el mariachi Simón.	There playing his lute, is Simon the mariachi.
18	El violoncello	the cello	Creciendo se fue hasta el cielo, y como no fue violín, tuvo que ser violoncello.	Growing it reached the heavens, and since it wasn't a violin, it had to be a cello.
19	La garza	the heron	Al otro lado del río tengo mi banco de arena, donde se sienta mi chata pico de garza morena.	At the other side of the river I have my sand bank, where sits my darling short one, with the beak of a great blue heron.
20	El pájaro	the bird	Tu me traes a puros brincos, como pájaro en la rama.	You have me hopping here and there, like a bird on a branch.
21	La mano	the hand	La mano de un criminal.	The hand of a criminal.
22	La bota	the boot	Una bota igual que la otra.	A boot the same as the other.
23	La luna	the moon	El farol de los enamorados.	The street lamp of lovers.
24	El cotorro	the parrot	Cotorro cotorro saca la pata, y empiézame a platicar.	Parrot, parrot, stick out your claw and begin to chat with me.
25	El borracho	the drunkard	A qué borracho tan necio ya no lo puedo aguantar.	Oh what an annoying drunk, I can't stand him any more.
26	El negrito	the little black man	El que se comió el azúcar.	The one who ate the sugar.
27	El corazón	the heart	No me extrañes corazón, que regreso en el camión.	Do not miss me, sweetheart, I'll be back by bus.
28	La sandía	the watermelon	La barriga que Juan tenía, era empacho de sandía.	The swollen belly that Juan had, was from eating too much watermelon.
29	El tambor	the drum	No te arrugues, cuero viejo, que te quiero pa' tambor.	Don't you wrinkle, dear old leather, since I want you for a drum.
30	El camarón	the shrimp	Camarón que se duerme, se lo lleva la corriente.	The shrimp that slumbers is taken by the tides.
31	Las jaras	the arrows	Las jaras del indio Adán, donde pegan, dan.	The arrows of Adam the Indian, strike where they hit.
32	El músico	the musician	El músico trompas de hule, ya no me quiere tocar.	The rubber-lipped musician does not want to play for me anymore.
33	La araña	the spider	Atarántamela a palos, no me la dejes llegar.	Beat it silly with a stick, do not let it near me.
34	El soldado	the soldier	Uno, dos y tres, el soldado pa'l cuartel.	One, two and three, the soldier heads to the fort.
35	La estrella	the star	La guía de los marineros.	Sailor's guide.
36	El cazo	the saucepan	El caso que te hago es poco.	The attention I pay you is little. (A pun: caso "attention" and cazo "saucepan" are homophones in Mexican Spanish)
37	El mundo	the world	Este mundo es una bola, y nosotros un bolón.	This world is a ball, and we a great mob. (A pun: bola can mean both "ball, sphere" and "crowd, mob", bolón is a superlative with the latter meaning)
38	El Apache	the Apache	¡Ah, Chihuahua! Cuánto apache con pantalón y huarache.	Ah, Chihuahua! So many Apaches with pants and sandals.
39	El nopal	the prickly pear cactus	Al nopal lo van a ver, nomás cuando tiene tunas.	People go to see the prickly pear, only when it bears fruit.
40	El alacrán	the scorpion	El que con la cola pica, le dan una paliza.	He who stings with his tail, will get a beating.
41	La rosa	the rose	Rosita, Rosaura, ven que te quiero ahora.	Rosita, Rosaura, come, as I want you here now.
42	La calavera	the skull	Al pasar por el panteón, me encontré un calaverón.	As I passed by the cemetery, I came across a skull.
43	La campana	the bell	Tú con la campana y yo con tu hermana.	You with the bell and I with your sister.
44	El cantarito	the little water pitcher	Tanto va el cántaro al agua, que se quiebra y te moja las enaguas.	So often does the jug go to the water, that it breaks and wets your slip.
45	El venado	the deer	Saltando va buscando, pero no ve nada.	Jumping it goes searching, but it doesn't see anything. (A pun: venado "deer" sounds like ve nada "see nothing")
46	El Sol	the sun	La cobija de los pobres.	The blanket of the poor.
47	La corona	the crown	El sombrero de los reyes.	The hat of kings.
48	La chalupa	the canoe	Rema que rema Lupita, sentada en su chalupita.	Lupita rows as she may, sitting in her little boat.
49	El pino	the pine tree	Fresco y oloroso, en todo tiempo hermoso.	Fresh and fragrant, beautiful in any season.
50	El pescado	the fish	El que por la boca muere, aunque mudo fuere.	The one who dies by its mouth, even if he were mute. (In reference to a fish being hooked by its mouth, even though it doesn't utter a sound.)
51	La palma	the palm tree	Palmero, sube a la palma y bájame un coco real.	Palmer, climb the palm tree and bring me a coconut fit for kings. (Lit: "A royal coconut.
52	La maceta	the flowerpot	El que nace pa'maceta, no sale del corredor.	He who is born to be a flowerpot, does not go beyond the hallway.
53	El arpa	the harp	Arpa vieja de mi suegra, ya no sirves pa'tocar.	Old harp of my mother-in-law, you are no longer fit to play.
54	La rana	the frog	Al ver a la verde rana, qué brinco pegó tu hermana.	What a jump your sister gave, as she saw the green frog.

== In popular culture ==
Lotería was played multiple times in the satirical telenovela Jane the Virgin.

In 2017, artist Mike Alfaro created Millennial Lotería, reimagining the game for a millennial audience with new cards such as "La hashtag", "La feminist" and "La selfie".

On December 9, 2019, Google celebrated Lotería with a Google Doodle. The doodle was a game of lotería that could be played with online players. Some new cards are added: El buscador ("the search engine"), El ajolote ("the axolotl"), El emoji ("the emoji"), etc.

In July 2021, Netflix announced a film adaptation based around the game with James Bobin set to direct and Eugenio Derbez in a leading role.

On October 2, 2023, a game show based on lotería premiered on CBS, titled Lotería Loca and hosted by Jaime Camil. On each episode, two contestants compete for a chance to win up to $1 million.

== See also ==
- Bài Chòi – a Bingo game from Vietnam that also use cards and a singer
