= Regresa (film) =

- Directed by: Alejandro González Padilla
- Written by: Monica Abin, Alejandro González Padilla
- Starring: Jaime Camil, Blanca Soto
- Production company: Producciones X Marca
- Release date: 22 January 2010
- Running time: 92 minutes
- Country: Mexico
- Languages: Spanish & Basque

Regresa is a 2010 Mexican romantic comedy film directed by Alejandro González Padilla and starring Jaime Camil and Blanca Soto. It won best film at the 2010 Monaco Charity Film Festival. The comedy concerns a wife who is regressed in hypnotherapy to a previous life as a 15th-century Basque girl, but then will not snap out of this identity. The film has the Basque language byline "Asko maite zaitut" - "I love you very much". The story has a distant connection with Malayalam horror romantic comedy film Manichitrathaazhu, which was dubbed almost all Indian and some foreign languages.

== Plot ==
The movie is about husband and wife, who ultimately long for each other's love. It starts with 3 friends, who discuss about their daily life and for instance start discussing about "Regresa" (English: "Comeback") the two friends "Pato " and "Isabel" convince their friend "Maria" to visit a Certified Therapist "Olga" to know about her past life, for which Maria is not reluctant. Pato suspects that Maria 's husband "Ernesto" is having an affair and that Maria should hire a lawyer or detective. They got to ride on their horses, saddling back to return to the castle.

Maria visits the Doctor Olga and after the session over, Maria doesn't return to Present Life, which makes Doctor nervous later "Maria" screams and doesn't remember any of her friends. After finding Maria's sensuality to fit inside of her dreams, Ernesto finds out if she had a sexual feeling about him. Isabel tries to call Maria 's husband but is unable to connect to him later when he receives, he is shocked to know that his wife is admitted to hospital and is tied up, Doctors are confused about her condition and record what she says while screaming, which later is partially interpreted as a "Basque" language. While Adolfo met Ernesto, they came to meet for the royalty for the Spanish colonization during the Spanish Empire.

Ernesto and Adolfo (Isabel husband) visit Spanish Embassy for a translator but end up with " Inaki"Javier Tolosa a chef, who helps them to interpret, and is shocked when Maria reveals herself as a Princess of "Kingdom of Navare" of 15th Century and is about to marry a Prince, and is frightened to see the electronic Gadgets around her, and believes that some witch has placed her into the present era, later Ernesto takes Maria to a village and instructs the maids to remove all electronic items. Suddenly, Ernesto and Maria are finally safe.

With the help of Inaki, he tries to win her back.

== Cast ==
- Jaime Camil as Ernesto
- Blanca Soto as his wife María
- Mariana Peñalva Isabel
- Jorge Zárate Dr. Rodriguez
- Javier Tolosa Inaki
- Daniela Schmidt Pato
- Víctor Huggo Martin Adolfo as Isabel Husband
- Mónica Huarte Olga.

Release The film was released nearly to coincide with the celebrations of the 200th anniversary of Mexican independence.

== Awards ==
Mexico City International Film Festival
