= A Cricket in Times Square =

Four-piece rock band formed in College Park, Maryland in 2000

A Cricket in Times Square is a four-piece rock band formed in College Park, Maryland in 2000 at the University of Maryland's radio station WMUC-FM.

The band was started in 2000 by members John Wood and Michael Tyler, splitting the songwriting duties, vocals, and guitar parts, with many important contributors joining them along the way.

The first lineup (2000–2002) featured Bryan Smith on bass, and Sam Chintha of the band Alcian Blue drumming. Adam Robinson (who also plays bass in the band Georgie James as well) and Eric Swartz replaced Smith and Chintha prior to the recording of the band's self-titled debut album. The seven-song by debut released by the High Two label in 2004. David Fricke of Rolling Stone called the record "particularly impressive" was comparing A Cricket in Times Square to Ride, Sonic Youth, and The Church.

In 2004, the band relocated to Seattle, Washington enlisting two new members, Dominic Senibaldi and Dino DeJesus. Contributors to the band also include Matt Welch of the band Alcian Blue. Tyler now also plays in the band Alias Linn. Wood and Chintha also collaborate in the band Torsion Fields.

A Cricket in Times Square's song "5.5-Minute Hallway" is featured in the film Alone with Her starring Colin Hanks.

== Discography ==
- A Cricket in Times Square – 2004
