= Sueño (film) =

- Directed by: Renée Chabria
- Written by: Renée Chabria
- Produced by: Juan Manuel Castruita; Marc Forster; Eric Kopeloff; Robert Ortiz
- Starring: John Leguizamo; Ana Claudia Talancón; Elizabeth Peña
- Cinematography: Eric Moynier
- Edited by: Lori Ball
- Music by: Doug DeAngelis; Ruy Folguera
- Distributed by: Destination Films
- Release date: July 2005
- Running time: 108 minutes
- Country: United States
- Languages: English; Spanish

Sueño (lit. 'Dream') is a 2005 comedy-drama film directed by Renée Chabria and starring John Leguizamo, Ana Claudia Talancón, and Elizabeth Peña.

== Cast ==
- John Leguizamo as Antonio
- Ana Claudia Talancón as Nina
- Elizabeth Peña as Mirabela
- Nestor Serrano as El Zorro
- José María Yazpik as Pancho
- Jsu Garcia as Rafael
