= Universum (UNAM) =

Science museum in Mexico City

Coordinates: 19°18′41.06″N 99°10′50.39″W

Universum, the Museum of Science of the National Autonomous University of Mexico
- Universum, el Museo de las Ciencias de la Universidad Nacional Autónoma de México
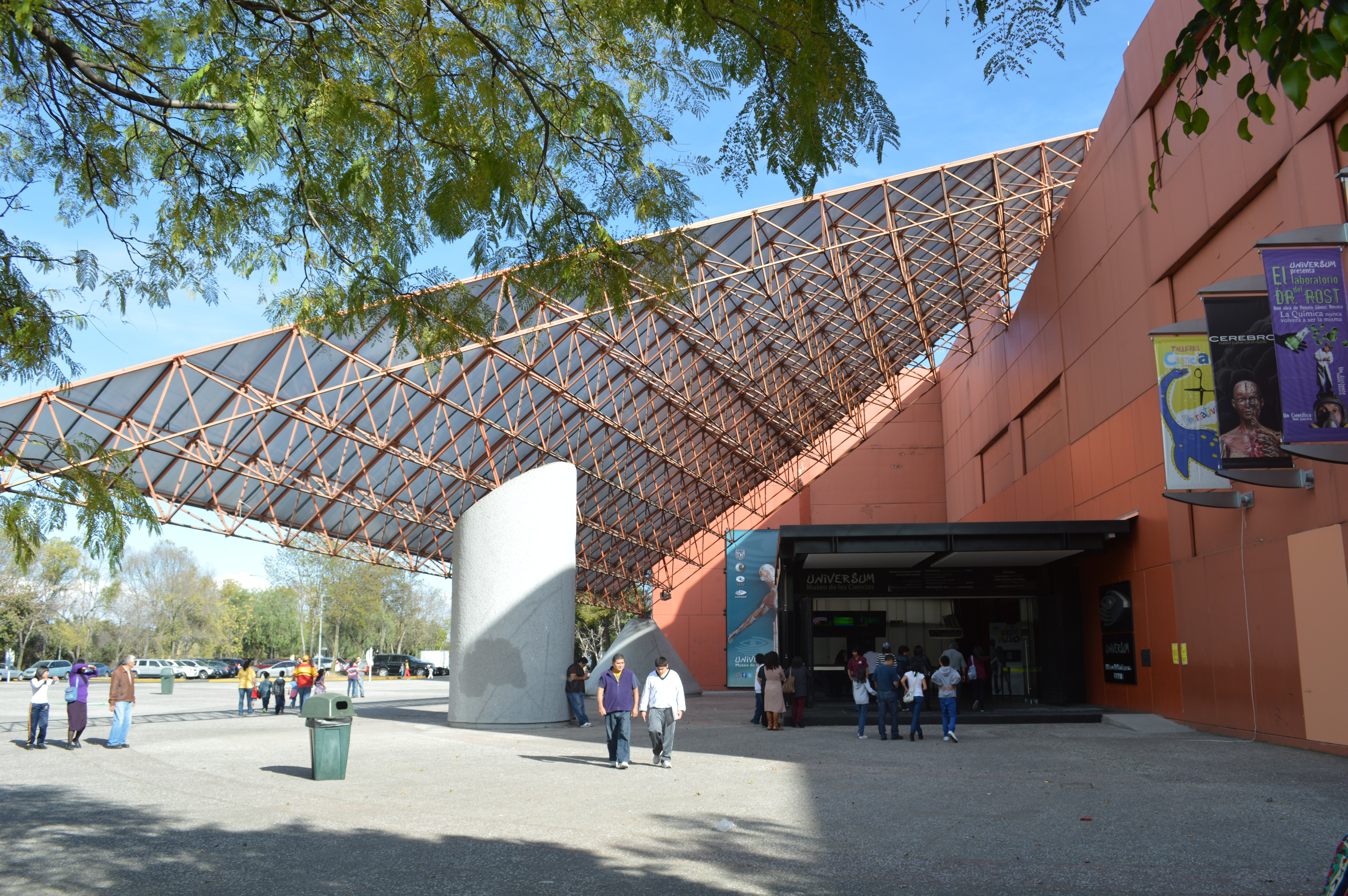
- Main entrance to the museum
- Location: Mexico City
- Director: José Franco
- Website: Official website

Universum (full name "Universum, el Museo de las Ciencias de la Universidad Nacional Autónoma de México", which translates to "Universum, the Science Museum of the National Autonomous University of Mexico") is Mexico's primary museum dedicated to promoting science and technology to the public and to support the university's science missions. It opened in 1992 at the Ciudad Universitaria in Mexico City. It has thirteen halls divided by theme dedicated to various permanent exhibitions. It has worked with outside public and private entities to develop both permanent and temporary exhibitions and has worked to develop other science museums in other areas of the country.

== Institution ==
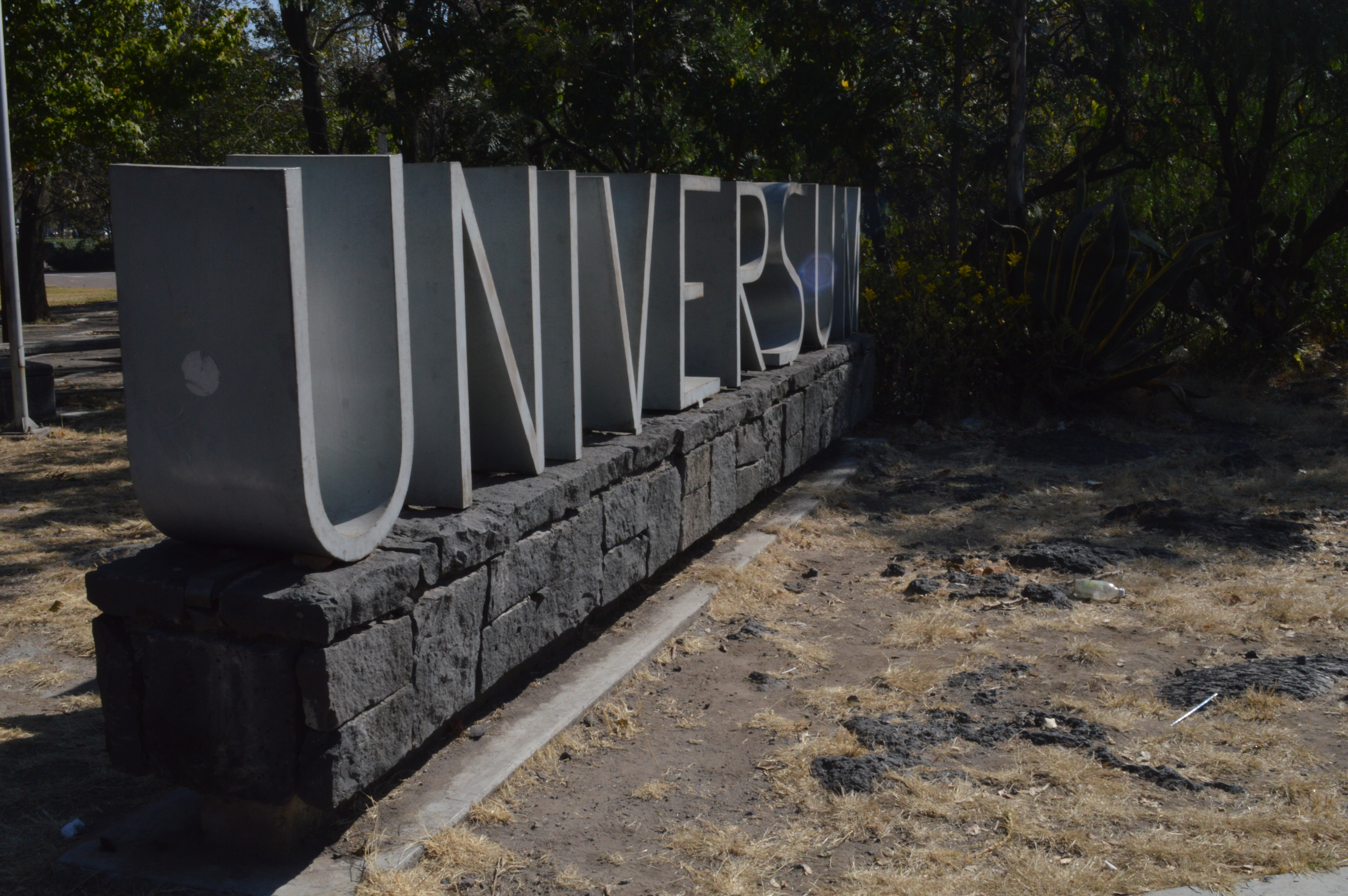

Opened in 1992, Universum is one of the first science museums of its type in Latin America . It is located on a 10-hectare (25-acre) site in the south of the Ciudad Universitaria, an area that houses a number of the university's cultural institutions, which is also part of the Pedregal de San Ángel ecological reserve. Its facilities cover 25,000 m^{2} (270,000 sq ft) with 12,000 m^{2} (130,000 sq ft) dedicated to permanent exhibitions. These permanent exhibitions are housed in thirteen main halls with various themes.

Its mission is to contribute to the formation of a scientific and technological culture, and to an interest in science and technology by society in general. For this reason, the exhibitions are designed to increase understanding by using simplified language and attractive presentations. Another of the museum's functions is to archive and make available work done by UNAM's researchers at the facility's library and archives.

During the institution's twenty years, it has received over 11 million visitors. Universum has also worked to create extension museums in other parts of the country such as the Museo de Ciencia y Tecnología in Chiapas.

== Permanent exhibits ==
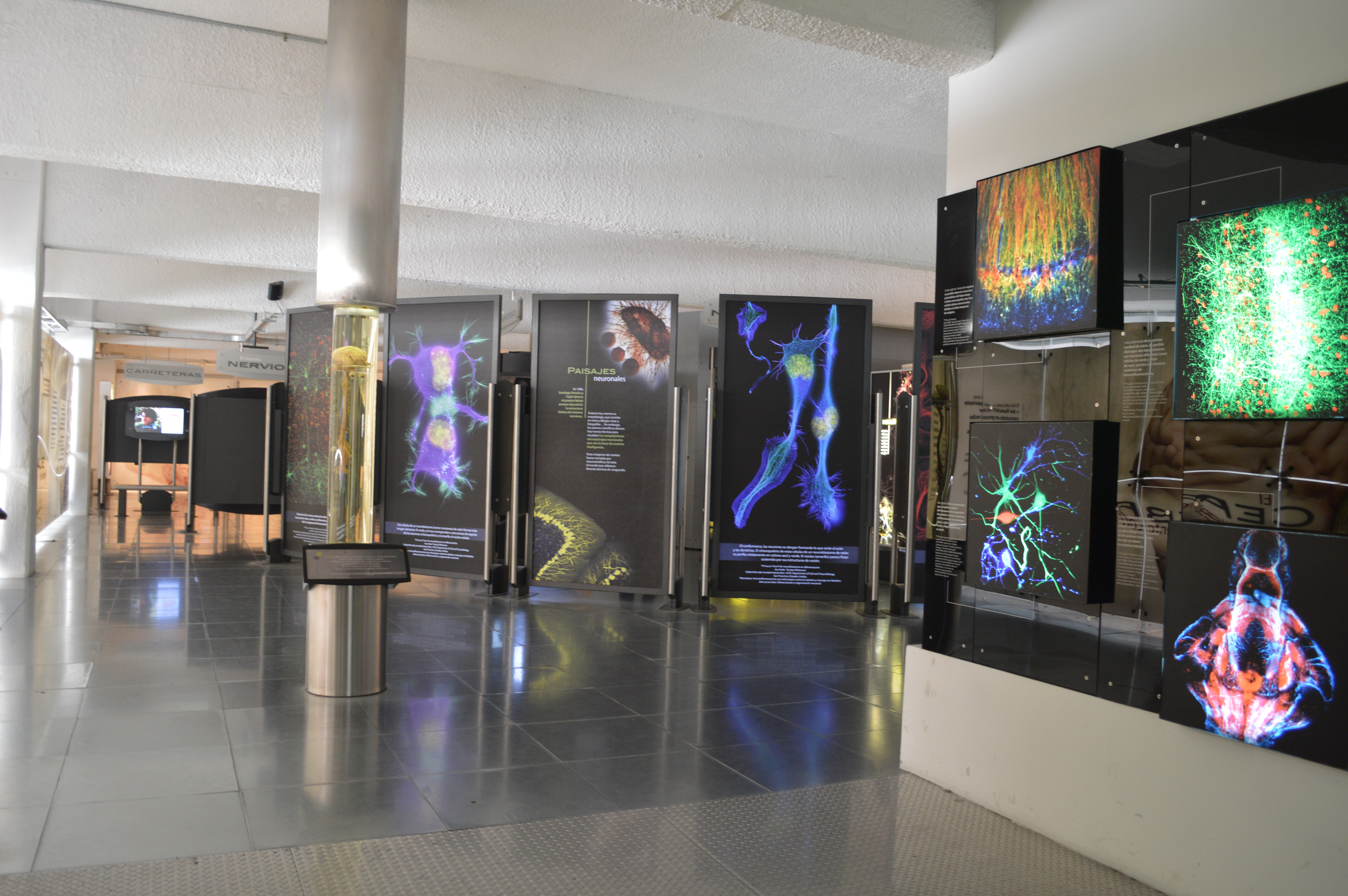
Part of the brain and nervous system exhibition

Permanent exhibits are housed in thirteen halls on three floors of the main complex. They include the José de la Herrán Planetarium, the Parákata Butterfly Exhibit, the Patli exhibit on medicinal plants, Biodiversity Hall, Mathematics Hall, Golem unit on artificial intelligence, Reduce, Reuse, Recycle, The Brain, Chemistry in Everything, The Universe, Euclid's Window, Our City, Evolution, Life and Time, Population, Health and Sexuality. A number of its exhibits have been developed in collaboration with private and public entities. The Paráka Butterfly Exhibit is an area with live butterflies in an enclosure designed to imitate their natural habitat. It also works to breed butterflies native to the Valley of Mexico. The Health section focuses on human health and its maintenance, with interactive displays, some of which provide personal information. The hall was sponsored by the Asociación Nacional de Productores de Refrescos y Aguas Carbonatadas. The space exhibit has real Moon rocks which were donated to the institution by NASA. The museum also has an artificial intelligence robot, called Golem, created for interaction with children. It was created by scientists in applied mathematics from UNAM to respond with information modified to the person who is interacting with it. It is the first robot designed to recognize children's voices speaking Spanish.

== Temporary exhibits ==
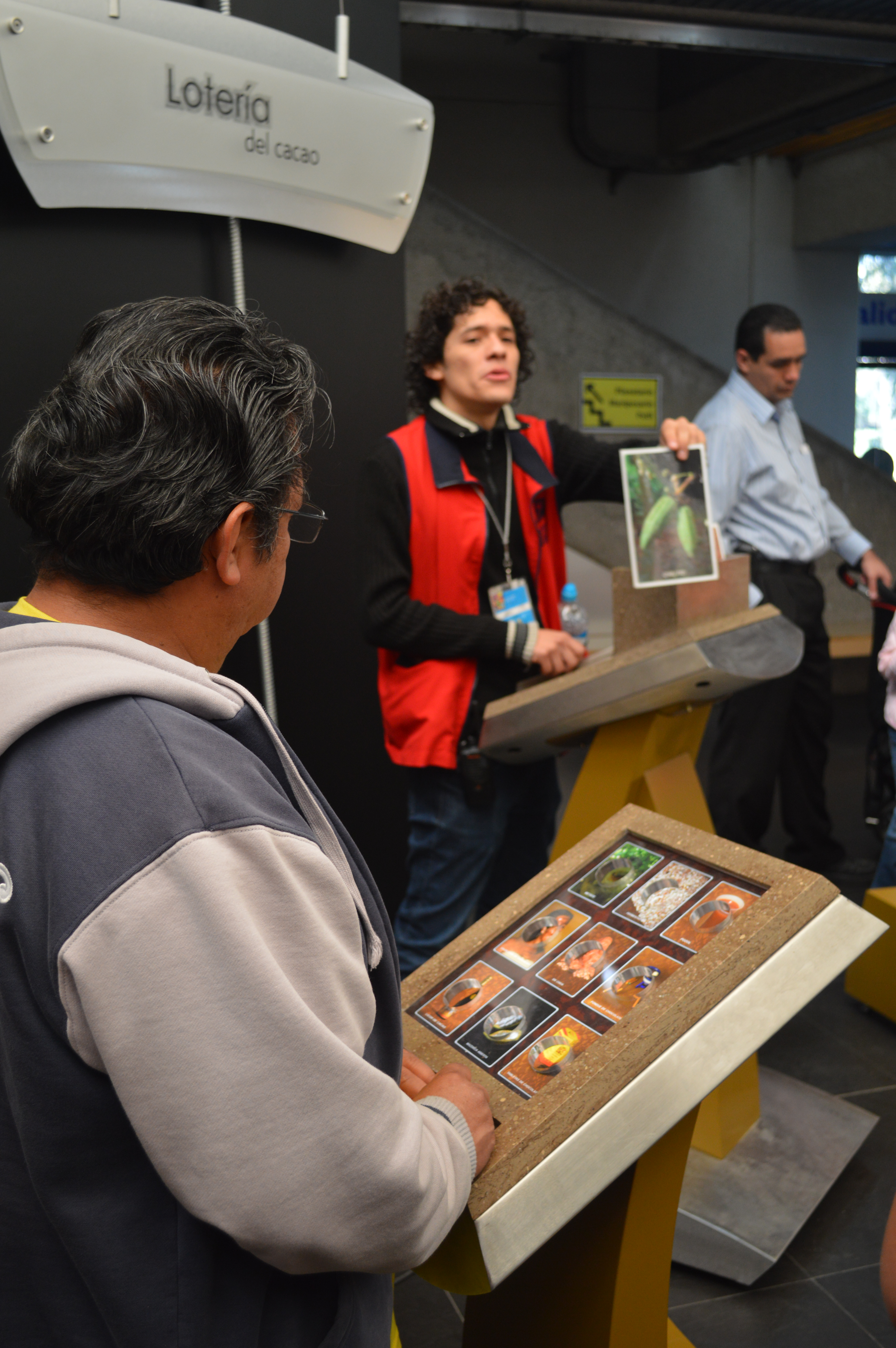
Museum visitors playing lotería as part of a cacao exhibit

In addition to its permanent exhibits, the museum also hosts small- and large-scale temporary exhibitions, sometimes in collaboration with other institutions. In 2002, the museum hosted an exhibit called En busca de Teotihuacan:Arqueologia y ciencia (In search of Teotihuacan: Archeology and science) dedicated to the science related to the excavation and interpretation of the remains of the ancient city. In 2004, it hosted robotic displays of savanna animals from Africa such as a hippopotamus waking up, an elephant calling to its child and a crocodile opening its mouth to let birds pick off remains of its meal. The display was created as a collaboration between the university and the Mexican animation company Animatronix. In 2006, an exhibit demonstrating how a virus infects a cell was created by artist and architect Antonio O'Connell, made with wood, much of which was recycled from construction sites. In 2010, Tunnel of Science, and exhibit about the mysteries of the universe, was dedicated to German physicist Max Planck. In 2012, the museum held various small exhibits such as "La ciencia con sabor a chocolate" (Chocolate flavored science), but its largest temporary exhibition was the inauguration of Body Worlds Vital. Body Worlds is a series of exhibitions of real human bodies which have been "plastified" for display. In this exhibition, it shows the body in movement.

== Services and events ==
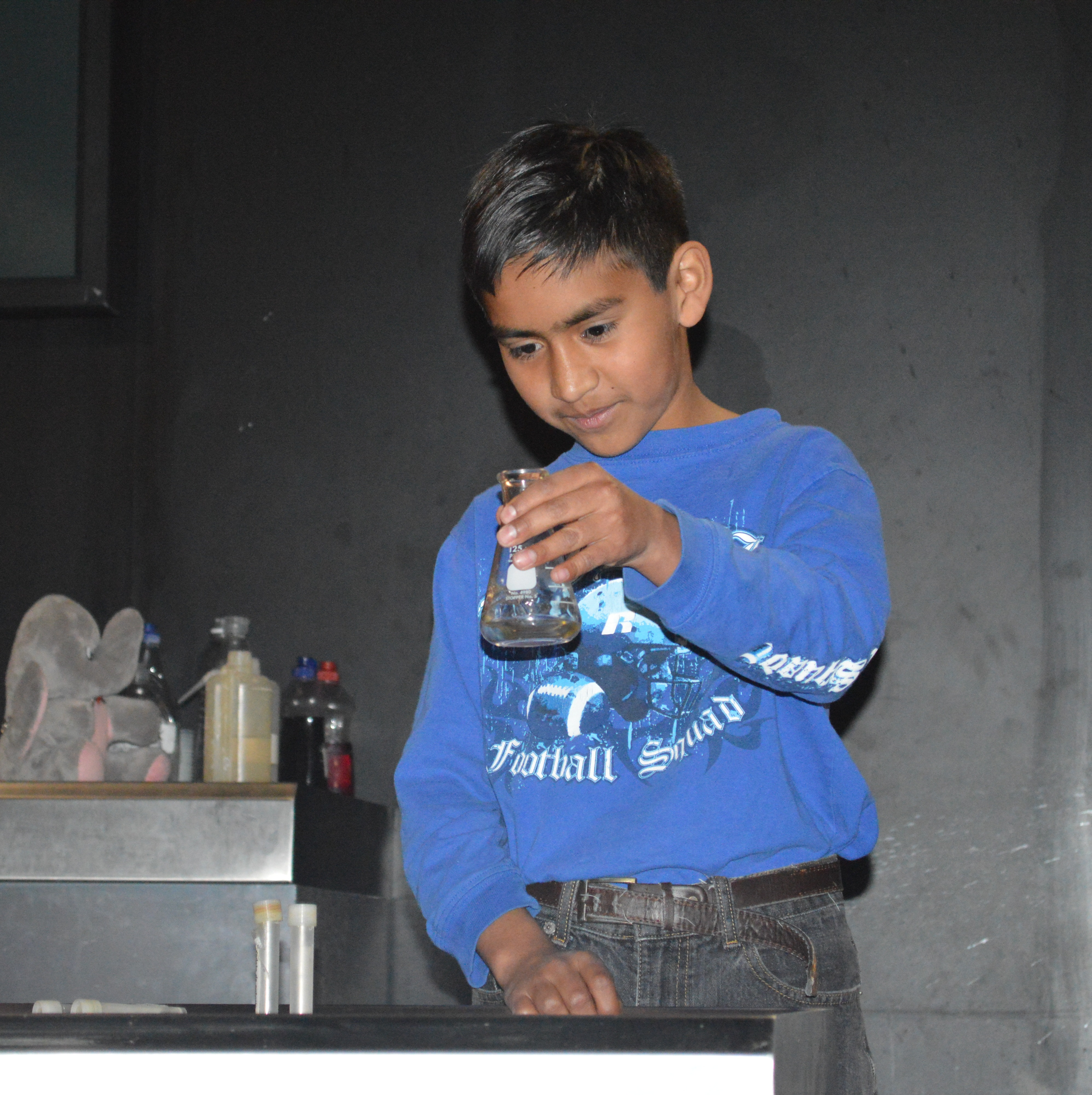
Child with beaker at a chemistry demonstration

The museum seeks to engage the public through exhibitions, activities, workshops, conferences, classes, cinema and theater. It also hosts meetings, congresses, book presentations, seminars, roundtables, award ceremonies, demonstrations and more. In summer, the museum hosts classes and courses for children, divided by age group, on science topics. Events in 2012, included the 61st Encuento de Ciencias, Artes y Humanidades (Science, Art and Humanities Encounter), and events to coincide with the transit of Venus across the sun. The 20th anniversary of the museum included conferences, exhibitions, a Science, Arte and Rock Festival, and a Christmas campaign called Regalar también tiene ciencia (Giving also has science). Courses for children and adults include basic astronomy, modern astronomy and constructing a telescope. The museum offers internships and other programs for students in undergraduate programs.

The museum has rental facilities including the Teatro Universum, Foro de Quimica, Sala Juárez, Auditorio de la Casita de las Ciencias, Cabina de Radio and Sala Luis Estrada, and a cafeteria and full restaurant.
