= Ana Carolina da Fonseca =

Brazilian-American actress, television personality, and model

- Occupations: Actress, model
- Years active: 1998–present
- Website: www.anacarolinaevents.com

Ana Carolina da Fonseca is a Brazilian-American actress, television personality, and model.

== Filmography ==
Year	Film	Role	Genre
2003	Te Amaré en Silencio	Celeste	Telenovela
2006	DoDo Rings	Katherine	Film
2008	Al Fin y al Cabo		Film
2008	The Music of You	Angel	Film
2010–2011	Eva Luna		Telenovela
