= Ana Claudia Talancón =

Mexican actress (born 1980)

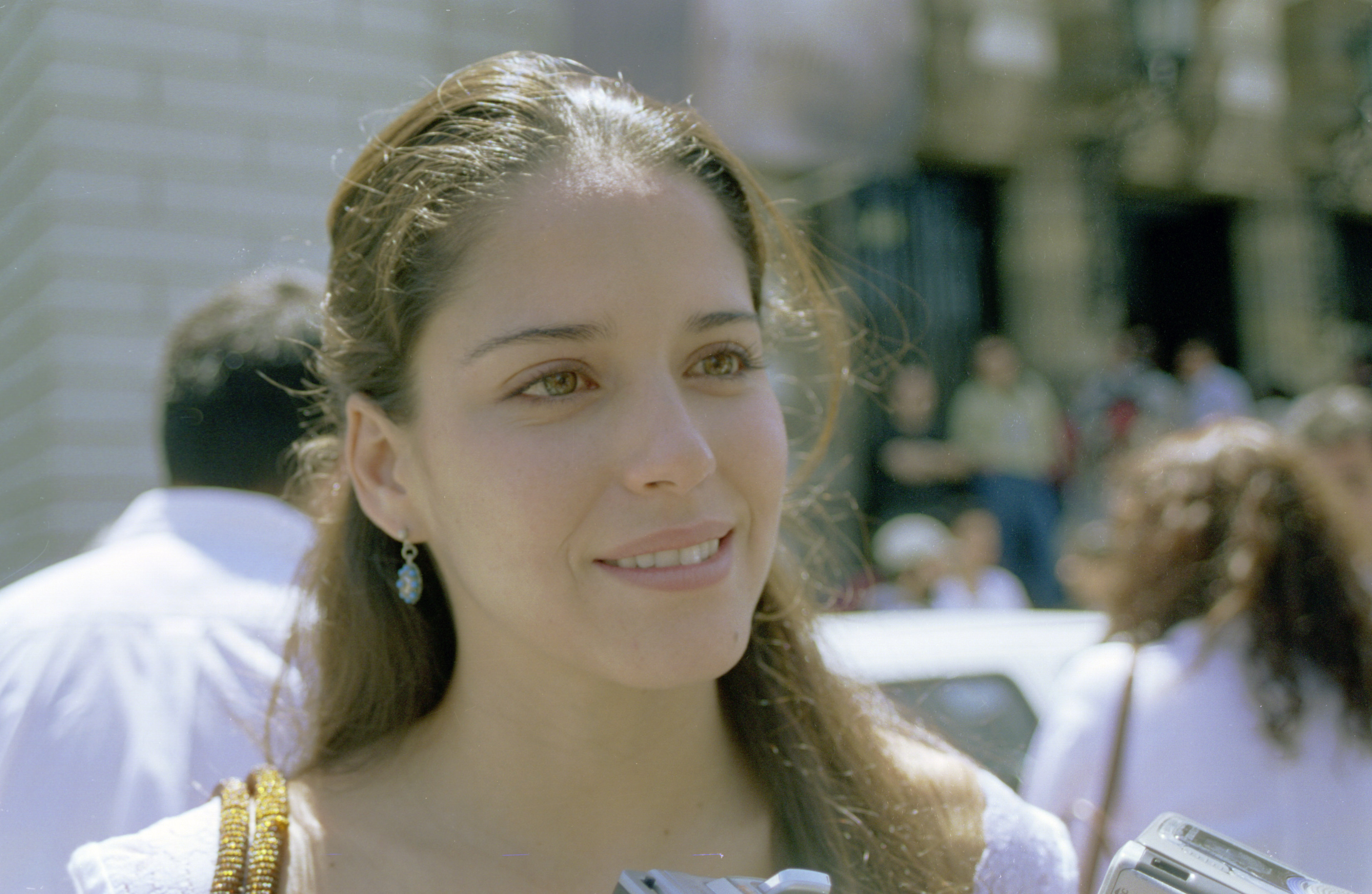
- Born: Ana Claudia Talancón Ortiz Tirado; 1 May 1980 (age 45); Cancún, Quintana Roo, Mexico
- Occupation(s): Actress, producer, TV host, philanthropist

Ana Claudia Talancón Ortiz Tirado (born 1 May 1980), is a Mexican actress, TV host, and philanthropist. She first started acting in her home town, Cancún, Quintana Roo.

== Early life and career ==
Talancón first studied acting in Cancún with the Cuban professor Albio Paz. She later went to Mexico City to continue her studies at the Acting Workshop of Héctor Mendoza and Raúl Quintanilla. Since then, she has starred in various soap operas such as Al Norte del Corazón, Señora, Amor Latino and Romántica Obsesión, for which she won the Sol de Oro award in 1999 for Best New Actress.

Talancón made her film debut in El Cometa by Marisa Sistach, playing the character Valentina, for which she was nominated for the Ariel Award for Best New Actress. Her breakthrough role came in El crimen del Padre Amaro (2002), in which she starred alongside Gael García Bernal as Amelia, a young woman impregnated by a Catholic priest who then dies after a backstreet abortion.

== Career ==
In 2006, Talancón appeared in Richard Linklater's Fast Food Nation as Coco, a Mexican immigrant forced to work in a meatpacking plant. That same year, she starred in the film Alone with Her as the main character. She also appeared in films such as The Virgin of Juarez, in which she received the award for the Best Supporting Actress at the BendFilm Festival and Mujer Alabastrina.

Talancón later appeared mainly in films such as Love in the Time of Cholera and El Ultimo Justo, rather than in Latin soap operas. In 2008, she starred in One Missed Call, which was nominated at the Teen Choice Awards, Tear This Heart Out (Arráncame la Vida), Days of Wrath, and the Mexican TV series, Terminales.

== Modeling ==
Talancón has also posed for various lingerie and swimsuit advertisements, including Intimissimi and Gentlemen's Quarterly magazine.

== Filmography ==
Year	Title	Role
1999	El juego sin reglas	
1999	El Cometa	Valentina
2002	El crimen del Padre Amaro	Amélia
2003	El umbral	Gina
2003	Ladies' Night	Alicia
2004	Matando Cabos	Paulina Cabos
2005	Después de la muerte	Cleotilde
2005	Sueño	Nina
2006	The Virgin of Juarez	Mariela
2006	Contracorriente	Chuya
2006	Alone with Her	Amy
2006	Fast Food Nation	Coco
2007	Love in the Time of Cholera	Olimpia Zuleta
2007	El último justo	Miryam
2008	One Missed Call	Taylor Anthony
2008	Arráncame la Vida	Catalina Guzman
2008	Days of Wrath	Samantha Rodriguez
2010	The Dry Land	Adriana
2011	El Sueño De Ivan	
2012	La Venta Del Paraiso	
2013	Tercera Llamada	
2013	Enter the Dangerous Mind	
2019	Como caído del cielo	Raquel
2022	¡Qué despadre!	Paula

=== Television ===
- Al Norte del Corazón (1997)
- Señora (1998)
- Romántica Obsesión (1999)
- Amor Latino (2000)
- Lo que callamos las mujeres (2001)
- Vale todo (2002)
- Tiempo Final (2004)
- Terminales (2008)
- Dollhouse (2009)
- Soy tu fan (2010)
- Covert Affairs (2012)
- Palabra de ladron (2014)
- Top Chef Mexico Host (2017)
- El Recluso (2018)
- The Accident (2024)
