= Tear This Heart Out =

- Theatrical release poster
- Directed by: Roberto Sneider
- Written by: Roberto Sneider; Ángeles Mastretta
- Starring: Ana Claudia Talancón; Daniel Giménez Cacho; José María de Tavira
- Cinematography: Javier Aguirresarobe
- Distributed by: 20th Century Fox
- Release date: September 12, 2008
- Running time: 107 minutes
- Country: Mexico
- Language: Spanish

Tear This Heart Out (Spanish: Arráncame la vida) is a 2008 Mexican romantic historical drama film directed by Roberto Sneider based on the novel of the same name by Ángeles Mastretta. It was Mexico's official submission for the 2009 Academy Award for Best Foreign Language Film, make the shortlist, but was not nominated.

== Plot ==
The film takes place over the span of several years within the 1930s in Mexico, focusing on the life of Catalina "Catín" Guzmán (Ana Claudia Talancón), a young girl born to a middle-class family in Puebla. She meets the cunning General Andrés Ascencio (Daniel Giménez Cacho) while on an outing with her family and he becomes interested in her, paying her regular visits and lavishing her with gifts and praise. Smitten, she agrees to accompany him to Tecolutla and loses her virginity to him. At that point she becomes curious about sexual activity, including masturbation. Despite Andrés's light misogyny and casual derisions of her age and intelligence whenever offering her opinions on politics and other issues they discuss, she cares for him. Returning home and having no contact with each other for some days, he arrives at her home one day and proposes marriage to her; she excitedly accepts, despite her family's gentle misgivings about the union due to her age (she is 15). A hint of the true depth of Andrés's sexism is revealed while signing the marriage papers and at a celebratory breakfast for the couple—Andrés stresses his ownership of Catalina to her father and states that he is now in control of her behaviour as the man of the family. She mentions her family and friends' warnings that she will regret marrying a man they perceive to be an untrustworthy and sinister womaniser, a warning she fails to heed—and yet later acknowledges as a regret that came years later.

The couple's movements between Andrés's city home in Puebla and hacienda mark idyllic times for Catalina; riding in the lands surrounding the hacienda, taking cooking classes, enjoying a rich lifestyle and having frequent sex is what Catalina knows. Despite showing concern over certain issues, such as her husband's plans to flood a valley for an electric dam (thus forcing the relocation of hundreds of impoverished farmers and villagers in the area) and his shady dealings with a neighbour, an American expatriate named Mike Heiss, his constant rebukes of her intrusions in his business as a "busybody woman" keep her from forcing the issue, though these stay clearly in her consciousness. His arrest due to accusations of murder give her a taste of the true volatility and uncertainty of being a political wife, despite his release a few days later. Shortly after she discovers that she is pregnant, yet her joy is dampened significantly when she sees him embracing another woman, her first glimpse of his many infidelities. He dismisses her angry chastisement of his actions and she briefly takes on a childhood friend as a lover to alleviate her loneliness, as Andrés spends less time with her during her pregnancy. Years pass and another baby is born to them.

Andrés brings two children of his own—including a daughter who is 12, only seven years younger than Catalina—to live with them, explaining that they are the product of the union between him and his first wife, a saintly woman who died of typhus during the Revolution (Catín comments that their actual mother was alive and well, living in Veracruz). She believes him and gets along well with the children. At the same time Andrés announces his postulation as Governor of Puebla, a move enthusiastically supported by his family, who accompany him on extensive campaigning trips and witness several speeches to the poorer constituents of the state, promising progress and an improved state.

== Cast ==
- Ana Claudia Talancón - Catalina Guzmán, the young wife of Andrés Ascencio.
- Daniel Giménez Cacho - Andres Ascencio, a philandering, corrupt and populistic politician.
- José María de Tavira - Carlos Vives, the idealistic director of an orchestra.
- Mariana Peñalva - Mercedes
- Irene Azuela - Bárbara
- Delia Casanova - Julia
- Julio Bracho - Cienfuegos
- Danna Paola - Lilia Ascencio - Age 12
- María Aura - Pepa

== Background ==
According to the translator of the English edition, Margaret Sayers Peden, the story was partly grounded on the life of General Maximino Avila Camacho, whose arrogance and ruthlessness was attested by his bloody violence toward his political enemies. He achieved much of his power from his highly political family: his brother, Manuel Ávila Camacho, was the President of Mexico. Maximino was one of the last of the unfettered caudillos and his excesses as Governor of the State of Puebla help trigger political reforms to tame Caudillismo in early post-revolutionary Mexico.

The character Mike Heiss, who appears early in the film, was based on William O. Jenkins.

== Production ==
This movie, with a budget of over $6,000,000, was at the time of its production the most expensive ever made in Mexico. It was the official submission of Mexico to the Foreign Language category of the 2009 Academy Awards competition.

== See also ==
- List of submissions to the 81st Academy Awards for Best Foreign Language Film
- List of Mexican submissions for the Academy Award for Best Foreign Language Film
