= Eva Luna (TV series) =

- Based on: Aguamarina by Leonardo Padrón
- Developed by: Alex Hadad
- Written by: Alex Hadad; Nora Castillo
- Directed by: Adriana Barraza; Luis Alejandro Vélez; Tito Rojas
- Starring: Blanca Soto; Guy Ecker; Julian Gil; Vanessa Villela; Susana Dosamantes; Jorge Lavat; Anna Silvetti; Lupita Ferrer
- Opening theme: "Él", performed by Jenni Rivera
- Country of origin: United States
- Original language: Spanish
- No. of episodes: 112

Production
- Executive producers: Peter Tinoco; Carlos Sotomayor
- Producer: Dulce Terán
- Production locations: Miami, Florida
- Running time: 39–57 minutes (length varied per episode)
- Production companies: Univision; Venevisión International

Original release
- Network: Univision
- Release: November 1, 2010 – April 11, 2011

Eva Luna is an American telenovela produced by Venevisión International in collaboration with Univision Studios, starring Blanca Soto, Guy Ecker, Julian Gil and Susana Dosamantes. It is a remake of the 1997 telenovela Aguamarina, created by Leonardo Padrón. The telenovela aired on Univision from November 1, 2010 to April 11, 2011. In Mexico, Canal de las Estrellas aired Eva Luna from September 19, 2011 to January 6, 2012.

== Synopsis ==
A love story set in Los Angeles, Eva Luna revolves around the life of Eva González (Blanca Soto), a young woman of extraordinary beauty, humble and hardworking. Like so many immigrants coming to America, Eva arrives with her father and younger sister to California in search of a better life. However, Eva does not imagine that to find happiness she will first have to suffer a terrible loss, because her life is intertwined with the dark family secrets, lies, deceptions, and ambitions of a powerful family.

Eva finds work as a personal attendant to the founder of Publicidad Arismendi, Julio Arismendi. She immediately wins over his son, Leonardo Arismendi (Julian Gil), and his best friend, Daniel Villanueva (Guy Ecker), who is dating Leonardo's sister, Victoria (Vanessa Villela). Victoria and her mother, Marcela (Susana Dosamantes), dislike Eva, as they feel that Eva threatens Victoria's beauty. Daniel is a successful advertising executive of Publicidad Arismendi and widowed father of a young daughter named Laurita (Gaby Borges). Daniel & Eva are immediately attracted to each other. At first, the relationship between Daniel and Eva is a disastrous swing of love and hate, but in the end they fall madly, passionately in love. When Daniel leaves Victoria for Eva, Marcela takes action. She gives Victoria a cup of tea and has her go to sleep. Renata, their housekeeper, is sent to check on Victoria, and calls 911 when she sees Victoria won't answer and has pills next to her bedside, that Marcela put there on purpose. Awaking in the hospital, Victoria is told by her mother that she attempted to commit suicide, although Victoria herself has no memory or thought of committing suicide. Marcela explains that she must play the part of the heartbroken suicidal victim in order to trick Daniel to come back to her, but Daniel will not be manipulated by the two women anymore.

Marcela Arismendi is a cold woman. Her first husband was El Gallo – Leonardo's father, a fact that only she knew. She later married Julio and adopted Victoria. Marcela was more interested in Julio's wealth and power in society than anything else. She has been slowly poisoning him to an early death, so that she can be the only owner of the multimillion dollar company she and Julio created. She sent orders to kill Daniel's parents and his wife, so that Victoria, could marry Daniel and Marcela would have complete control over her associate. Slowly, Julio begins to see patterns in his life. The few days that Eva stopped coming to take care of him, he refused to take his medicine, and he actually felt healthier. When Eva returned, his medicine was again given to him, forcing him to stop testing his hypothesis. However, as months pass and Eva gets fired again, he throws his coffee with the medicine on the ground, and his faithful loving dog, Max, licks it off the ground.

The day of Eva and Daniel's secret, private wedding, Eva recalls what she has gone through to get to the love of her life. She lost her father to a hit and run accident, and Leonardo makes her believe that Daniel was the mysterious man behind the wheel that did not stop to help, when it was actually Leonardo borrowing Daniel's car. Devastated by learning that her future husband murdered her father, she swears revenge and Leonardo takes the opportunity to separate her from Daniel. Meanwhile, Marcela and Victoria plot to make Daniel hate Eva. Victoria sends Eva to pick up a check at the bank, saying it's for herself, when really it's in Eva's name, with $25,000 from Daniel's professional bank account. Eva unknowingly takes the check, and returns it to Victoria. Marcela breaks the "news" to Daniel on his would-be wedding day, after Eva stood him up, but he refuses to believe that Eva would steal from him, until he sees the pictures. Eva, meanwhile has turned catatonic, and will not leave her bed. Two days later, she runs away with Leonardo to his country home, where she hides from the police, after Daniel and Marcela have signed a warrant for her arrest.

After a series of unexpected events, Eva comes back with Daniel's son, and inherits the advertising agency where Daniel works, and returns to his life as his boss. Armed with a position of power and identity of the new moon, she puts her plan of revenge into action, but struggles between keeping the promise made at the tomb of her father or forgiving Daniel. However, Daniel is not fooled by Eva's new attitude, so to find Leonardo's betrayal, he decides to fight to prove his innocence and win her heart again.

Leonardo asks El Gallo to call Tony at a specific place, planning to kill him. He hires a man to shoot Tony, but Tony manages to escape unharmed. El Gallo had warned Leonardo not to kill Tony. El Gallo calls Leonardo at a warehouse and gives Tony the gun to kill him. Leonardo manages to escape, injuring Tony. Marcela kills El Gallo when he attempts to kill Leonardo. After Marcela instructs Leonardo to marry Eva, he leaves and tells El Gallo that he was the only man she loved but she couldn't allow him to kill his son.

On the day of Eva and Leonardo's wedding, Daniel is ready to stop the wedding by showing everyone a taped confession of Leonardo admitting to running over Eva's father. Eva personally stops the wedding and turns on Leonardo, accusing him of the crime. Victoria steps in and reveals that Leo hired Liliana to seduce Daniel in an attempt to keep him away from Eva and herself, caused Alicia to lose her baby with poison (the same way Marcela caused Claudia to lose her baby), and confirmed that Leo killed Eva's father (after remembering that Leo claimed to have run over a tree). Leonardo attempts to kill Victoria, until Renata protects Victoria from injury and dies from being shot. Angered after the truth was revealed, policemen and detectives go after Leonardo after he holds Eva hostage as a way to kill her, and hurts Daniel by shooting him in the arm. Leo is then shot by detective Ravela and is run over by a car, instantly killing him.

Time passes by, and Eva and Daniel, reunited after a long time, prepare themselves to get married at last. Marcela returns after learning that her son has died "because of Eva". Marcela, previously arrested for murdering Daniel's parents and attempting to murder Julio, escaped from prison by killing the guards with El Gallo aiding her. She returns to the mansion and sets it on fire to kill Eva and Pablito. Marcela is unsuccessful, as Daniel comes in time to save Eva and their son. The mansion burns down, and Marcela is killed. Eva and Daniel finally get married, while Alicia and Tony kiss at the end.

== Cast of characters ==
- Blanca Soto as Eva Luna González Aldana de Villanueva: former apple picker, Julio's former personal maid, Publicidad Arismendi's boss, Alicia's older sister, daughter of Ismael and Deborah, Matilde's niece, Julio's close friend, Pablito's mother, Laurita's stepmother, Leo's ex-fiancée, married to Daniel.
- Guy Ecker as Daniel Villanueva: Publicidad Arismendi's boss, Victoria's ex-husband, Francisco's friend, Julio's close friend, father of Laurita and Pablito, Liliana's former "lover", married to Eva.
- Julián Gil as Leonardo "Leo" Arismendi Castro: Victoria's "brother"/stepbrother, Marcela's son, Julio's stepson, El Gallo's biological son, "loved" Eva, murdered Eva's father, Alicia's unborn baby, and Renata, Alicia's former lover.
- Susana Dosamantes as Marcela Castro Ex. de Arismendi: Publicidad Arismendi's ex-director, Deborah's ex-friend, Leonardo's mother, Victoria's "adopted mother", Julio's ex-wife, El Gallo's true lover, poisoned Daniel's parents and Daniel's first wife in order to gain control of his fortune, killed Claudia's unborn baby, Bruno and his mistress Rosaura, and El Gallo, attempted to kill Eva and Daniel.
- Vanessa Villela as Victoria Arismendi Valdéz: Daniel's ex-wife, Marcela's "adopted daughter", Leo's "sister"/stepsister, Justa and Julio's biological daughter, Renata's niece, ex-friend of Claudia and Liliana, former enemy of Eva and Laurita.
- Jorge Lavat as Julio Arismendi: close friend of Eva and Daniel, Leonardo's stepfather, Victoria's biological father, Marcela's ex-husband, in love with Justa.
- Anna Silvetti as Renata Valdéz: former employee of Arismendi family, Victoria's aunt, Justa's sister, in love with Julio
- Lupita Ferrer as Justa Valdéz de Guzmán: married to Ricardo, in love with Julio, Victoria's biological mother, Renata's sister, Adrian's adopted mother.
- Sofía Lama as Alicia González Aldana: Eva's younger sister, daughter of Ismael and Deborah, Matilde's niece, Marisol's close friend, formerly pregnant with Leonardo's child, ex-lover of Carlos and Leonardo, in love with Tony.
- Alejandro Chabán as Tony Santana: in love with Alicia, used to work with Leo and El Gallo.
- Gabriela Borges as Laurita Villanueva: Daniel's daughter, Eva's stepdaughter, Pablito's sister, friends with Adrian, Francisco, and Jackie, Victoria's ex-enemy.
- Christian Vega as Adrian Reyes: biological son of Thomas Reyes (although he beat him very badly), Laurita's friend, adopted son of Ricardo and Justa.
- Harry Geithner as Francisco Ramírez Conti: employee in Daniel's home (chauffeur), Marisol's ex-husband, married to Jackie.
- Leticia Morales as Jackie de Ramírez Conti: Laurita's nanny, Eva's close friend, married to Francisco.
- Daniela Schmidt as Marisol Martínez Ex. de Ramírez Conti: friend of Eva and Alicia, Giorgio's close friend, Francisco's ex-wife
- Raúl Xiques as Ricardo Guzmán: former boxer, married to Justa, Adrian's adopted father.
- Sonia Noemí as Matilde González: Eva and Alicia's aunt, Ismael's sister, Pablito's great-aunt.
- Frances Ondiviela as Deborah Aldana Vda. de González: Marcela's ex-friend, mother of Eva's and Alicia, Ismael's ex-wife, Matilde's sister in-law, Pablito's grandmother.
- Greydis Gil as Claudia Jiménez: Victoria's ex-friend, Leonardo's ex-girlfriend, formerly pregnant with Leonardo's child
- José Guillermo Cortines as Bruno Lombardi: former lovers of Marcela and Victoria, Rosaura/"Azucena"'s lover
- Franklin Virgüez as El Gallo: Leonardo's biological father, Marcela's true lover, worked with Leo and Tony.
- Carlos Ferro as Carlos Maldonado: in love with Alicia, model at Publicidad Arismendi.
- Priscila Perales as Liliana Solis, hired by Leonardo to seduce Daniel after Eva became the new owner of Publicidad Arismendi, Victoria's ex-friend, Leonardo's lover, enemy of Eva and Daniel
- Eduardo Ibarrola as Ismael González: Eva and Alicia's father, Deborah's deceased husband, Matilde's deceased brother.
- Liz Coleandro as Aurelia: ex-employee for the Arismendi family, Eva's friend.
- Ana Carolina da Fonseca as Violeta: works at a nightclub, Marisol's friend.
- Stephie Torres as Olga: Marcela's former personal assistant, who later works as Eva's assistant.
- Patricia Ramos as Sabrina, former employee for the Arismendi family
- Cristina Figarola as Ms. Farinas
- Enrique Herrera as Father Suarez
- Ernesto Molina as Tiran: private detective who worked for Victoria
- Juan Troya as David Basañez
- Marcos Miranda as Dr. Marcos Garcia
- Jorge Consejo as Jose Lozano
- Alberto Salaberri as Giorgio
- Verónica Montes as Maritza Ruiz
- Arnaldo Pipke as Damian
- Pau Gasol as himself
- Jenni Rivera as herself
- Eddie "Piolín" Sotelo
- Carlos Cruz as Detective
- Carlos Pitela
- Enrique Arredondo as Detective
- Gerardo Riveron as Lawyer
- Guadalupe Hernández
- Hector Fuentes as Detective Reyes
- Jose Luis Tovar as Policeman
- Juan Carlos Baena as Lawyer
- Juan Cepero as Car dealer
- Juan Troya as David Basañez
- Omar Robau as Officer Rodriguez
- Marcos Miranda as Dr. Marcos Garcia
- Kary Musa as Rosaura
- Marta Gonzalez as Lucy
- Mirta Renee as Vanessa
- Rafael Robledo as Detective
- Ramon Morell as Dr. Santiago Rivera
- Rayner Garranchan as Detective Morales
- Severino Puente as Judge
- Tely Ganas as Professor Rosales
- Carlos Yustis as Thomas Reyes
- Pau Gasol as himself

== Music ==
Eva Luna

Soundtrack album by Various artists
- Released: 1 January 2011
- Recorded: 2010–2011
- Length: 39:00
- Label: Universal Music Latino

The soundtrack of the telenovela, titled "Eva Luna", was released on 1 January 2011.

Track listing

No.	Title	Length
1.	"Él" (Jenni Rivera)	3:44
2.	"Eva Luna" (Michelangelo Mejia)	3:37
3.	"Yerbatero" (Juanes)	3:33
4.	"Perdídos" (Emmanuel)	3:30
5.	"Si Me Puedo Quedar" (Marco Antonio Solis)	3:41
6.	"Cuando Digo Tu Nombre (Mejor)" (Alejandro Fernández)	3:20
7.	"Tu Angelito" (Chino & Nacho)	3:55
8.	"Ni Con Otro Corazón (Version Banda)" (Pedro Fernández)	3:14
9.	"Gracias a Ti" (Wisin & Yandel)	3:54
10.	"Mi Corazón Se Fue" (Diego Torres)	3:47
11.	"Quiero Decirte Que Te Amo" (El Trono de México)	3:05
Total length:		39:00

== Awards ==
Year	Award	Category	Nominated	Result
2011	Premios Juventud	Girl that takes the sleep away / Chica Que Me Quita El Sueño	Blanca Soto	Nominated
2011	Premios Juventud	What a Hottie! / Está Buenísimo	Guy Ecker	Nominated
2011	Premios Juventud	What a Hottie! / Está Buenísimo	Julián Gil	Nominated
2011	Premios Juventud	Best Ballad / Canción Corta-venas	"El" by Jenni Rivera	Nominated
2011	Premios Juventud	Best Musical Theme / Mejor Tema Novelero	"El" by Jenni Rivera	Won
2011	Premios People En Español	Best Lead Actress / Mejor actriz	Blanca Soto	Nominated
2011	Premios People En Español	Best Lead Actor / Mejor actor	Guy Ecker	Nominated
2011	Premios People En Español	Best Male Antagonist / Mejor villano	Julián Gil	Won
2011	Premios People En Español	Best Co-star Actor / Mejor Actor Secundario	Alejandro Chabán	Nominated
2011	Premios People En Español	Best Co-star Actress / Mejor Actriz Secundaria	Vanessa Villela	Nominated
2011	Premios People En Español	Best Co-star Actress / Mejor Actriz Secundaria	Gabriela Borges	Nominated
2011	Premios People En Español	Best Male or Female Revelation / Revelación del año	Blanca Soto	Nominated
2011	Premios People En Español	Best Couple / Pareja del año	Blanca Soto and Guy Ecker	Nominated
2011	Premios People En Español	Best Telenovela of the Year / Mejor telenovela	Eva Luna	Nominated
2011	Premio Rockie (Festival Mundial de Medios)	Best Telenovela of the Year / Mejor telenovela	Eva Luna	Won
