= Blanca Soto =

Mexican actress and model

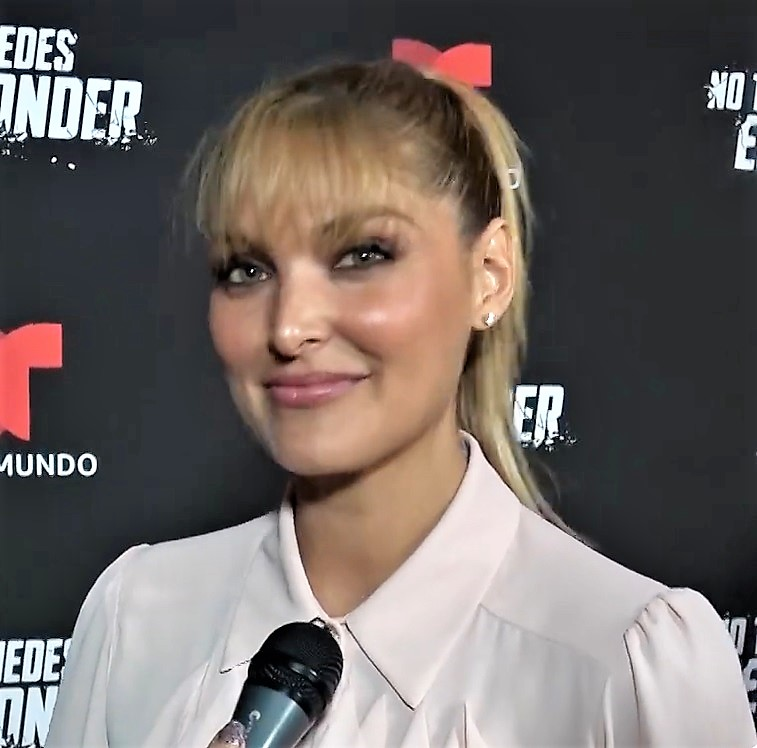
- Soto interviewed by Dulce Osuna in 2019
- Born: Monterrey, Nuevo León, Mexico
- Occupations: Actress; model; former beauty queen; producer
- Years active: 1997–present
- Title: Nuestra Belleza Mundo México 1997; Miss Verano Viña del Mar 1998
- Spouse: Jack Hartnett (m. 2006; sep. 2011).

Blanca Soto is a Mexican actress, model, and beauty pageant titleholder who was crowned Nuestra Belleza Mundo México in 1997.

== Career ==
Soto competed in the national beauty pageant Nuestra Belleza México in 1997, representing her home state of Nuevo León. That same year, Soto became Miss Mexico World and represented her country in the international beauty contest Vina Del Mar in Chile.

Soto's first role as an actress was in the short film La Vida Blanca, which she co-produced with then-husband Jack Hartnett, who wrote and directed as well. For the role, she received her first award for Best Actress. Soto then had supporting roles in films such as: "Divina Confusion", Deep in the Valley and Dinner for Schmucks. She starred in Venevisión's telenovelas in collaboration with Univision; Eva Luna (2010–2011) as Eva Gonzalez and El Talismán (2012) as Camila Nájera. Soto starred with Fernando Colunga in Juan Osorio's telenovela; Porque el amor manda which was broadcast in Mexico from 2012 to 2013.

She appeared in Billy Currington's music video "Must Be Doin' Somethin' Right" (winner of sexiest video of the year at the CMA). As a model, Soto has been featured in advertisements for GAP, LensCrafters, Venus Swimwear, Avon, Andrea, Charriol, Foley's, Yellowbook, Zara, Garnier and Budweiser.

== Personal life ==
Soto married American actor Jack Hartnett in 2006. She announced their separation on 17 November 2012 on her Twitter account.

== Filmography ==
=== As producer ===
Year	Title	Role
2020	You can't hide	Executive producer
2012	I Won't Be Your Mirror	co-producer
2015	Sovereign	Executive producer

=== Films ===
Year	Title	Role	Notes
2007	Tampa Jai Alai	Lissette Arriaga	Short film
2007	La vida blanca	Blanca Erraruiz	Short film Executive producer
2008	Divina confusión	Afrodita	
2009	Deep in the Valley	Suzi Diablo	
2010	Regresa	María González	
2010	La cena	Catherine	Uncredited
2014	Un reino sin fronteras	Herself	Television film

=== Television ===
Year	Title	Role	Notes
2010–2011	Eva Luna	Eva González	Lead role
2012	El Talismán	Camila Nájera	Lead role
2012–2013	Porque el amor manda	Alma Montemayor	Lead role
2014–2016	Señora Acero	Sara Aguilar	Lead role; 148 episodes
2019	You Cannot Hide	Mónica Saldaña	Lead role; 10 episodes

== Theater ==
Year	Title	Role
2011	The Vagina Monologues / Los Monólogos de la Vagina	Various monologues ("Hair", "My vagina was my village", "Because he liked to look at it")
2013–2014	Obscuro Total	Sofia

== Credits as a dubbing actress ==
Year	Title	Original title	Character	Language
2012	Sí, Virginia: Un cuento para creer en la Navidad	Yes, Virginia	Mrs. Laura O'Hanlon	English -> Spanish
2014	Hijo de Dios	Son of God	Mary Magdalene	English -> Spanish

== Appearances in music videos ==
Year	Artist	Title	Notes
1997	Donato y Estefano	"Entre la linea del bien y la linea del mal"	
1998	Enrique Iglesias	"Nunca Te Olvidaré"	
2002	Shalim Ortiz	"Nadie Como Tú"	
2005	Billy Currington	"Must Be Doin' Somethin' Right"	CMT Music Awards 2006 - Hottest Video of the Year
2009	Noel Schajris	"Regresar"	

== Awards and nominations ==
Year	Award	Category	Title	Result
2007	Feature Film Award	Best Actress	La Vida Blanca	Won
2011	Premios Juventud	She Steals the Show	Regresa	Won
2011	Premios Juventud	Girl of my Dreams	Eva Luna	Nominated
2011	Premios People en Español	Best Actress	Eva Luna	Nominated
2011	Premios People en Español	Best Female Revelation	Eva Luna	Nominated
2011	Premios People en Español	Best Host (& William Levy)	Premios Juventud 2012	Nominated
2012	Premios Juventud	Girl of my Dreams	El Talismán	Nominated
2012	Premios Actrices Latinas	Best Couple (& Fernando Colunga)	Porque el amor manda	Nominated
2013	Premios Juventud	Girl of my Dreams	Porque el amor manda	Won
2013	Premios People en Español	Best Couple (& Fernando Colunga)	Porque el amor manda	Won
2013	Premios People en Español	Best Actress	Porque el amor manda	Won
2014	Premios TVyNovelas	Best Actress	Porque el amor manda	Nominated
2014	Premios TVyNovelas	Best Kiss (& Fernando Colunga)	Porque el amor manda	Nominated
2014	Premios TVyNovelas	Best Couple (& Fernando Colunga)	Porque el amor manda	Nominated
2014	Premios TVyNovelas	The Most Beautiful Women	Porque el amor manda	Nominated
2015	Premios Tu Mundo	Favorite Lead Actress: Súper Serie	Señora Acero	Nominated
2015	Premios Tu Mundo	The Best Actor with Bad Luck	Señora Acero	Nominated
2016	Premios Tu Mundo	Favorite Lead Actress: Súper Serie	Señora Acero 2	Nominated
2016	Premios Tu Mundo	The Perfect Couple: Súper Serie (& Lincoln Palomeque)	Señora Acero 2	Nominated
2016	Premios Tu Mundo	The Best Actor with Bad Luck	Señora Acero 2	Nominated

== Other awards and recognitions ==
Year	Title	Notes
1997	Nuestra Belleza Mundo Mexico	Beauty contest (+ Special Award "Skin Solar Hinds")
1997	Miss Verano Viña del Mar	Beauty contest
2005	Corona al Merito	Recognition is given each year to a queen or ex-queen of Nuestra Belleza México, for their work dignifying human values and the image of Mexican women in beauty contests.

Awards and achievements
Preceded by Ana Paula Castañares de los Cobos	Nuestra Belleza Morelos; 1997	Succeeded by Arlette Natera Martínez
Preceded by Yessica Salazar	Nuestra Belleza Mundo México; 1997	Succeeded by Vilma Zamora
Preceded by Vanessa Guzmán	Corona al Mérito; 2005	Succeeded by Dafne Molina
