= Jaime Camil =

Mexican actor, singer and media personality (born 1973)

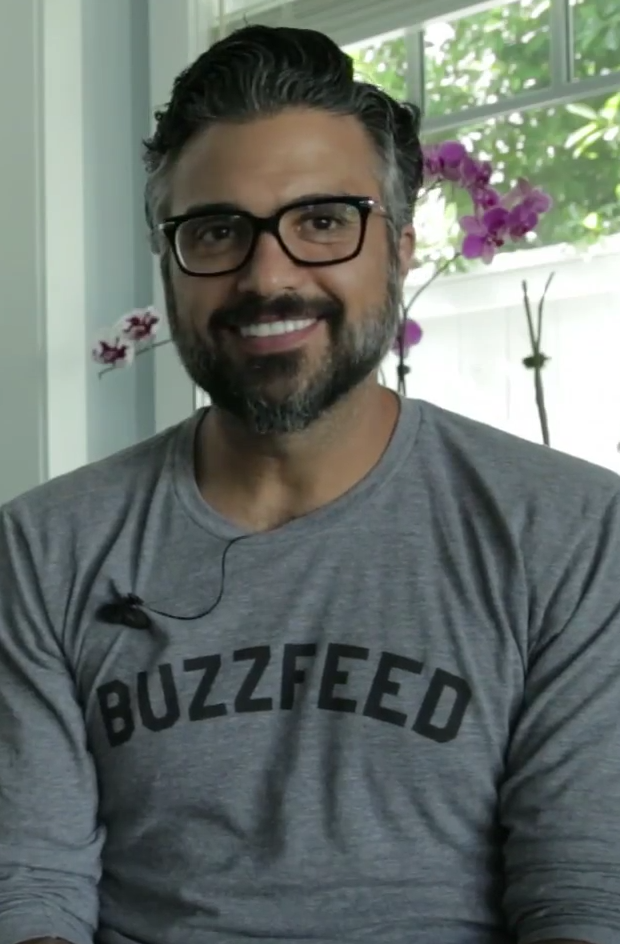
- Camil in 2015
- Born: Jaime Federico Said Camil de Saldanha da Gama; 22 July 1973 (age 53); Mexico City, Mexico
- Education: Anahuac University (BBA)
- Occupations: Actor, singer, television personality
- Years active: 1993–present
- Spouse: Heidi Balvanera (m. 2013)
- Children: 2
- Website: jaimecamil.com

Jaime Federico Said Camil de Saldanha da Gama (born 22 July 1973) is a Mexican actor, singer, and television personality. He is best known for his roles as Fernando Mendiola in La fea más bella and Rogelio de la Vega in Jane the Virgin, the latter of which earned him two nominations for the Critics' Choice Television Award for Best Supporting Actor in a Comedy Series.

== Early life ==
Camil was born on 22 July 1973 in Mexico City, Mexico. He is the son of Jaime Camil Garza, an Egyptian businessman, and Cecilia Saldanha da Gama, a Brazilian singer. His mother is a descendant through her mother of the Visconde de Abaeté, a former Brazilian Minister of finance and a patrilineal descendant of the 6th Count of Ponte, a Portuguese colonial administrator of Bahia from 1805 to 1809, and thus a descendant of one of the grandees of Portugal, of the upper court nobility. He earned a bachelor's degree in business administration from Universidad Anáhuac; studied acting in New York, Los Angeles, and London; and took classical opera training in Italy.

== Career ==
Camil started his career in 1993 as a radio commentator on Radioactivo 98.5. In 1995, he made his small-screen debut as a host in El show de Jaime Camil. He continued as a host in TV Azteca's Qué nochecita con Jaime Camil (1996) and Televisa's Operación triunfo (2002). In 2009, he co-hosted Aventura por México with Javier Poza, and in 2010 he hosted the Mexican edition of the game show, El Gran Show.

In 1999, he released his first album Para estar contigo, which took him to major cities in Mexico, South America, and the United States. After participating in El Ultimo Adios (The Last Goodbye), a tribute to victims of 9/11, Camil released his second album, Una vez más, in 2002. The singles Dime and Muriendo por ti rose to #17 and #24 Billboard's charts. In 2014 he stood on the other side of the microphone for the first time, directing the music video Perdon for the group Barston. Several of his albums went platinum after their release.

His work in the telenovela industry began with Mi destino eres tú (2000), followed by Mujer de madera (2004). The role which finally brought Jaime Camil universal renown was in the romantic comedy telenovela La fea más bella (2006–2007). His interpretation of "Don Fernando Mendiola" earned him a nomination for a Best Actor award in the Premios TVyNovelas. After Las tontas no van al cielo (2009) with Jacqueline Bracamontes, his next telenovela took him to South America for the Argentine/Mexican co-production of Los Exitosos Pérez (2009–2010) in which he played twins. 2012 brought Por Ella Soy Eva with Camil's most technically challenging role, and one of his most memorable. His character Juan Carlos disguised himself as an outspoken older woman reminiscent of Tootsie. La fea más bella and Por Ella Soy Eva comprised two of the three highest-rated telenovelas since Mexico started keeping records. A year later, his guest appearance on an episode of Devious Maids helped propel it to the third-highest-rated show of the series.

His film debut was in Delfines in 1997, but it wasn't until 2003 when film producers noticed his talent in acting. He co-starred in three different movies filmed in just a year; Puños rosas (rel. 2004), Zapata (rel. 2004) and 7 Días (rel. 2005). For his interpretation of "Tony" in 7 Días, Camil was awarded the 2006 Diosa de plata as Best Supporting Actor. 2007 saw the release of I Love Miami. He participated in the Chilean movie All Inclusive. He went on to play the lead in two romantic comedies, Recien cazado filmed in Baja California and Paris, and Regresa, both released in the winter of 2008–09. Camil voiced the role of Barry in the Spanish-language edition of the animated movie Bee Movie. In the Spanish version of Open Season he dubbed the voice of Elliot, the Mule Deer. He is cofounder and spokesman of the Short Shorts Film Festival Mexico, as of 2006 . and has starred in shorts Mariana made in Tepito and Volver, volver.

Camil has often said that his favorite venue is the stage. In 2005, he played Nestor Castillo in the Broadway-bound musical The Mambo Kings. Later in 2005 he performed in Latinologues on Broadway. His work in Mexican theater includes the role of Bernardo in a revival of West Side Story (2004), for which he won the Palmas de Oro award for Best Supporting Actor in a Musical. In 2007 he played the lead, Father Silvestre, in El diluvio que viene, which won the APT and ACPT awards for Best Actor in a Musical. He has played colorful characters such as Captain Hook in the musical Peter Pan (2007), and the Genie in the musical Aladdin (2008). In the summer of 2016, Jaime starred as Billy Flynn in the musical Chicago on Broadway in the Ambassador Theater. Camil played Flynn in an extended run from May 31 to July 31, 2016.

In the fall of 2014, he began acting in the role of Rogelio De La Vega, the biological father of Jane Villanueva and a telenovela star, in the CW network comedy, Jane the Virgin.

In 2018, he starred the main role of Panchito Pistoles on Legend of the Three Caballeros, which is based on the 1944 film The Three Caballeros, as well as taking over the role of the TaleSpin character Don Karnage for his appearance in the 2017 DuckTales reboot.

In 2019, he voiced the character Globgor in the final season of Star vs. the Forces of Evil.

In 2021, he played the role of Doc Lopez in the first season of Schmigadoon!. He returned in Season 2 in 2023 playing the role of Sergeant Rivera.

In 2023, he began hosting the CBS game show Lotería Loca, based on lotería, a traditional Mexican game of chance.

Camil sang the national anthem for the EchoPark Automotive Grand Prix NASCAR race.

== Personal life ==
Camil divides his time between Los Angeles and Mexico City with his wife, model Heidi Balvanera, and their two children. He has two half-siblings and three step-siblings. He speaks four languages: Spanish, English, Portuguese, and French. His older step-sister, Issabela Camil, is an actress and model, with an extensive career in Mexico and other Latin American countries.

== Filmography ==
=== Film ===
Year	Title	Role	Notes
2004	Puños rosas	Randy Garza	
2004	Zapata: El sueño de un héroe	Eufemio Zapata	
2005	Volver, volver	Jorge	Short film
2005	7 días	Tony Zamacona	
2006	I Love Miami	Alberto	
2006	Open Season	Elliot	Voice, Spanish dub
2007	Bee Movie	Barry B. Benson	Voice, Spanish dub
2008	Todo incluido (All inclusive)	Baldi	
2009	El Agente 00-P2	Tambo Macaw	
2009	I Do ... Knot	Sebastián	
2010	Regresa	Ernesto del Valle	
2011	Salvando al Soldado Pérez	Eladio	
2012	El cielo en tu mirada	Mateo Robles	
2012	Chiapas, el corazón del café	Géronimo	
2013	Zero Hour		Short film
2013	200 Cartas	Juan	
2013	Pulling Strings	Alejandro	
2014	Elsa & Fred	Waiter #1	
2015	Maurice, modisto de Señoras	Maurice	
2015	Los árboles mueren de pie	Director	
2016	The Secret Life of Pets	Fernando	Voice
2017	Coco	Papá Enrique Rivera	Voice
2018	Little Bitches	Mr. Villanueva	
2018	Hotel Transylvania 3: Summer Vacation	Chupacabra	Voice
2018	Glass Jaw	Erik Ryan	
2019	The Secret Life of Pets 2	Additional voices	
2019	Madness in the Method	Fernando	
2020	My Boyfriend's Meds	Hank	
2022	Kimi	Antonio Rivas	
2025	The Bad Guys 2	Handsome Jorge	Voice

=== Television ===
Year	Title	Role	Notes
1997–1998	Mirada de mujer	Antonio Ramírez	225 episodes
1999	Por tu amor	Roberto Flores	71 episodes
2000	Mi Destino Eres Tú	Mauricio Rodríguez	90 episodes
2000–2001	La hora pico	Host	20 episodes
2001	Diseñador de ambos sexos	Fernando Haddad	6 episodes
2002	La familia P. Luche	Himself	Episode: "El concurso de reclamos"
2004–2005	Mujer de madera	César Linares	205 episodes
2006–2007	La fea más bella	Fernando Mendiola	300 episodes
2007	Una familia de diez	Himself	Episode: "Adolfo"
2008	Las tontas no van al cielo	Santiago López Carmona	138 episodes
2009–2010	Los exitosos Pérez	Martín Pérez / Gonzalo González	171 episodes
2012	Por ella soy Eva	Juan Carlos Caballero / Eva María León Jaramillo Vda. de Zuloaga / Juan Perón	169 episodes
2013	Devious Maids	Oscar Valdez	Episode: "Taking Out the Trash"
2013–2014	Qué pobres tan ricos	Miguel Ángel Ruizpalacios	166 episodes
2014–2019	Jane the Virgin	Rogelio de la Vega	Series regular
2014	The Noite com Danilo Gentili	Himself	1 episode
2014	The Talk	Himself	Episode "The Cast of "Jane the Virgin"/iJustine/Jamie Krell" (Season 5, Episode 26)
2015	The 5th Annual Critics' Choice Television Awards	Himself	
2016	Last Week Tonight with John Oliver	Himself	Provided Spanish-language translation on Oliver's segment on multi-level marketing
2016–2020	Elena of Avalor	Julio	Voice, 12 episodes
2018	Legend of the Three Caballeros	Panchito Gonzalez	Voice, main role
2018–2021	DuckTales	Don Karnage	Voice, 4 episodes
2019	The Adventures in School!	Javier Maldonado	Series regular
2019	Charmed	Mr. Miranda	Episode: "Witch Perfect"
2019	Star vs. the Forces of Evil	Globgor	Voice, 5 episodes
2019	The Lion Guard	Pinguino	Voice, 3 episodes
2019–2020	BoJack Horseman	Jorge Chavez	Voice, 3 episodes
2020	Broke	Javier	Series regular
2020	Puppy Dog Pals	Hector	Voice, episode: "Suitcase Switcheroo/More Cowbell for Bob"
2021–2023	Schmigadoon!	Doc Lopez/Sergeant Rivera	Main role
2022–2025	Mickey Mouse Funhouse	Rocket Mouse	Voice, 4 episodes
2022	Celebrity Wheel of Fortune	Self - Celebrity Contestant	Episode: "Jaime Camil, Michael Rapaport and June Diane Raphael"
2022	The Idol of the People	Vicente Fernández	Main role
2023	Lotería Loca	Himself	Host
2024	Acapulco	Alejandro Vera	Guest star
2024–2025	Lopez vs Lopez	Josué Consuelos	Recurring
2026	Yo Gabba Gabbaland	Himself	Guest star

=== As producer ===
Year	Title	Notes
2012	Chiapas, el corazón del café	Co-producer

== Discography ==
- (1999) Para estar contigo
- (2002) Una vez más

== Accolades ==
Year	Award	Category	Work	Result	Ref.
2015	Teen Choice Awards	Choice TV Actor - Comedy	Jane the Virgin	Nominated	
2016	Teen Choice Awards	Choice TV Actor - Comedy	Jane the Virgin	Nominated	
2017	National Hispanic Media Coalition Impact Awards	Outstanding Performance in a Television Series	Jane the Virgin	Won	
2017	Teen Choice Awards	Choice TV Actor - Comedy	Jane the Virgin	Nominated	
2018	Teen Choice Awards	Choice TV Actor - Comedy	Jane the Virgin	Won	
2019	Teen Choice Awards	Choice TV Actor - Comedy	Jane the Virgin	Won	
