= El Sol (festival) =

Annually held festival in Spain

El Sol is the common name for the "Latin American Advertising Festival", which is held annually in Spain.

The festival, which takes place by the end of May, is organised by the Spanish Association of Advertising Agencies (AEAP), and is aimed at promoting advertising creativity.

== Golden Sun ==
Each year works from Latin American countries, along with Portugal and the Latin community in the USA, compete in the contest to get the golden sun awards (Sol de Oro in Spanish).
