= 2004 in Mexican television =

List of years in Mexican television
- … 1994; 1995; 1996; 1997; 1998; 1999; 2000; 2001; 2002; 2003; 2004; 2005; 2006; 2007; 2008; 2009; 2010; 2011; 2012; 2013; 2014 …
- Art; Archaeology; Architecture; Literature; Music; Philosophy; Science; +...

This is a list of Mexican television related events from 2004.

By the end of the year the country counted 43,8 per 1,000 inhabitants to have subscribed to a paid TV channel.

== Events ==
- 16 May - Radio and TV host Eduardo Videgaray wins the third season of Big Brother VIP.
- 4 July - Actress and TV host Roxanna Castellanos wins the fourth season of Big Brother VIP.

== Ongoing television shows ==
=== 1970s ===
- Plaza Sésamo (1972–present)

=== 2000s ===
- Big Brother México (2002-2005, 2015–present)

== Deaths ==
- Enrique Alonso ”Cachirulo”, (1923-2004) actor and TV host

== See also ==
- List of Mexican films of 2003
- 2003 in Mexico
