= 2002 in Mexican television =

List of years in Mexican television
- … 1992; 1993; 1994; 1995; 1996; 1997; 1998; 1999; 2000; 2001; 2002; 2003; 2004; 2005; 2006; 2007; 2008; 2009; 2010; 2011; 2012 …
- Art; Archaeology; Architecture; Literature; Music; Philosophy; Science; +...

This is a list of Mexican television related events from 2002.

== Events ==
- 3 March - The television reality show Big Brother México debuts on Televisa.
- 16 June - The first season of Big Brother México is won by Rocío Cárdenas.
- 28 July - Galilea Montijo is voted winner of the first season of Big Brother VIP.
- 10 November - Darina Márquez wins the first season of Operación Triunfo.

== Debuts ==
- 3 March - Big Brother México (2002-2005, 2015–present)

== Television shows ==
=== 1970s ===
- Plaza Sésamo (1972–present)

== Channels ==
Launches:

- 1 October: American Network

== See also ==
- List of Mexican films of 2002
- 2002 in Mexico
