= 2016 in Mexican television =

The following is a list of events affecting Mexican television in 2016. Events listed include television show debuts, finales, and cancellations; channel launches, closures, and re-brandings; stations changing or adding their network affiliations; and information about controversies and carriage disputes.

== Events ==
- 5 August-21 August - The 2016 Summer Olympics were broadcast on Canal Once and Canal 22.
- 31 December - Mexico's nationwide digital television transition was completed after the mandatory shutdown of analog television service for mid- and low-powered stations, which were given a one-year extension of the nationwide deadline of 31 December 2015.

== Television shows ==
=== Debuts ===
- 40 y 20 (2016–present)

=== Programs on-air ===
==== 1970s ====
- Plaza Sesamo (1972–present)

==== 1990s ====
- Acapulco Bay (1995–present)
- Corazon salvaje (1993–present)
- Esmeralda (1997–present)
- La usurpadora (1998–present)

==== 2000s ====
- Alma de hierro (2008–present)
- Big Brother México (2002-2005, 2015–present)
- Hotel Erotica Cabo (2006–present)
- Lo Que Callamos Las Mujeres (2001–present)

==== 2010s ====
- 40 y 20 (2016–present)
- Como dice el dicho (2011–present)
- La Voz... México (2011–present)
- México Tiene Talento (2014–present)
- Valiant Love (2012–present)

== Television stations ==
=== Station launches ===
Date	Market	Station	Channel	Affiliation	Notes/References
22 February	Zacatecas, Zacatecas	XHZHZ-TDT	24 (UHF/PSIP)	Non-commercial independent	
1 September	Zacatecas, Zacatecas	XHZAC-TDT	20 (UHF); 15 (PSIP)	Non-commercial independent	
17 October	Mexico City	XHCTMX-TDT	29 (UHF); 3 (PSIP)	Imagen Televisión	
7 November	Villahermosa, Tabasco	XHUJAT-TDT	35 (UHF/PSIP)	Public independent	
Unknown	Ciudad Juárez, Chihuahua	XEPM-TDT2	2.2 (PSIP)	Las Estrellas	XEPM's second digital subchannel broadcasts the same programming as main channel, but with El Paso, Texas area commercials.

=== Network affiliation changes ===
Date	Market	Station	Channel	Old affiliation	New affiliation	Notes/References
1 October	Matamoros, Tamaulipas (Brownsville/McAllen, Texas, USA)	XHRIO-TDT	15.1	MundoMax	The CW Plus	

== See also ==
- List of Mexican films of 2016
- 2016 in Mexico
