= 2021 in Mexican television =

The following is a list of events affecting Mexican television in 2021. Events listed include television show debuts, finales, and cancellations; channel launches, closures, and re-brandings; stations changing or adding their network affiliations; and information about controversies and carriage disputes.

== Events ==
- 31 December - Mexico's last English language television outlet, Border blasting station XHRIO-TDT in Matamoros, Tamaulipas, affiliated with the American-based The CW network, ceased operations after almost 42 years on the air.

=== Programs on-air ===
==== 1970s ====
- Plaza Sesamo (1972–present)

==== 1990s ====
- Acapulco Bay (1995–present)
- Corazon salvaje (1993–present)
- Esmeralda (1997–present)
- La usurpadora (1998–present)

==== 2000s ====
- Alma de hierro (2008–present)
- Big Brother México (2002-2005, 2015–present)
- Hotel Erotica Cabo (2006–present)
- Lo Que Callamos Las Mujeres (2001–present)

==== 2010s ====
- 40 y 20 (2016–present)
- Atrapada (2018–present)
- Casa de las Flores (2018–present)
- Como dice el dicho (2011–present)
- El Chiapo (2017–present)
- La Voz... México (2011–present)
- Por amar sin ley (2018–present)
- México Tiene Talento (2014–present)
- Rubirosa (2018–present)
- Sin tu mirads (2017–present)
- Soltereo con hijas (2019–present)
- Valiant Love (2012–present)

== Television stations ==
=== Station closures ===
Date	Market	Station	Channel	Affiliation	Sign-on date	Notes/References
31 December	Matamoros, Tamaulipas (Brownsville/McAllen, Texas, USA)	XHRIO-TDT	26.1 (UHF); 15.1 (PSIP)	The CW (via The CW Plus)	12 January 1979	

== See also ==
- List of Mexican films of 2021
- 2021 in Mexico
