= 2017 in Mexican television =

The following is a list of events affecting Mexican television in 2017. Events listed include television show debuts, finales, and cancellations; channel launches, closures, and re-brandings; stations changing or adding their network affiliations; and information about controversies and carriage disputes.

== Events ==
- January – The broadcast facility of defunct station XHK-TV in La Paz, Baja California Sur, is demolished.
- 31 May – In Tijuana, Baja California, XETV-TDT ends its 64-year-long history of providing English-language programming to the Tijiana-San Diego borderplex area when the area's affiliation with The CW in the United States moved to San Diego–based KFMB-DT2, and XETV's Canal 5 affiliation moving to the main channel while discontinuing its second digital subchannel upon the switch.

== Television programs ==
=== Debuts ===
- 40 y 20 (Since 2016)
- El Chiapo (Since 2017)
- Ingobernable (2017-201?)
- Sin tu mirads (Since 2017)

=== Miniseries ===
- The Day I Met El Chiapo

=== Programs on-air ===
==== 1970s ====
- Plaza Sesamo (Since 1972)

==== 1990s ====
- Acapulco Bay (Since 1995)
- Corazon salvaje (Since 1993)
- Esmeralda (Since 1997)
- La usurpadora (Since 1998)

==== 2000s ====
- Alma de hierro (Since 2008)
- Big Brother México (2002–2005, Since 2015)
- Hotel Erotica Cabo (Since 2006)
- Lo Que Callamos Las Mujeres (Since 2001)

==== 2010s ====
- 40 y 20 (Since 2016)
- Como dice el dicho (Since 2011)
- El Chiapo (Since 2017)
- La Voz... México (Since 2011)
- México Tiene Talento (Since 2014)
- Sin tu mirads (Since 2017)
- Valiant Love (Since 2012)

== Television stations ==
=== Station launches ===
Date	Market	Station	Channel	Affiliation	Notes/References
11 December	Querétaro, Querétaro	XHPBQR-TDT	11 (VHF); 24 (PSIP)	Non-commercial independent	

=== Network affiliation changes ===
Date	Market	Station	Channel	Affiliation	Notes/References
1 June	Tijuana, Baja California (San Diego, California, United States)	XETV-TDT	6.1	The CW	Canal 5
1 July	Tijuana, Baja California (San Diego, California, United States)	XHAS-TDT	33.1	Telemundo	Azteca América

=== Station closures ===
Date	Market	Station	Channel	Affiliation	Sign-on date	Notes/References
1 June	Tijuana, Baja California (San Diego, California, US)	XETV-TDT2	6.2	Canal 5	Unknown	Canal 5 moves to XETV's main channel after disaffiliating from The CW.
1 July	Tecate/Tijuana, Baja California (San Diego, California, US)	XHDTV-TDT2	49.2	15 March 2017	Azteca América	

== See also ==
- List of Mexican films of 2017
- 2017 in Mexico
