= 2019 in Mexican television =

The following is a list of events affecting Mexican television in 2019. Events listed include television show debuts, finales, and cancellations; channel launches, closures, and re-brandings; stations changing or adding their network affiliations; and information about controversies and carriage disputes.

== Television shows ==
=== Debuts ===
- Soltereo con hijas (2019–present)

=== Programs on-air ===
==== 1970s ====
- Plaza Sesamo (1972–present)

==== 1990s ====
- Acapulco Bay (1995–present)
- Corazon salvaje (1993–present)
- Esmeralda (1997–present)

==== 2000s ====
- Alma de hierro (2008–present)
- Big Brother México (2002-2005, 2015–present)
- Hotel Erotica Cabo (2006–present)
- Lo Que Callamos Las Mujeres (2001–present)

==== 2010s ====
- 40 y 20 (2016–present)
- Atrapada (2018–present)
- Casa de las Flores (2018–present)
- Como dice el dicho (2011–present)
- El Chiapo (2017–present)
- La Voz... México (2011–present)
- Por amar sin ley (2018-2019)
- México Tiene Talento (2014–present)
- Rubirosa (2018–present)
- Sin tu mirads (2017–present)
- Valiant Love (2012–present)

=== Ending this year ===
- LOL: Last One Laughing (2018-2019)
- 5 July - Por amar sin ley (2018-2019)

== Television stations ==
=== Station launches ===
Date	Market	Station	Channel	Affiliation	Notes/References
1 January	Chihuahua, Chihuahua	XHCHZ-TDT2	24.2 (UHF); 9.1 (PSIP)	Nu9ve	
18 February	La Paz, Baja California Sur	XHCPBC-TDT	23 (UHF); 10 (PSIP)	Commercial independent	
29 April	Tepic, Nayarit	XHRTTS-TDT	26 (UHF); 8 (PSIP)	Commercial independent	
28 October	Cabo, Baja California Sur	XHCPCS-TDT	35 (UHF); 10 (PSIP)	Commercial independent TV Mar	
31 October	Mexico City	XHFAMX-TDT	28 (UHF); 8 (PSIP)	La Octava	

=== Network affiliation changes ===
Date	Market	Station	Channel	Old affiliation	New affiliation	Notes/References
1 January	Chihuahua, Chihuahua	XHAUC-TDT	32 (UHF); 6 (PSIP)	Nu9ve	Independent (no programming)	
24 January	Chihuahua, Chihuahua	XHAUC-TDT	32 (UHF); 6 (PSIP)	Independent (no programming)	Milenio Televisión	
May	Chihuahua, Chihuahua	XHAUC-TDT	32 (UHF); 6 (PSIP)	Milenio Television	Multimedios Televisión	

== Deaths ==
- 14 or 17 February – Olivia Leyva, actress, television presenter and model

== See also ==
- List of Mexican films of 2019
- 2019 in Mexico
