= 2019 in television =

2019 in television may refer to

- 2019 in American television for television-related events in the United States.
  - List of 2019 American television debuts for television debut related events in the United States.
- 2019 in Australian television for television-related events in Australia.
- 2019 in British television for television-related events in the United Kingdom.
  - 2019 in Scottish television for television-related events in Scotland.
- 2019 in Canadian television for television-related events in Canada.
- 2019 in Estonian television for television-related events in Estonia.
- 2019 in Irish television for television-related events in the Republic of Ireland.
- 2019 in Japanese television for television-related events in Japan.
- 2019 in Mexican television for television-related events in Mexico.
- 2019 in Philippine television for television-related events in the Philippines.
- 2019 in Tamil television for television-related events in India for Tamil language.
