= 2014 in Mexican television =

This is a list of Mexican television related events from 2014.

== Events ==
- 12 December - 43-year-old singer Pablo López wins the first season of México Tiene Talento.
- 14 December - Guido Rochin wins the fourth season of La Voz... México.

== Debuts ==
- 19 October - México Tiene Talento (2014–present)

== Television shows ==
=== 1970s ===
- Plaza Sésamo (1972–present)

=== 2010s ===
- La Voz... México (2011–present)

== See also ==
- List of Mexican films of 2014
- 2014 in Mexico
