= Secundino Zuazo =

Spanish architect and city planner (1887–1971)

Secundino Zuazo Ugalde (1887–1971) was a Spanish architect and city planner.

Born in Bilbao, he graduated from Madrid's architecture school in 1913, and lived there until his death.

Zuazo was a rationalist architect, among the most important of his generation. The best known of his works are the Casa de las Flores and Nuevos Ministerios of Madrid (whose construction he did not direct). In city planning, his plan for the Comarca of Madrid and his project for the extension of the Paseo de la Castellana (also in Madrid) are important.

In his earlier years, Secundino's work was characterized by an inclination toward traditional architecture. A trip that he took to Netherlands and other parts of central Europe left an impression on him of the rationalistic and simple design of the architecture of those areas. Function became his central theme. Upon returning to Spain, he showed a keen interest in collective housing projects, with a view to improving the sanitary conditions prevalent during that time in Spanish cities.

Secundino rose to the august level of state-level planner during the Second Spanish Republic. The ensuing phase was the most productive in his career as an urban planner. Unfortunately, with the breakout of the Civil War, Secundino had to flee to France. Things did not get any better upon his return to Spain, where he was imprisoned.

== Los Nuevos Ministerios ==
Before the Civil War had broken out and Secundino had fled to France, he was commissioned by Indalecio Prieto, the minister of Public Works, to design a complex that would house the ministries. The site chosen for the complex was a demolished racetrack. Secundino came up in 1933 with a design that had a big open space in the building center, around which were plazas. The design included several ponds in the vicinity of the various ministries. But war interrupted the work on the complex. After Secundino fled, the building was completed by a group of architects chosen by the Fascist regime. Secundino's were not followed completely, and the buildings were built in a different manner.

There are suspicions that Zuazo shaped the plant as the Communist emblem of the hammer and sickle, since he was a supporter of the Soviet Union. The reference would not be noticed by the later Francoist architects.

== The House of Flowers ==
Between 1930 and 1932, Secundino worked on another of his iconic buildings, The House of Flowers. The building was an apartment cluster located in the Argüelles Madrid.

Before Secundino started work on this project, Madrid's bourgeois architecture was infamous for its showy facades and excessively ornate corner towers. Hygiene was a problem in them, for the rooms were narrow and the doorways received little light. They were no more than large rectangular blocks, a result of the Madrid widening plan initiated by Castro in 1860.

Secundino endowed his apartments with all that Madrid apartments before The House of Flowers lacked. There were attached toilets. His design allowed abundant light to enter, and ventilation was improved. There were gardens on the terraces.

Secundino achieved a notable architectural feat in The House of Flowers. Characterized by a clean architectural form, the building was a mesmerizing interplay between volume and void. Portals, windows and terraces created the effect of variety. The straight and boxed corners of these were novel at that time. The House of Flowers was a pioneering work of architecture.

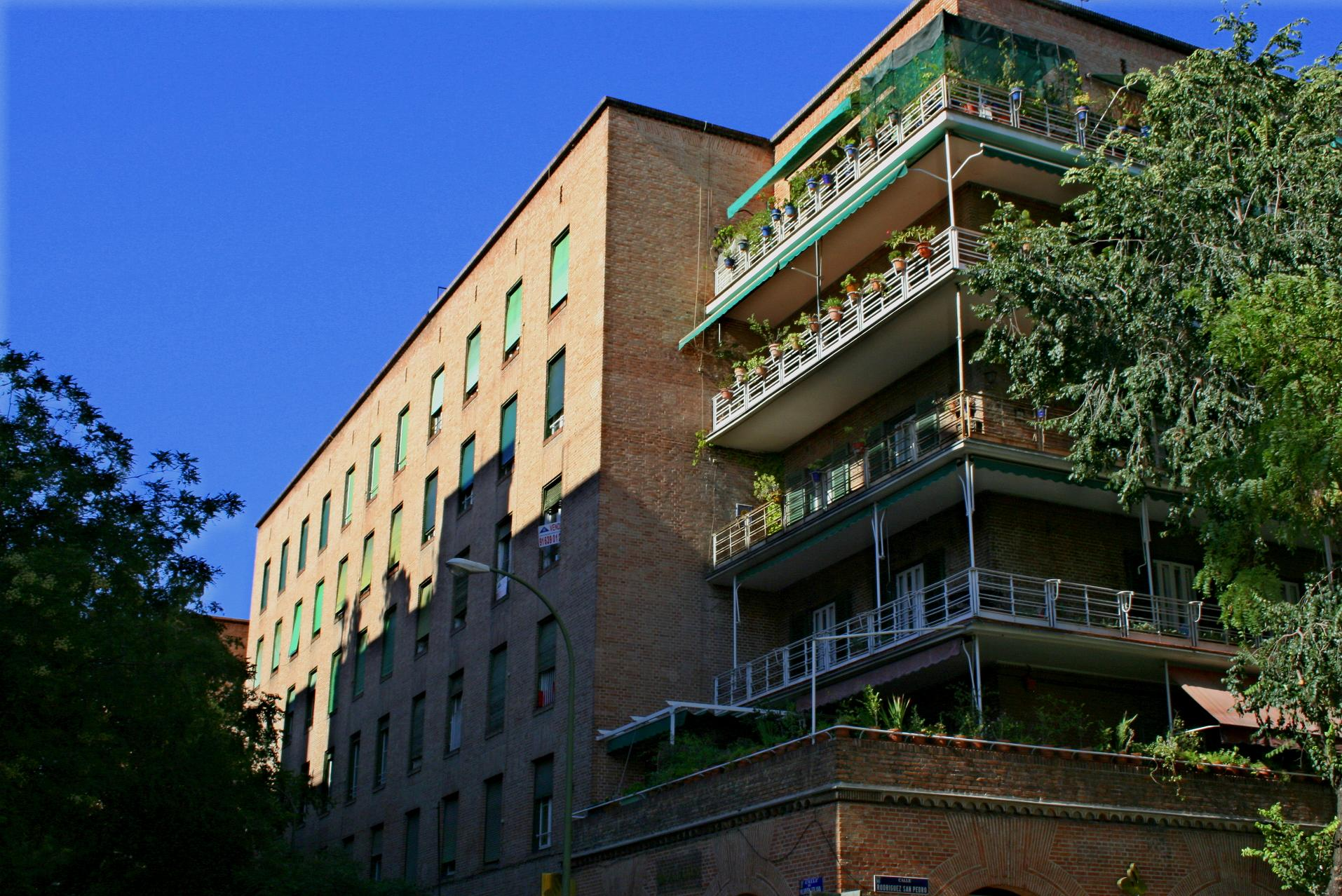
The Casa de las Flores.

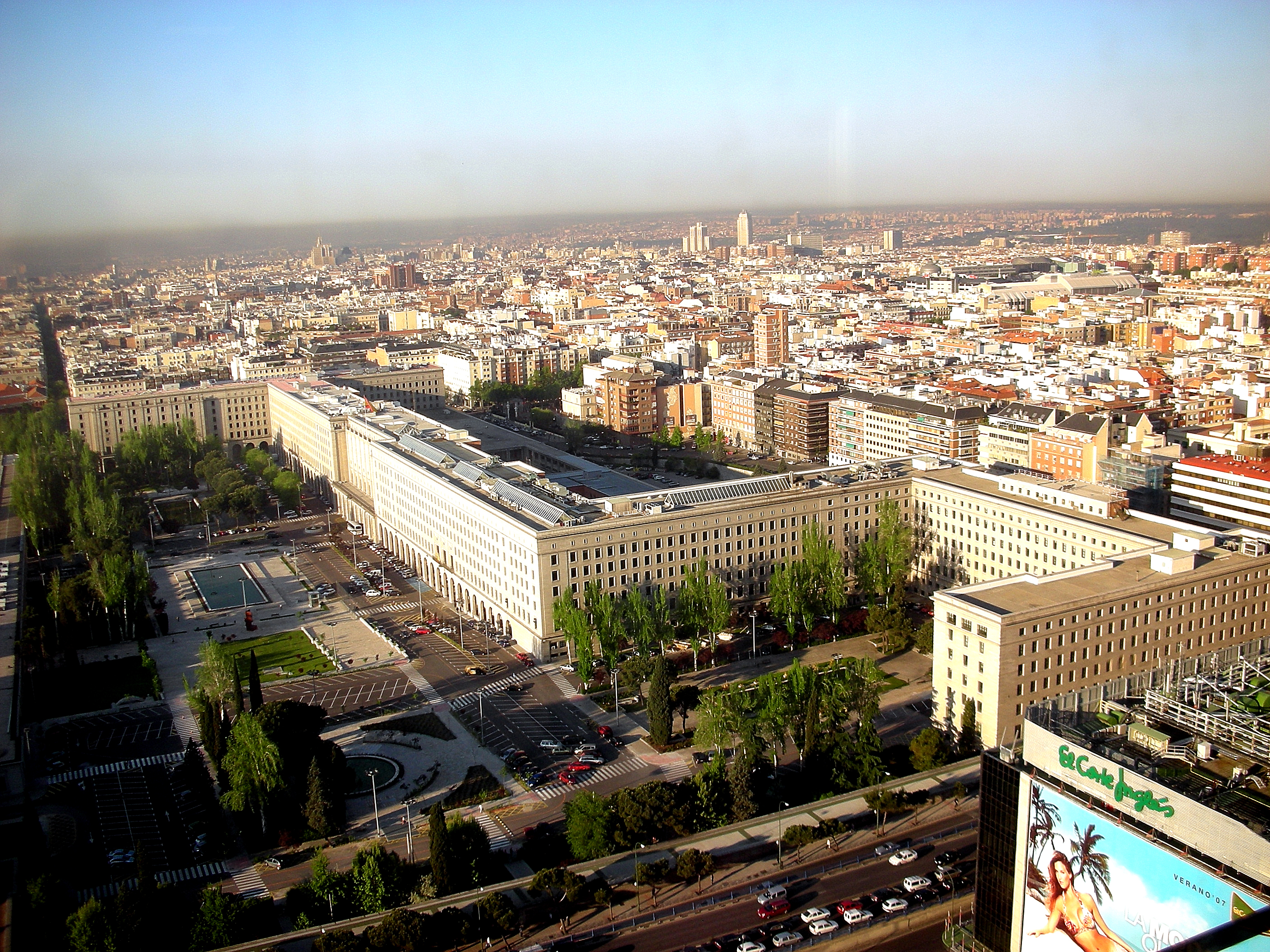
A view of Nuevos Ministerios.

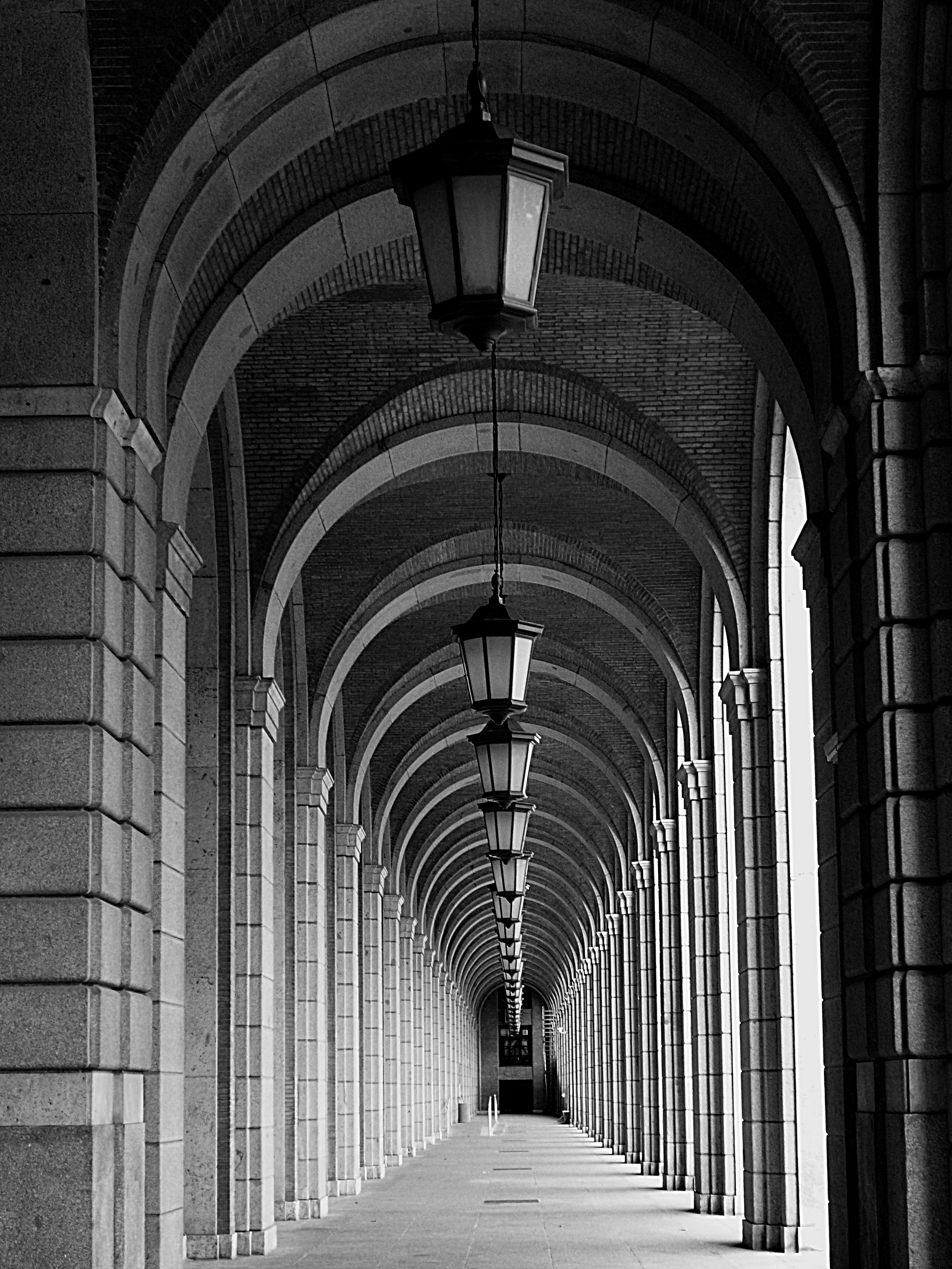
The cloisters of Nuevos Ministerios.

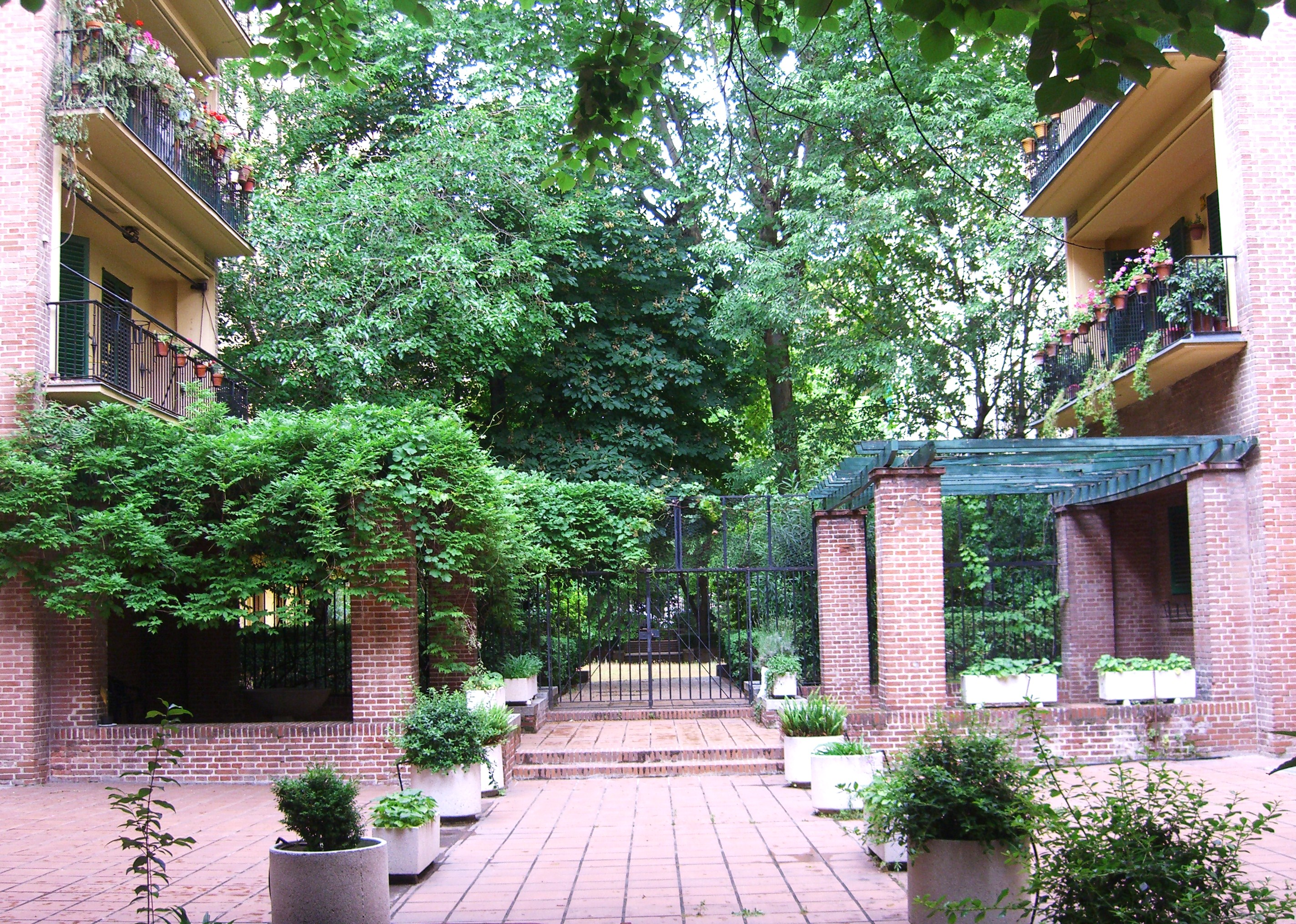
Casa de las Flores in Madrid

.
