= 2013 in Mexican television =

This is a list of Mexican television related events from 2013.

== Events ==
- 15 December - Marcos Razo wins the third season of La Voz... México.

== Television shows ==
=== 1970s ===
- Plaza Sésamo (1972–present)

=== 2010s ===
- La Voz... México (2011–present)

== See also ==
- List of Mexican films of 2013
- 2013 in Mexico
