= 2015 in Mexican television =

This is a list of Mexican television related events from 2015.

== Events ==
- 11 March - The Federal Telecommunications Institute awards national television network concessions to Grupo Imagen and Grupo Radio Centro.
- 10 April - Grupo Radio Centro announces it will only pay the security deposit on its network concession instead of the full payment, leaving Imagen alone in building a national television network.
- 17 December - Eduardo "Chile" Miranda wins the fourth season of Big Brother México.
- 20 December - 24-year-old violinist Fernando Badillo wins the second season of México Tiene Talento.

== Debuts ==
- 21 September - Big Brother México (2002–2005, 2015–present)

== Television shows ==
=== 1970s ===
- Plaza Sésamo (1972–present)

=== 2010s ===
- La Voz... México (2011–present)
- México Tiene Talento (2014–present)

== See also ==
- List of Mexican films of 2015
- 2015 in Mexico
