= 2012 in Mexican television =

This is a list of Mexican television related events from 2012.

== Events ==
- 27 July-12 August - The 2012 Summer Olympics in London, England, United Kingdom, is broadcast over Televisa Regional and TV Azteca.
- 16 December - Luz Maria Ramírez wins the second season of La Voz... México.

== Television shows ==
=== 1970s ===
- Plaza Sésamo (1972–present)

=== 2010s ===
- La Voz... México (2011–present)

== See also ==
- List of Mexican films of 2012
- 2012 in Mexico
