= XHZAC-TDT =

TV station in Zacatecas City, Mexico

- Zacatecas, Zacatecas; Mexico
- Channels: Digital: 20 (UHF); Virtual: 15
- Branding: Canal 15

Ownership
- Owner: Grupo Radiofónico B-15; (Integración Mexicana con Visión en Zacatecas, A.C.)

History
- First air date: September 1, 2016
- Former channel number: 20.2
- Call sign meaning: Zacatecas

Technical information
- Licensing authority: CRT
- ERP: 8.93 kW
- HAAT: 454 m (1,490 ft)
- Transmitter coordinates: 22°44′50.46″N 102°33′12.17″W

Links
- Website: 20tvzacatecas.com

XHZAC-TDT is a television station on virtual channel 15 in Zacatecas, Zacatecas. It is a noncommercial social station owned by Grupo Radiofónico B-15 through concessionaire Integración Mexicana con Visión en Zacatecas, A.C.

== History ==
XHZAC and three additional television stations in Zacatecas were awarded in 2015. B-15, which owns radio stations in Fresnillo, had already been operating a television station for cable and satellite in Zacatecas, known as Conoce México Televisión, which began operations on April 16, 2008. Prior to going to air on broadcast, Conoce México was revamped and renamed 20tv Zacatecas.

20tv Zacatecas primarily carries grupera music videos as well as newscasts; the news programs are also aired by Mexicanal for viewers outside of Mexico. The program schedule attracted the interest of the Federal Telecommunications Institute, which stated that it would seek to verify that social use television stations were being used for their intended purposes.

When it launched, XHZAC-TDT used virtual channel 20.2, in order not to interfere with 20.1 TV UNAM on the SPR transmitter. This was not a legal assignment, as channel 20 is reserved for TV UNAM nationwide. Instead, XHZAC was assigned virtual channel 15 and began using it on December 11, 2017.
