= 2005 in Mexican television =

This is a list of Mexican television related events from 2005.

== Events ==
- 27 April - Evelyn Nieto wins season 3 of Big Brother México
- 3 July - Singer Sasha Sökol wins the sixth and final season of Big Brother VIP

== Television shows ==
=== 1970s ===
- Plaza Sésamo (1972–present)

== Ending this year ==
- Big Brother México (2002-2005, 2015–present)

== See also ==
- List of Mexican films of 2005
- 2005 in Mexico
