= List of Mexican films of 2012 =

This is a list of Mexican films released in 2012.

Title	Director	Cast	Genre	Notes
Cristiada (film)	Dean Wright	Andy Garcia, Eva Longoria, Eduardo Verastegui, Rubén Blades, Peter O'Toole	Drama	
After Lucia	Michel Franco	Tessa Ía González Norvind	Drama	Winner Un Certain Regard at the 2012 Cannes Film Festival
Post Tenebras Lux (film)	Carlos Reygadas	Adolfo Jiménez Castro, Nathalia Acevedo	Drama	Winner Prix de la mise en scène at the 2012 Cannes Film Festival

== See also ==
- List of 2012 box office number-one films in Mexico
