= 2011 in Mexican television =

This is a list of Mexican television related events from 2011.

== Events ==
- 18 December - Óscar Cruz wins the first season of La Voz... México.

== Debuts ==
- 11 September - La Voz... México (2011–present)

== Television shows ==
=== 1970s ===
- Plaza Sésamo (1972–present)

== Channels ==
Closures:

- 5 September: American Network

== See also ==
- List of Mexican films of 2011
- 2011 in Mexico
