= 2003 in Mexican television =

This is a list of Mexican television related events from 2003.

== Events ==
- 29 June - Silvia Irabien wins the second season of Big Brother México.
- 1 December - Radio and TV host Omar Chaparro wins the second season of Big Brother VIP.

== Television shows ==
=== Debuts ===
Show	Station	Premiere Date
Henry's World/Connie the Cow/Elmo's World/Barney & Friends	Discovery Kids	January 6
The Save-Ums!	Discovery Kids	August 4

== See also ==
- List of Mexican films of 2003
- 2003 in Mexico
