= Casa de las Flores =

Building in Chamberí, Madrid, Spain

Coordinates: 40.4324°N 3.7162°W

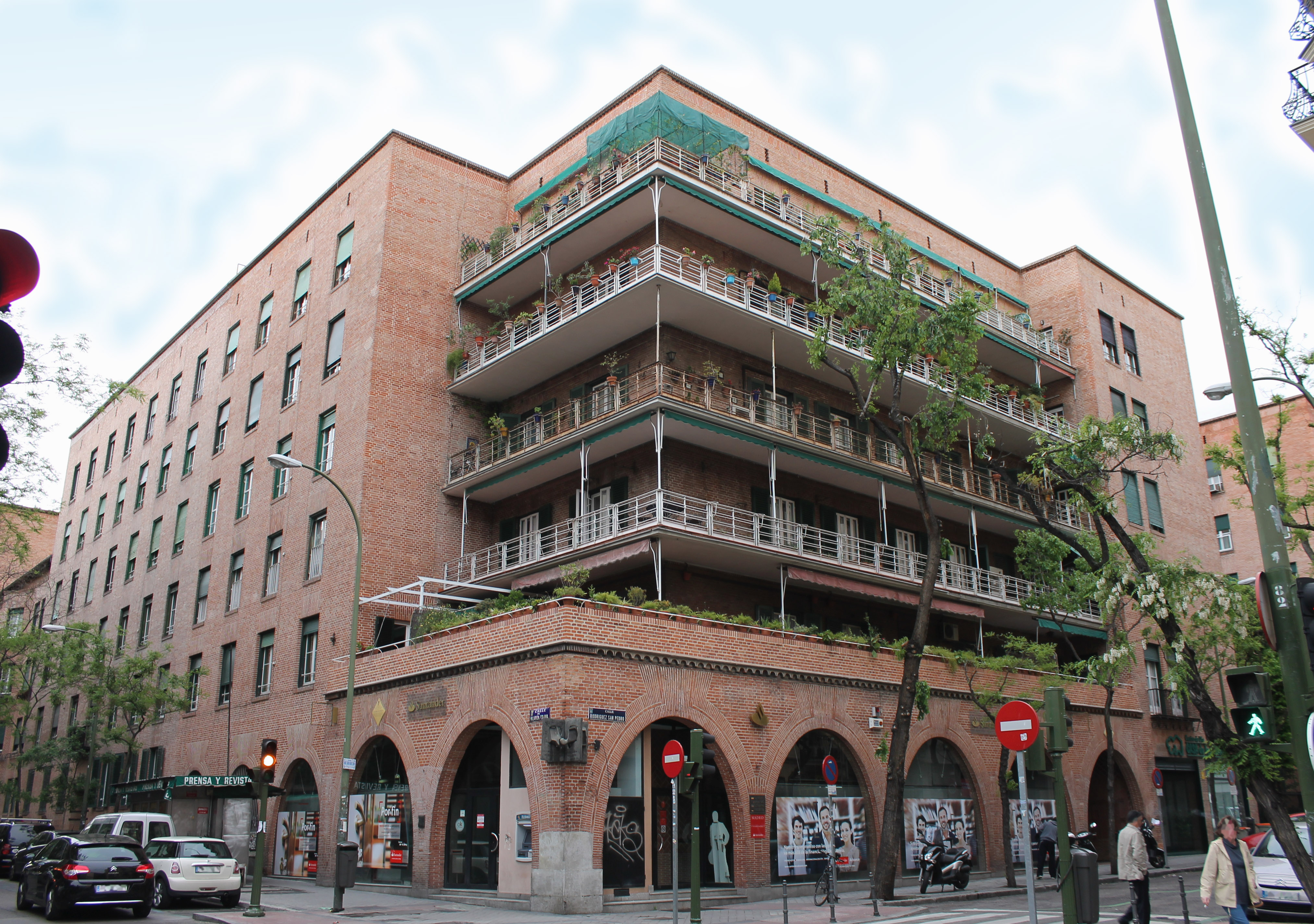

General information
- Location: Chamberí
- Address: Calle de Hilarión Eslava 2; 28015 Madrid, Spain

Design and construction
- Architect(s): Secundino Zuazo Ugalde

The Casa de las Flores is a block of flats in the Chamberí district of Madrid, designed by Secundino Zuazo in 1931. The distribution of spaces with its central landscaped corridor has provided a model for architecture students studying the fifties and sixties. It is located on the corner of Calle de la Princesa (Hilarión Eslava, Rodríguez San Pedro, Gaztambide and Meléndez Valdés streets), and has balconies decorated with flower boxes, from which the name of the building is derived. The poet Pablo Neruda lived in this house in 1934, and the writer Emilio Carrere lived in it until his death. In 1981, the building began the process of being registered as a bien de interés cultural (cultural heritage) site.

== History ==
The house could have been designed by the German architect Michael Fleischer, who in those years collaborated in the Secundino Zuazo studio. The block of flats was commissioned by the Banco Hispano Colonial that financed the project with the help of the Instituto Nacional de Previsión; the house was an early part of the Plan Castro for the expansion of Madrid. It was completed just at the moment of the proclamation of the Second Republic. When Pablo Neruda was appointed consul in Madrid in 1934, his friend Rafael Alberti found this house for him as a place to live. During the defence of Madrid during the Civil War, the Battle of Ciudad Universitaria occurred near the house, which caused it to suffer great damage. The house was restored in the forties. In 1981 it was declared a National Monument.

== Characteristics ==
The five-story building was built in brick, the ground floor has a series of elliptical arches that coincide with the arcade supports and the windows of some stores. It has two hundred and eighty-eight houses arranged in three landscaped courtyards, of which the central one is the larger. The floors are distributed in a double linear block: two blocks arranged in parallel, with the stair cases arranged as bridges.
