= Hotel Erotica Cabo =

- Created by: Gary Dean Orona
- Written by: Don Bloomfield; Nancy French; A.G. Lawrence
- Directed by: Gary Dean Orona
- Starring: Divini Rae; Kimberly Fisher
- Music by: Eric Amdahl
- Original language: English

Production
- Producer: Billy Frank
- Running time: 22 min. per episode
- Production companies: OronaFilm; HBO Entertainment

Original release
- Release: January 6 – March 31, 2006

Hotel Erotica Cabo is a 2004 late-night Cinemax softcore television series which first aired in 2006 and was directed by Gary Dean Orona and starring actresses Kimberly Fisher and Divini Rae.

== Plot line ==
The episodes of this anthology series center around Corrine and Amanda, two young women who are the managers at a beautiful resort named Hotel Cabo located in Cabo San Lucas, Mexico. Hotel guests have romantic experiences and fantasies with lovers, strangers, and sometimes with Corrine or Amanda.

The series was referenced in the CMT hit reality game show Sweet Home Alabama, after contestant Michael Dean appeared on the series. Dean was eliminated during that episode.

== Episode list ==
1. "Addicted to Love" – January 6, 2006
2. "Mighty Mike Returns" – January 13, 2006
3. "The Amazing Woody" – January 20, 2006
4. "Last Tango in Cabo" – January 27, 2006
5. "Primal Urge" – February 3, 2006
6. "Wild Cards" – February 10, 2006
7. "Chocolate Covered Cherries" – February 17, 2006
8. "Skin Deep" – February 24, 2006
9. "Stolen Kisses" – March 3, 2006
10. "Summer Lovers" – March 10, 2006
11. "Whole Lotto Love" – March 17, 2006
12. "El Fiero" – March 24, 2006
13. "Eyes Wide Open" – March 31, 2006
