= Plaza Sésamo =

Educational children's television series for preschoolers

- Also known as: Sésamo (2016–2022)
- Genre: Children's television series; Educational
- Created by: Joan Ganz Cooney; Lloyd Morrisett; Muppet characters by Jim Henson
- Based on: Sesame Street
- Countries of origin: Mexico; Colombia

Production
- Running time: 30 minutes
- Production companies: Children's Television Workshop/Sesame Workshop; Xerox; Televisa; Discovery Kids Latin America; RCN Televisión

Original release
- Network: El Canal de las Estrellas (1970's–2003, Mexico); Canal 5 (1970's–1980's, 2000's–2016, Mexico); Canal RCN (2013–2016); Syndication (1970's–present, Latin America and Puerto Rico); Azteca 7 (2020–present, Mexico)
- Release: October 6, 1972 – present

Plaza Sésamo (English: Sesame Plaza) (Note: Formerly known as "Sésamo" from 2016 to 2022.) is the first international co-production of the educational children's television series Sesame Street, which originated in the United States. Its first season premiered in Mexico in 1972, and the last season ended in 2018 during the holiday season and the 50th anniversary of Sesame Street, but the show returned in 2020. It has also aired throughout Latin America, to a potential audience of 25 million children in 34 countries. Unlike some of the earliest co-productions, which consisted of dubbed versions of Sesame Street sketches, Plaza Sésamo along with Vila Sésamo were actual co-productions. Half of the show was adapted from the American show, and half was original material, created in Mexico by Mexican writers, performers, and producers. The first season consisted of 130 half-hour episodes. The Plaza Sésamo development process was similar to that of the American show. Its goals were developed by local experts in television, child development, and early education during curriculum seminars in Caracas, Venezuela. Sésamo's goals emphasized problem solving and reasoning, and also included perception, symbolic representation, human diversity, and the child's environment. Other goals included community cooperation, family life, nutrition, health, safety, self-esteem, and expressing emotions. Early reading skills were taught through the whole language method. The show's budget for the first and second seasons was approximately US$1.6 million.

The show's set consisted of a typical neighborhood square (or plaza) found throughout the region. New Muppets and human characters were created. In all, four seasons of Sésamo were filmed. The first season resulted in some of the highest ratings in Mexico. The fourth season, filmed in 1995, was broadcast in the U.S., making it the first foreign-language co-production shown in the U.S. Studies conducted after the first season of Sésamo showed that it had a demonstrable impact on the educational achievement levels of its young audience. Highly significant difference were found in tests about general knowledge, letters, and numbers after children were exposed to the show. Significant gains were made in several cognitive and perceptual areas by regular viewers, even in subjects that were not taught by the show. Characters from the show participated in campaigns promoting health and nutrition; in 2009, Sesame Workshop, the organization responsible for the show, was awarded the "Champion of Health" award by the Pan American Health Organization (PAHO) for its efforts.

== Background ==
A few months after the 1969 debut of Sesame Street on PBS in the US, producers from several countries all around the world approached the Children's Television Workshop (CTW, later Sesame Workshop, or "the Workshop"), the organization responsible for the show's production, to create and produce versions of Sesame Street in their countries. Co-creator Joan Ganz Cooney was approached by German public television officials about a year after the American version debuted. Many years later, Cooney recalled, "To be frank, I was really surprised, because we thought we were creating the quintessential American show. We thought the Muppets were quintessentially American, and it turns out they're the most international characters ever created". She hired former CBS executive Mike Dann, who left commercial television to become her assistant, as a CTW vice-president. One of Dann's tasks was to field offers to produce versions of Sesame Street in other countries. By summer 1970, he had made the first international agreements for what the CTW came to call "co-productions".

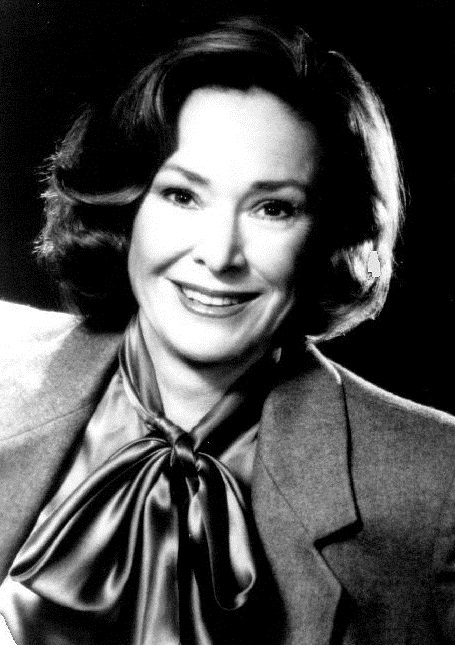
Sesame Street co-creator Joan Ganz Cooney, in 1985. Cooney was surprised that other countries were interested in producing their own versions of the American show.

As of 2006, there were 20 active co-productions. In 2000, CTW vice-president Charlotte Cole estimated that there were over 120 million viewers of all international versions of Sesame Street, and by the show's 40th anniversary in 2009, they were seen in more than 140 countries. Doreen Carvajal of The New York Times reported that income from the co-productions accounted for US$96 million in 1994. Cole stated, "Children's Television Workshop (CTW) can be regarded as the single largest informal educator of young children in the world". Most of the early international versions were what Cole called "fairly simple", consisting of dubbed versions of the show with local language voice-overs and instructional cutaways. Studies conducted on the effects of several co-productions found that viewers of these shows gain basic skills from watching them.

== Production ==
Plaza Sésamo debuted in Mexico on the Televisa network in 1972. According to Sesame Street producer Gregory J. Gettas, Plazo Sésamo was one of Sesame Street's first true co-productions, programs that were developed using a variant of a flexible model, called the CTW model, created by the producers and creators of the American show, in the countries they aired. Like the American show in the late 1960s, the producers and researchers in Mexico conducted a curriculum seminar in Caracas, Venezuela. The goals they developed, however, were significantly different from the goals developed in the U.S. For example, the Plaza Sésamo team emphasized problem solving and reasoning. Their educational goals included perception, symbolic representation, human diversity, and the child's environment. Other goals included community cooperation, family life, nutrition, health, safety, self-esteem, and expressing emotions. The show was designed to address the educational needs of the region's 25 million children in 34 countries, including its target audience of 7 million children between the ages of 3 and 6 in Mexico alone. Despite their common language, the show's Latin American viewers had a wide variety of customs and lifestyles. The show's budget for the first and second seasons was approximately US$1.6 million.

The American-produced and dubbed segments were analyzed for cultural appropriateness. If any segments were considered "too American", meaning that they contained English writing on the screen, showed the American flag, or overtly referred to American history, they were removed. The board was responsible for choosing content from the CTW's inventory, and it had to satisfy the curriculum goals chosen by the Latin American researchers. They chose to teach reading through the whole language method, which emphasizes teaching children to recognize entire words or phrases, as opposed to phonetics, the way the American show taught reading. The Mexican producers and writers designed a distinctive set that appeared different than the American set and consisted of a typical neighborhood square (or plaza) found throughout the region. The set included a background of mountains, a vacant lot with playground equipment, houses, a combination repair shop and store-cafe, and the plaza's central fountain and benches. New music, written and performed by Latin American artists, was recorded, and writers and actors from different Latin American countries like Mexico, Argentina, Chile, and Venezuela, were hired.

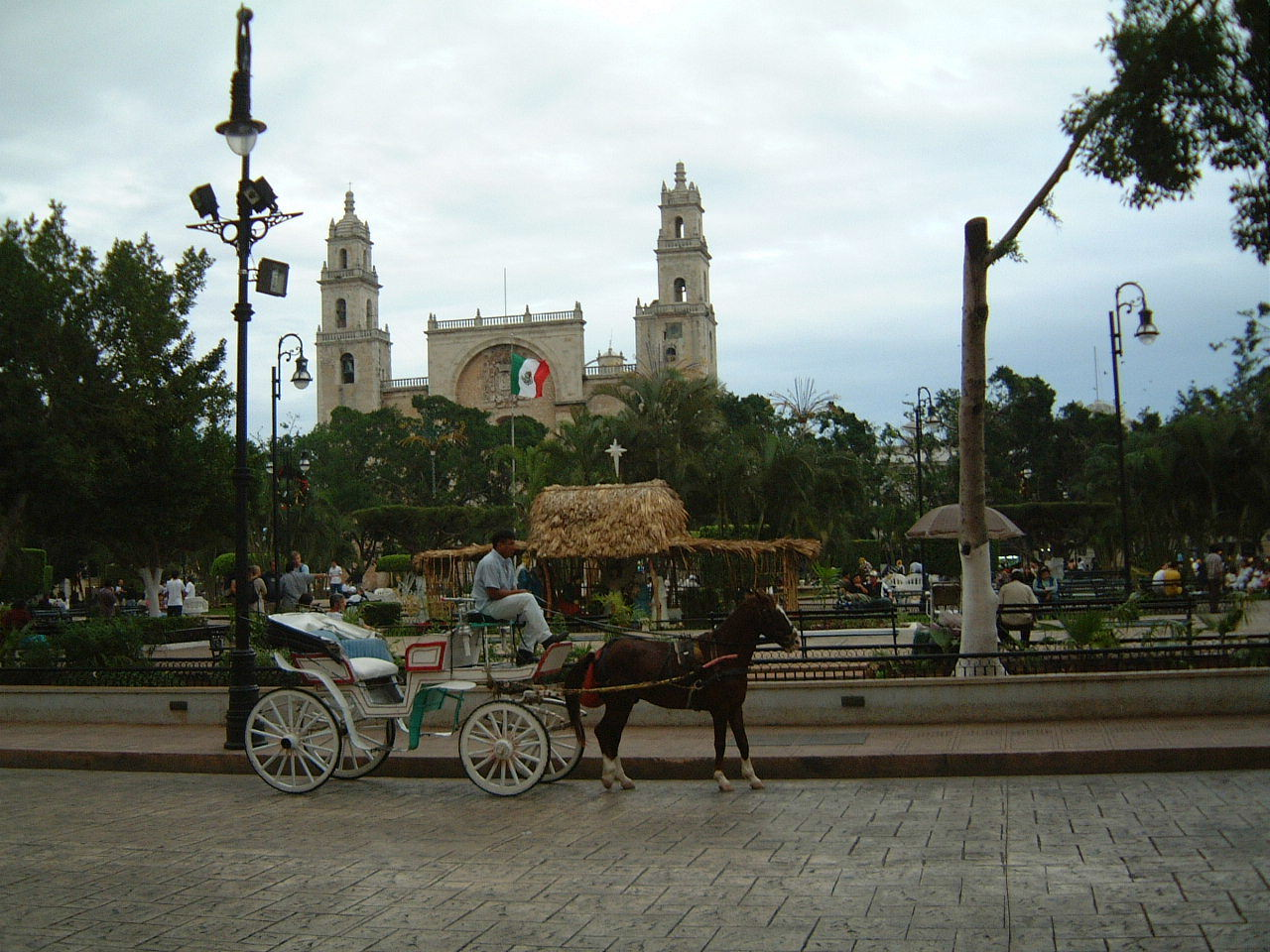
A plaza, the setting for Plaza Sésamo, in Mérida

New Muppet characters were created and performed by puppeteers trained in Mexico City. Abelardo, a giant parrot, was modeled after the American show's Big Bird, and like Big Bird, was a full-body puppet that was controlled by the puppeteer from inside the costume. Paco, a grouchy green parrot, was based on Oscar the Grouch. Abelardo and Paco were both played by Justo Martinez. The Muppets Beto and Enrique, who were based upon Bert and Ernie of the American show, were called "national favorites" by the UPI less than three years after the show's premiere. In 1975, Enrique and Beto were used to promote Mexico's nationwide free vaccination campaign.

130 half-hour episodes of the show's first season were shot in Mexico City entirely in Spanish, under the control of a Mexican research and production team. About half the show's material was adapted from the American show and dubbed into Spanish, while the other half was produced in Mexico and included animation, live-action films, and studio sequences with human actors and Muppets. A Mexican board of advisers, who set curriculum goals for the show, approved all content, both Mexican and American, something that followed the newly established policies of the CTW. Mexican psychologist Rogelio Diaz-Guerrero was the first chair of the show's advisory board, which was later expanded to include child-development and educators from other Latin American countries, so that Plaza Sésamo could be broadcast throughout Central and South America, including the Dominican Republic and Puerto Rico.

The third season, which was filmed in 1983 and consisted of 130 half-hour episodes, had different goals than the previous seasons. One of its goals was instructing its viewers and their families about basic hygiene, "a matter of critical importance in an area of the world where gastrointestinal diseases abound and infant mortality rates are high". The third season of the show included characters created to "expose young Latin American children to both traditional and nontraditional role models". The producers created characters that demonstrated family diversity, in order to fulfill their curriculum goal of presenting more egalitarian lifestyles by modeling overcoming stereotypes, demonstrating different career options for both men and women, and exhibiting the sharing of household responsibilities. They cast performers in two different families. The first family was more traditional and consisted of a middle-aged couple named Tono, a mechanic (played by Maurico Herrara), and Alicia, a public health nurse (Alicia de Bari), who had two children. The adults in the second family were young working professionals; the wife was a veterinarian and the husband was a music teacher who worked from home. Other human characters included: Jose, a shopkeeper and his young assistant, a student named Mercedes (Xochiti Vigil): a truck driver played by Tony Diaz; and a pilot (Fernando Balzaretti), who travelled throughout Latin American and came home to tell his adventures to his friends on the plaza. As of 1990, the third season was still airing in reruns.

In 1995, a fourth season of Plaza Sésamo was produced. It featured two new monsters named Lola and Pancho, a larger cast of children, more original music, and a new set designed by renowned Mexican architect Ricardo Legorreta. The season focused on a more innovative curriculum, developed by a board of Latin American educators and UNICEF, and included topics such as health, hygiene, safety issues, cooperation, counting, and the alphabet. The producers created outreach materials for Hispanic families, for the purpose of promoting media literacy and helping parents improve their roles as their children's first teachers. The fourth season aired in the U.S. because of the large population of Spanish-speakers in the country; it was the first time an original co-production was shown in the U.S. As Gary Knell, an executive at the CTW stated, "Our mission is to educate all kids. And the fact is, in the U.S., especially in cities like Los Angeles, there's an enormous number of Spanish-speaking households".

The fourth season was test-marketed for American audiences in April on PBS and Univision stations in Miami, Dallas–Fort Worth, and Los Angeles. The test-run was successful, so PBS and Univision began airing it nationally in December; it reached 92% of the country's Spanish-speaking households. At first, Plaza Sésamo's producers were concerned that the show would be attacked, but The Los Angeles Times reported that "even some staunch opponents of bilingual education concede that Plaza Sésamo has its merits". The L.A. Times also stated that its broadcast in the U.S. was an acknowledgment that Spanish was a prominent language in the U.S. and that more children were bilingual. The show's supporters believed that exposure to an educational program like Plaza Sésamo would result in the transfer of Spanish skills to English and increase literacy in both languages. Bilingual education opponents disagreed, but were not against the show's entertainment value. According to Knell, the CTW found that watching the Spanish version did not draw children away from the English version.

In 2012, Plaza Sésamo celebrated its 40th anniversary with the creation of a new website and a traveling photo exhibit. In December 2013, the show's 15th season premiered with 52 episodes. Segments were shot throughout Latin America; it was the first time the show was filmed in Colombia. Its curriculum focused on math, literacy, diversity, and health. A stakeholders meeting was convened in Bogotá in October 2012, consisting of interested parties from government and the private sector, and included officials from UNICEF. In 2016, episodes began to debut on HBO Latino, as part of a five-year deal running from January 16, 2016 to July 11, 2020. All songs are left undubbed from English. That same year, Plaza Sésamo (alongside its Brazilian counterpart Vila Sésamo) shortened its name to simply Sésamo and fully moved to Colombia. Three seasons have been produced as of December 2017, with a total of 65 episodes. A fourth season, made exclusively for Azteca 7 debuted on April 27, 2020. The season mostly features dubbed segments from Season 50 of its American counterpart.

== Influence ==
When Plaza Sésamo's first season premiered, it was the highest rated TV program ever broadcast in Mexico. The UPI reported that all three seasons of the show had some of the highest ratings in Mexico; its second season, which premiered in 1975, "had piled on ratings that only Mexico's popular soap operas could rival". Gettas claimed that Plaza Sésamo was "the model for all subsequent Sesame Street co-productions throughout the world". He also stated that the first season "had a demonstrable impact on the educational achievement levels of its young audience". In 1974, a study was conducted by American and Mexican researchers that studied the effect of Plaza Sésamo on its viewers. Highly significant differences were found in tests about general knowledge, letters, and numbers after children were exposed to the show. Significant gains were made in several cognitive and perceptual areas by regular viewers, even in subjects that were not taught by the show.

Seasons 1 to onwards from Sesame Street were dubbed into Mexican (Latin American) Spanish.

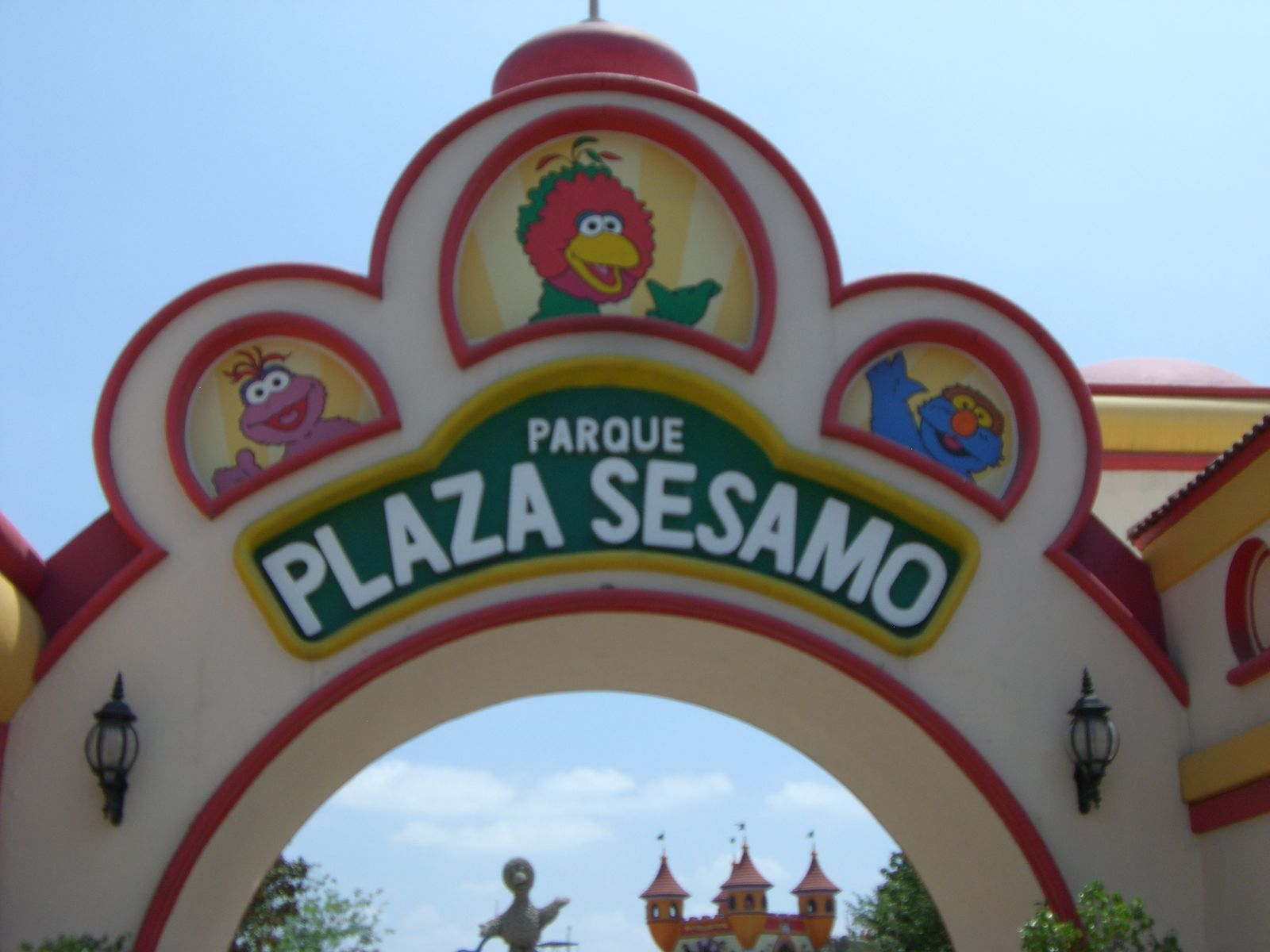
The front gate to Parque Plaza Sesamo

In 1995, Parque Plaza Sésamo, a 12-acre theme park based on the show, was opened in Monterrey, Mexico, within the gates of the theme park Parque Fundidora. It is the first theme park of its kind in Mexico. According to a press release announcing its opening, Parque Plaza Sésamo includes water rides, live entertainment, interactive, and educational elements. It is privately owned, with Mexican investments, and features the show's characters, along with the American Sesame Street, via a licensing agreement with Sesame Workshop. The park's focus audience is around northern Mexico and South Texas. On May 18, 2022, the park announced that it would rebrand as Parque Fiesta Aventuras for the 2022 season following a two-year period of closure. The reason for the rebranding was not classified by the park, but is likely that the park terminated its license to use the Plaza Sésamo branding and characters.

In 2003, the Pan American Health Organization (PAHO) and the Sesame Workshop collaborated in a program promoting vaccinations. Their promotion reached over 147 million children and adults. In 2007, the Workshop participated in an extensive health promotion in Mexico; they put many of the characters of Plaza Sésamo on milk containers, which were given to schools, with positive messages about nutrition and exercise. Studies showed that the promotion was effective. Children choose healthy food associated with the show's characters, and 68 percent of families exposed to the promotion reported positive changes in their children's nutrition and hygiene habits. In 2009, the Workshop was awarded the "Champion of Health" award by PAHO for its efforts. In response to a flu pandemic in Mexico, various national celebrities appeared in public service announcements with the Plaza Muppets, discussing flu prevention.

== Appearances ==
=== Television ===
- 1997; 2017; 2020: "Sesame Street" (with Abelardo Montoya as Big Bird's cousin)
- 2002: "The 76th Annual Macy's Thanksgiving Day Parade" (with Abelardo Montoya and Lola) (November 28)
- 2011-13: Sesame Street Road Safety Campaign (with Pancho)
- 2013-17: "¡Despierta América!"; "Dream, Save, Do" (with Bel and Lola)

=== Events ===
- 2003: Sesame Workshop's Annual Benefit Gala (June 4)
- 2019: Sesame Street: Road Trip with Abelardo Montoya as Big Bird's cousin as he travels from Mexico to Los Angeles, for material taped for season 50.)

=== Comic Books ===
- 2013: "Sesame Street": (Issue #1, with Bodoque)

== International broadcasting ==
Country/Region	Channel
Mexico	Las Estrellas; Canal 5 Azteca 7 Discovery Kids; Max
Venezuela	Venevisión; Televen; TVes; Discovery Kids; HBO Max
Argentina	Discovery Kids; Telefé; Televisión Pública Argentina; El Nueve; HBO Max
Colombia	Canal RCN; Señal Colombia; Teleantioquia; Canal Uno; Telepacífico; Telecaribe; Discovery Kids; HBO Max
Ecuador	Ecuavisa; Discovery Kids; HBO Max
Peru	Red Televisión; TV Peru; Discovery Kids; HBO Max
United States	Univision; Discovery Kids; PBS Kids (Western and Southern United States); UniMás; Sprout on Demand; V-Me; Max
Chile	Chilevisión; Mega; Telecanal; La Red; Discovery Kids; HBO Max
El Salvador	Discovery Kids; Canal 10 (TVES); Canal 12; HBO Max
Uruguay	Channel 4, Uruguay; Discovery Kids; HBO Max
Guatemala	Televisiete; Trecevisión; Discovery Kids; HBO Max
Paraguay	Telefuturo; SNT; Paravisión; LaTele; Red Guaraní; Discovery Kids; HBO Max
Cuba	Cubavisión; Discovery Kids
Puerto Rico	Telemundo; Discovery Kids; PBS Kids; HBO Max
Costa Rica	Teletica; Repretel; Discovery Kids; HBO Max
Dominican Republic	Telesistema Canal 11; Discovery Kids; HBO Max
Honduras	Canal 5 El Líder; Discovery Kids; HBO Max
Panama	RPC TV Canal 4 Discovery Kids; HBO Max
Nicaragua	Canal 9 Telenica Canal 8 Discovery Kids; HBO Max
Bolivia	Bolivisión; Discovery Kids; HBO Max
Brazil	TV Cultura; Rede Globo; TV Ra-Tim-Bum

== Dubbing ==
Country	Business dubbing	Language
Mexico	CINSA (1972-1983); Sonomex (1983-2003); Art Sound México (2003-2005); AF Dubbing House (2005-2009); Candiani Dubbing Studios (2009–present)	Spanish
Brazil	Audio News (2003-2006); Herbert Richers (2007-2014); Centro Comunicaciones (2015-2019); Tempo Filmes (2020-present)	Portuguese
