= Television in Mexico =

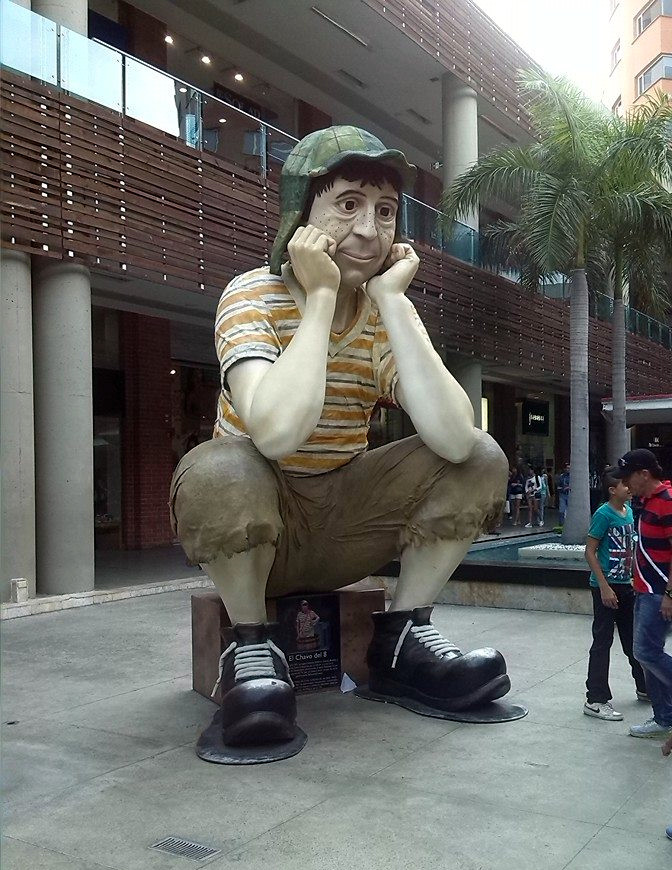
A statue of El Chavo, the lead character of the eponymous 1973 sitcom starring comedian Chespirito. Reruns of El Chavo have remained popular in syndication across Mexico and the Americas.

Television is a popular form of entertainment in Mexico, with mass entertainment playing an important role in creating a national unified culture. Telenovelas are very traditional in Mexico, translated into many languages, and watched all over the world with famous names like Lucero, Thalía, Verónica Castro, Itati, Leticia Calderón and Victoria Ruffo.

== Network television ==
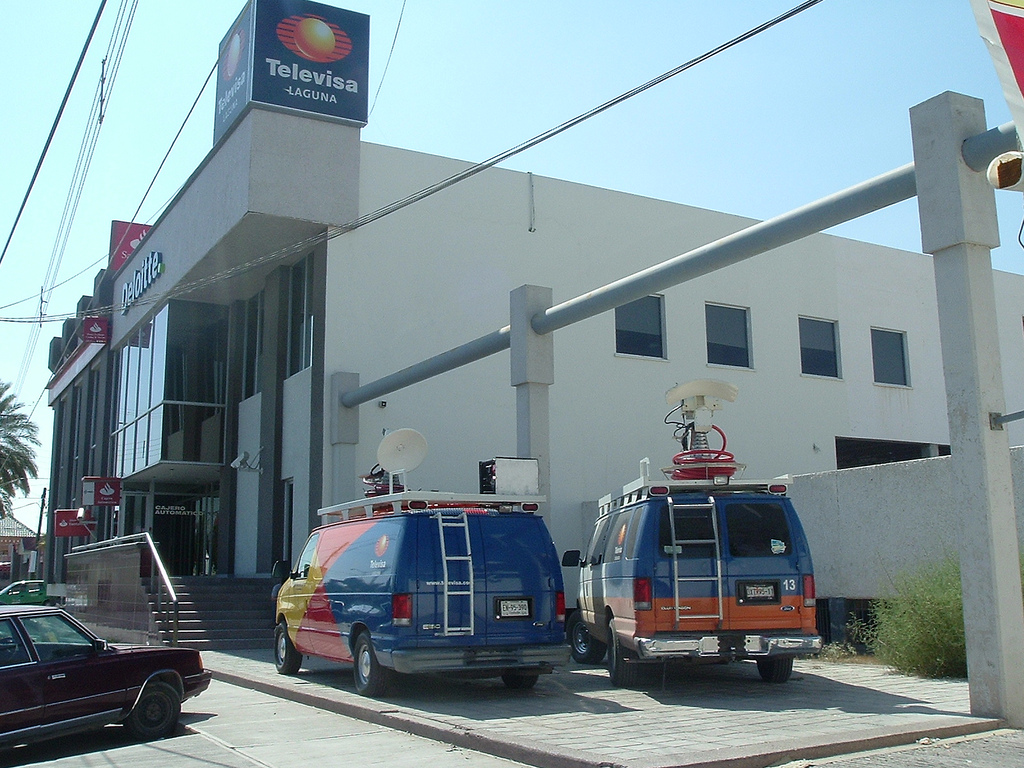
Televisa facilities in Torreón, Coahuila

Three major television companies in Mexico own the primary networks and broadcasts covering all nation, Televisa, TV Azteca and Imagen Television. Televisa is also the largest producer of Spanish-language content in the world and also the world's largest Spanish-language media network. Media company Grupo Imagen is another national coverage television broadcaster in Mexico, that also owns the newspaper Excélsior. Grupo Multimedios is another media conglomerate with Spanish-language broadcasting in Mexico, Costa Rica and the United States.

Televisa owns the Las Estrellas and Canal 5 networks, while TV Azteca owns the Azteca 7 and Azteca Uno networks.

There are also several other commercial networks with less than 75% national reach. Chief among these are Televisa's NU9VE, which in some areas shares time with regional programming, and Multimedios Televisión, which broadcasts mostly in northeastern Mexico.

Noncommercially, Canal Once operated by the Instituto Politécnico Nacional is the oldest educational television service in Latin America. The Sistema Público de Radiodifusión del Estado Mexicano (SPR) operates a network of digital retransmitters which offer multiple public television stations, including Canal 22, teveunam, Ingenio TV and its own Canal Catorce. As SPR's national transmitter network complements that of Canal Once, almost all of its stations also retransmit that network.

== Television genres ==
=== Telenovelas ===
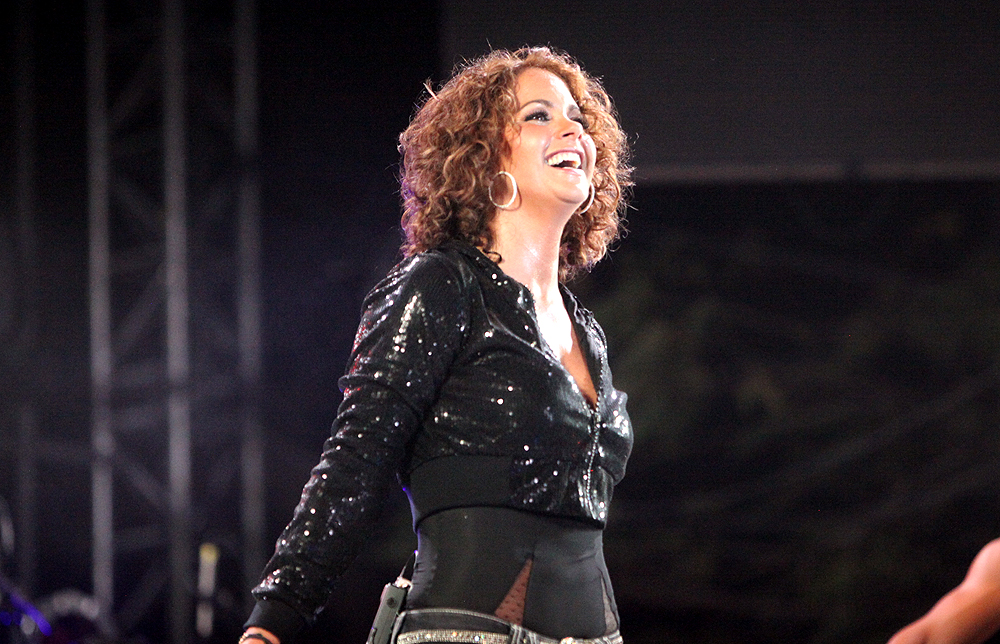
Lucero recognized by People en Español as the "Queen of the Telenovelas" celebrated on the 2013 issue of "Los 50 mas Bellos". Lucero has won more TVyNovelas Awards than any other actress.

Mexico is one of the first countries in the world to be known for producing telenovelas aimed at shaping national social behavior – one issue of which is on family planning during the 1970s. The Mexican model of telenovelas (soap opera) – then to be replicated by other telenovela-producing countries in Latin America and Asia for most of the 1990s – usually involves a romantic couple that encounters many problems throughout the show's run, a villain and usually ends with a wedding. One common ending archetype, consists of a wedding, and with the villain dying, going to jail, becoming permanently injured or disabled, or losing his/her mind. The use of sexually themed episodes starring the leading couple of the story has been a common element through most Mexican (and even Latin American) telenovelas. Senda prohibida was the first telenovela produced in Mexico. It was produced by Telesistema Mexicano and broadcast June 12, 1958, from Monday to Friday.

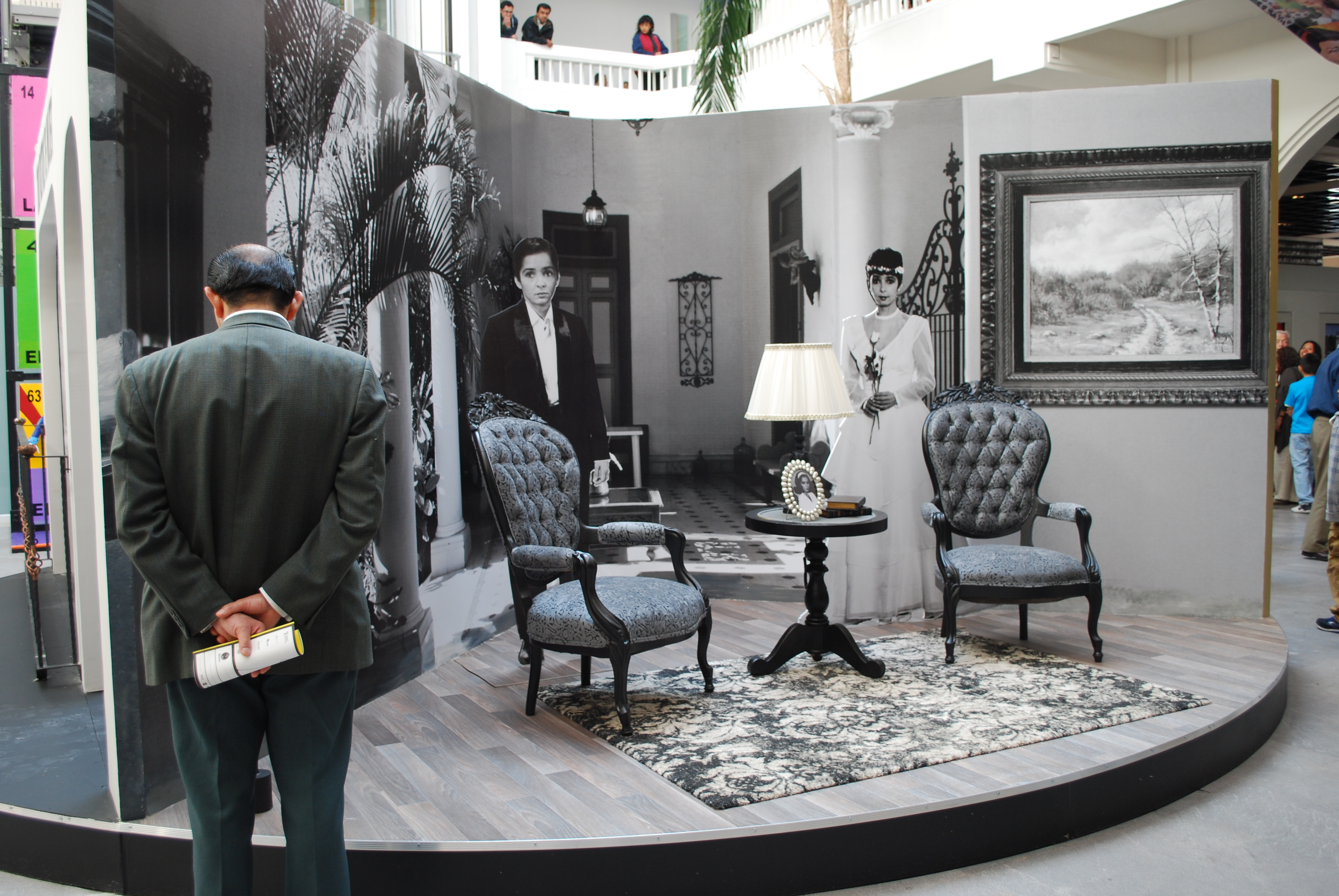
Museum display, homage to writer Yolanda Vargas Dulché at the Museo de Arte Popular in Mexico City. Museum visitor looks at a mock set representing the telenovela Gabriel y Gabriela.

Televisa and TV Azteca are the largest producers and exporters of Mexican telenovelas. Their main competitor is independent company Argos Comunicación. Telenovelas produced by U.S.-based network Telemundo tend to follow the Mexican model. Previously, telenovelas were often thought to be used as a government tool to distract citizens from national issues, a reason cited for temporary decrease in their credibility and popular appeal. Nowadays, Mexican television has managed to counteract government influence in its telenovelas. In particular, around 1990, Televisa found an enormous market for its telenovelas in other parts of Latin America, post-Cold War Eastern Europe and Asia. This precipitated the so-called 'Telenovela Craze'. Credited by media experts especially to Televisa's move in the early 1990s of exporting its telenovelas to parts of the world, this rivaled the wave of American sitcoms that had been broadcast worldwide in the same period.

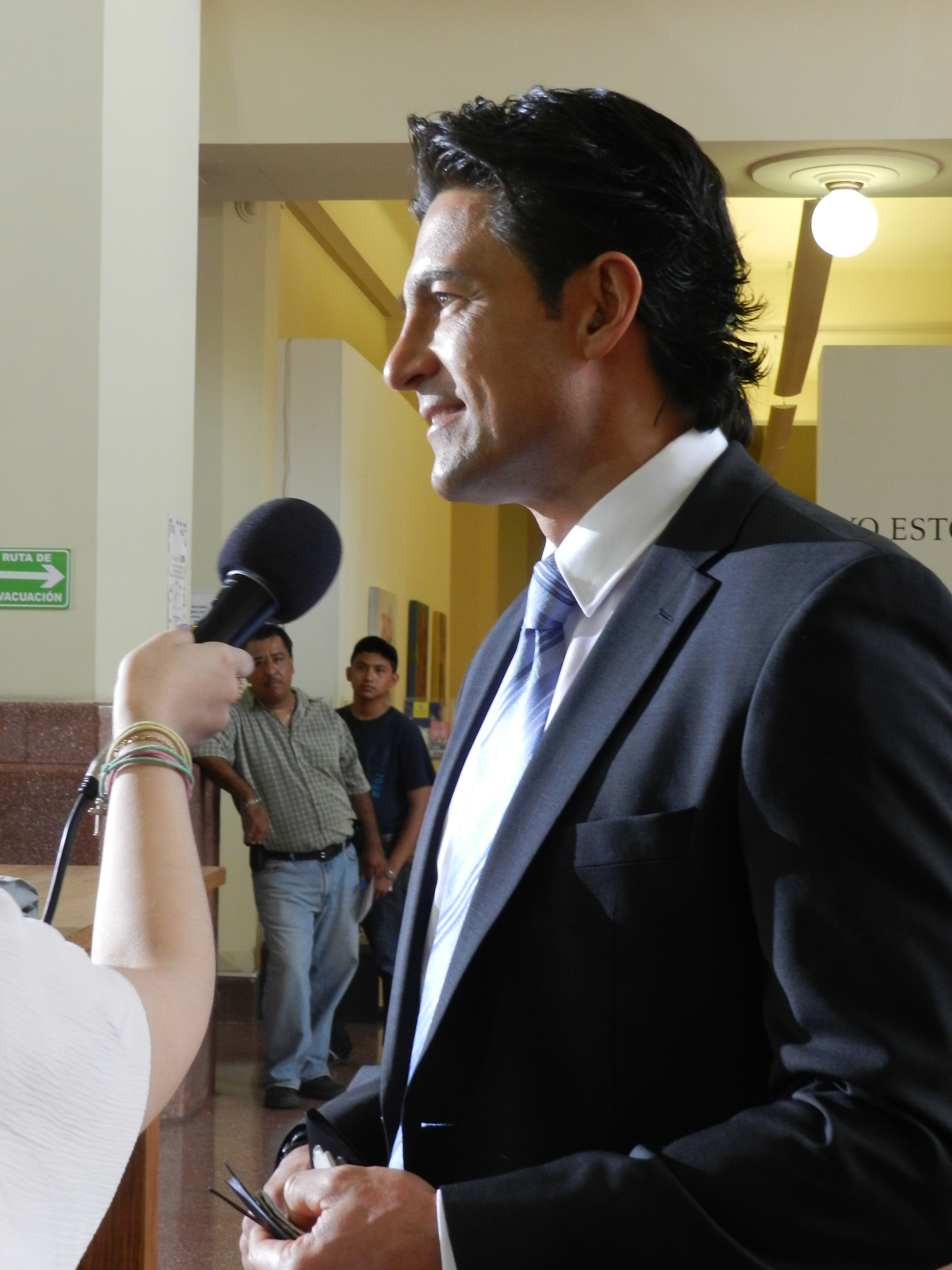
Fernando Colunga is one of the most awarded actors.

During the peak of the global success of Latin American telenovelas in the 1990s and 2000s, several prominent Mexican actors and actresses gained huge following for the telenovelas that they starred and which were viewed in the mentioned regions. For example, Verónica Castro's international fame grew when the novela she had starred in many years earlier, Los ricos también lloran in 1979, became a major hit in Russia. In the 1982 telenovela Vanessa, Lucía Méndez became the first star of a soap-opera to be killed; however, this was due to her alleged diva attitude which forced retaliation from the writers and producers to "kill Vanessa off", later she stated that she was sick with pneumonia and that's the reason why she couldn't shoot the last scenes. In the same period, Thalía earned the title as the 90's "Queen of Soap Operas" after starring in the so-called Las Tres Marias or the "Maria Trilogy" telenovelas – Maria Mercedes, Marimar and María la del Barrio – and Rosalinda, converting her into one of the world's foremost television icons, as her telenovelas were broadcast in Mexico and more than 180 other countries to almost 2 billion viewers worldwide, earning the all-time highest television ratings both in Mexico and other regions.

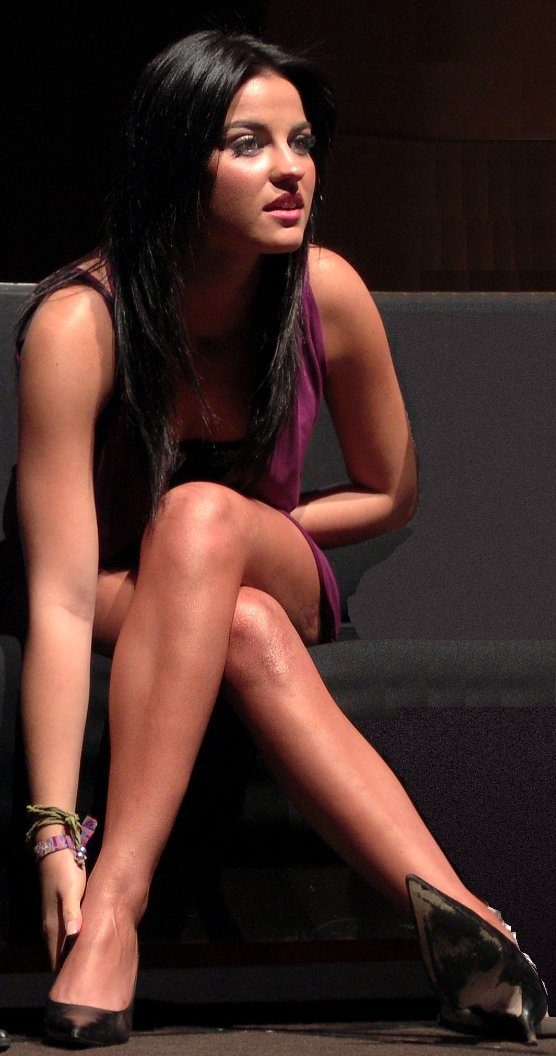
Maite Perroni has starred in numerous television series'. She gained acclaim in 2009 when she was named "The New Queen of Telenovelas" by Univision.

Due to the international success of the telenovelas broadcast in and out of Mexico, by the late 1990s, the company claimed that telenovelas were Mexico's leading export product. Many consider the period from 1958 to 2004 to be Televisa's Golden Age of telenovelas, at the same time when the Mexican government loosened its control over television. Telenovelas, primarily those produced by Argos Comunicación, consequently addressed new themes, including poverty, political corruption, immigration and drug smuggling. However, with American drama and comedy series becoming increasingly popular among Mexican audiences through cable or satellite television and unlicensed copying, the television companies opted to adapt stories from Argentina, Colombia and Brazil. These used veteran actors in order to decrease expenses.

On November 21, 2016, Televisa released a telenovela titled La candidata (The Candidate) protagonized by actress Silvia Navarro as Regina Bárcenas (whom acts as the speculated fictional stand-in for Margarita Zavala) and Rafael Sánchez Navarro as her husband Alonso San Roman (which acts as the speculated fictional stand-in for Felipe Calderón). It is heavily speculated this television program, was created in order to favor Zavala in the 2018 elections against MORENA's political candidate Andrés Manuel López Obrador whom Televisa did not want as president due to his leftist political points of view.

=== Television sitcoms ===
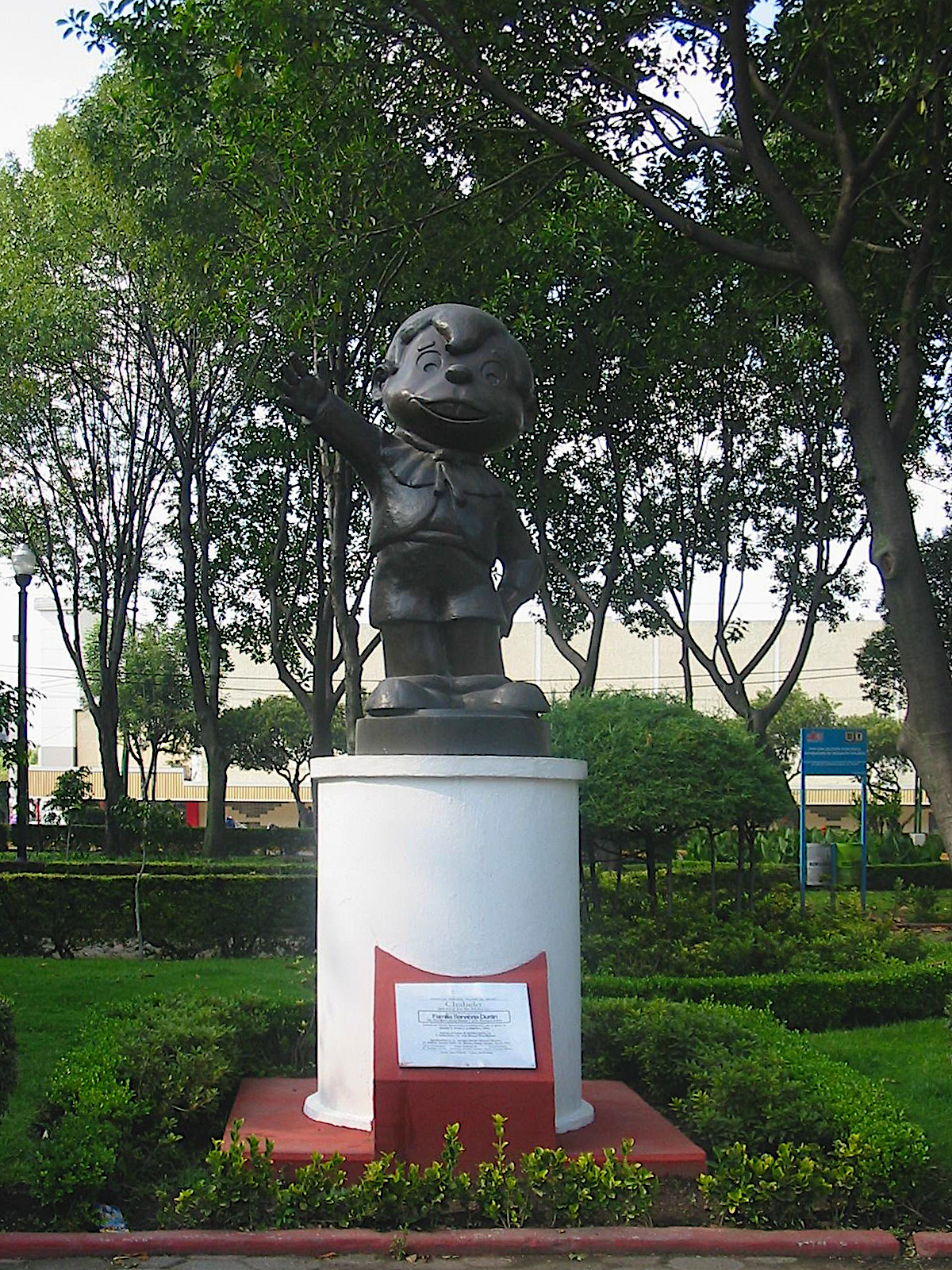
Statue in honor of Chabelo located in the "Jardin de los Grandes Valores" (Garden of Great Values) in Mexico City. It is a caricatured representation of his character in the program En Familia con Chabelo (In Family with Chabelo).

El Chavo del 8 was a Mexican comic television series created by and starring Chespirito. The program deals with the experiences of a group of people who live in a Mexican neighborhood where its protagonist, is a poor orphan nicknamed "El Chavo" (which means "The Kid"). At its peak of popularity during the mid-1970s, it had a Latin American audience of over 350 million viewers per episode. El Chapulín Colorado ('The Red Grasshopper' or as Captain Hopper in the English version of the animated series) was also a Mexican television comedy series that ran from 1973 to 1979 and parodied superhero shows. It was first aired by Televisa in 1973 in Mexico, and then was aired across Latin America and Spain until 1981, alongside El Chavo, which shared the same cast of actors. Jorge Ortiz de Pinedo worked in various successful television series, the most successful of which have been Dr. Cándido Pérez, Cero en conducta, and its sequel, La escuelita VIP, and lastly Una familia de diez. Ortiz de Pinedo was featured in the 2007 book Televisa presenta (presents), which takes a look back at 50 years of network television in Mexico. He has worked as Mexican producer, director, writer, comedian and actor. Modern show include La familia P. Luche it features a dysfunctional family living in a city with a lot of plush fabric with plenty of terms related to family drama and general everyday life and Vecinos the series portrays the life of everyday people in Mexican barrios, where anything can be found — the jealous housewife, the spinster, the strange family, etc. Each episode features the interactions between these peculiar neighbors, where they deal with problems both real and imagined, such as ghosts, treasures, ripoffs, fights, etc.. Contemporary shows consist of Lorenza starring Bárbara Torres a flight attendant of obsessive character, Mi querida herencia (My Dear Inheritance) Carlos Fernández de León is a partying and irresponsible man who lives off his father's money. When he dies, his father decides to leave his fortune to Carlos, with one condition: he must get married. Lastly 40 and 20 divorced father and teenage son respectively, live all kinds of entanglements and nonsense within the typical coexistence of a family divorced and dysfunctional. La India María a fictional character portrayed and created by actress María Elena Velasco has appeared in cameo appearances in the television programs Mujer, casos de la vida real and La familia P. Luche. She has represented the poor indigenous, the migrant worker, and even free-spirited nuns for over 30 years. She has been the lead character in 16 films and in a spin-off television series entitled Ay María qué puntería.

=== Political satire ===
Several Mexican broadcast television programs since the 1990s have engaged in political satire. According to critics, both the potentials and the pitfalls of Mexican television satire may be exemplified by El Privilegio de Mandar, a political comedy telenovela accused of being biased in favor of the governing party's candidate in the context of the 2006 Mexican general election, and by Víctor Trujillo, a comedian and news host famous for his black humor and for his attacks on politicians.

== History ==
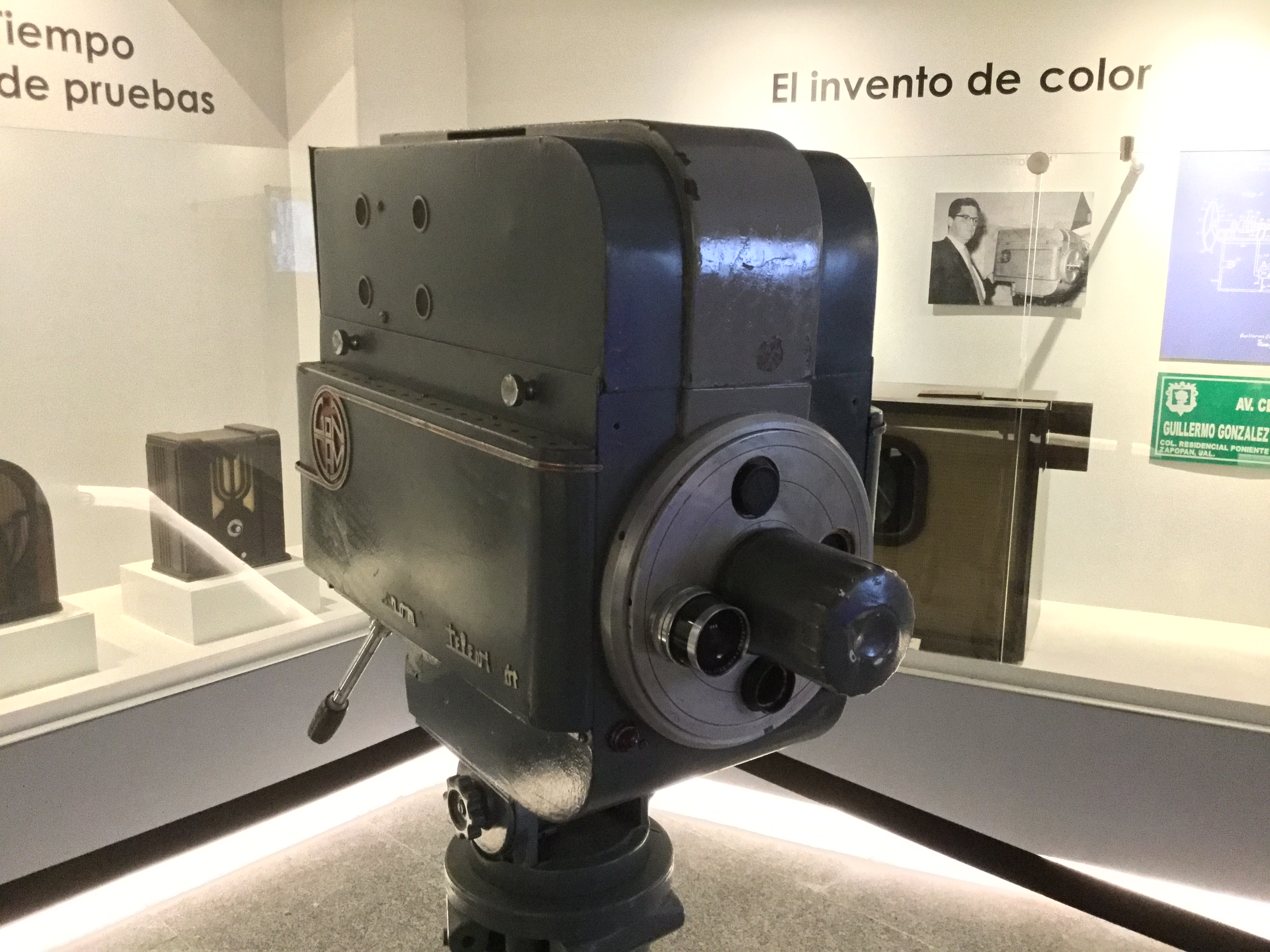
GonCam Camera of Guillermo González Camarena for Chromoscopic adapter for television equipment, pioneer color system for broadcasting. Radio and TV Museum, Palacio de la Cultura y la Comunicación, Zapopan, Jalisco.

Television in Mexico first began on August 19, 1946, in Mexico City when Guillermo González Camarena transmitted the first television signal in Latin America from the bathroom of his home. On September 7, 1946, at 8:30 PM (CST) Mexico's and Latin America's first experimental television station was established and was given the XE1GC callsign. This experimental station broadcast an artistic program and interviews on Saturdays for two years.

Mexico's first commercial station, XHTV channel 4 in Mexico City, signed on August 31, 1950, making Mexico the first Spanish-speaking country to introduce television. It started transmitting regular programs on the following day. The first program to be broadcast was President Miguel Alemán Valdés IV Informe de Gobierno. Within a year, XEW-TV channel 2, owned by the Azcárraga family, was formed. Mexico's first color television transmission was carried out by the third television station in the capital, González Camarena's XHGC Canal 5. In 1955, all three stations formed an alliance, Telesistema Mexicano (TSM), the predecessor to Televisa. In 1959, XEIPN-TV channel 11 signed on, the base of today's Canal Once network and the first educational television station in Latin America.

=== Broadcast expansion ===
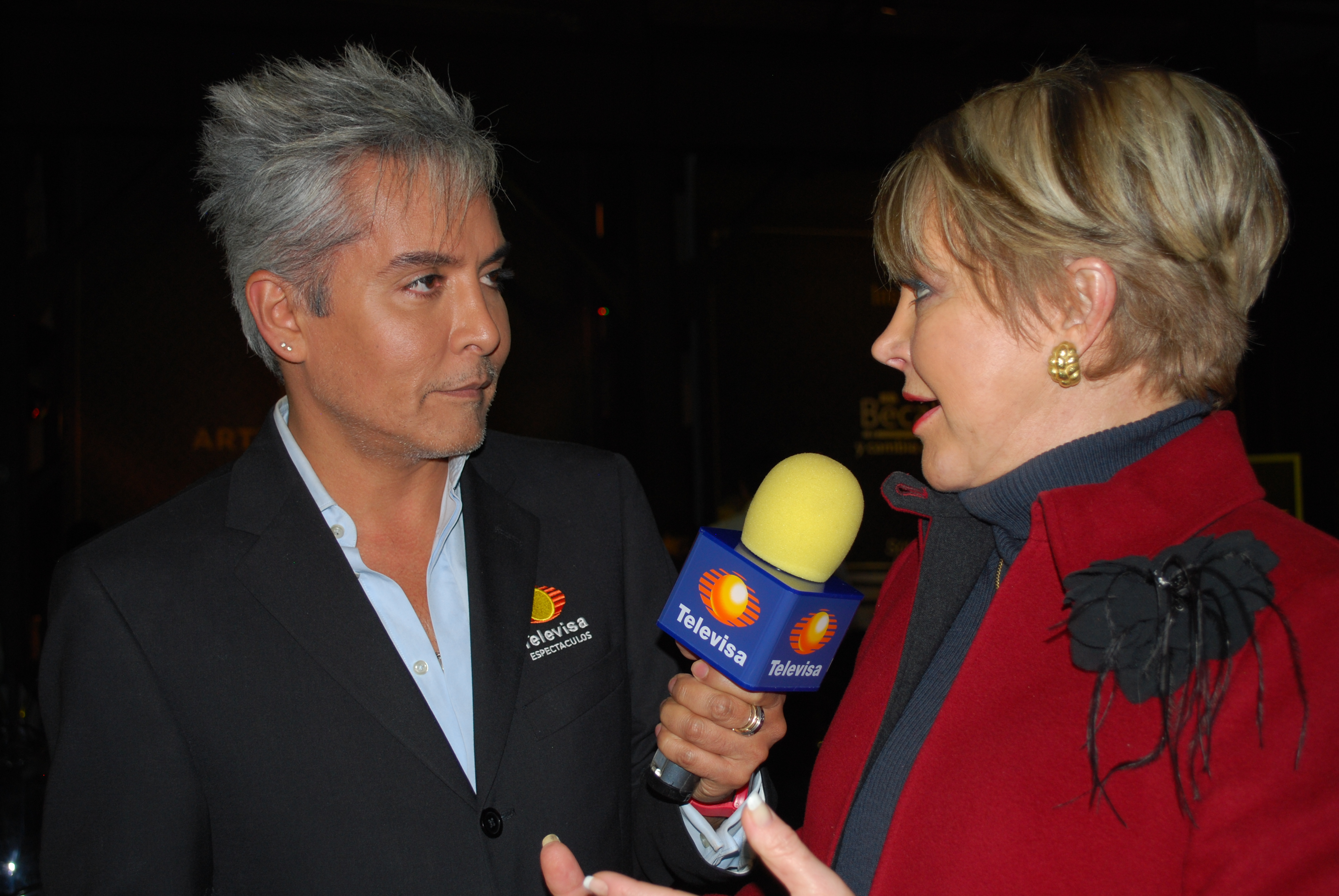
Interview with Lolita Ayala at the charity auction "Arte en Barricas" (Art in Barricas) sponsored by Tequila Herradura in Mexico City

With the exception of the short-lived but popular Televisión Independiente de México (1968–72), which TSM absorbed in 1973 to form Televisa, the latter saw no major commercial competition until 1993. Instead, the 1970s, 1980s and early 1990s were marked by a large expansion in state-owned television. This took flight in 1972 when the government, through financier SOMEX, expropriated XHDF-TV in Mexico City and used it to form the base of a Canal 13 national network with repeaters across the country. At the same time, a project known as Televisión Rural de México (later Televisión de la República Mexicana) sought to bring culture and information to rural Mexican audiences. In the 1980s, XHTRM-TV channel 22, the first UHF television station in the Valle de México, came to air bringing TRM programming to the nation's capital. In 1985, TRM was dismantled, and with the sign-on of XHIMT-TV channel 7 in Mexico City, the TRM repeaters were linked to that station, which became the flagship of the Red Nacional 7 of Imevisión. In 1993, Imevisión's privatization gave birth to Televisión Azteca.

This time period also saw the development of the first television networks run by state governments, including TVMÁS in Veracruz and TeleMichoacán. 25 of Mexico's 32 federal entities currently boast state networks.

=== Cable television ===
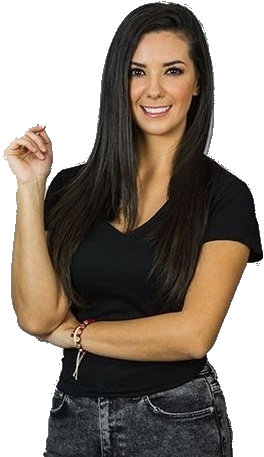
In 2021 at the 42nd Sports Emmy Awards, Pilar Pérez won the Sports Emmy Award for Outstanding On-Air Personality in Spanish for her work with ESPN Deportes.

The first cable system started to operate in the early 1960s in Monterrey, as a CATV service (an antenna at the top of the Loma Larga, which could get TV signals from Laredo, Texas and the Rio Grande Valley). Most of the other major cities didn't develop cable systems until the late 1980s, due to government censorship. By 1989, the industry had had a major impulse with the founding of Multivisión—a MMDS system who started to develop its own channels in Spanish—and the later development of companies such as Cablemás and Megacable.

Over the past few years, many US networks have started to develop content for the Latin American market, such as CNN en Español, MTV, Cartoon Network, Disney Channel, Nickelodeon, and others. The country also has a DTH service called SKY (Televisa & News Corp. owned). Recently DirecTV merged with Sky. The dominant company nowadays is Megacable and Grupo HEVI.

=== Digital television ===
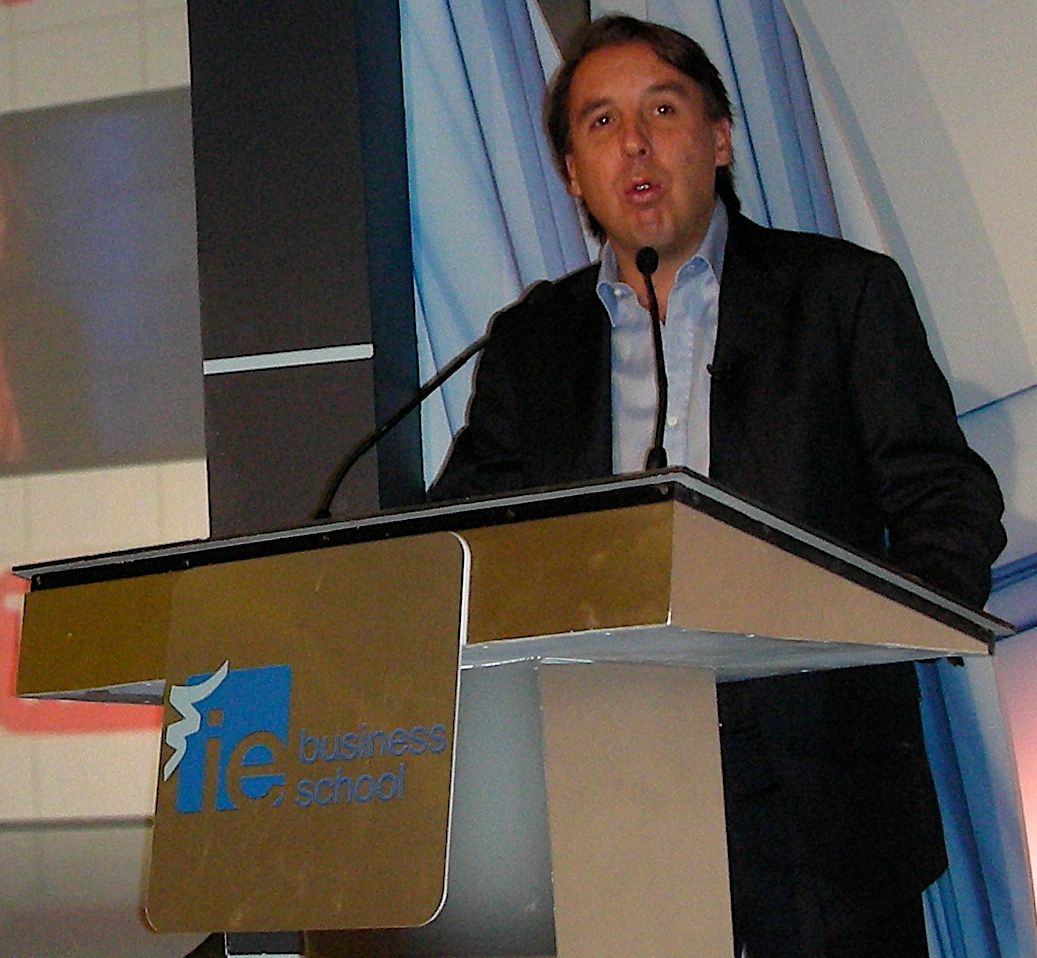
Emilio Azcárraga Jean won the 2017 International Emmy for Directorate Award

Televisa once conducted six weeks of experimental HDTV broadcasts in 1992, in collaboration with Japanese public broadcaster NHK and under the direction of Director of High Technology Projects Leonardo Ramos Mateos on the basis that Televisa would adopt the latter's MUSE analog high-definition system, branded in Japan as Hi-Vision. The Mexican broadcast conglomerate wanted to develop a dedicated pay-per-view network using the Japanese broadcast standard that would offer first-run Hollywood movies to prospective local owners of MUSE Hi-Vision equipment, which was known to cost upwards of US$30,000 at the time in Japan, as consumer equipment availability was in its infancy and low manufacturing volumes contributed to its high cost.

At this time in the nation's history, Mexico was also one of the slowest international markets to screen Hollywood films in cinemas, typically screening major releases up to 18 months after their initial premiere in the United States due to government interference and censorship. The impetus behind the test and the development of the premium pay-per-view network was for Televisa to investigate purchasing the rights to major Hollywood releases and broadcast them over the small-scale network as close to their US premiere as possible, with a variable fee depending on film.

The high cost of the home audio and video equipment, namely widescreen format televisions and audio/video receivers would have limited the service and the equipment to the wealthiest neighborhoods in Mexico City, and representatives from Televisa were quick to acknowledge this, stating that the wealthy would have been willing to purchase the equipment, not just for personal use in their homes, but as a way to form social clubs with friends and neighbors, suggesting that equipment owners and established social clubs would charge for the privilege of seeing a first-run Hollywood film and defray the costs of the equipment and film rental.

After the six-week trial ended, Televisa instead decided to end further development of the initiative, with an aborted attempt being made to involve U.S.-based electronics manufacturer Scientific Atlanta in a bid to lower equipment manufacturing and import costs. The trial ended without further development due to the unique topography and mix of building construction types in Mexico City affecting the reliability of the test signal being broadcast from a temporary broadcast site on the Pico Tres Padres mountain peak with high-rise buildings around the peak affecting reception.

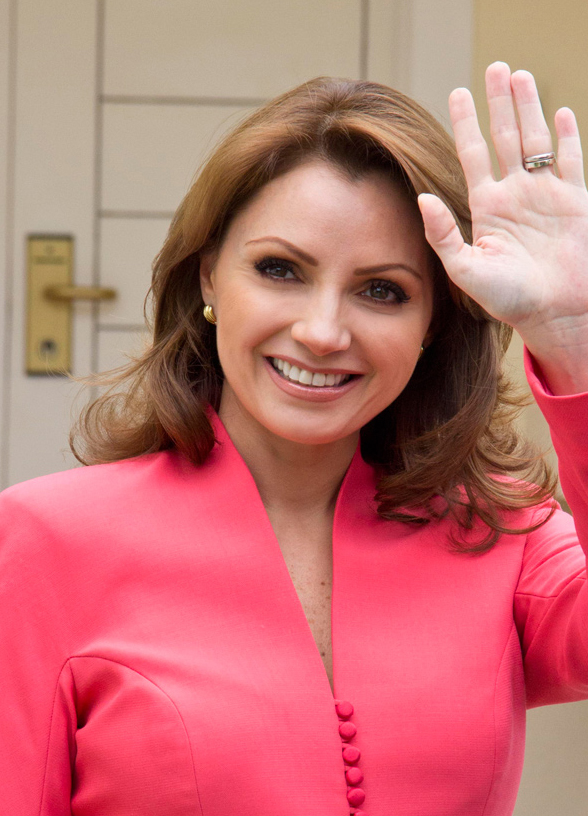
Angelica Rivera a well-known Mexican actress who has appeared in numerous telenovelas and television series. She is also known for her role as First Lady of Mexico when she was married to President Enrique Pena Nieto.

Following the aborted Japanese HDTV tests, the digital television transition that began in the early 2000s saw the Mexican government allow Televisa to test multiple digital television systems in Mexico City starting in 2002, with the broadcast conglomerate testing the US-developed ATSC, the Japanese ISDB-T and European DVB-T broadcast standards within the immediate vicinity of its San Angel production and broadcast complex for 18 months, before ultimately settling on the ATSC standard for reasons of costs and convenience officially in 2004. The decision led the Mexican government to devise several switchover plans later that year, none of which held firm as the Mexican government sought to end analog television broadcasts by December 31, 2016. In major markets, particularly in central Mexico and along the US border, digital television stations began on air broadcasts as soon as 2006. A revised plan in 2013 saw a change to switching off analog television markets separately until a national analog shutoff date was set for December 31, 2015. The first market to meet the conditions of the 90% digital coverage requirement was Tijuana. After a one-month delay to ensure that digital television coverage had crossed the 90% threshold, analog signals were turned off on May 28. However, the Mexican government agency in charge of broadcast networks in Cofetel at the time allowed the Tijuana-area stations to resume analog broadcasting just a few days after ending analog broadcasts over concerns that the digital switchover would have a negative impact in the lead up to state elections on July 7; the digital television switchover was made permanent two weeks later on July 18.

Delays in the digital television switchover continued due to legal concerns and the telecommunications reform of 2013–14 enacted by President Enrique Peña Nieto required entirely new legislation in the sector and created the new Federal Telecommunications Institute as a result. However, the digital television switchover resumed in 2015 when Reynosa/Matamoros and Nuevo Laredo switched off analog broadcasts on January 13, the first of ten dates that year in which stations in various regions of the country shut off analog television transmission. By December 31, all high-power stations had shut off analog broadcasts, with some 500 low-power analog stations remaining in service for an additional year due to the financial difficulties encountered by public broadcasters in transitioning to digital broadcasting and the continued existence of analog repeater stations unprepared for digital television broadcasts.

== Cable channels ==
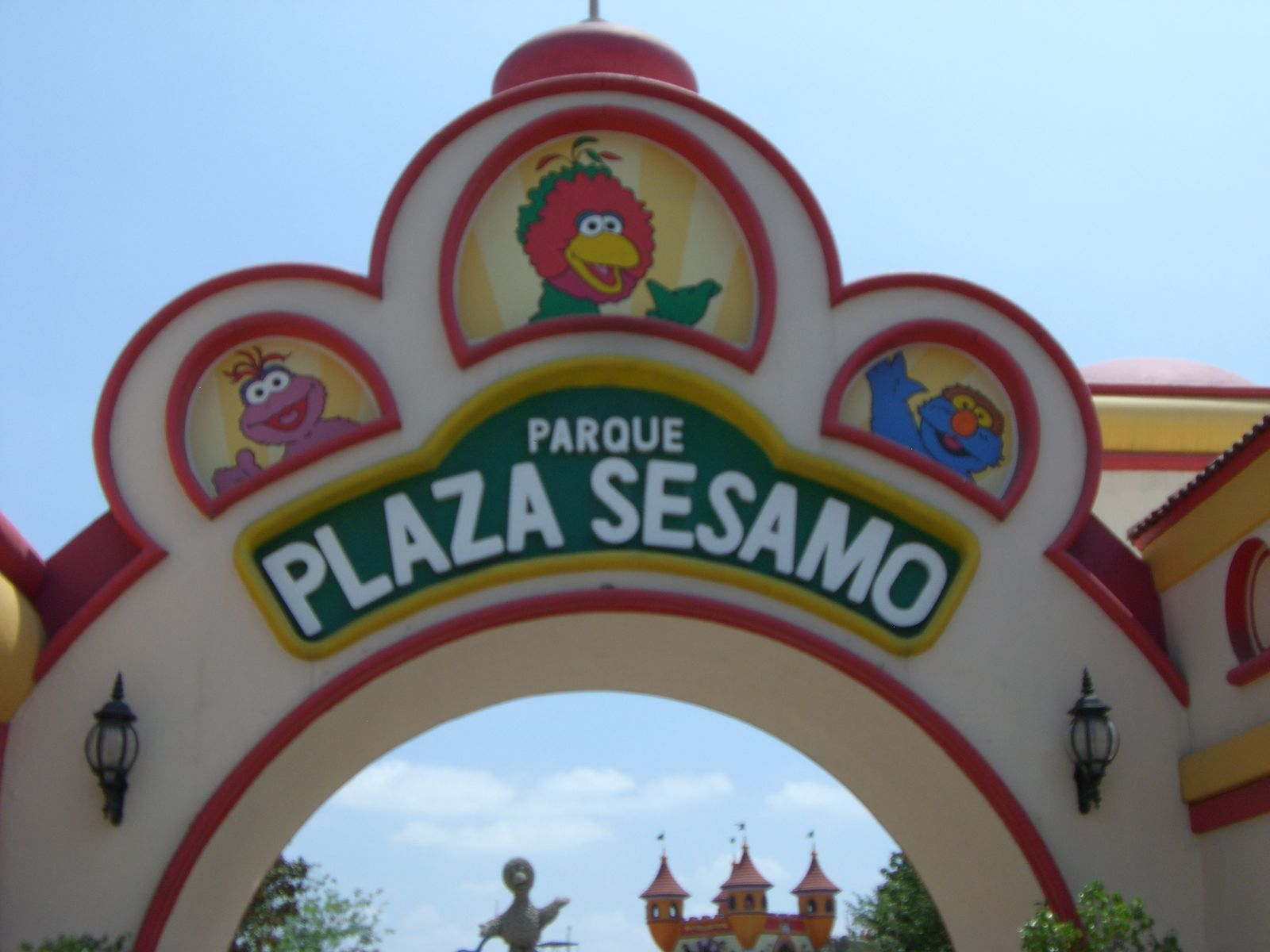
Plaza Sésamo, an international co-production of the American children's television program Sesame Street

- Tiin – Airs children's and teens' series and movies.
- De Película – Mexican cinema from the Golden Era. Available in Mexico, Latin America, United States, Europe, Australia and New Zealand.
- TeleHit – Hit Music Network. Mexico and U.S.
- Tlnovelas – Televisa's most famous soap operas. Pan American, European and Australian Versions.
- Unicable – Univision and low-cost productions.
- TVC – Magazine Network. Available in all Mexican states except DF. Produced by major cable-system operator PCTV.
- Platino – B-Movies.

== Most viewed channels ==
Position	Channel	Share of total viewing (%)
1	Las Estrellas	14.1
2	Azteca 7	12.8
3	Canal 5	8.1
4	Azteca Uno	5.6
5	Imagen Televisión	2.5
6	Nu9ve	2.1
7	ADN 40	1.9
8	Canal 6	1.6
9	FOROtv	1.2
10	a+	1.0

== See also ==
- Televisa
- Televisión Azteca
- Imagen Televisión
- Jacobo Zabludovsky
- Javier Alatorre
- Joaquín López Dóriga
- Carlos Loret de Mola
- Ciro Gómez Leyva
- Chespirito
- Eugenio Derbez
- List of television stations in Mexico
- List of television networks in Mexico
