= List of 1969 box office number-one films in the United States =

This is a list of films which placed number one at the weekly box office in the United States during 1969.

== Number-one films ==
†	This implies the highest-grossing movie of the year.

#	Week ending	Film	Gross	Notes	Ref
1	January 1, 1969	Candy	$555,000		
2	January 8, 1969	Candy	TBD		
3	January 15, 1969	Bullitt	$415,000	Number one in fifth week of release	
4	January 22, 1969	Bullitt	TBD		
5	January 29, 1969	Funny Girl †	TBD	Funny Girl returned to number one in its 19th week of release	
6	February 5, 1969	Funny Girl †	TBD		
7	February 12, 1969	Funny Girl †	TBD		
8	February 19, 1969	Funny Girl †	TBD		
9	February 26, 1969	Funny Girl †	TBD		
10	March 5, 1969	Funny Girl †	TBD		
11	March 12, 1969	Funny Girl †	TBD		
12	March 19, 1969	Funny Girl †	TBD		
13	March 26, 1969	Funny Girl †	TBD		
14	April 2, 1969	The Love Bug	TBD		
15	April 9, 1969	The Love Bug	$497,750		
16	April 16, 1969	The Love Bug	$551,958	Number one per Variety's first published computerized boxoffice chart.	
17	April 23, 1969	Support Your Local Sheriff!	$572,100		
18	April 30, 1969	Support Your Local Sheriff!	$389,820		
19	May 7, 1969	99 Women	$311,778		
20	May 14, 1969	The Mad Room	$283,500		
21	May 21, 1969	Oliver!	$271,955	The chart for the week ending May 28 listed 100 Rifles as the number one film for the last week (week ending May 21) with a gross of $340,500. The last week grosses for the other films were not in line with that published previously and the grosses for this last week were added to the totals for the week ending May 28 indicating that there had been an earlier error with the dates for the charts published earlier	
22	May 28, 1969	Winning	$309,500	Winning reached number one in its second week of release	
23	June 4, 1969	The Killing of Sister George	$628,500		
24	June 11, 1969	The Longest Day	$501,259		
25	June 18, 1969	Winning	$413,600	Winning returned to number one in its fifth week of release	
26	June 25, 1969	Ice Station Zebra	$476,500		
27	July 2, 1969	The Love Bug	$633,200		
28	July 9, 1969	The Love Bug	$724,000		
29	July 16, 1969	The Love Bug	$658,300		
30	July 23, 1969	The April Fools	$587,100	The April Fools reached number one in its eighth week of release	
31	July 30, 1969	What Ever Happened to Aunt Alice?	$540,000		
32	August 6, 1969	Midnight Cowboy	$550,237	Midnight Cowboy reached number one in its tenth week of release	
33	August 13, 1969	Goodbye, Columbus	$935,500	Goodbye, Columbus reached number one in its twentieth week of release	
34	August 20, 1969	Goodbye, Columbus	$681,200		
35	August 27, 1969	True Grit	$560,000	True Grit reached number one in its eleventh week of release	
36	September 3, 1969	Goodbye, Columbus	$522,100	Goodbye, Columbus returned to number one in its 23rd week of release	
37	September 10, 1969	Daddy's Gone-A-Hunting	$545,700		
38	September 17, 1969	True Grit	$531,500	True Grit returned to number one in its fourteenth week of release	
39	September 24, 1969	The Learning Tree	$401,120	The Learning Tree reached number one in its seventh week of release	
40	October 1, 1969	Bonnie and Clyde/Bullitt (double-bill)	$546,163	The Bonnie and Clyde and Bullitt double-bill reached number one in its fifth week of release	
41	October 8, 1969	Butch Cassidy and the Sundance Kid	$500,608	Butch Cassidy and the Sundance Kid reached number one in its second week of release	
42	October 15, 1969	Butch Cassidy and the Sundance Kid	$501,000		
43	October 22, 1969	Easy Rider	$496,644	Easy Rider reached number one in fourteenth week of release	
44	October 29, 1969	Easy Rider	$410,211		
45	November 5, 1969	Easy Rider	$319,317		
46	November 12, 1969	Fanny Hill	$625,000	Fanny Hill reached number one in seventh week of release	
47	November 19, 1969	I Am Curious (Yellow)	$594,509	I Am Curious (Yellow) reached number one in its 36th week of the chart	
48	November 26, 1969	I Am Curious (Yellow)	$454,441		
49	December 3, 1969	Krakatoa, East of Java	$621,800	Krakatoa, East of Java reached number one in its 29th week of release	
50	December 10, 1969	Paint Your Wagon	$276,900	Paint Your Wagon reached number one in its eighth week of release	
51	December 17, 1969	A Boy Named Charlie Brown	$290,000	A Boy Named Charlie Brown reached number one in its second week of release	
52	December 24, 1969	On Her Majesty's Secret Service	$1,223,000		
53	December 31, 1969	On Her Majesty's Secret Service	$1,370,100		

== Highest-grossing films ==
Highest-grossing films of 1969 by calendar year gross based on the cities covered by Variety for the weekly charts. (Note: Variety noted that the total grosses that they collated represented about 30% of total US grosses as defined by the US Department of Commerce.)

Rank	Title	Studio	Playing weeks (Note: Playing weeks represent one film in one theatre for one week)	Gross ($)	Rank on 1969 rental chart
1.	Funny Girl	Columbia	896	11,096,561	2
2.	Oliver!	Columbia	840	10,269,146	8
3.	Goodbye, Columbus	Paramount	739	8,216,164	8
4.	I Am Curious (Yellow)	Grove Press	792	7,903,057	12
5.	Midnight Cowboy	United Artists	472	7,346,975	7
6.	Easy Rider	Columbia	541	6,812,878	11
7.	The Lion in Winter	Avco Embassy	693	6,415,737	14
8.	Romeo and Juliet	Paramount	880	6,208,599	5
9.	Bullitt	Warner Bros.	599	5,911,826	3
10.	The Love Bug	Buena Vista	528	5,515,662	1
11.	Butch Cassidy and the Sundance Kid	20th Century Fox	454	5,056,592	4
12.	True Grit	Paramount	461	4,899,170	6
13.	2001: A Space Odyssey	MGM	392	4,058,460	N/A (Note: Listed on 1968 rental chart. Rental for 2001: A Space Odyssey increased by $6.0 million on 1969 All-Time Box Office Champs list)
14.	Charly	CRC	739	3,993,528	N/A
15.	Chitty Chitty Bang Bang	United Artists	488	3,864,963	10
16.	Alice's Restaurant	United Artists	419	3,701,847	27
17.	Krakatoa, East of Java	CRC	449	3,552,108	N/A
18.	Sweet Charity	Universal	432	3,538,617	83
19.	The Killing of Sister George	CRC	383	3,195,658	N/A
20.	The Wild Bunch	Warner Bros.	348	3,151,760	23
21.	Winning	Universal	364	3,108,248	16
22.	Where Eagles Dare	MGM	372	3,079,885	13
23.	The April Fools	National General Pictures	510	2,921,836	21
24.	Ice Station Zebra	MGM	411	2,902,104	N/A (Note: Listed on 1969 All-Time Box Office Champs list with a rental of $4,070,000.)
25.	Candy	CRC	340	2,883,927	N/A

Highest-grossing films of 1969 by rental in the United States and Canada accruing to the distributor to the end of 1969 (not total receipts as listed above for a selection of cities and includes rentals from late 1968).

Rank	Title	Studio	Director	Producer	Rental ($)
1.	The Love Bug	Buena Vista	Robert Stevenson	Bill Walsh	17,000,000
2.	Funny Girl	Columbia	William Wyler	Ray Stark	16,500,000^{*}
3.	Bullitt	Warner Bros.	Peter Yates	Philip D'Antoni	16,400,000
4.	Butch Cassidy and the Sundance Kid	20th Century Fox	George Roy Hill	John Foreman	15,000,000
5.	Romeo and Juliet	Paramount	Franco Zeffirelli	Anthony Havelock-Allan; John Brabourne	14,500,000^{*}
6.	True Grit	Paramount	Henry Hathaway	Hal Wallis	11,500,000
7.	Midnight Cowboy	United Artists	John Schlesinger	Jerome Hellman	11,000,000
8.	Oliver!	Columbia	Carol Reed	John Woolf	10,500,000^{*}
8.	Goodbye, Columbus	Paramount	Larry Peerce	Stanley R. Jaffe	10,500,000
10.	Chitty Chitty Bang Bang	United Artists	Ken Hughes	Albert R. Broccoli	7,500,000^{*}

^{*}Includes 1968 rental

== See also ==
- List of American films — American films by year
- Lists of box office number-one films

== Chronology ==
Preceded by 1968	1969	Succeeded by 1970
