= Vandamm House =

Movie setting

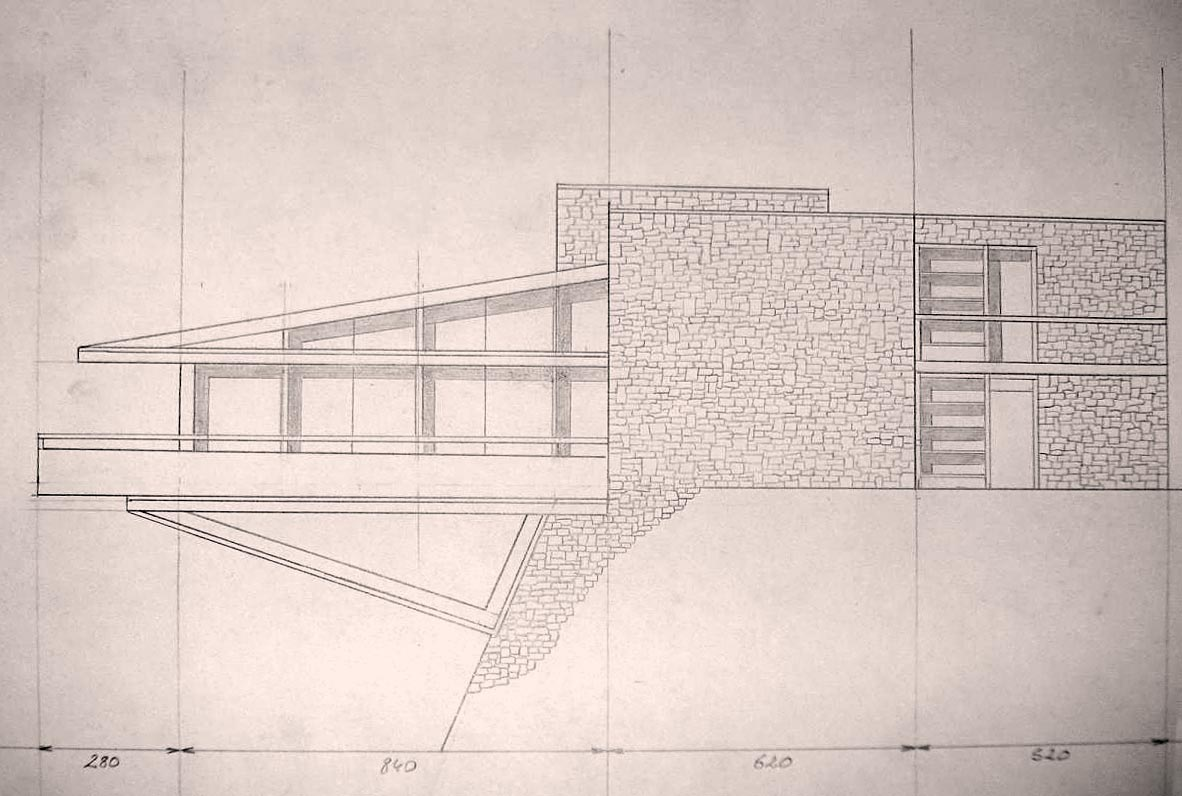

The Vandamm House is a setting in the Hitchcock movie North by Northwest. Its modern architecture was inspired by the real house Fallingwater designed by Frank Lloyd Wright. In the movie, the Vandamm House is located near Mount Rushmore, but only existed as a set constructed in an MGM studio in Culver City by Robert F. Boyle, with distant exterior shots made using a matte painting.

== Real-world replica ==
In 2026, architects John Boccardo and Michael Upwall built a full-scale replica of the Vandamm House on a ridgeline in the Pinnacle enclave of the Promontory Club, near Park City, Utah, engineering it as a permanent residence with post-tension steel and concrete foundations to support its cantilevered design. Boccardo first saw North by Northwest as a child and later learned, while studying architecture, that the house had never existed; decades later he and his partner Derek Esplin, a film producer, built the replica themselves, moving in before offering it for sale.
