= Elopement (film) =

1951 comedy film directed by Henry Koster

- Theatrical release poster
- Directed by: Henry Koster
- Written by: Bess Taffel
- Produced by: Fred Kohlmar
- Starring: Clifton Webb; Anne Francis; Charles Bickford
- Cinematography: Joseph LaShelle
- Edited by: William B. Murphy
- Music by: Cyril Mockridge; Alfred Newman (uncredited)
- Production company: Twentieth Century-Fox
- Distributed by: Twentieth Century-Fox
- Release date: November 19, 1951
- Running time: 82 minutes
- Country: United States
- Language: English
- Box office: $2 million (US rentals)

Elopement is a 1951 American comedy film directed by Henry Koster and starring Clifton Webb, Anne Francis, Charles Bickford and William Lundigan.

== Plot ==
Jacqueline "Jake" Osborne is sent to college to follow in the footsteps of her successful father Howard, but she falls in love with professor Matt Reagan. They impulsively decide to elope.

Howard and his wife are furious, but when they confront the young professor's parents, they find them equally irate. The parents hit the road together, hoping to prevent the marriage, while Jake and Matt begin to bicker and wonder whether their decision was too hasty.

== Cast ==
- Clifton Webb as Howard Osborne
- Anne Francis as Jacqueline "Jake" Osborne
- Charles Bickford as Tom Reagan
- William Lundigan as Matt Reagan
- Reginald Gardiner as Roger Evans
- Evelyn Varden as Millie Reagan
- Margalo Gillmore as Claire Osborne
- Tommy Rettig as Daniel Reagan

== Production ==
Filming began on July 16, 1951 and was completed by mid-August.

== Reception ==
In a contemporary review for The New York Times, critic A. H. Weiler wrote: "One thing is certain to judge by 'Elopement' ... It is proof positive that Twentieth Century-Fox is determined to keep its ace comic operative working steadily. Clifton Webb, then, may be listed as being employed but he is laboring on a molehill this time. For, in its strenuous attempt to be cheerful and polished, this decidedly obvious comedy of errors about a pair of confused young lovers and their equally confused parents merely stresses its pitifully limp story."

The Los Angeles Times review stated: "It's all very contrived, the plot, but so trimmed up with droll humor, fast fun and smart dialogue that it is one of the screen's happiest Christmas presents to fun-hungry fans."
