= Destination Hitchcock: The Making of North by Northwest =

- Directed by: Peter Fitzgerald
- Produced by: Turner Classic Movies; Peter Fitzgerald
- Starring: Eva Marie Saint; Patricia Hitchcock
- Cinematography: Andrew B. Andersen
- Edited by: Glenn Erickson
- Distributed by: Turner Classic Movies; Warner Home Video
- Release date: 2000
- Running time: 40 minutes
- Country: United States
- Language: English

Destination Hitchcock: The Making of North by Northwest is a 2000 documentary film about the making of Alfred Hitchcock's classic thriller film North by Northwest. It is hosted and narrated by the film's female lead, Eva Marie Saint and features interviews with Patricia Hitchcock, several of the technical and behind-the-scenes people involved with the production of the film, and the main surviving actor, Martin Landau. The film has gained wide circulation due to its inclusion in Warner Bros' release of North by Northwest in VHS and DVD formats which include this film as an additional feature.
