= Linda Lawson (actress) =

American actress and singer (1936–2022)

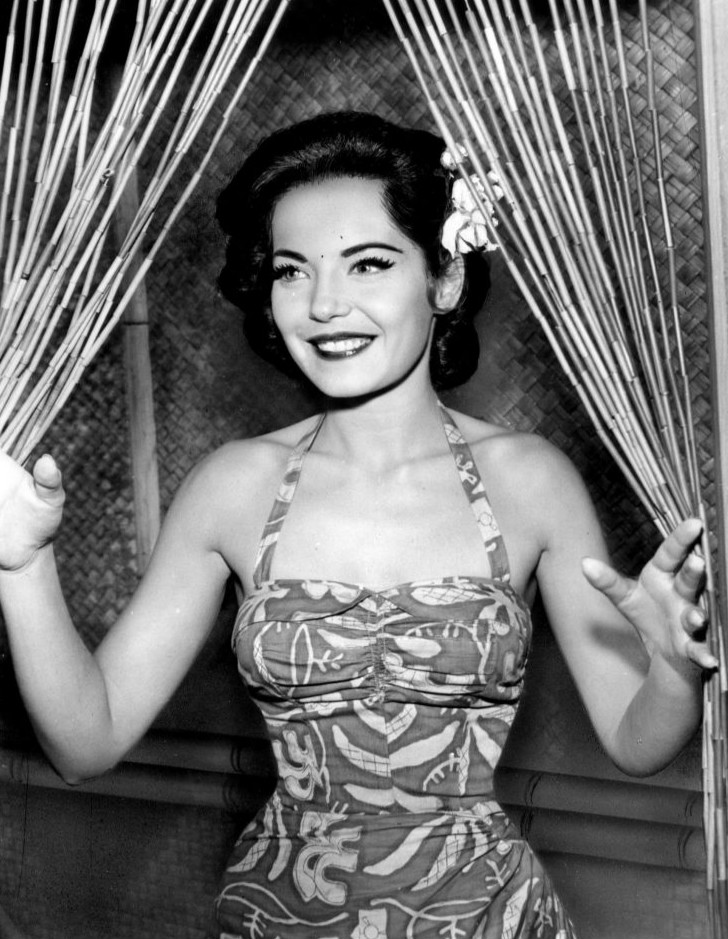
- Lawson in Adventures in Paradise.
- Born: Linda Gloria Spaziani; January 14, 1936; Michigan, U.S.
- Died: May 18, 2022 (aged 86); Woodland Hills, Los Angeles, California, U.S.
- Occupations: Actress, singer
- Years active: 1955–2005
- Spouse(s): John Foreman (m. 1961; died 1992)
- Children: 2, including Amanda Foreman

Linda Lawson (born Linda Gloria Spaziani; January 14, 1936 – May 18, 2022) was an American actress and singer.

== Early life and career ==
The first of three children born to Italian immigrants Maria Cataldi and Edward Spaziani, she was five years old when her family moved from Michigan to Fontana, California. After graduating from Chaffey High School, Linda followed her sister Diana Spaziani to Las Vegas and joined the Sands Hotel as a chorus girl. As a Sands showgirl she was photographed as "Miss Cue" in a promotional photo by the Las Vegas News Bureau promoting the Atomic testing in Nevada.

She appeared in several television series, including Alfred Hitchcock Presents; The Alfred Hitchcock Hour; Maverick starring James Garner, as Clint Eastwood's "other woman" in the episode "Duel at Sundown"; James Michener's Adventures in Paradise, as recurring character "Renee" in six episodes; Don't Call Me Charlie!, in which she portrayed "Pat Perry" for eighteen episodes; Ben Casey, seen as "Laura Fremont" for nine episodes; M Squad; Overland Trail, and Wagon Train, co-starring with Raymond Massey as the princess of a lost Aztec settlement.

Lawson also appeared in two episodes of Bonanza, It Takes a Thief, ER; The Virginian, Mr. Lucky, Perry Mason, The Real McCoys, The Aquanauts, Sea Hunt; Tales of Wells Fargo, 77 Sunset Strip; Hawaiian Eye; Border Patrol, Colt .45, Peter Gunn, Mickey Spillane's Mike Hammer and The Tall Man among many others.

She also appeared in several movies, including Sometimes a Great Notion. She co-starred opposite Dennis Hopper in Night Tide (1961).

== Personal life ==
She was married to film producer John Foreman. Amanda Foreman and Julie Foreman, both actresses, are their daughters. She died in Woodland Hills, Los Angeles on May 18, 2022, at the age of 86. Her death was announced 2 weeks later.

== Music ==
In 1960, Lawson recorded Introducing Linda Lawson. The music was conducted and arranged by Marty Paich.

Tracks:

- Are You With Me (H. Levin, D. Robinson)
- Where Flamingos Fly (J. Kennedy, M. Spoliansky)
- But Beautiful (J. Burke, J. VanHeusen)
- Me And My Shadow (B. Rose, A. Jolson, D. Dreyer)
- You Don't Know What Love Is (Raye, DePaul)
- Easy To Love (Cole Porter)
- Meaning of the Blues (Bobby Troup, Leah Worth)
- Mood Indigo (D. Ellington, I. Mills, A. Bigard)
- Like Young (P. F. Webster, A. Previn)
- Hi-Lili, Hi-Lo (H. Deutsch, B. Kaper)
- Make The Man Love Me (D. Fields, A. Schwartz)
- Up Pops Love (R. Faith, C. Kehner)

== Filmography ==
=== Film ===
Year	Title	Role	Notes
1960	The Threat	Gerri	
1961	Night Tide	Mora	
1964	Apache Rifles	Dawn Gillis	
1966	Let's Kill Uncle	Justine	
1970	Sometimes a Great Notion	Jan Stamper	
2005	The Tenants	Anna	

=== Television ===
Year	Title	Role	Notes
1958	Tales of the Texas Rangers	Dolores	Season 3 Episode 4: "Edge of Danger"
1958	Peter Gunn	Lynn Martel	Season 1 Episode 7: "Lynn's Blues"
1958	Man with a Camera	Carmen	Season 1 Episode 10: "Six Faces of Satan"
1959	Mickey Spillane's Mike Hammer	Kathy Dean	Season 2 Episode 33: "Wedding Mourning"
1959	Maverick	Lily	Season 2 Episode 19: "Duel at Sundown"
1959	Five Fingers	Princess Tucomcari	Season 1 Episode 3: "The Moment of Truth"
1959	Border Patrol	Anna	Season 1 Episode 30: "Hare and Hounds"
1959	The Millionaire	Marcia Littleton	Season 6 Episode 10: "Millionaire Sergeant Matthew Brogan"
1959	77 Sunset Strip	Doris	Season 1 Episode 20: "Lovely Alibi" (uncredited)
1959-61	Adventures in Paradise	Renee	5 episodes (Recurring role)
1960	77 Sunset Strip	Jeanne	Season 2 Episode 18: "Ten Cents a Death"
1960	Colt .45	Barbara	Season 3 Episode 12: "Impasse"
1960	Tombstone Territory	Jeannie Magraw	Season 3 Episode 17: "No Widow for Tombstone"
1960	Mr. Lucky	Angie	Season 1 Episode 18: "The Parolee"
1960	Overland Trail	Ruby, Saloon Girl	Season 1 Episode 4: "The High Bridge"
1960	M Squad	Delores Faye	Season 3 Episode 31: "Man with the Ice"
1960	Alfred Hitchcock Presents	Georgia	Season 5 Episode 31: "I Can Take Care of Myself"
1960	Richard Diamond, Private Detective	Nola Carter	Season 4 Episode 2: "And Whose Little Baby Are You?"
1960	Alcoa Presents: One Step Beyond	Joyce Chapman	Season 3 Episode 6: "Moment of Hate"
1960	Wagon Train	Princess Lia of the Aztecs	Season 4 Episode 6: "Princess of a Lost Tribe"
1960	Hawaiian Eye	Tiki	Season 1 Episode 21: "Fatal Cruise"
1960	Hawaiian Eye	Mona Lynn	Season 2 Episode 10: "Girl on a String"
1960	Tales of Wells Fargo	Kate Fallon	Season 5 Episode 13: "Escort to Santa Fe"
1960	Bonanza	Melinda Bowers	Season 2 Episode 11: "The Trail Gang"
1960	Sea Hunt	Nancy Stewart	Season 3 Episode 7: "Counterfeit"
1960	Sea Hunt	Rita Julien	Season 3 Episode 15: "The Living Fossil"
1961	Sea Hunt	Jill Marzack	Season 4 Episode 2: "River Treasure"
1961	Stagecoach West	Stella Smith	Season 1 Episode 21: "The Root of Evil"
1961	The Aquanauts	Wilva	Season 1 Episode 19: "The Defective Tank Adventure"
1961	The Aquanauts	Wilva	Season 1 Episode 20: "The Jeremiah Adventure"
1961	The Rifleman	Vashti Croxton	Season 3 Episode 26: "Assault"
1961	Perry Mason	Erin Mooney	Season 5 Episode 10: "The Case of the Injured Innocent"
1962	Target: The Corruptors!	Carolyn	Season 1 Episode 16: "One for the Road"
1962-63	Don't Call Me Charlie!	Pat Perry	18 episodes (Main role)
1963	The Real McCoys	Betty Lockwood	Season 6 Episode 20: "Luke in the Ivy League"
1963	The Real McCoys	Betty Lockwood	Season 6 Episode 33: "Luke Grows a Beard"
1964	Kraft Suspense Theatre	Gracia Hernandez	Season 2 Episode 9: "Threepersons"
1964	The Alfred Hitchcock Hour	Lucille Brown	Season 2 Episode 12: "Three Wives Too Many"
1965	The Alfred Hitchcock Hour	Fiona McNiece	Season 3 Episode 25: "The World's Oldest Motive"
1965	Bonanza	Maria Hackett	Season 6 Episode 29: "To Own the World"
1965	Ben Casey	Laura Fremont	9 episodes (Recurring role)
1966	The Virginian	Becky Ellis	Season 4 Episode 19: "Chaff in the Wind"
1968	It Takes a Thief	Jean	Season 2 Episode 11: "Glass Riddle"
1994	Saved by the Bell: The New Class	Mrs. Farrel	Season 2 Episode 2: "All Play and No Work"
2000	Another Woman's Husband	Agnes	TV film
2000-01	That's Life	Mrs. Paganini	9 episodes (Recurring role)
2002	Without a Trace	Mrs. Janey	Season 1 Episode 9: "In Extremis"
2005	Dr. Vegas	Flossie	Season 1 Episode 9: "Babe in the Woods"
2005	ER	Aunt Eileen	Season 11 Episode 20: "You Are Here"
