= Bess Taffel =

American screenwriter

- Born: December 10, 1913; New York City, New York, United States
- Died: July 21, 2000 (aged 86); Los Angeles, California, United States
- Occupation: Screenwriter
- Spouse: Robert F. Boyle

Bess Taffel Boyle (December 10, 1913 – July 21, 2000) was an American screenwriter, whose career was effectively ended after she was identified as a member of the Communist Party during the McCarthy period.

Taffel is known for writing such films as Elopement.

She wrote only a few television scripts from 1969 to 1974, before she ended her career entirely. She had worked in the Yiddish theatre before becoming a writer in Hollywood.

== Family ==
She was married to Robert F. Boyle, an Academy Award-winning film production designer and art director, until her death from a stroke in 2000 at age 86. They had two children. Her widower died at the age of 100 on August 1, 2010. His career was not impacted by his wife's blacklisting.

== Writing work ==
- Needles and Pins (TV series; 1 episode, 1974)

"With Such Enemies"

- Marcus Welby, M.D." (TV series)

"Please Don't Send Flowers" (1 episode, 1972)

- Bracken's World (TV series; 2 episodes, 1969–1970)

"A Perfect Piece of Casting" (1 episode, 1970)
"Closed Set" (1 episode, 1969)

- Elopement (1951; writer)
- A Likely Story (1947; writer)
- Badman's Territory (1946; writer)
