= List of 1963 box office number-one films in the United States =

This is a list of films which placed number one at the weekly box office in the United States during 1963.

== Number-one films ==
| † | This implies the highest-grossing movie of the year. |

| # | Week ending | Film | Notes | Ref |
|---|---|---|---|---|
| 1 | January 2, 1963 | Taras Bulba | | |
| 2 | January 9, 1963 | Taras Bulba | | |
| 3 | January 16, 1963 | Gypsy | | |
| 4 | January 23, 1963 | Mutiny on the Bounty | | |
| 5 | January 30, 1963 | Sodom and Gomorrah | | |
| 6 | February 6, 1963 | Lawrence of Arabia | | |
| 7 | February 13, 1963 | | No survey published | |
| 8 | February 20, 1963 | To Kill a Mockingbird | To Kill a Mockingbird reached number one in its eighth week of release | |
| 9 | February 27, 1963 | Son of Flubber | | |
| 10 | March 6, 1963 | Son of Flubber | | |
| 11 | March 13, 1963 | To Kill a Mockingbird | To Kill a Mockingbird returned to number one in its eleventh week of release | |
| 12 | March 20, 1963 | Days of Wine and Roses | | |
| 13 | March 27, 1963 | How the West Was Won | How the West Was Won reached number one in its fifth week of release | |
| 14 | April 3, 1963 | How the West Was Won | | |
| 15 | April 10, 1963 | The Birds | The Birds reached number one in its second week of release | |
| 16 | April 17, 1963 | The Birds | | |
| 17 | April 24, 1963 | How the West Was Won | How the West Was Won returned to number one in its ninth week of release | |
| 18 | May 1, 1963 | How the West Was Won | | |
| 19 | May 8, 1963 | How the West Was Won | | |
| 20 | May 15, 1963 | How the West Was Won | | |
| 21 | May 22, 1963 | How the West Was Won | | |
| 22 | May 29, 1963 | How the West Was Won | | |
| 23 | June 5, 1963 | 55 Days at Peking | | |
| 24 | June 12, 1963 | How the West Was Won | How the West Was Won returned to number one in its sixteenth week of release | |
| 25 | June 19, 1963 | How the West Was Won | | |
| 26 | June 26, 1963 | How the West Was Won | | |
| 27 | July 3, 1963 | Cleopatra † | Cleopatra reached number one in its third week of release grossing $725,000 from 17 key cities | |
| 28 | July 10, 1963 | Cleopatra † | | |
| 29 | July 17, 1963 | Cleopatra † | | |
| 30 | July 24, 1963 | Cleopatra † | | |
| 31 | July 31, 1963 | Cleopatra † | | |
| 32 | August 7, 1963 | Cleopatra † | | |
| 33 | August 14, 1963 | Cleopatra † | | |
| 34 | August 21, 1963 | Cleopatra † | | |
| 35 | August 28, 1963 | Cleopatra † | | |
| 36 | September 4, 1963 | Cleopatra † | | |
| 37 | September 11, 1963 | Cleopatra † | | |
| 38 | September 18, 1963 | Cleopatra † | | |
| 39 | September 25, 1963 | Cleopatra † | | |
| 40 | October 2, 1963 | The V.I.P.s | The V.I.P.s grossed $473,000 from 19 key cities | |
| 41 | October 9, 1963 | The V.I.P.s | | |
| 42 | October 16, 1963 | The V.I.P.s | | |
| 43 | October 23, 1963 | Cleopatra † | Cleopatra returned to number one in its 19th week of release | |
| 44 | October 30, 1963 | Cleopatra † | | |
| 45 | November 6, 1963 | Mary, Mary | | |
| 46 | November 13, 1963 | Mary, Mary | | |
| 47 | November 20, 1963 | Cleopatra † | Cleopatra returned to number one in its 23rd week of release | |
| 48 | November 27, 1963 | No data published | Following the assassination of John F. Kennedy, Variety did not publish box office figures for the week due to the reduced attendance, with theatres closed on Friday evening after the assassination and on Monday for his funeral as well as reduced attendance over the weekend | |
| 49 | December 4, 1963 | Under the Yum Yum Tree | | |
| 50 | December 11, 1963 | Under the Yum Yum Tree | | |
| 51 | December 18, 1963 | Under the Yum Yum Tree | | |
| 52 | December 25, 1963 | It's a Mad, Mad, Mad, Mad World | | |

== Highest-grossing films ==
The highest-grossing films during the calendar year based on theatrical rentals were as follows:

| Rank | Title | Distributor | Rental |
|---|---|---|---|
| 1 | Cleopatra | 20th Century Fox | $15,700,000 |
| 2 | The Longest Day | 20th Century Fox | $12,750,000 |
| 3 | Irma la Douce | United Artists | $9,250,000 |
| 4 | Lawrence of Arabia | Columbia Pictures | $9,000,000 |
| 5 | How the West Was Won | Metro-Goldwyn-Mayer | $8,000,000 |
| 6 | Mutiny on the Bounty | Metro-Goldwyn-Mayer | $7,700,000 |
| 7 | Son of Flubber | Buena Vista | $6,900,000 |
| 8 | To Kill a Mockingbird | Universal Pictures | $6,700,000 |
| 9 | Bye Bye Birdie | Columbia Pictures | $5,600,000 |
| 10 | Come Blow Your Horn | Paramount Pictures | $5,450,000 |

== See also ==
- List of American films — American films by year
- Lists of box office number-one films

== Chronology ==
| Preceded by 1962 | 1963 | Succeeded by 1964 |
