= List of 1960 box office number-one films in the United States =

This is a list of films which placed number one at the weekly box office in the United States during 1960.

== Number-one films ==
†	This implies the highest-grossing movie of the year.

#	Week ending	Film	Notes	Ref
1	January 6, 1960	Operation Petticoat		
2	January 13, 1960	Operation Petticoat		
3	January 20, 1960	Operation Petticoat		
4	January 27, 1960	Operation Petticoat		
5	February 3, 1960	Ben-Hur †	Ben-Hur reached number one in its eleventh week of release	
6	February 10, 1960	Ben-Hur †		
7	February 17, 1960	On the Beach		
8	February 24, 1960	Ben-Hur †	Ben-Hur returned to number one in its 14th week of release	
9	March 2, 1960	Ben-Hur †		
10	March 9, 1960	Ben-Hur †		
11	March 16, 1960	Ben-Hur †		
12	March 23, 1960	Ben-Hur †		
13	March 30, 1960	Ben-Hur †		
14	April 6, 1960	Ben-Hur †		
15	April 13, 1960	Ben-Hur †		
16	April 20, 1960	Please Don't Eat the Daisies		
17	April 27, 1960	Please Don't Eat the Daisies		
18	May 4, 1960	Ben-Hur †	Ben-Hur returned to number one in its 24th week of release	
19	May 11, 1960	Ben-Hur †		
20	May 18, 1960	Ben-Hur †		
21	May 25, 1960	Ben-Hur †		
22	June 1, 1960	Ben-Hur †		
23	June 8, 1960	Ben-Hur †		
24	June 15, 1960	Ben-Hur †		
25	June 22, 1960	Ben-Hur †	Ben-Hur grossed in excess of $409,000 in the key cities sampled	
26	June 29, 1960	Ben-Hur †		
27	July 6, 1960	Bells Are Ringing		
28	July 13, 1960	Ben-Hur †	Ben-Hur returned to number one in its 34th week of release	
29	July 20, 1960	Ben-Hur †		
30	July 27, 1960	Ben-Hur †		
31	August 3, 1960	Ben-Hur †		
32	August 10, 1960	Ben-Hur †		
33	August 17, 1960	Ocean's 11		
34	August 24, 1960	Ocean's 11		
35	August 31, 1960	Ocean's 11		
36	September 7, 1960	Ben-Hur †	Ben-Hur returned to number one in its 42nd week of release	
37	September 14, 1960	Ben-Hur †		
38	September 21, 1960	Ben-Hur †		
39	September 28, 1960	Ben-Hur †		
40	October 5, 1960	Ben-Hur †		
41	October 12, 1960	The Dark at the Top of the Stairs		
42	October 19, 1960	Ben-Hur †	Ben-Hur returned to number one in its 48th week of release	
43	October 26, 1960	Ben-Hur †		
44	November 2, 1960	Ben-Hur †		
45	November 9, 1960	Midnight Lace		
46	November 16, 1960	BUtterfield 8		
47	November 23, 1960	BUtterfield 8		
48	November 30, 1960	BUtterfield 8		
49	December 7, 1960	BUtterfield 8		
50	December 14, 1960	Ben-Hur †	Ben-Hur returned to number one in its 56th week of release	
51	December 21, 1960	Cinderfella		
52	December 28, 1960	Exodus		

== Highest-grossing films ==
The highest-grossing films during the calendar year based on theatrical rentals were as follows:

Rank	Title	Distributor	Rental
1	Ben-Hur	Metro-Goldwyn-Mayer	$17,300,000
2	South Pacific	20th Century Fox-Magna	$9,900,000
3	Psycho	Paramount Pictures	$8,500,000
4	Operation Petticoat	Universal Pictures	$6,800,000
5	Suddenly, Last Summer	Columbia Pictures	$5,500,000
6	On the Beach	United Artists	$5,300,000
7	Solomon and Sheba	United Artists	$5,250,000
8	The Apartment	United Artists	$5,100,000
9	From the Terrace	20th Century Fox	$5,000,000
9	Please Don't Eat the Daisies	Metro-Goldwyn-Mayer	$5,000,000

== See also ==
- List of American films — American films by year
- Lists of box office number-one films

== Chronology ==
Preceded by 1959	1960	Succeeded by 1961
