= North by Northwest =

1959 film by Alfred Hitchcock

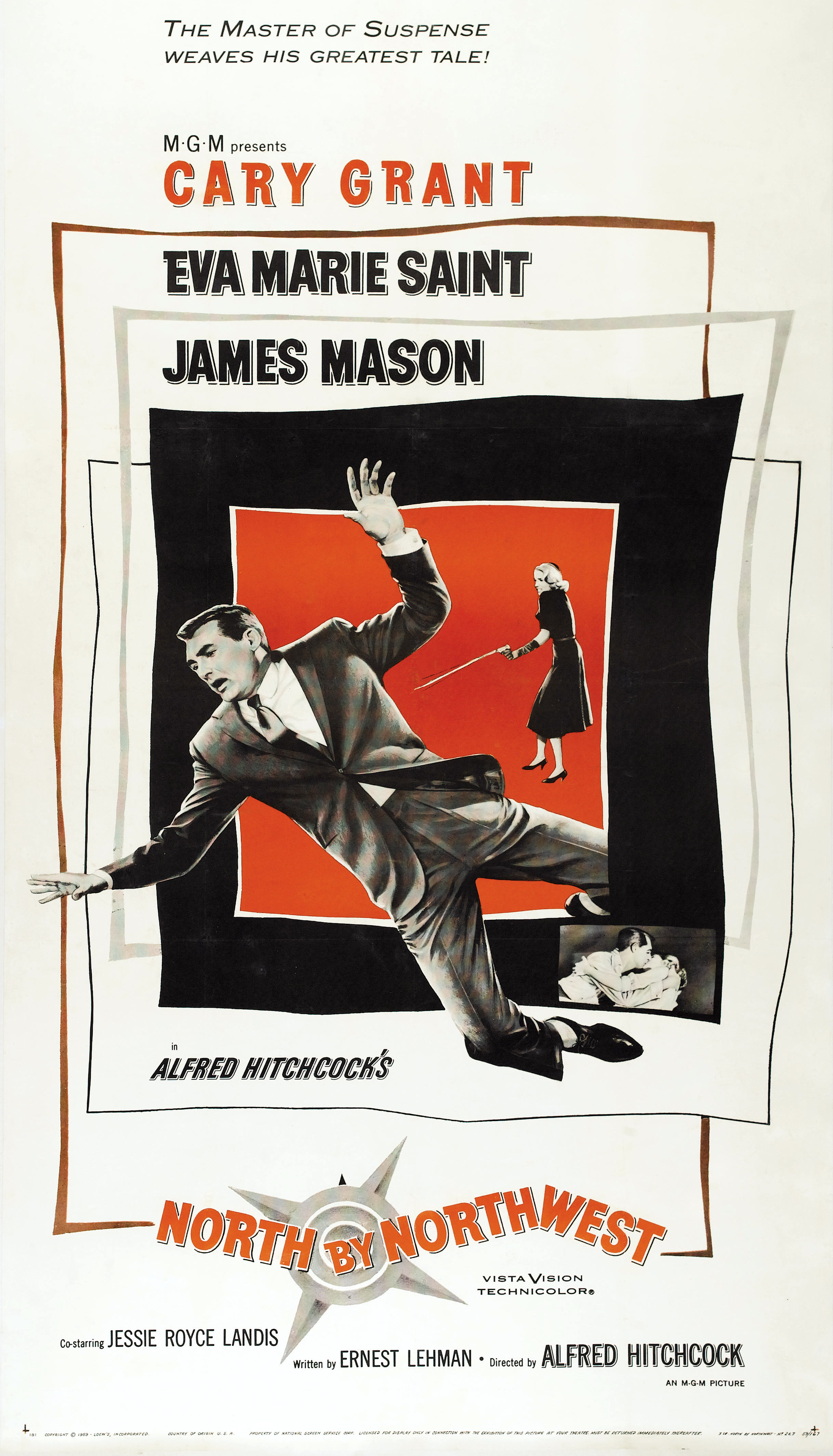
- Theatrical release poster
- Directed by: Alfred Hitchcock
- Written by: Ernest Lehman
- Produced by: Alfred Hitchcock
- Starring: Cary Grant; Eva Marie Saint; James Mason; Jessie Royce Landis
- Cinematography: Robert Burks
- Edited by: George Tomasini
- Music by: Bernard Herrmann
- Production company: Metro-Goldwyn-Mayer
- Distributed by: Metro-Goldwyn-Mayer
- Release date: July 1, 1959
- Running time: 136 minutes
- Country: United States
- Language: English
- Budget: $4.3 million
- Box office: $9.8 million

North by Northwest is a 1959 American spy thriller film produced and directed by Alfred Hitchcock, starring Cary Grant, Eva Marie Saint, and James Mason. The original screenplay written by Ernest Lehman was intended to be the basis for "the Hitchcock picture to end all Hitchcock pictures".

North by Northwest is a tale of mistaken identity: an innocent man (Grant) is pursued across the United States by agents of a mysterious organization that aims to prevent him from blocking their plan to smuggle microfilm containing government secrets out of the country. It is one of several Hitchcock films featuring a musical score by Bernard Herrmann and an opening title sequence by graphic designer Saul Bass. The film was the first to feature extended use of kinetic typography in its opening credits.

The film was released on July 1, 1959, to critical and commercial success. It topped the box office in the United States for seven consecutive weeks. The film was nominated for three Academy Awards and earned Hitchcock the Silver Shell for Best Director at the San Sebastián Film Festival.

North by Northwest is listed among the canonical Hitchcock films of the 1950s and is widely regarded as one of the greatest films ever made. In 1995, the Library of Congress selected North by Northwest for preservation in the National Film Registry, having been deemed "culturally, historically, or aesthetically significant".

== Plot ==
In the late 1950’s, a waiter pages George Kaplan at the Oak Room restaurant at the Plaza Hotel in New York City at the request of two well-dressed men. While summoning the same waiter, advertising executive Roger Thornhill is mistaken for Kaplan, kidnapped by the pair, and brought to the estate of Lester Townsend in Glen Cove. Townsend interrogates Thornhill and subsequently arranges to kill him in a staged drunk-driving crash; Thornhill survives, but fails to convince the police or his mother of what happened. Upon returning to the estate, Thornhill learns that Townsend is a United Nations diplomat.

Thornhill and his mother sneak into Kaplan's empty room at the Plaza, where the thugs have followed him. Thornhill heads to the United Nations General Assembly Building to meet Townsend, who turns out to be a different man. As he asks him about the man impersonating him, one of the gang's thugs throws a knife into Townsend's back. Thornhill is photographed grabbing at the knife, giving the appearance that he is the murderer. Thornhill flees, attempting to find the real Kaplan.

The "United States Intelligence Agency" (USIA) realizes that Thornhill has been mistaken for Kaplan, a non-existent agent they created as a decoy to distract their quarries, but its chief, "the Professor", decides against rescuing him for fear of compromising their operation. Thornhill sneaks aboard the luxurious 20th Century Limited train to Chicago without a ticket and meets Eve Kendall, who hides him from the police in her stateroom's upper berth. Kendall helps Thornhill elude a police dragnet. Kendall then says that she has arranged a meeting with Kaplan at a rural bus stop in Indiana. Thornhill arrives there and is attacked by a crop duster armed with a machine gun. After being flushed from cover in a cornfield, he attempts to halt a passing tanker truck; the airplane crashes into it and both explode. In the ensuing confusion, Thornhill steals a bystander's pickup truck. At Kaplan's hotel in Chicago, Thornhill learns that Kaplan had checked out before the time when Kendall claimed to have spoken with him. He goes to her room and confronts her, but she eludes him.

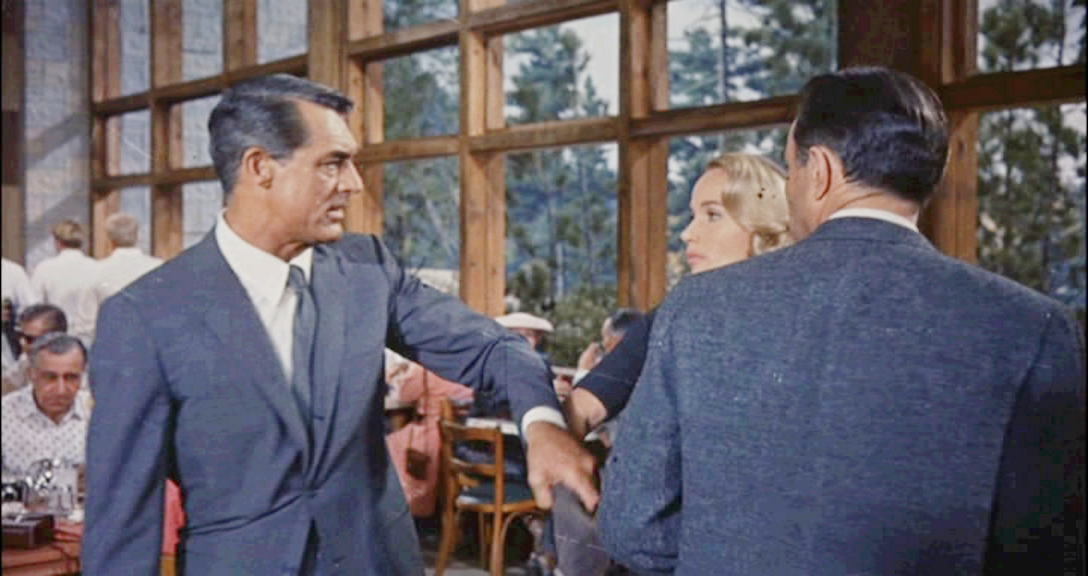
Roger Thornhill, Eve Kendall, and Phillip Vandamm at the Mount Rushmore visitor center

Thornhill tracks Kendall to an art auction, where the Townsend impersonator—Phillip Vandamm, the ringleader of the group—is purchasing a small statue. Vandamm instructs his henchmen to deal with Thornhill. Thornhill disrupts the auction until police are called to remove him. He confesses to them that he is the fugitive murderer, but the Professor intervenes. At the airport, he tells Thornhill that Kaplan was fictitious and that Kendall is their real agent. Vandamm lives above Mount Rushmore, and the agency thinks he will be leaving the country by plane from there. Thornhill agrees to help maintain Kendall's cover.

At the Mount Rushmore visitor center, now playing the role of Kaplan at the USIA's request, Thornhill negotiates for Vandamm's turnover of Kendall to be arrested. Kendall shoots Thornhill with blanks and flees. Afterward, the Professor arranges for Thornhill and Kendall to meet; Thornhill learns that Kendall is to depart on the plane with Vandamm and his right-hand man Leonard. He tries to dissuade her from going, but is knocked unconscious by the Professor's driver and locked in a hospital room.

Thornhill escapes, goes to Vandamm's home to rescue Kendall and overhears that the sculpture holds microfilm and that Leonard has discovered the blanks in Kendall's gun. Vandamm indicates that he will throw Kendall from the plane; Thornhill warns her with a surreptitious note. Vandamm, Leonard, and Kendall head for the plane. Thornhill is held at gunpoint by the housekeeper until he realizes she is holding Kendall's gun. As Vandamm boards, Kendall takes the sculpture and runs to the pursuing Thornhill, and they flee to the top of Mount Rushmore. While climbing down, they are pursued by Vandamm's men. A park ranger fatally shoots Leonard, and Vandamm is taken into custody by the Professor.

As Kendall hangs on by her fingertips, Thornhill reaches down to pull her up and there is a cut to Thornhill pulling Kendall into the upper berth of a train compartment, saying, "Come along, Mrs. Thornhill". They share a passionate embrace as the train enters a tunnel.

== Cast ==
Cast information from Turner Classic Movies Database

- Cary Grant as Roger Thornhill
- Eva Marie Saint as Eve Kendall
- James Mason as Phillip Vandamm
- Jessie Royce Landis as Clara Thornhill
- Leo G. Carroll as The Professor
- Josephine Hutchinson as "Mrs. Townsend"
- Philip Ober as Lester Townsend
- Martin Landau as Leonard
- Adam Williams as Valerian
- Edward Platt as Victor Larrabee
- Robert Ellenstein as Licht
- Les Tremayne as Auctioneer
- Philip Coolidge as Dr. Cross
- Patrick McVey as Sergeant Flamm
- Edward Binns as Captain Junket
- Ken Lynch as Charlie

Uncredited cast

- Malcolm Atterbury as Man at the crossroads
- Tol Avery as State Police Detective
- John Beradino as Sergeant Emile Klinger
- Sara Berner as Telephone Operator (voice)
- Ned Glass as Ticket Seller
- Doreen Lang as Maggie, Roger's Secretary
- Alexander Lockwood as Judge Anson B. Flynn
- Nora Marlowe as Anna, the housekeeper
- Maudie Prickett as Elsie the Maid
- Ralph Reed as Bellboy
- Robert Shayne as Larry Wade
- Olan Soule as Assistant Auctioneer
- Frank Wilcox as Herman Weitner
- Carleton Young as Fanning Nelson

Hitchcock's cameo appearances are a signature occurrence in most of his films. In North by Northwest, he is seen getting a bus door slammed in his face just as his credit appears on the screen. There has been some speculation as to whether he made one of his rare second appearances, this time at around the 45-minute mark in drag as a woman in a turquoise dress on the train, but the woman was played by Jesslyn Fax, who went on to appear in many episodes of Alfred Hitchcock Presents. She had previously appeared in Rear Window.

== Production ==
=== Writing ===
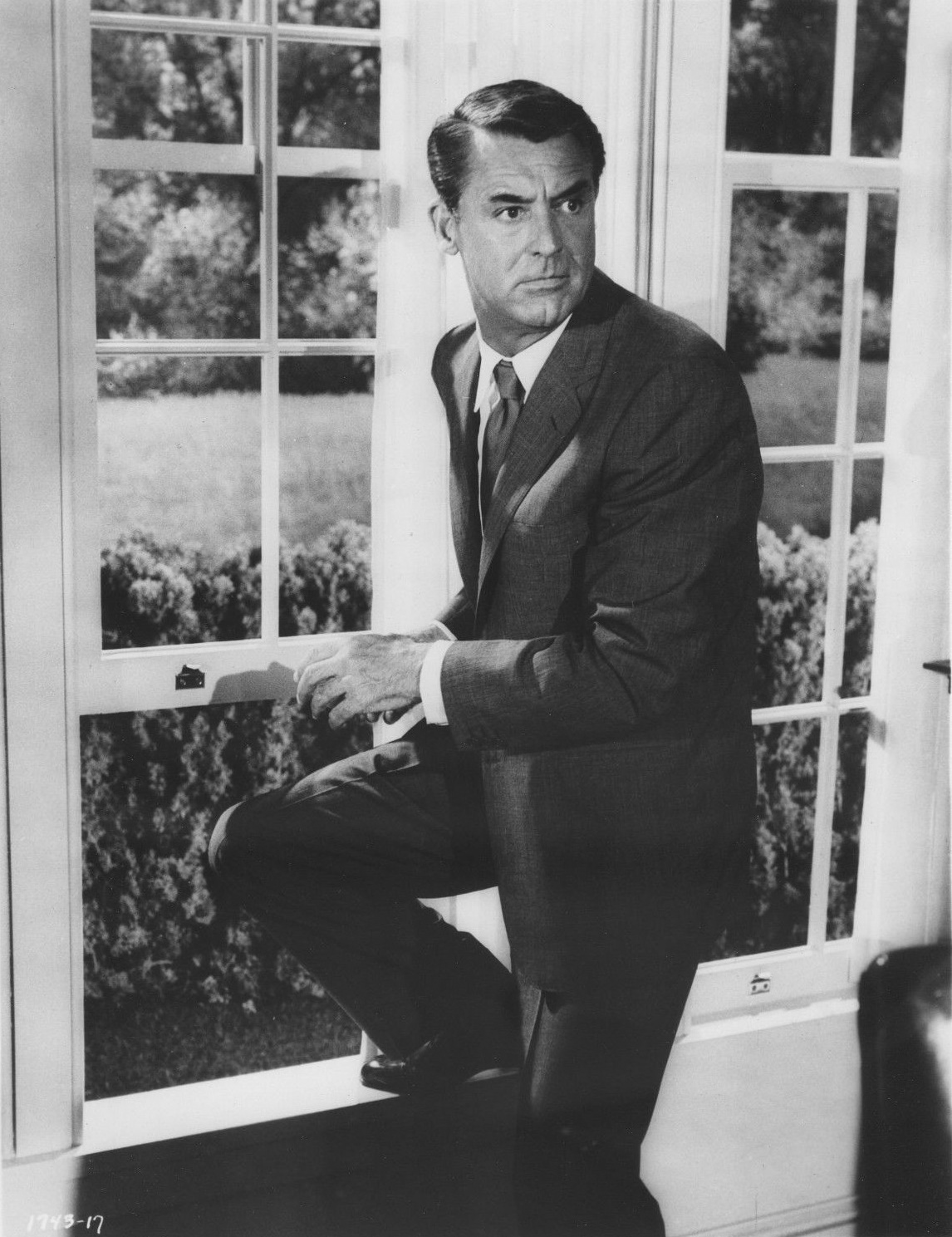
Cary Grant in an original still for the film

Hitchcock often told journalists of an idea that he had about Cary Grant hiding from the villains inside Abraham Lincoln's nose and being given away when he sneezes. He speculated that the film could be called The Man on Lincoln's Nose. Hitchcock sat on the idea, waiting for the right screenwriter to develop it. The original traveling salesman character had been suited to James Stewart, but Lehman changed it to a Madison Avenue advertising executive, a position that he had formerly held.

John Russell Taylor's 1978 biography Hitch: The Life and Times of Alfred Hitchcock suggests that the story originated after a spell of writer's block during the scripting of another film project:

Alfred Hitchcock had agreed to do a film for MGM and they had chosen an adaptation of the novel The Wreck of the Mary Deare by Hammond Innes. Composer Bernard Herrmann had recommended that Hitchcock work with his friend Ernest Lehman. After a couple of weeks, Lehman offered to quit saying he didn't know what to do with the story. Hitchcock told him they got along great together and they would just write something else. Lehman said that he wanted to make the ultimate Hitchcock film. Hitchcock thought for a moment then said he had always wanted to do a chase across Mount Rushmore. Lehman and Hitchcock brainstormed more ideas: a murder at the United Nations headquarters; a murder at a car plant in Detroit; a final showdown in Alaska. Eventually they settled on the U.N. murder for the opening and the chase across Mount Rushmore for the climax. For the central idea, Hitchcock remembered something an American journalist had told him about spies creating a fake agent as a decoy. Perhaps their hero could be mistaken for this fictitious agent and end up on the run. They bought the idea from the journalist for $10,000.

Lehman repeated this story in the documentary Destination Hitchcock: The Making of North by Northwest that accompanied the 2001 DVD release of the film. Screenwriter William Goldman insisted in Which Lie Did I Tell? that it was Lehman who created North by Northwest and that many of Hitchcock's ideas were not used. Hitchcock had the idea of the hero being stranded in the middle of nowhere but suggested that the villains try to kill him with a tornado. "But they're trying to kill him. How are they going to work up a cyclone?" Lehman responded. "I just can't tell you who said what to whom, but somewhere during that afternoon, the cyclone in the sky became the crop-duster plane."

Hitchcock had been working on the story for nearly nine years prior to meeting Lehman. Otis Guernsey was the American journalist who had the idea which influenced Hitchcock; he was inspired by Operation Mincemeat, a British intelligence operation during World War II in which MI5 invented a fictitious officer and planted a dead body and misleading papers to be discovered by the Germans in order to mislead them about the coming Allied invasion of Sicily. Guernsey turned his idea into a story about an American salesman who travels to the Middle East and is mistaken for a fictitious agent, becoming "saddled with a romantic and dangerous identity".

Guernsey admitted that his treatment was full of "corn" and "lacking logic", and he urged Hitchcock to do what he liked with the story. Hitchcock bought the 60 pages for $10,000. In an interview in the book Screenwriters on Screenwriting (1995), Lehman stated that he had already written much of the screenplay before coming up with critical elements of the climax. An example of the "corn" in the finished screenplay was the scene where Roger Thornhill returns to the Townsend estate with the detectives to find everything changed. If Thornhill was indeed a spy, he would have had no reason to return to the estate after his escape the previous night, nor would the criminals be expecting him to return as they obviously did.

This was the only Hitchcock film released by Metro-Goldwyn-Mayer. Since 1986, it has been owned by Turner Entertainment, as part of the pre-May 1986 MGM film library that it acquired through temporary ownership of MGM.

Production costs on North by Northwest rose when a delay in filming put Cary Grant into the penalty phase of his contract, resulting in his being paid an additional $5,000 per day before shooting even began.

=== Casting ===
Eva Marie Saint's agent had told her that she had received an invitation to a dinner with Alfred Hitchcock and his family, the first time she and Hitchcock met. Days after the dinner, Saint's mother called her and reminded her that Hitchcock loved casting women wearing beige clothing and white gloves. Following her mother's advice, she met with Hitchcock again, wearing that combination. She credited this for helping her win the role. MGM wanted Cyd Charisse for the role of Eve Kendall. Hitchcock stood by his choice of Saint.

Hitchcock attended the play Middle of the Night in order to watch a performance by Edward G. Robinson. After being impressed by the performance of Martin Landau, Hitchcock asked to meet him at MGM. Landau arrived and Hitchcock showed him the entirety of the project, including the storyboards; while they were looking at the project, Hitchcock turned and told Landau, "You're now Leonard."

=== Filming ===
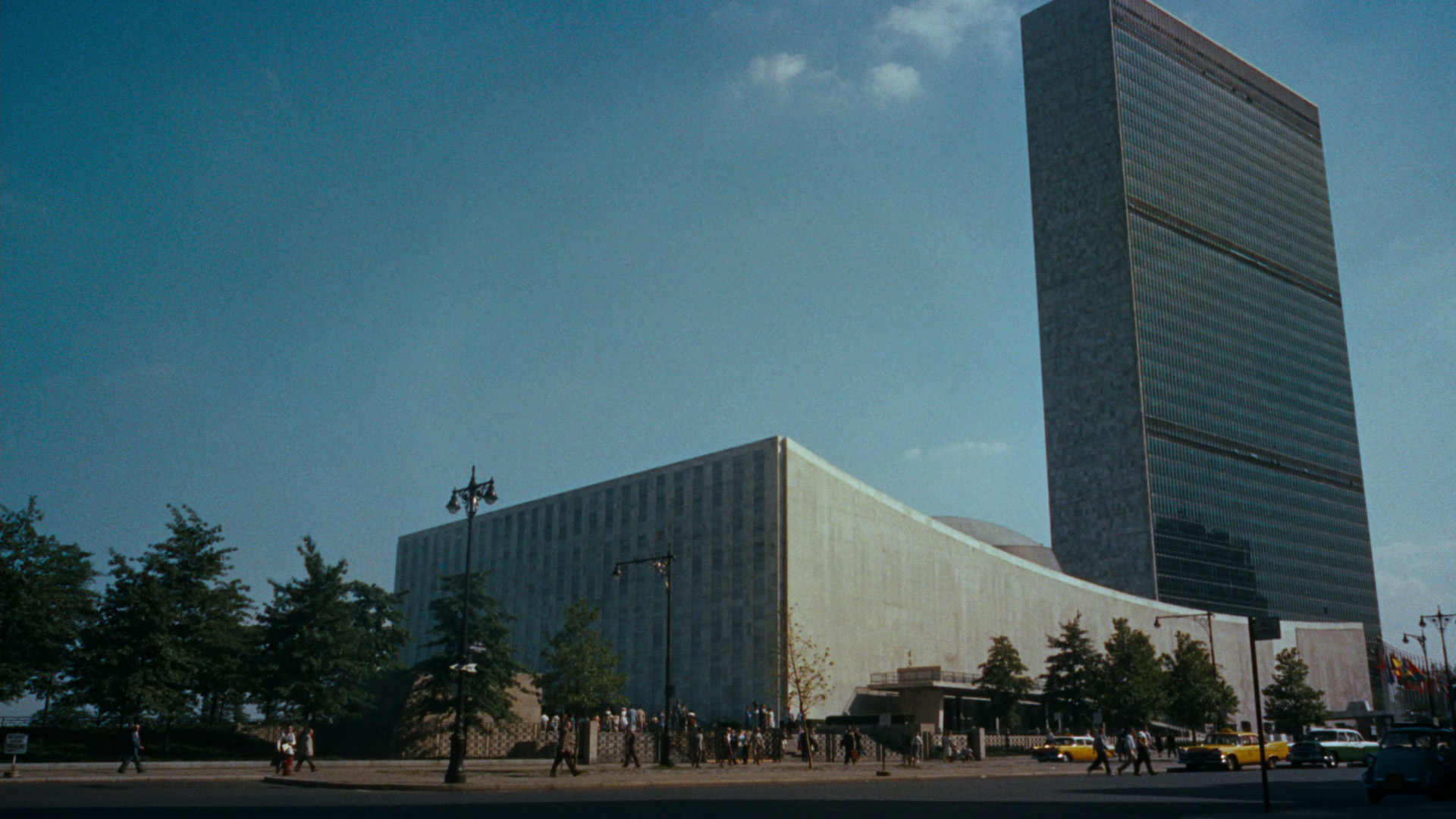
The Headquarters of the United Nations is the location of a scene in the film.

At Hitchcock's insistence, the film was made in Paramount's VistaVision widescreen process. The only other VistaVision film made at MGM was High Society.

The opening title sequence by graphic designer Saul Bass made North by Northwest the first film to feature extended use of kinetic typography in its opening credits.

The aircraft flying in the aerial chase scene is a Naval Aircraft Factory N3N Canary, better known as the "Yellow Peril", a World War II Navy primary trainer sometimes converted for crop-dusting. The aircraft that hits the truck and explodes is a wartime Boeing-Stearman Model 75 trainer, and many of these were used for agricultural purposes until the 1970s. The plane was piloted by Bob Coe, a crop-duster from Wasco, California. Hitchcock placed replicas of square Indiana highway signs in the scene. In 2000, The Guardian ranked the crop-duster scene at No. 29 on their list of "The top 100 film moments". The British film magazine Empire ranked it as the "greatest movie moment" of all time in its August 2009 issue.

Among the locations used in the film are:

- 430 Park Avenue 40.760694°N 73.971680°W
  - This is the building used by Bass during the opening credits. The building was constructed in 1916 as a luxury apartment tower called the Avenue Apartments and was designed by the firm Warren and Wetmore. In 1953, the building was stripped of its façade, given a new curtain wall designed by Emery Roth and Sons in the style of Lever House, and converted to offices. Bass's title sequence is based on the geometric structure of the international style.
- Commercial Investment Trust Building (650 Madison Avenue, New York) 40.763965°N 73.971302°W
  - This is the location of Roger Thornhill's office, and the building he walks out of in his first appearance in the film. The CIT Building was designed by the firm Harrison and Abramovitz and constructed in 1957.
- Plaza Hotel (768 Fifth Avenue, New York) 40.764733°N 73.974241°W
  - After taking a cab with his secretary, Thornhill has a drink in the Oak Room of the Plaza Hotel. It is here that he is kidnapped by Vandamm's henchmen. Thornhill later returns to the Plaza, where he breaks into George Kaplan's room. For space reasons, most of the shots in and around the Oak Room were actually done on a set. Cary Grant had long kept a room at the Plaza which he would use during breaks in filming. Eva Marie Saint relates that Hitchcock provided Grant with no direction during a scene in which the actor was required to cross the hotel lobby, explaining afterwards 'He's been walking across this lobby for years, I don't need to tell him how'.
- Old Westbury Gardens (71 Old Westbury Road, Old Westbury, New York) 40.773822°N 73.594921°W
  - Thornhill's kidnappers drive him to Townsend's estate on Long Island. After questioning Thornhill, Vandamm instructs Leonard and his other henchmen to intoxicate Thornhill by force.
- United Nations headquarters 40.749127°N 73.968327°W
  - Following Thornhill's escape from Vandamm's henchmen at the Plaza, he takes a taxi to the United Nations headquarters to meet Lester Townsend. The U.N. headquarters buildings were also designed by Harrison and Abramovitz, the architects of Thornhill's office. The scene of Cary Grant going to the United Nations in New York was filmed illicitly because, after reviewing the script, U.N. authorities denied permission to film on or near its property. After two failed attempts to get the required shots, Hitchcock had Grant pull up in a taxicab right outside the General Assembly Building while a hidden camera crew filmed him exiting the vehicle and walking across the plaza.
- Grand Central Terminal (89 East 42nd Street, New York) 40.752724°N 73.977221°W
  - Following the murder of Townsend at the United Nations, Thornhill rushes to Grand Central Terminal, where he sneaks onto the 20th Century Limited en route to Chicago.
- LaSalle Street Station (414 South LaSalle Street, Chicago) 41.875304°N 87.632152°W
  - Thornhill and Eve Kendall arrive in Chicago at the LaSalle Street Station. At the station, Kendall gives Thornhill the instructions for his meeting with Kaplan.
- Prairie Stop 35.760814°N 119.561721°W
  - The famous "crop duster scene", which the film sets in rural Indiana, was actually filmed near Wasco, California. Hitchcock added square signs to the location to replicate those found in Indiana.
- Ambassador East Hotel 41.905856°N 87.628303°W
  - Thornhill returns to Chicago in a stolen truck that he parks outside the Ambassador East Hotel. The hotel, designed by Robert S. DeGolyer and Co., opened in 1926. Today, it continues to be operated as a hotel, under the name The Ambassador.
- Chicago Midway Airport 41.788372°N 87.744211°W
  - Following Thornhill's arrest at the auction, he and the Professor travel to Midway Airport, where they board a flight for Rapid City, South Dakota. The terminal seen in the film was built in 1945–46 and was designed by architect Paul Gerhardt Sr. This terminal building was demolished in 2002.
- Memorial View Building, Mount Rushmore 43.877014°N 103.456213°W
  - The spurious murder of Roger Thornhill takes place in the Buffalo Room of the Memorial View Building at Mount Rushmore, the one location in the park where Hitchcock was permitted to film. This building was constructed in 1957 as part of the National Park Service's Mission 66 program, and was designed jointly by NPS architect Cecil J. Doty and local architect Harold Spitznagel. The building was demolished in 1994.
- Vandamm House
  - Vandamm's house, set on a cliff atop Mount Rushmore, was not a real structure. Hitchcock asked the set designers to make the house in the style of Frank Lloyd Wright—at the time the most popular architect in the United States—using the materials, form, and interiors associated with him. Set designer Robert F. Boyle planned the house, which featured a cantilevered living room and made extensive use of limestone. Exterior shots were done using matte paintings, while interior shots were filmed on a set in a soundstage at MGM in Culver City, California.

=== Costuming ===
A panel of fashion experts convened by GQ in 2006 declared the gray suit worn by Cary Grant throughout almost the entire film the best suit in film history and the most influential on men's style, stating that it has since been copied for Tom Cruise's character in Collateral and Ben Affleck's character in Paycheck. This sentiment has been echoed by writer Todd McEwen, who called it "gorgeous" and wrote a short story, "Cary Grant's Suit", that recounts the film's plot, featuring the suit.

There is some disagreement as to who tailored the suit; Vanity Fair magazine claimed it was Norton & Sons of London, although according to The Independent, it was Quintino of Beverly Hills. Another article states that Grant had his Savile Row tailor, Kilgour French and Stanbury, make the suit. A label reading "Quintino" is visible on one of the suits in the film, but this is because Quintino made duplicate suits for scenes involving more activity or stunts.

Eva Marie Saint's wardrobe for the film was originally chosen by MGM. Hitchcock disliked MGM's selections, and the actress and director went to Bergdorf Goodman in New York to select what she would wear.

=== Editing and post-production ===
In François Truffaut's book-length interview, Hitchcock/Truffaut (1967), Hitchcock said that MGM wanted North by Northwest cut by 15 minutes so that the film would run under two hours. Hitchcock had his agent check his contract, learned that he had absolute control over the final cut, and refused.

One of Eva Marie Saint's lines in the dining-car seduction scene was redubbed. She originally said, "I never make love on an empty stomach", but it was changed in post-production to "I never discuss love on an empty stomach", as the censors considered the original version too risqué.

== Release ==
Trailer for North by Northwest

The film opened on July 1, 1959, at the United Artists Theatre in Chicago. It had a seven-week run at Radio City Music Hall in August and September 1959. One trailer for North by Northwest features Hitchcock presenting himself as the owner of Alfred Hitchcock Travel Agency and telling the viewer he has made a motion picture to advertise these wonderful vacation stops. A new 70mm restoration of the film, remastered in 13K resolution from the original VistaVision elements, premiered at the 2024 Tribeca Festival on June 12, 2024, to celebrate the film's 65th anniversary.

=== Home media ===
North by Northwest was released on Blu-ray in the United States in November 2009, by Warner Bros. with a 1080p VC-1 encoding. This release was a special 50th-anniversary edition, restored and remastered from original VistaVision elements. A DVD edition was also released. A 65th anniversary 4K Ultra HD Blu-ray was released in 2024 by Warner Bros. Home Entertainment.

== Reception ==
=== Box office ===
In its opening in Chicago, it grossed $46,000 in its first week and $35,000 the second week. The film grossed $209,000 in its opening week at Radio City Music Hall, setting a record opening week at the theater, as well as its record non-holiday week gross, and went on to gross a record $404,056 in two weeks. Its opening at the Music Hall saw it become the number one film at the US box office, where it remained for its seven weeks at the Music Hall. By the end of August, it had grossed $2,568,000 from 139 engagements ($28.4 million in 2025 dollars).

According to MGM records, the film earned theatrical rentals of $5,740,000 in the United States and Canada and $4.1 million elsewhere, resulting in a profit of $837,000.

=== Critical reception ===
A contemporary in Time called the film "smoothly troweled and thoroughly entertaining". A. H. Weiler of The New York Times made it a "Critic's Pick" and said it was the "year's most scenic, intriguing and merriest chase"; he also complimented the two leads:

Cary Grant, a veteran member of the Hitchcock acting varsity, was never more at home than in this role of the advertising-man-on-the-lam. He handles the grimaces, the surprised look, the quick smile, ... and all the derring-do with professional aplomb and grace, In casting Eva Marie Saint as his romantic vis-à-vis, Mr. Hitchcock has plumbed some talents not shown by the actress heretofore. Although she is seemingly a hard, designing type, she also emerges both the sweet heroine and a glamorous charmer.

Period film critic Charles Champlin saw the film as an "anthology of typical Hitchcockian situations" and was particularly taken by the crop duster scene, which he believed was representative of Hitchcock's finest work. Sight and Sound critic Penelope Houston called it "the purest piece of entertainment filmmaking". In 2002 author and journalist Nick Clooney praised Lehman's story and dialogue, calling the film "certainly Alfred Hitchcock's most stylish thriller, if not his best".

The London edition of Time Out, reviewing the film in 2008, commented:

Fifty years on, you could say that Hitchcock's sleek, wry, paranoid thriller caught the zeitgeist perfectly: Cold War shadiness, secret agents of power, urbane modernism, the ant-like bustle of city life, and a hint of dread behind the sharp suits of affluence. Cary Grant's Roger Thornhill, the film's sharply dressed ad exec who is sucked into a vortex of mistaken identity, certainly wouldn't be out of place in Mad Men. But there's nothing dated about this perfect storm of talent, from Hitchcock and Grant to writer Ernest Lehman (Sweet Smell of Success), co-stars James Mason and Eva Marie Saint, composer Bernard Herrmann and even designer Saul Bass, whose opening-credits sequence still manages to send a shiver down the spine.

The Village Voice ranked North by Northwest at No. 49 in its "Top 250 Best Films of the Century" list in 1999, based on a poll of critics. Entertainment Weekly voted it the 44th-greatest film of all time in 1999. The film was voted at No. 28 on the list of "100 Greatest Films" by the prominent French magazine Cahiers du cinéma in 2008. In 2010, The Guardian ranked it as the second-best action and war film of all time. The film ranks at No. 98 in Empire's 2011 list of the 500 Greatest Films of All Time. In the British Film Institute's 2012 Sight & Sound polls of the greatest films ever made, North by Northwest was ranked 53rd among critics;

As of 2026, North by Northwest holds a 97% rating on the review aggregator Rotten Tomatoes, based on 119 reviews, with an average rating of 9.5/10. The site states the critical consensus as: "Gripping, suspenseful and visually iconic, this late-period Hitchcock classic laid the groundwork for countless action thrillers to follow." On Metacritic, it has a score of 98 out of 100, based on reviews from 16 critics. In 1998, North by Northwest was voted the twelfth greatest film of all time in a Time Out poll.

North by Northwest was ranked 13th in BBC's 2015 list of the 100 greatest American films. In 2022, Time Out named North by Northwest the greatest thriller film ever made. In 2006, the Writers Guild of America ranked the screenplay No. 21 on its 2020 list of 101 Greatest Screenplays ever written. It is ranked the 40th-greatest American film by the American Film Institute. The Sight and Sound Greatest Films of All Time 2022 poll ranked the film 45th among critics.

=== Awards ===
North by Northwest was nominated for three Academy Awards—Best Film Editing (George Tomasini), Best Art Direction – Set Decoration, Color (William A. Horning, Robert F. Boyle, Merrill Pye, Henry Grace, and Frank R. McKelvy), and Best Original Screenplay (Ernest Lehman)—at the 32nd Academy Awards ceremony. Two of the three awards went instead to Ben-Hur, and the other went to Pillow Talk. The film—and Lehman specifically—also won a 1960 Edgar Award for Best Motion Picture Screenplay. Hitchcock received his second Silver Shell for Best Director award at the San Sebastián International Film Festival. (He was also awarded the Silver Shell the year before for Vertigo.)

In 1995, North by Northwest was selected for preservation in the National Film Registry by the United States Library of Congress as being "culturally, historically, or aesthetically significant." In June 2008, the American Film Institute revealed its "10 Top 10"—the best 10 films in 10 "classic" American film genres—after polling over 1,500 people from the creative community. North by Northwest was acknowledged as the seventh-best film in the mystery genre. It was also listed as No. 40 in AFI's 100 Years...100 Movies, No. 4 in AFI's 100 Years...100 Thrills, and No. 55 in AFI's 100 Years...100 Movies (10th Anniversary Edition).

== Themes and motifs ==
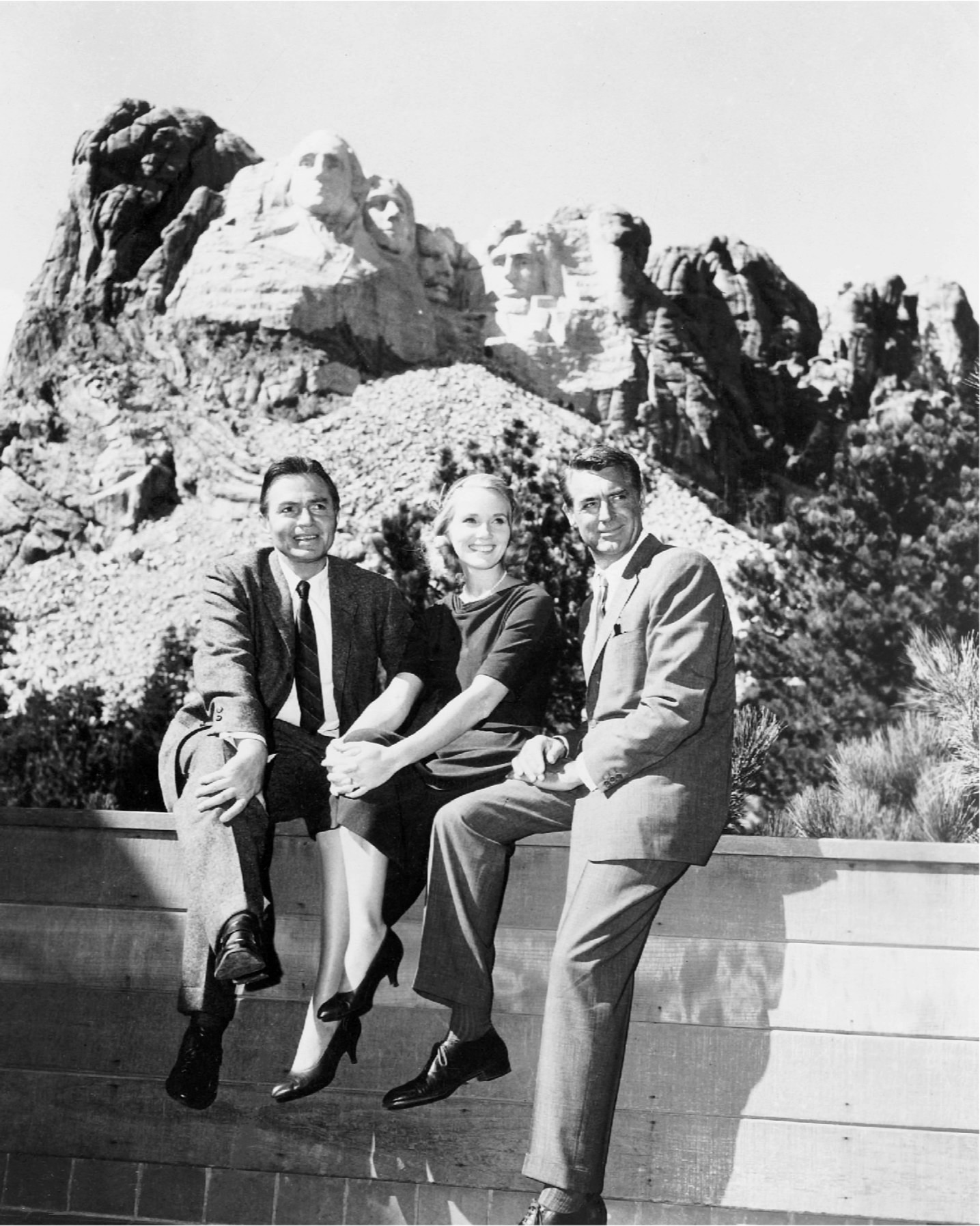
James Mason, Eva Marie Saint and Cary Grant at Mount Rushmore during filming. Studio mockups were intercut with actual monument footage for the climactic scene.

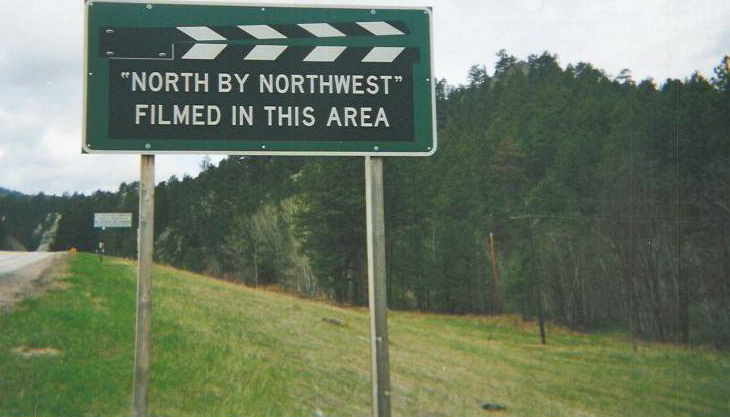
Sign near Mount Rushmore

Hitchcock planned the film as a change of pace after his dark romantic psychological thriller Vertigo a year earlier. In his book-length interview Hitchcock/Truffaut (1967) with François Truffaut, Hitchcock said that he wanted to do "something fun, light-hearted, and generally free of the symbolism permeating his other movies." Writer Ernest Lehman has mocked those who look for symbolism in the film. In addition to its popular appeal, the film is considered to be a masterpiece for its themes of deception, mistaken identity, and moral relativism in the Cold War era.

Some have mistaken the title North by Northwest as having come from a line in Hamlet ("I am but mad north-north-west: when the wind is southerly I know a hawk from a handsaw"), a work also concerned with the shifty nature of reality. However, Hitchcock explained in an interview with Peter Bogdanovich in 1963: "It's a fantasy. The whole film is epitomized in the title—there is no such thing as north-by-northwest on the compass." (The similar "northwest by north" is one of 32 points of the compass.)

Lehman states that he used a working title for the film of In a Northwesterly Direction because the film's action was to begin in New York and climax in Alaska. Then the head of the story department at MGM suggested North by Northwest, but this was still to be a working title—shared with the public as early as June 1958. Other titles were considered, including The Man on Lincoln's Nose, but North by Northwest was kept because, according to Lehman, "We never did find a [better] title." The Northwest Airlines was worked into the film, reinforcing the title.

The film's plot involves a "MacGuffin" (a term popularized by Hitchcock), a physical object that everyone in the film pursues but which itself has no deep relationship to the plot. Late in North by Northwest, it emerges that the spies are attempting to smuggle microfilm containing government secrets out of the country. The film's protagonist, Roger Thornhill, becomes involved only through a case of mistaken identity (with a spy that does not even exist, "George Kaplan"), and becomes a target for elimination only when he becomes a persistent nuisance as a result.

North by Northwest has been referred to as "the first James Bond film" because of its varied and colorful settings, focus on espionage, and elegant, daring, wisecracking leading man opposite a sinister yet charming villain. The crop-duster scene inspired a helicopter chase sequence in From Russia with Love, the second Bond film.

The film's final shot—that of the train speeding into a tunnel during a romantic embrace onboard—is a self-conscious Freudian symbol reflecting Hitchcock's sense of humor. In Hitchcock/Truffaut (pp. 107–108), he called it a "phallic symbol ... probably one of the most impudent shots I ever made".

== Influence ==
The film was very influential on the James Bond films and subsequent action-thriller films, as well as the TV series The Man from U.N.C.L.E., where Leo G. Carroll played a similar role as the head of a top secret intelligence agency.

The film's title is reported to have been the influence for the name of the popular annual live-music festival South by Southwest in Austin, Texas, started in 1987, with the name idea coming from Louis Black, editor and co-founder of the local alternative weekly The Austin Chronicle, as a play on the Hitchcock film title.

The third episode of the 14th season of Doctor Who serial "The Deadly Assassin" (1976) includes an homage to North by Northwest, when the Doctor, who like Hitchcock's hero is falsely accused of a politically motivated murder, is attacked by gunfire from a biplane piloted by one of his enemy's henchmen.

Anthony Horowitz published a spoof of the film's plot and title, South by South-East (1991), the third novel in Horowitz's Diamond Brothers series. The novel was also adapted into a six-part television series by the same name, broadcast on ITV in 1991.

The 2010 Spanish film The Last Circus pays visual homage to the Mount Rushmore scene in its climactic scene atop the Valley of the Fallen memorial near Madrid.

== Adaptations ==
North by Northwest was adapted as a stage play by Carolyn Burns. The adaptation premiered at the Melbourne Theatre Company in 2015.

Another stage adaptation, adapted and directed by Emma Rice, opened at the York Theatre Royal in March 2025 before touring the UK, ending with a run at the Alexandra Palace Theatre, London.

== See also ==
- List of films voted the best
- The Man on Lincoln's Nose, a 2000 documentary film
- "North by North Quahog", an episode of American animated sitcom Family Guy parodying the Hitchcock film
- Silver Streak, a 1976 action-comedy film with a similar tone and plot elements
- J. C. Backings, holders of the Mount Rushmore backdrop
