= List of 1967 box office number-one films in the United States =

This is a list of films which placed number one at the weekly box office in the United States during 1967.

== Number-one films ==
†	This implies the highest-grossing movie of the year.

#	Week ending	Film	Notes	Ref
1	January 4, 1967	Follow Me, Boys!	No survey published	
2	January 11, 1967	Follow Me, Boys!	Follow Me, Boys! grossed $312,000 in the key cities sampled	
3	January 18, 1967	The Bible: In the Beginning...	The Bible: In the Beginning... reached number one in its 16th week of release	
4	January 25, 1967	The Bible: In the Beginning...		
5	February 1, 1967	Doctor Zhivago	Doctor Zhivago returned to number one in its 58th week of release	
6	February 8, 1967	The Bible: In the Beginning...	The Bible: In the Beginning... returned to number one in its 19th week of release	
7	February 15, 1967	Grand Prix		
8	February 22, 1967	The Bible: In the Beginning...	The Bible: In the Beginning... returned to number one in its 21st week of release	
9	March 1, 1967	Hawaii	Hawaii returned to number one in its 20th week of release	
10	March 8, 1967	The Bible: In the Beginning...	The Bible: In the Beginning... returned to number one in its 23rd week of release	
11	March 15, 1967	The Bible: In the Beginning...		
12	March 22, 1967	How to Succeed in Business Without Really Trying		
13	March 29, 1967	How to Succeed in Business Without Really Trying	How to Succeed in Business Without Really Trying grossed nearly $500,000 in the cities sampled	
14	April 5, 1967	How to Succeed in Business Without Really Trying		
15	April 12, 1967	How to Succeed in Business Without Really Trying		
16	April 19, 1967	A Man for All Seasons		
17	April 26, 1967	A Man for All Seasons		
18	May 3, 1967	Casino Royale	Casino Royale grossed $2,148,711 for the weekend ended April 30, a record for Columbia Pictures	
19	May 10, 1967	Casino Royale		
20	May 17, 1967	Casino Royale		
21	May 24, 1967	Casino Royale		
22	May 31, 1967	Casino Royale		
23	June 7, 1967	Casino Royale		
24	June 14, 1967	Thoroughly Modern Millie		
25	June 21, 1967	Thoroughly Modern Millie		
26	June 28, 1967	You Only Live Twice	You Only Live Twice grossed $1,074,000 from 14 key cities	
27	July 5, 1967	You Only Live Twice		
28	July 12, 1967	You Only Live Twice		
29	July 19, 1967	You Only Live Twice		
30	July 26, 1967	You Only Live Twice		
31	August 2, 1967	You Only Live Twice		
32	August 9, 1967	The Dirty Dozen †		
33	August 16, 1967	Barefoot in the Park		
34	August 23, 1967	In the Heat of the Night	In the Heat of the Night reached number one in its third week of release grossing $330,000	
35	August 30, 1967	In the Heat of the Night		
36	September 6, 1967	In the Heat of the Night	In the Heat of the Night grossed more than $500,000 from 16 key cities sampled	
37	September 13, 1967	In the Heat of the Night		
38	September 20, 1967	In the Heat of the Night	In the Heat of the Night grossed nearly $300,000	
39	September 27, 1967	To Sir, with Love		
40	October 4, 1967	To Sir, with Love		
41	October 11, 1967	To Sir, with Love		
42	October 18, 1967	Reflections in a Golden Eye		
43	October 25, 1967	Reflections in a Golden Eye		
44	November 1, 1967	Gone with the Wind (reissue)	Gone with the Wind reached number one in its third week of reissue	
45	November 8, 1967	Gone with the Wind (reissue)		
46	November 15, 1967	Gone with the Wind (reissue)		
47	November 22, 1967	Gone with the Wind (reissue)		
48	November 29, 1967	Gone with the Wind (reissue)		
49	December 6, 1967	Gone with the Wind (reissue)		
50	December 13, 1967	Gone with the Wind (reissue)		
51	December 20, 1967	Gone with the Wind (reissue)		
52	December 27, 1967	Valley of the Dolls		

== Highest-grossing films ==
Rank	Title	Distributor	Rental
1	The Dirty Dozen	Metro-Goldwyn-Mayer	$18,200,000
2	You Only Live Twice	United Artists	$16,300,000
3	Casino Royale	Columbia Pictures	$10,200,000
4	A Man for All Seasons	Columbia Pictures	$9,250,000
5	Thoroughly Modern Millie	Universal Pictures	$8,500,000
6	Barefoot in the Park	Paramount Pictures	$8,250,000
7	Georgy Girl	Columbia Pictures	$7,330,000
8	To Sir, with Love	Columbia Pictures	$7,200,000
9	Grand Prix	Metro-Goldwyn-Mayer	$7,000,000
10	Hombre	20th Century Fox	$6,500,000

== See also ==
- List of American films — American films by year
- Lists of box office number-one films

== Chronology ==
Preceded by 1966	1967	Succeeded by 1968
