= List of 1965 box office number-one films in the United States =

This is a list of films which placed number one at the weekly box office in the United States during 1965.

== Number-one films ==
Mary Poppins became the highest-grossing film of 1965. But its reign at the #1 spot occurred in late 1964, it never reached #1 during 1965.

#	Week ending	Film	Notes	Ref
1	January 6, 1965	Goldfinger		
2	January 13, 1965	Goldfinger	Goldfinger grossed over $700,000 in the cities sampled	
3	January 20, 1965	Goldfinger	Goldfinger grossed $580,000 from 19 key cities	
4	January 27, 1965	Goldfinger	Goldfinger grossed $500,000 from the cities sampled	
5	February 3, 1965	Goldfinger	Goldfinger grossed $580,000 from 19 key cities	
6	February 10, 1965	Goldfinger	Goldfinger grossed $470,000 from the cities sampled	
7	February 17, 1965	My Fair Lady	My Fair Lady returned to number one in its 17th week of release	
8	February 24, 1965	My Fair Lady		
9	March 3, 1965	My Fair Lady		
10	March 10, 1965	My Fair Lady		
11	March 17, 1965	My Fair Lady		
12	March 24, 1965	My Fair Lady		
13	March 31, 1965	My Fair Lady		
14	April 7, 1965	The Sound of Music	The Sound of Music reached number one in its fifth week of release	
15	April 14, 1965	The Sound of Music		
16	April 21, 1965	My Fair Lady	My Fair Lady returned to number one in its 26th week of release	
17	April 28, 1965	The Sound of Music	The Sound of Music returned to number one in its eighth week of release	
18	May 5, 1965	The Sound of Music		
19	May 12, 1965	The Sound of Music		
20	May 19, 1965	The Sound of Music		
21	May 26, 1965	The Sound of Music		
22	June 2, 1965	The Sound of Music		
23	June 9, 1965	The Sound of Music		
24	June 16, 1965	The Sound of Music		
25	June 23, 1965	The Yellow Rolls-Royce		
26	June 30, 1965	The Yellow Rolls-Royce		
27	July 7, 1965	What's New Pussycat?	What's New Pussycat? reached number one in its second week of release	
28	July 14, 1965	What's New Pussycat?		
29	July 21, 1965	The Sound of Music	The Sound of Music returned to number one in its 20th week of release	
30	July 28, 1965	The Sandpiper	The Sandpiper reached number one in its fifth week of release	
31	August 4, 1965	The Sandpiper		
32	August 11, 1965	The Sound of Music	The Sound of Music returned to number one in its 23rd week of release	
33	August 18, 1965	The Sound of Music	The Sound of Music grossed close to $500,000 in the cities sampled	
34	August 25, 1965	The Sound of Music		
35	September 1, 1965	The Sound of Music		
36	September 8, 1965	The Sound of Music		
37	September 15, 1965	The Sound of Music		
38	September 22, 1965	The Sound of Music		
39	September 29, 1965	The Sound of Music		
40	October 6, 1965	The Sound of Music		
41	October 13, 1965	The Sound of Music		
42	October 20, 1965	The Great Race		
43	October 27, 1965	The Great Race		
44	November 3, 1965	The Sound of Music	The Sound of Music returned to number one in its 35th week of release	
45	November 10, 1965	The Sound of Music		
46	November 17, 1965	The Sound of Music		
47	November 24, 1965	The Sound of Music		
48	December 1, 1965	The Sound of Music		
49	December 8, 1965	The Sound of Music		
50	December 15, 1965	The Sound of Music		
51	December 22, 1965	The Sound of Music		
52	December 29, 1965	Thunderball	Thunderball grossed over $1.4 million in the key cities sampled	

== Highest-grossing films ==
The highest-grossing films during the calendar year based on theatrical rentals were as follows:

Rank	Title	Distributor	Rental
1	Mary Poppins	Buena Vista	$26,500,000
2	The Sound of Music	20th Century Fox	$20,000,000
3	Goldfinger	United Artists	$19,700,000
4	My Fair Lady	Warner Bros.	$14,000,000
5	It's a Mad, Mad, Mad, Mad World	United Artists	$7,500,000
6	What's New Pussycat?	United Artists	$7,150,000
7	Shenandoah	Universal Pictures	$7,000,000
8	The Sandpiper	Metro-Goldwyn-Mayer	$6,400,000
9	Father Goose	Universal Pictures	$6,000,000
10	Von Ryan's Express	20th Century Fox	$5,600,000

== See also ==
- List of American films — American films by year
- Lists of box office number-one films

== Chronology ==
Preceded by 1964	1965	Succeeded by 1966
