= List of 1966 box office number-one films in the United States =

This is a list of films which placed number one at the weekly box office in the United States during 1966.

== Number-one films ==
†	This implies the highest-grossing movie of the year.

#	Week ending	Film	Notes	Ref
1	January 5, 1966	Thunderball †		
2	January 12, 1966	Thunderball †	Thunderball grossed over $1.2 million in the key cities sampled	
3	January 19, 1966	Thunderball †		
4	January 26, 1966	Thunderball †		
5	February 2, 1966	Thunderball †		
6	February 9, 1966	Thunderball †		
7	February 16, 1966	Thunderball †		
8	February 23, 1966	Thunderball †		
9	March 2, 1966	The Sound of Music	The Sound of Music returned to number one in its 52nd week of release	
10	March 9, 1966	The Sound of Music		
11	March 16, 1966	The Sound of Music		
12	March 23, 1966	The Sound of Music		
13	March 30, 1966	The Sound of Music		
14	April 6, 1966	Doctor Zhivago	Doctor Zhivago reached number one in its 15th week of release	
15	April 13, 1966	Doctor Zhivago		
16	April 20, 1966	Doctor Zhivago		
17	April 27, 1966	The Sound of Music	The Sound of Music returned to number one in its 60th week of release	
18	May 4, 1966	Doctor Zhivago	Doctor Zhivago returned to number one in its 19th week of release	
19	May 11, 1966	The Sound of Music	The Sound of Music returned to number one in its 62nd week of release	
20	May 18, 1966	Doctor Zhivago	Doctor Zhivago returned to number one in its 21st week of release	
21	May 25, 1966	The Sound of Music	The Sound of Music returned to number one in its 64th week of release	
22	June 1, 1966	The Sound of Music		
23	June 8, 1966	Doctor Zhivago	Doctor Zhivago returned to number one in its 24th week of release	
24	June 15, 1966	The Sound of Music	The Sound of Music returned to number one in its 67th week of release	
25	June 22, 1966	The Sound of Music		
26	June 29, 1966	The Russians Are Coming, the Russians Are Coming		
27	July 6, 1966	Who's Afraid of Virginia Woolf?		
28	July 13, 1966	Who's Afraid of Virginia Woolf?		
29	July 20, 1966	Who's Afraid of Virginia Woolf?		
30	July 27, 1966	Who's Afraid of Virginia Woolf?		
31	August 3, 1966	Who's Afraid of Virginia Woolf?		
32	August 10, 1966	Who's Afraid of Virginia Woolf?		
33	August 17, 1966	Who's Afraid of Virginia Woolf?		
34	August 24, 1966	Who's Afraid of Virginia Woolf?		
35	August 31, 1966	How to Steal a Million		
36	September 7, 1966	How to Steal a Million		
37	September 14, 1966	The Sound of Music	The Sound of Music returned to number one in its 80th week of release	
38	September 21, 1966	Doctor Zhivago	Doctor Zhivago returned to number one in its 39th week of release	
39	September 28, 1966	Doctor Zhivago		
40	October 5, 1966	Doctor Zhivago		
41	October 12, 1966	Doctor Zhivago		
42	October 19, 1966	Doctor Zhivago		
43	October 26, 1966	Doctor Zhivago		
44	November 2, 1966	Hawaii	Hawaii reached number one in its third week of release	
45	November 9, 1966	Hawaii		
46	November 16, 1966	The Professionals		
47	November 23, 1966	The Professionals and Hawaii	Variety did not indicate which of the top two films was number one for the week	
48	November 30, 1966	The Professionals		
49	December 7, 1966	The Professionals		
50	December 14, 1966	The Professionals		
51	December 21, 1966	Hawaii and The Professionals	Again, Variety did not indicate which of the top two films was number one for the week	
52	December 28, 1966	Follow Me, Boys!		

== Highest-grossing films ==
The highest-grossing films during the calendar year based on theatrical rentals were as follows:

Rank	Title	Distributor	Rental
1	Thunderball	United Artists	$26,000,000
2	The Sound of Music	20th Century Fox	$22,500,000
3	Doctor Zhivago	Metro-Goldwyn-Mayer	$15,000,000
4	Who's Afraid of Virginia Woolf?	Warner Bros.	$10,300,000
5	That Darn Cat!	Buena Vista	$9,200,000
6	The Russians Are Coming, The Russians Are Coming	United Artists	$7,750,000
7	Lt. Robin Crusoe, U.S.N.	Buena Vista	$7,500,000
8	The Silencers	Columbia Pictures	$7,000,000
8	Torn Curtain	Universal Pictures	$7,000,000
10	Our Man Flint	20th Century Fox	$6,500,000

== See also ==
- List of American films — American films by year
- Lists of box office number-one films

== Chronology ==
Preceded by 1965	1966	Succeeded by 1967
