= List of 1961 box office number-one films in the United States =

This is a list of films which placed number one at the weekly box office in the United States during 1961.

== Number-one films ==
Ben-Hur became the highest grossing film of 1961, as had happened the year before. But its reign at the #1 spot was the majority of 1960, it never reached #1 during 1961.

#	Week ending	Film	Notes	Ref
1	January 4, 1961	Spartacus	Spartacus reached number one in its 13th week of release	
2	January 11, 1961	Spartacus		
3	January 18, 1961	Exodus		
4	January 25, 1961	Spartacus	Spartacus returned to number one in its 16th week of release	
5	February 1, 1961	Swiss Family Robinson	Swiss Family Robinson grossed $265,000 in the key cities sampled	
6	February 8, 1961	The Misfits		
7	February 15, 1961	Exodus		
8	February 22, 1961	The Misfits		
9	March 1, 1961	Exodus		
10	March 8, 1961	Exodus		
11	March 15, 1961	Exodus		
12	March 22, 1961	Exodus	Although Variety listed Exodus as the champ for the week based on their cities sampled, it noted that The Alamo likely grossed more nationally.	
13	March 29, 1961	Exodus		
14	April 5, 1961	Exodus		
15	April 12, 1961	Exodus		
16	April 19, 1961	The Absent-Minded Professor		
17	April 26, 1961	The Absent-Minded Professor		
18	May 3, 1961	The Absent-Minded Professor		
19	May 10, 1961	Gone with the Wind (reissue)	Gone with the Wind grossed $250,000 from 17 key cities.	
20	May 17, 1961	The Absent-Minded Professor		
21	May 24, 1961	Gone with the Wind (reissue)		
22	May 31, 1961	The Young Savages	The Young Savages grossed around $300,000 from 18 key cities.	
23	June 7, 1961	The Pleasure of His Company		
24	June 14, 1961	The Pleasure of His Company		
25	June 21, 1961	The Pleasure of His Company		
26	June 28, 1961	The Pleasure of His Company		
27	July 5, 1961	The Parent Trap		
28	July 12, 1961	Fanny	Fanny opened at Radio City Music Hall where it grossed over $200,000.	
29	July 19, 1961	Fanny		
30	July 26, 1961	Fanny	Fanny was still grossing $200,000 at Radio City Music Hall	
31	August 2, 1961	The Guns of Navarone		
32	August 9, 1961	The Guns of Navarone		
33	August 16, 1961	The Guns of Navarone		
34	August 23, 1961	The Guns of Navarone		
35	August 30, 1961	Come September		
36	September 6, 1961	Come September		
37	September 13, 1961	Come September		
38	September 20, 1961	Come September		
39	September 27, 1961	Come September		
40	October 4, 1961	Come September		
41	October 11, 1961	The Hustler	The Hustler grossed over $200,000 from 11 key cities	
42	October 18, 1961	Breakfast at Tiffany's	Breakfast at Tiffany's reached number one despite playing in only 5 key cities	
43	October 25, 1961	Breakfast at Tiffany's		
44	November 1, 1961	Breakfast at Tiffany's		
45	November 8, 1961	Breakfast at Tiffany's		
46	November 15, 1961	Breakfast at Tiffany's		
47	November 22, 1961	King of Kings		
48	November 29, 1961	The Comancheros	The Comancheros grossed nearly $300,000 from 21 key cities	
49	December 6, 1961	King of Kings		
50	December 13, 1961	King of Kings		
51	December 20, 1961	West Side Story		
52	December 27, 1961	Flower Drum Song		

== Highest-grossing films ==
The highest-grossing films during the calendar year based on theatrical rentals were as follows:

Rank	Title	Distributor	Rental
1	Ben-Hur	Metro-Goldwyn-Mayer	$14,700,000
2	The Guns of Navarone	Columbia Pictures	$8,600,000
3	The Absent-Minded Professor	Buena Vista	$8,200,000
4	The Parent Trap	Buena Vista	$8,000,000
5	Swiss Family Robinson	Buena Vista	$7,500,000
6	Exodus	United Artists	$7,350,000
7	The World of Suzie Wong	Paramount Pictures	$7,300,000
8	The Alamo	United Artists	$7,250,000
9	Gone with the Wind	Metro-Goldwyn-Mayer	$6,000,000
10	One Hundred and One Dalmatians	Buena Vista	$5,800,000

== See also ==
- List of American films — American films by year
- Lists of box office number-one films

== Chronology ==
Preceded by 1960	1961	Succeeded by 1962
