= List of 1959 box office number-one films in the United States =

This is a list of films which placed number one at the weekly box office in the United States during 1959.

== Number-one films ==
†	This implies the highest-grossing movie of the year.

#	Week ending	Film	Notes	Ref
1	January 7, 1959	The Buccaneer	No survey was published this week, however The Buccaneer was #1 the previous week.	
2	January 14, 1959	Auntie Mame †	Auntie Mame grossed $380,000 from 19 key cities sampled	
3	January 21, 1959	Auntie Mame †	Auntie Mame grossed $355,000 from the cities sampled	
4	January 28, 1959	Some Came Running		
5	February 4, 1959	Auntie Mame †		
6	February 11, 1959	Auntie Mame †		
7	February 18, 1959	Separate Tables		
8	February 25, 1959	Sleeping Beauty		
9	March 4, 1959	Separate Tables		
10	March 11, 1959	Sleeping Beauty		
11	March 18, 1959	Sleeping Beauty		
12	March 25, 1959	Rio Bravo		
13	April 1, 1959	Some Like It Hot	Some Like It Hot reached number one in its second week of release	
14	April 8, 1959	Some Like It Hot		
15	April 15, 1959	Some Like It Hot		
16	April 22, 1959	Imitation of Life	Imitation of Life reached number one in its fifth week of release	
17	April 29, 1959	Imitation of Life		
18	May 6, 1959	Some Like It Hot	Some Like It Hot returned to number one in its seventh week of release with a gross of around $280,000	
19	May 13, 1959	Some Like It Hot		
20	May 20, 1959	Some Like It Hot		
21	May 27, 1959	Some Like It Hot		
22	June 3, 1959	Pork Chop Hill		
23	June 10, 1959	The Young Philadelphians		
24	June 17, 1959	Ask Any Girl	Ask Any Girl reached number one in its second week of release	
25	June 24, 1959	Say One for Me		
26	July 1, 1959	The Horse Soldiers		
27	July 8, 1959	The Nun's Story		
28	July 15, 1959	The Nun's Story		
29	July 22, 1959	A Hole in the Head		
30	July 29, 1959	The Nun's Story	The Nun's Story grossed more than $300,000 in the cities sampled	
31	August 5, 1959	Anatomy of a Murder		
32	August 12, 1959	North by Northwest		
33	August 19, 1959	North by Northwest		
34	August 26, 1959	North by Northwest		
35	September 2, 1959	North by Northwest		
36	September 9, 1959	North by Northwest		
37	September 16, 1959	North by Northwest		
38	September 23, 1959	North by Northwest		
39	September 30, 1959	That Kind of Woman		
40	October 7, 1959	But Not for Me		
41	October 14, 1959	The FBI Story		
42	October 21, 1959	Pillow Talk	Pillow Talk reached number one in its second week of release	
43	October 28, 1959	Pillow Talk		
44	November 4, 1959	Pillow Talk	Pillow Talk grossed more than $275,000 in the key cities sampled	
45	November 11, 1959	Pillow Talk		
46	November 18, 1959	Pillow Talk		
47	November 25, 1959	Pillow Talk		
48	December 2, 1959	A Summer Place		
49	December 9, 1959	A Summer Place		
50	December 16, 1959	Pillow Talk	Pillow Talk returned to number one in its tenth week of release	
51	December 23, 1959	On the Beach	On the Beach grossed over $200,000 from five key cities sampled	
52	December 30, 1959	Solomon and Sheba	No survey published. But Solomon and Sheba was the December champion based on grosses from its release in the last week of the year.	

== Highest-grossing films ==
The highest-grossing films during the calendar year based on theatrical rentals were as follows:

Rank	Title	Distributor	Rental
1	Auntie Mame	Warner Bros.	$8,800,000
2	The Shaggy Dog	Buena Vista	$7,800,000
3	Some Like It Hot	United Artists	$7,000,000
4	Imitation of Life	Universal Pictures	$6,200,000
5	The Nun's Story	Warner Bros.	$6,000,000
6	Anatomy of a Murder	Columbia Pictures	$5,250,000
6	North by Northwest	Metro-Goldwyn-Mayer	$5,250,000
8	Rio Bravo	Warner Bros.	$5,100,000
9	Around the World in 80 Days	United Artists	$4,400,000
10	Sleeping Beauty	Buena Vista	$4,300,000

== See also ==
- Lists of American films — American films by year
- Lists of box office number-one films

== Chronology ==
Preceded by 1958	1959	Succeeded by 1960
