= The Man on Lincoln's Nose =

2000 film

- Directed by: Daniel Raim
- Written by: Gill Dennis; Daniel Raim
- Produced by: Jon Biddle; Emily Boyle; Patricia Hitchcock; Lawrence A. Mirisch; Daniel Raim
- Cinematography: Daniel Raim; Guido Verweyen; Haskell Wexler
- Edited by: Stephen Mark
- Production company: Adama Films
- Release date: October 20, 2000
- Country: United States
- Language: English

The Man on Lincoln's Nose is a 2000 American short documentary film directed by Daniel Raim about Hollywood art director Robert F. Boyle. It was nominated for an Academy Award for Best Documentary Short. The title is derived from the Alfred Hitchcock film North by Northwest (1959), which has a climactic scene of two characters dangling from the carving of Abraham Lincoln's face on Mount Rushmore. One of the producers was Hitchcock's daughter, Patricia Hitchcock.

== Cast ==
- James D. Bissell as himself
- Robert F. Boyle as himself
- Henry Bumstead as himself
- Norman Jewison as himself
- Harold Michelson as himself
- Walter Mirisch as himself
- Albert Nozaki as himself

== Awards and nominations ==
Incomplete list of awards for The Man on Lincoln's Nose
Year	Award	Category	Result
2000	73rd Academy Awards	Best Documentary Short Subject	Nominated

== See also ==
- List of documentary films
- List of American films of 2000
