= List of 1962 box office number-one films in the United States =

This is a list of films which placed number one at the weekly box office in the United States during 1962.

== Number-one films ==
Spartacus became the highest grossing film of 1962. But its reign at the #1 spot was at the beginning of 1961, it never reached #1 during 1962.

#	Week ending	Film	Notes	Ref
1	January 3, 1962	Babes in Toyland		
2	January 10, 1962	Flower Drum Song		
3	January 17, 1962	Flower Drum Song		
4	January 24, 1962	Flower Drum Song		
5	January 31, 1962	One, Two, Three		
6	February 7, 1962	One, Two, Three		
7	February 14, 1962	One, Two, Three	No survey was published this week, but One, Two, Three was #1 the previous week.	
8	February 21, 1962	Lover Come Back	Lover Come Back grossed more than $500,000 in 19 key cities	
9	February 28, 1962	Lover Come Back	Lover Come Back grossed more than $440,000 in 19 key cities	
10	March 7, 1962	Lover Come Back		
11	March 14, 1962	Lover Come Back		
12	March 21, 1962	Lover Come Back		
13	March 28, 1962	West Side Story		
14	April 4, 1962	West Side Story		
15	April 11, 1962	West Side Story		
16	April 18, 1962	West Side Story		
17	April 25, 1962	Moon Pilot	Moon Pilot, together with an Easter Disneyland USA stageshow, grossed a record $230,000 at Radio City Music Hall	
18	May 2, 1962	West Side Story		
19	May 9, 1962	West Side Story		
20	May 16, 1962	West Side Story		
21	May 23, 1962	West Side Story		
22	May 30, 1962	West Side Story		
23	June 6, 1962	West Side Story		
24	June 13, 1962	West Side Story		
25	June 20, 1962	West Side Story		
26	June 27, 1962	That Touch of Mink	That Touch of Mink grossed nearly $450,000 from 17 engagements	
27	July 4, 1962	That Touch of Mink	That Touch of Mink grossed $450,000 from 18 key cities	
28	July 11, 1962	That Touch of Mink		
29	July 18, 1962	That Touch of Mink		
30	July 25, 1962	That Touch of Mink	That Touch of Mink grossed $400,000 from 18 key cities	
31	August 1, 1962	The Music Man		
32	August 8, 1962	That Touch of Mink		
33	August 15, 1962	That Touch of Mink		
34	August 22, 1962	The Wonderful World of the Brothers Grimm	The Wonderful World of the Brothers Grimm reached number one in its second week of release	
35	August 29, 1962	The Music Man		
36	September 5, 1962	The Music Man		
37	September 12, 1962	The Music Man		
38	September 19, 1962	The Music Man		
39	September 26, 1962	The Music Man		
40	October 3, 1962	The Wonderful World of the Brothers Grimm	The Wonderful World of the Brothers Grimm returned to number one in its eighth week of release	
41	October 10, 1962	The Wonderful World of the Brothers Grimm		
42	October 17, 1962	The Wonderful World of the Brothers Grimm		
43	October 24, 1962	The Longest Day		
44	October 31, 1962	The Longest Day		
45	November 7, 1962	The Manchurian Candidate		
46	November 14, 1962	The Longest Day		
47	November 21, 1962	The Longest Day		
48	November 28, 1962	The Wonderful World of the Brothers Grimm		
49	December 5, 1962	Mutiny on the Bounty		
50	December 12, 1962	Mutiny on the Bounty		
51	December 19, 1962	Mutiny on the Bounty		
52	December 26, 1962	Mutiny on the Bounty	No survey was published this week, but Mutiny on the Bounty was #1 the previous week.	

== Highest-grossing films ==
The highest-grossing films during the calendar year based on theatrical rentals were as follows:

Rank	Title	Distributor	Rental
1	Spartacus	Universal Pictures	$13,500,000
2	West Side Story	United Artists	$11,000,000
3	Lover Come Back	Universal Pictures	$8,500,000
3	That Touch of Mink	Universal Pictures	$8,500,000
5	El Cid	Allied Artists	$8,000,000
5	The Music Man	Warner Bros.	$8,000,000
7	King of Kings	Metro-Goldwyn-Mayer	$7,500,000
8	Hatari!	Paramount Pictures	$6,000,000
9	Flower Drum Song	Universal Pictures	$5,000,000
9	The Interns	Columbia Pictures	$5,000,000

== See also ==
- List of American films — American films by year
- Lists of box office number-one films

== Chronology ==
Preceded by 1961	1962	Succeeded by 1963
