= Winning (film) =

1969 film by James Goldstone

- Directed by: James Goldstone
- Written by: Howard Rodman
- Produced by: John Foreman
- Starring: Paul Newman; Joanne Woodward; Robert Wagner
- Cinematography: Richard Moore
- Edited by: Edward A. Biery; Richard C. Meyer
- Music by: Dave Grusin
- Color process: Technicolor
- Production companies: Newman-Foreman Company; Jennings Lang
- Distributed by: Universal Pictures
- Release dates: May 17, 1969 (Chicago); June 16, 1969 (United States)
- Running time: 123 minutes
- Country: United States
- Language: English
- Box office: $14.6 million (US/Canada)

Winning is a 1969 American Panavision action drama sports film directed by James Goldstone and starring Paul Newman, Joanne Woodward and Robert Wagner. The film is about a race car driver who aspires to win the Indianapolis 500. A number of race car drivers and people associated with racing appear in the film, including Bobby Unser, Tony Hulman, Bobby Grim, Dan Gurney, Roger McCluskey, and Bruce Walkup.

== Plot ==
Professional race car driver Frank Capua meets divorcee Elora. After a whirlwind romance they are married. Charley, Elora's teenage son by her first husband, becomes very close to Frank, and helps him prepare his cars for his races. But Frank is so dedicated to his career that he neglects his wife, who has an affair with Frank's teammate and main rival on the race track, Luther Erding. Frank finds them in bed together and storms out. The couple separate, but Frank still sees Charley regularly. Frank's bitterness fuels his dedication to his work, and he becomes a much more aggressive driver. At the Indianapolis 500, Elora and Charley watch while Frank drives the race of his life and wins. After winning, Frank attends a victory party. He is uninterested when attractive women throw themselves at him, and he slips away. Luther finds Frank and apologizes to him for the affair, but Frank punches him. Frank visits Elora and tells her he wants to start again. Elora is unsure. The film ends with a freeze-frame as the two look uncertainly at each other.

== Cast ==
- Paul Newman as Frank Capua
- Joanne Woodward as Elora Capua
- Robert Wagner as Luther "Lou" Erding
- Richard Thomas as Charley Capua
- David Sheiner as Leo Crawford
- Clu Gulager as Larry, The Mechanic
- Barry Ford as Les Bottineau
- Karen Arthur as Miss Dairy Queen
- Bobby Unser as Himself
- Tony Hulman as Himself
- Bobby Grim as Himself
- Dan Gurney as Himself
- Roger McCluskey as Himself
- Bruce Walkup as Himself

== Production ==
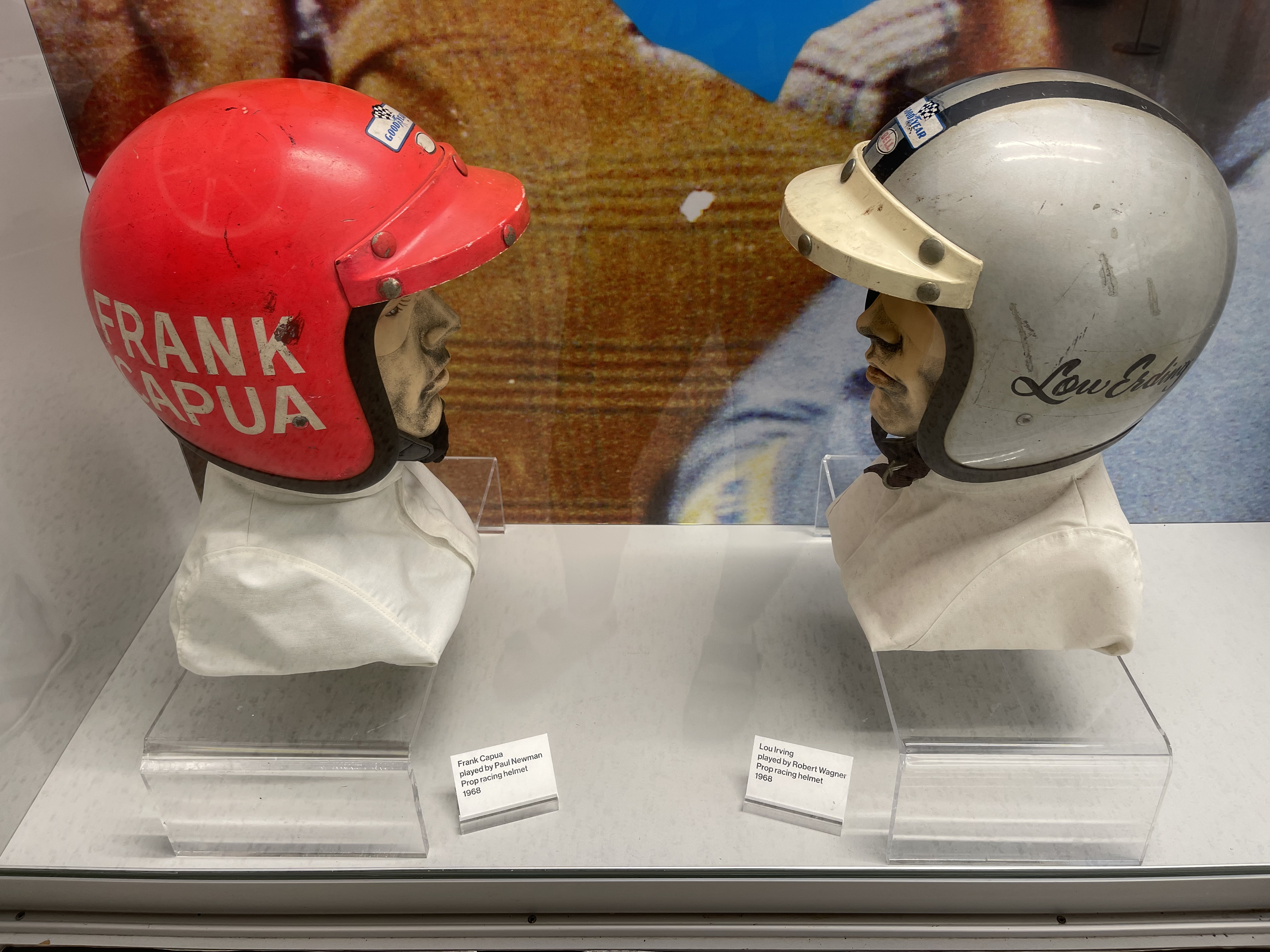
Helmets worn in the film by Paul Newman and Robert Wagner on display at the Indianapolis Motor Speedway Museum.

During preparation for this film, Newman was trained for the motorsport by drivers Bob Sharp and Lake Underwood, at a race track high performance driving school—which sparked Newman's enthusiasm for the sport and led to his participation as a competitor in sports car racing during the remainder of his life. He would eventually launch the much successful Newman/Haas Racing with his longtime racing competitor and friend Carl Haas, winning more than 100 races and 8 Driver's Championships in IndyCar Series, although ironically the team never won the 500.

The film includes footage taken at the Indianapolis Motor Speedway, the legendary 2.5 mile track. Most of the footage is from the 1968 race. The accident during the first green flag is from the 1966 race.

Other scenes were shot at Road America, Riverside International Raceway, and Indianapolis Raceway Park.

== Release ==
The film opened on May 17, 1969, at the Chicago Theatre in Chicago.

== Reception ==
=== Box office ===
The film grossed $55,000 in its opening week at the Chicago Theatre. The release expanded the following week and became number one in the United States. It was knocked off the top spot by The Killing of Sister George but was second place for two weeks before it returned to the top spot. It went on to earn $6.2 million in rentals in the United States and Canada from an estimated gross of $14.6 million, which ranked as the 16th most popular film at the US box office that year.

=== Critical ===
Vincent Canby included the movie in his New York Times list of "ten worst films of 1969": "It's bad enough when Hollywood moviemakers try to imitate good European films, and worse when they give homage to poor ones, like the financially successful 'A Man and a Woman.' Take 'A Man and a Woman' out of 'Winning' and you've got Richard Arlen at the Indianapolis Speedway, circa 1937."

Quentin Tarantino, when asked about his favorite race car films, was not a fan of Winning. "I'd rather saw my fingers off than sit through that again," he said.

== Soundtrack ==
The film score was by Dave Grusin, and the original soundtrack album was issued on Decca Records. The opening moments of the film's theme, "500 Miles," was used by WEWS-TV in Cleveland in the 1970s and 1980s as the theme for their Million Dollar Movie. The movie's opening theme was used in the early 1970s in TVG's American syndicated college basketball network's telecasts.

== See also ==
- List of American films of 1969
