= List of 1964 box office number-one films in the United States =

This is a list of films which placed number one at the weekly box office in the United States during 1964.

== Number-one films ==
†	This implies the highest-grossing movie of the year.

#	Week ending	Film	Notes	Ref
1	January 1, 1964	Charade	Charade grossed over $550,000	
2	January 8, 1964	Charade		
3	January 15, 1964	Charade	Charade grossed $360,000 from 19 key cities	
4	January 22, 1964	Charade	Charade grossed more than $350,000 from 22 key cities	
5	January 29, 1964	Charade		
6	February 5, 1964	The Prize		
7	February 12, 1964	Tom Jones		
8	February 19, 1964	Tom Jones		
9	February 26, 1964	It's a Mad, Mad, Mad, Mad World		
10	March 4, 1964	Tom Jones		
11	March 11, 1964	Tom Jones		
12	March 18, 1964	It's a Mad, Mad, Mad, Mad World		
13	March 25, 1964	Tom Jones		
14	April 1, 1964	It's a Mad, Mad, Mad, Mad World		
15	April 8, 1964	It's a Mad, Mad, Mad, Mad World		
16	April 15, 1964	Tom Jones		
17	April 22, 1964	Tom Jones		
18	April 29, 1964	The Pink Panther	The Pink Panther reached number one in its sixth week of release	
19	May 6, 1964	The Pink Panther		
20	May 13, 1964	The Pink Panther		
21	May 20, 1964	The Pink Panther		
22	May 27, 1964	What a Way to Go!	What a Way to Go! reached number one in its second week of release	
23	June 3, 1964	The Chalk Garden	The Chalk Garden grossed $180,000 at Radio City Music Hall, a Memorial Day week record	
24	June 10, 1964	The Pink Panther	The Pink Panther returned to number one in its twelfth week of release	
25	June 17, 1964	The Carpetbaggers †		
26	June 24, 1964	The Carpetbaggers †		
27	July 1, 1964	The Carpetbaggers †		
28	July 8, 1964	The Carpetbaggers †	The Carpetbaggers grossed $434,000	
29	July 15, 1964	The Carpetbaggers †		
30	July 22, 1964	The Unsinkable Molly Brown		
31	July 29, 1964	The Carpetbaggers †		
32	August 5, 1964	The Unsinkable Molly Brown		
33	August 12, 1964	The Night of the Iguana		
34	August 19, 1964	The Unsinkable Molly Brown		
35	August 26, 1964	The Unsinkable Molly Brown		
36	September 2, 1964	The Unsinkable Molly Brown		
37	September 9, 1964	The Unsinkable Molly Brown		
38	September 16, 1964	The Unsinkable Molly Brown		
39	September 23, 1964	The Unsinkable Molly Brown		
40	September 30, 1964	A Shot in the Dark		
41	October 7, 1964	A Shot in the Dark		
42	October 14, 1964	A Shot in the Dark		
43	October 21, 1964	Topkapi		
44	October 28, 1964	Mary Poppins		
45	November 4, 1964	My Fair Lady	My Fair Lady reached number one in its second week of release	
46	November 11, 1964	Mary Poppins		
47	November 18, 1964	My Fair Lady	My Fair Lady returned to number one in its fourth week of release	
48	November 25, 1964	My Fair Lady		
49	December 2, 1964	My Fair Lady		
50	December 9, 1964	My Fair Lady		
51	December 16, 1964	My Fair Lady		
52	December 23, 1964	My Fair Lady		
53	December 30, 1964	Goldfinger	Goldfinger grossed $632,000 in the cities sampled	

== Highest-grossing films ==
The highest-grossing films during the calendar year based on theatrical rentals were as follows:

Rank	Title	Distributor	Rental
1	The Carpetbaggers	Paramount Pictures	$13,000,000
2	It's a Mad, Mad, Mad, Mad World	United Artists	$10,000,000
3	The Unsinkable Molly Brown	Metro-Goldwyn-Mayer	$7,500,000
4	Charade	Universal Pictures	$6,150,000
5	Cleopatra	20th Century Fox	$5,500,000
6	The Cardinal	Columbia Pictures	$5,275,000
7	Move Over, Darling	20th Century Fox	$5,100,000
8	My Fair Lady	Warner Bros.	$5,000,000
8	What a Way to Go!	20th Century Fox	$5,000,000
10	Good Neighbor Sam	Columbia Pictures	$4,950,000

== See also ==
- List of American films — American films by year
- Lists of box office number-one films

== Chronology ==
Preceded by 1963	1964	Succeeded by 1965
