= Don't Call Me Charlie! =

- Genre: Situation comedy
- Created by: Don McGuire
- Written by: Don McGuire
- Directed by: Don McGuire; Joseph Depew
- Starring: Josh Peine; Linda Lawson; John Hubbard; Arte Johnson; Penny Santon; Cully Richards; Louise Glenn; Alan Napier
- Composer: Jack Marshall
- Country of origin: United States
- Original language: English
- No. of seasons: 1
- No. of episodes: 26 (8 unaired)

Production
- Producer: Don McGuire
- Running time: 30 mins. (approx)
- Production companies: McGuire Company, Inc.

Original release
- Network: NBC
- Release: September 21, 1962 – January 25, 1963

Josh Peine as Judson McKay in a publicity photo for Don't Call Me Charlie!

Don't Call Me Charlie! is an American sitcom that aired on NBC during the 1962-1963 television season on Friday nights from 9:30 pm to 10:00 pm Eastern Time. Created by Don McGuire, the 18-episode series starred Josh Peine, Linda Lawson, John Hubbard, Arte Johnson, Penny Santon, Cully Richards, Louise Glenn, and Alan Napier.

== Synopsis ==
Dr. Judson McKay (Josh Peine) is a small-town veterinarian from Muscatine, Iowa, who suddenly gets drafted into the United States Army and finds himself stationed as a private at an Army veterinary post in Paris. Upon arriving, Judson finds that the officer in charge of his post, Colonel U. Charles Barker (John Hubbard), had requested a bandmaster who played the trombone to be sent to the unit, but due to a clerical error Judson had been assigned to Barker instead.

Judson′s fellow soldiers attempt to get him to change his small-town ways, but he refuses to let the sophistication of Europe change him. Misadventures ensue as he tries to remain the simple country boy he had been in Muscatine, often leading to conflicts with Colonel Barker. Among the soldiers Judson serves with in addition to Colonel Barker are First Sergeant Stanley Wozniak (Cully Richard) and Corporal Lefkowitz (Arte Johnson). General Steele (Alan Napier) is Colonel Barker′s superior officer. Patricia Perry (Linda Lawson) is General Steele′s secretary, Selma Yossarian (Louise Glenn) is Colonel Barker′s secretary, and Madame Fatime (Penny Santon) is the concierge.

The Army veterinary station sees little action, and Colonel Barker has a lot of free time. Barker is pompous, but friendly with the troops under his command and loves to play gin rummy. Barker hates to be called "Charlie" and often tells people, "Don't call me Charlie!".

== Cast ==
- Josh Peine as Judson McKay, D.V.M.
- Louise Glenn as Selma Yossarian
- John Hubbard as Colonel U. Charles Barker
- Arte Johnson as Corporal Lefkowitz
- Linda Lawson as Pat Perry
- Alan Napier as General Steele
- Cully Richards as First Sergeant Stanley Wozniak
- Penny Santon as Madame Fatime

== Production ==
The series originally was titled Vive Judson McKay! after its main character, but advance surveys taken of visitors to the Empire State Building purportedly showed that potential viewers were confused by the title, and many thought it was going to be an adventure series, such as a series about a Mexican revolutionary. The title was changed to Don't Call Me Charlie!

Don McGuire, who previously had created, co-produced, directed, and written scripts for the 1959–1962 military comedy-drama series Hennesey, also created, produced, directed, and wrote for Don't Call Me Charlie! and guest-starred in the 1962 episode "Play It, Sam." Frank Inn trained the many animals used in Don′t Call Me Charlie!

== Reception ==
Just after Don't Call Me Charlie!′s eighth episode was broadcast in mid-November 1962, United Press International distributed a scathing review of the series by critic Rick Du Brow titled "Don't Call It Comedy." Describing the show as "daringly billed as comedy," a "catastrophe," and "a witless, amateurish abortion," Du Brow asserted that "anyone who comes in contact with Don′t Call Me Charlie! is bound to suffer," that it "putrefies the public property that is the airwaves," and that it would be best if the show were "removed from the air instantly." Du Brow wrote that "of the writing, directing, and acting, there is much to say, but none of it fit for print." He described Peine′s portrayal of Judson McKay as "stiff and high-schoolish" and claimed that the show′s creators realized it and had moved toward making John Hubbard′s Colonel Barker character the show′s star as a result. Du Brow also wondered why the series was set in Paris when no depiction whatsoever of Paris occurred in its episodes, speculating that the worsening reputation of Charles de Gaulle at the time had prompted producers to minimize references to modern-day France.

== Broadcast history ==
Don′t Call Me Charlie! premiered on NBC on September 21, 1962. Its last original episode aired on January 25, 1963. Of the 26 episodes filmed, only 18 were broadcast.

== Episodes ==
| No. | Title | Directed by | Written by | Original release date |
|---|---|---|---|---|
| 1 | "Vive Judson McKay!" | Unknown | Unknown | September 21, 1962 |
Small-town Iowa veterinarian Judson McKay is drafted into the United States Army and whisked off to France to serve at a base in Paris, where he finds that his commanding officer, the pompous Colonel U. Charles Barker, had been expecting a bandmaster who played the trombone, and that his assignment to Barker′s unit had been the result of a clerical error. But when Judson helps a pet bird belonging to a girl who is a relative of French President Charles de Gaulle, his Paris assignment becomes permanent. Guest star: Dabbs Greer.
| 2 | "No Vacancy" | Unknown | Unknown | September 28, 1962 |
Judson needs a dispensary for his animals, so General Steele suggests using the spare room next to Colonel Barker′s office. Barker does not approve of the general′s decision, because he has turned the room into a plush suite for his own personal use.
| 3 | "The Man Who Cried Wolf" | Unknown | Unknown | October 5, 1962 |
Still angry because his plush living quarters have become a dispensary for Judson's animals, Colonel Barker concocts a plan to get rid of both Judson and his animals.
| 4 | "A Friend in Need" | Unknown | Unknown | October 12, 1962 |
Colonel Barker wants a date with Pat, but she is attracted to Judson — so Barker banishes Judson to night duty .
| 5 | "Only the Lonely" | Unknown | Unknown | October 19, 1962 |
General Steele asks Colonel Barker to join him in celebrating Steele′s 25th year in the Army, but Barker has a date, so he talks Madame Fatime into helping Steele celebrate. Guest stars: Karl Lucas, Stephen Pearlman, and Buck Kartalian.
| 6 | "The Dog Show" | Unknown | Unknown | November 2, 1962 |
When Judson requests permission to hold a dog show on the base to raise money for an Army relief fund, Colonel Barker denies his request — but when General Steele hears about Judson′s idea, he overrules Barker.
| 7 | "School Days" | Unknown | Unknown | November 9, 1962 |
The United States Department of Defense orders General Steele to start a course in United States history for his men — and Judson becomes the base's U.S. history instructor.
| 8 | "Hello, Miss Yossarian" | Unknown | Unknown | November 16, 1962 |
Angry with Selma because her coffee breaks are too long, Colonel Barker fires her and bans her from the base.
| 9 | "Who Stole My Boots?" | Unknown | Unknown | November 23, 1962 |
Corporal Lefkowitz takes Colonel Barker′s boots to a shoemaker for repairs. When the shoemaker bungles the job, Lefkowitz throws a punch at him — and ends up in jail. Guest stars: Len Weinrib, Eugene Borden, Dee J. Thompson, and Bill Peterson.
| 10 | "A Visit From Amos Doolittle" | Unknown | Unknown | November 30, 1962 |
Major Amos Doolittle of the inspector general′s office visits the base and is shocked to find that General Steele is not running things "the Army way."
| 11 | "Poor Little Hilda" | Unknown | Unknown | December 7, 1962 |
The base′s new Women's Army Corps commander, Major Hilda MacDougall, is too pretty, too efficient, and too proficient to please Colonel Barker. Guest star: Valerie Allen.
| 12 | "Play It, Sam" | Don McGuire | Unknown | December 14, 1962 |
Colonel Barker wants to open a nightclub in Paris, but Army regulations strictly forbid it. Series creator and episode director Don McGuire guest stars as General Nuxhall. Also guest-starring: Oscar Beregi and Nan Peterson.
| 13 | "Build a Better Mousetrap" | Unknown | Unknown | December 21, 1962 |
A mouse with a broken leg escapes from Judson′s dispensary and causes big problems on the base. Guest stars: Patrick Rossen, Byron Morrow, and Karl Lucas.
| 14 | "Take My Hand" | Unknown | Unknown | December 28, 1962 |
Captain Roger Andrews becomes a very bitter man after he is blinded in an automobile accident, so General Steele asks Pat to see if she can give his morale a boost. Guest star: Ron Hayes.
| 15 | "Raise Your Right Hand" | Unknown | Unknown | January 4, 1963 |
While touring the base, U.S. Senator Agajanian says he would like to see a court-martial. Guest stars: Bernard Kates
| 16 | "Rollo the Wonder Dog" | Unknown | Unknown | January 11, 1963 |
The famous performing canine "Rollo the Wonder Dog" is about to make a movie with Brigitte Bardot, but he has been acting sluggish lately, so his owner, Al Allen, brings him to the base's animal dispensary hoping for a quick cure. Guest star: Joe Mantell.
| 17 | "No Milk Today" | Unknown | Unknown | January 18, 1963 |
When Judson condemns a truckload of milk delivered to the base, Colonel Barker has to go without his daily breakfast cereal — and then learns that the milk company intends to sue the Army for breaking its contract.
| 18 | "Lorenzo Johnson, D.V.M., Retired" | Unknown | Unknown | January 25, 1963 |
Dr. Lorenzo Johnson, a former Army veterinarian, has fallen on hard times and become an alcoholic since leaving the Army, so Colonel Barker and Sergeant Wozniak decide to try getting him back on his feet — and stop him from drinking. Guest stars: Leo Penn, Oscar Beregi, and Guy de Vestal.
| — | "Peanut Butter and Crackers" | TBD | TBD | UNAIRED |
Judson has plans for a picnic with Pat, and it makes it hard for him to keep his mind on his work.
| — | "There They Go at Pimlico" | TBD | TBD | UNAIRED |
Angelo and Irving scheme to set up an international bookie joint. Guest stars: Joey Forman and Kip King.
| — | "The Saga of Stanley Wozniak" | TBD | TBD | UNAIRED |
Colonel Barker tries to drag Sergeant Wozniak along on maneuvers.
| — | "O'Hanlon's Back in Town" | TBD | TBD | UNAIRED |
Judson is attracted to Pat, but she is not interested.
| — | "Add One Egg" | TBD | TBD | UNAIRED |
Corporal Lefkowitz wins the base′s cooking contest.
| — | "The Fraternal Triangle" | TBD | TBD | UNAIRED |
Both Colonel Barker and General Steele try to get a date with the beautiful Major Hilda MacDougall. Guest star: Valerie Allen.
| — | "Le Baron Caper" | TBD | TBD | UNAIRED |
An arrogant French colonel brings his dog in for treatment, causing trouble for Judson. Guest star: Steven Geray.
| — | "Keep Your Head Down" | TBD | TBD | UNAIRED |
To improve morale on the base, General Steele decides to hold a golf tournament.
