= List of 1968 box office number-one films in the United States =

This is a list of films which placed number one at the weekly box office in the United States during 1968.

== Number-one films ==
†	Denotes the highest-grossing movie of the year.

#	Week ending	Film	Notes	Ref
1	January 3, 1968	Valley of the Dolls		
2	January 10, 1968	Valley of the Dolls		
3	January 17, 1968	Valley of the Dolls		
4	January 24, 1968	Valley of the Dolls	Valley of the Dolls grossed more than $500,000 from 24 key cities	
5	January 31, 1968	Valley of the Dolls		
6	February 7, 1968	Valley of the Dolls		
7	February 14, 1968	Guess Who's Coming to Dinner	Guess Who's Coming to Dinner grossed $603,000 from 12 cities	
8	February 21, 1968	Guess Who's Coming to Dinner	Guess Who's Coming to Dinner grossed nearly $600,000 from 13 cities	
9	February 28, 1968	Guess Who's Coming to Dinner	Guess Who's Coming to Dinner grossed nearly $900,000 from 18 cities	
10	March 6, 1968	Guess Who's Coming to Dinner	Guess Who's Coming to Dinner grossed $718,500 from 17 cities	
11	March 13, 1968	The Graduate †		
12	March 20, 1968	The Graduate †		
13	March 27, 1968	The Graduate †		
14	April 3, 1968	The Graduate †		
15	April 10, 1968	The Graduate †		
16	April 17, 1968	The Graduate †		
17	April 24, 1968	The Graduate †		
18	May 1, 1968	The Graduate †		
19	May 8, 1968	The Graduate †		
20	May 15, 1968	The Graduate †		
21	May 22, 1968	The Graduate †		
22	May 29, 1968	The Graduate †		
23	June 5, 1968	The Graduate †		
24	June 12, 1968	The Graduate †		
25	June 19, 1968	2001: A Space Odyssey	2001: A Space Odyssey reached number one in its eleventh week of release	
26	June 26, 1968	The Odd Couple	The Odd Couple grossed $509,000 from 11 key cities	
27	July 3, 1968	The Odd Couple		
28	July 10, 1968	The Odd Couple	The Odd Couple grossed $711,000 in the cities sampled	
29	July 17, 1968	The Odd Couple		
30	July 24, 1968	The Odd Couple		
31	July 31, 1968	The Odd Couple	The Odd Couple grossed $545,000 in the cities sampled	
32	August 7, 1968	The Odd Couple		
33	August 14, 1968	Rosemary's Baby		
34	August 21, 1968	Rosemary's Baby		
35	August 28, 1968	Rosemary's Baby		
36	September 4, 1968	Rosemary's Baby		
37	September 11, 1968	2001: A Space Odyssey	2001: A Space Odyssey returned to number one in its 23rd week of release	
38	September 18, 1968	Rosemary's Baby		
39	September 25, 1968	Rachel, Rachel	Rachel, Rachel grossed more than $300,000 in the cities sampled	
40	October 2, 1968	Rachel, Rachel		
41	October 9, 1968	Rachel, Rachel		
42	October 16, 1968	Barbarella		
43	October 23, 1968	Barbarella		
44	October 30, 1968	Funny Girl	Funny Girl reached number one in its sixth week of release	
45	November 6, 1968	Funny Girl		
46	November 13, 1968	Funny Girl		
47	November 20, 1968	Funny Girl		
48	November 27, 1968	Funny Girl		
49	December 4, 1968	Funny Girl		
50	December 11, 1968	Funny Girl		
51	December 18, 1968	Funny Girl		
52	December 25, 1968	Candy		

== Highest-grossing films ==
Highest-grossing films of 1968 by rental in the United States and Canada accruing to the distributor by the end of 1968.

Rank	Title	Studio	Director	Producer	Rental ($)
1.	The Graduate	Avco Embassy	Mike Nichols	Lawrence Turman	39,000,000
2.	Guess Who's Coming to Dinner	Columbia	Stanley Kramer	Stanley Kramer	25,100,000
3.	Gone With the Wind	MGM	Victor Fleming	David O. Selznick	23,000,000
4.	Valley of the Dolls	20th Century Fox	Mark Robson	David Weisbart	20,000,000
5.	The Odd Couple	Paramount	Gene Saks	Howard W. Koch	18,500,000
6.	Planet of the Apes	20th Century Fox	Franklin J. Schaffner	Arthur P. Jacobs	15,000,000
7.	Rosemary's Baby	Paramount	Roman Polanski	William Castle	12,300,000
8.	The Jungle Book	Buena Vista	Wolfgang Reitherman	Walt Disney	11,500,000
9.	Yours, Mine and Ours	United Artists	Melville Shavelson	Robert F. Blumofe	11,000,000
10.	The Green Berets	Warner Bros.-Seven Arts	John Wayne-Ray Kellogg	Michael Wayne (Batjac Productions)	8,700,000

== See also ==
- List of American films — American films by year
- Lists of box office number-one films

== Chronology ==
Preceded by 1967	1968	Succeeded by 1969
