= Robert F. Boyle =

American film art director and production designer (1909-2010)

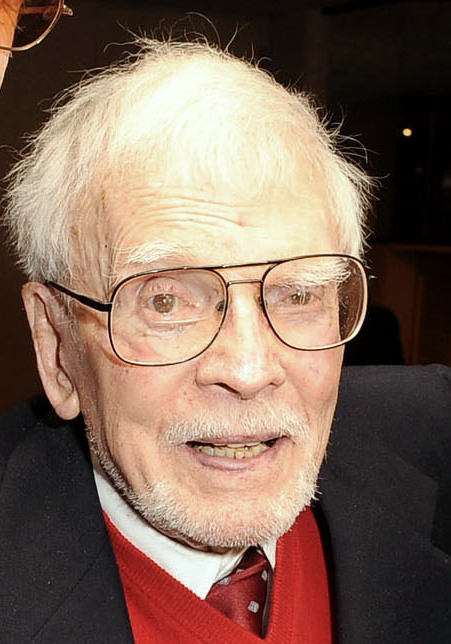
- Boyle in 2009
- Born: Robert Francis Boyle; October 10, 1909; Los Angeles, California, U.S.
- Died: August 1, 2010 (aged 100); Los Angeles, California, U.S.
- Occupations: Art director, production designer
- Years active: 1933–2010
- Spouse: Bess Taffel

Robert Francis Boyle (October 10, 1909 – August 1, 2010) was an American film art director and production designer. He was nominated for four Academy Awards for North by Northwest (1959), Gaily, Gaily (1969), Fiddler on the Roof (1971), and The Shootist (1976), before winning the Honorary Academy Award in 2008. He was also nominated for a Primetime Emmy Award for The Red Pony (1973).

Besides North by Northwest, Boyle is also known for his work on such other Alfred Hitchcock films as The Birds (1963), and Marnie (1964). He also was the art director for The Russians Are Coming, The Russians Are Coming (1966), How to Succeed in Business Without Really Trying (1967), In Cold Blood (1967), The Thomas Crown Affair (1968), Mame (1974), and Private Benjamin (1980).

== Early life ==
Born in Los Angeles, Boyle trained as an architect, graduating from the University of Southern California (USC). When he lost his job in that field during the Great Depression, Boyle found work in films as an extra.

== Career ==
In 1933 he was hired as a draftsman in the Paramount Pictures art department, headed by supervising art director Hans Dreier. Beginning with Cecil B. DeMille's The Plainsman, Boyle went on to work on a variety of pictures as a sketch artist, draftsman and assistant art director before becoming an art director at Universal Studios in the early 1940s.

Boyle collaborated several times with Alfred Hitchcock, first as an associate art director for Saboteur (1942) and later as a full-fledged production designer for North by Northwest (1959), The Birds (1963), and Marnie (1964). Denied permission to shoot footage on Mount Rushmore, Hitchcock turned to Boyle to create realistic replicas of the stone heads.

Boyle abseiled down the monument, photographing its contours in detail, before constructing "just enough to put the actors on so we could get down shots, up shots, side shots, whatever we needed." Almost two decades earlier, Boyle had delivered the Statue of Liberty reproduction that was used in the climactic scene of Saboteur. For The Birds, Boyle was put in charge of the title characters. He later recalled, "We needed to find out which birds we could use best, and finally settled on two types: sea gulls, which were very greedy beasts that would always fly toward the camera if there was a piece of meat, and crows, which had a strange sort of intelligence." Boyle described his relationship with Hitchcock: "It was a meeting of equals: the director who knew exactly what he wanted, and the art director who knew how to get it done."

When director Norman Jewison failed in his attempts to get the necessary submarine that was at the center of his The Russians Are Coming, the Russians Are Coming storyline, Boyle built a working model from Styrofoam and fiberglass.

Boyle's other credits include It Came from Outer Space, Cape Fear, In Cold Blood, Fiddler on the Roof, Portnoy's Complaint, Winter Kills, W.C. Fields and Me, The Shootist, Private Benjamin, Staying Alive, and Troop Beverly Hills.

During the course of his career, Boyle was nominated four times for the Academy Award for Best Art Direction, but never won. In 1997 he received the Art Directors Guild's Lifetime Achievement Award, and he was voted an Honorary Academy Award by the Board of Governors of the Academy of Motion Picture Arts and Sciences, "in recognition of one of cinema's great careers in art direction," which he received during the 80th Academy Awards ceremony on February 24, 2008.

At the age of 98, Boyle became the oldest winner ever of an Honorary Award in the history of the Academy Awards. In ill health and arriving to the ceremony in a wheelchair, Boyle insisted on walking onstage, alongside Nicole Kidman, to receive the honor. He was the subject of the Academy Award-nominated documentary short The Man on Lincoln's Nose (2000).

== Personal life and death ==
Boyle's wife, Bess Taffel, whose career began in the Yiddish theatre, was a Hollywood blacklistee, whose film career ended in 1951 after she was "named" by Leo Townsend, although her husband's career was apparently unharmed. They lived in a house that Bob designed and built in The Hollywood Hills, for their entire marriage.

Unable to have children of their own, they adopted two girls; Emily Rebecca Boyle, in 1956 and Susan Anne Boyle (Licon) in 1959. He also worked at the American Film Institute's Center for Advanced Film Study program in Los Angeles as the Production Design instructor.

A widower since 2000, Boyle died on August 1, 2010, in Los Angeles due to natural causes.

== Awards and nominations ==
Year	Association	Category	Project	Result	Ref.
1959	Academy Awards	Best Production Design	North by Northwest	Nominated	
1969	Academy Awards	Best Production Design	Gaily, Gaily	Nominated	
1971	Academy Awards	Best Production Design	Fiddler on the Roof	Nominated	
1976	Academy Awards	Best Production Design	The Shootist	Nominated	
2007	Academy Awards	Honorary Academy Award		Honored	
1973	Primetime Emmy Award	Outstanding Art Direction for a Single-Camera Series	The Red Pony	Nominated	

== See also ==
- Art Directors Guild Hall of Fame
