= John Foreman (producer) =

American film producer

- Born: John Christian Foreman; July 26, 1925; Idaho Falls, Idaho U.S.
- Died: November 20, 1992 (aged 67); Beverly Hills, California U.S.
- Occupation: Film producer
- Spouse(s): Linda Lawson (m. 1961)
- Children: 2, including Amanda

John Foreman (July 26, 1925 – November 20, 1992) was an American film producer.

== Early life ==
John Christian Foreman was born on July 26, 1925, in Idaho Falls, Idaho. Foreman served in the U.S. Navy during World War II.

== Career ==
In the late 1960s, he and actor Paul Newman founded Newman-Foreman productions. He went on to produce Winning (1969) and Butch Cassidy and the Sundance Kid (1969). He later produced four films in collaboration with director John Huston, The Life and Times of Judge Roy Bean (1972), The Mackintosh Man (1973), The Man Who Would Be King (1975), and Prizzi's Honor (1985). His other film credits as producer include, The Effect of Gamma Rays on Man-in-the-Moon Marigolds (1972) and They Might Be Giants (1971)

He was nominated twice for an Academy Award for Best Picture as the producer of Butch Cassidy and the Sundance Kid and Prizzi's Honor.

== Personal life ==
Forman was married to actress and singer Linda Lawson. They had two daughters, Amanda and Julie.

== Death ==
He died on November 19, 1992, in Beverly Hills, California.

== Filmography ==
He was producer for all films unless otherwise noted.

=== Film ===
Year	Film	Credit	Notes
1969	Winning		
1969	Butch Cassidy and the Sundance Kid		
1970	WUSA		
1970	Puzzle of a Downfall Child		
1971	They Might Be Giants		
1971	Sometimes a Great Notion		
1972	Pocket Money		
1972	The Life and Times of Judge Roy Bean		
1972	The Effect of Gamma Rays on Man-in-the-Moon Marigolds	Executive producer	
1973	The Mackintosh Man		
1975	The Man Who Would Be King		
1977	Bobby Deerfield	Executive producer	
1978	The First Great Train Robbery		
1984	The Ice Pirates		
1985	Prizzi's Honor		
1989	Millennium	Executive producer	
1991	Mannequin Two: On the Move	Executive producer	Final film as a producer
1996	Up Close & Personal	Executive producer	Posthumous release
