= List of awards and nominations received by Joanne Woodward =

Joanne Woodward awards and nominations
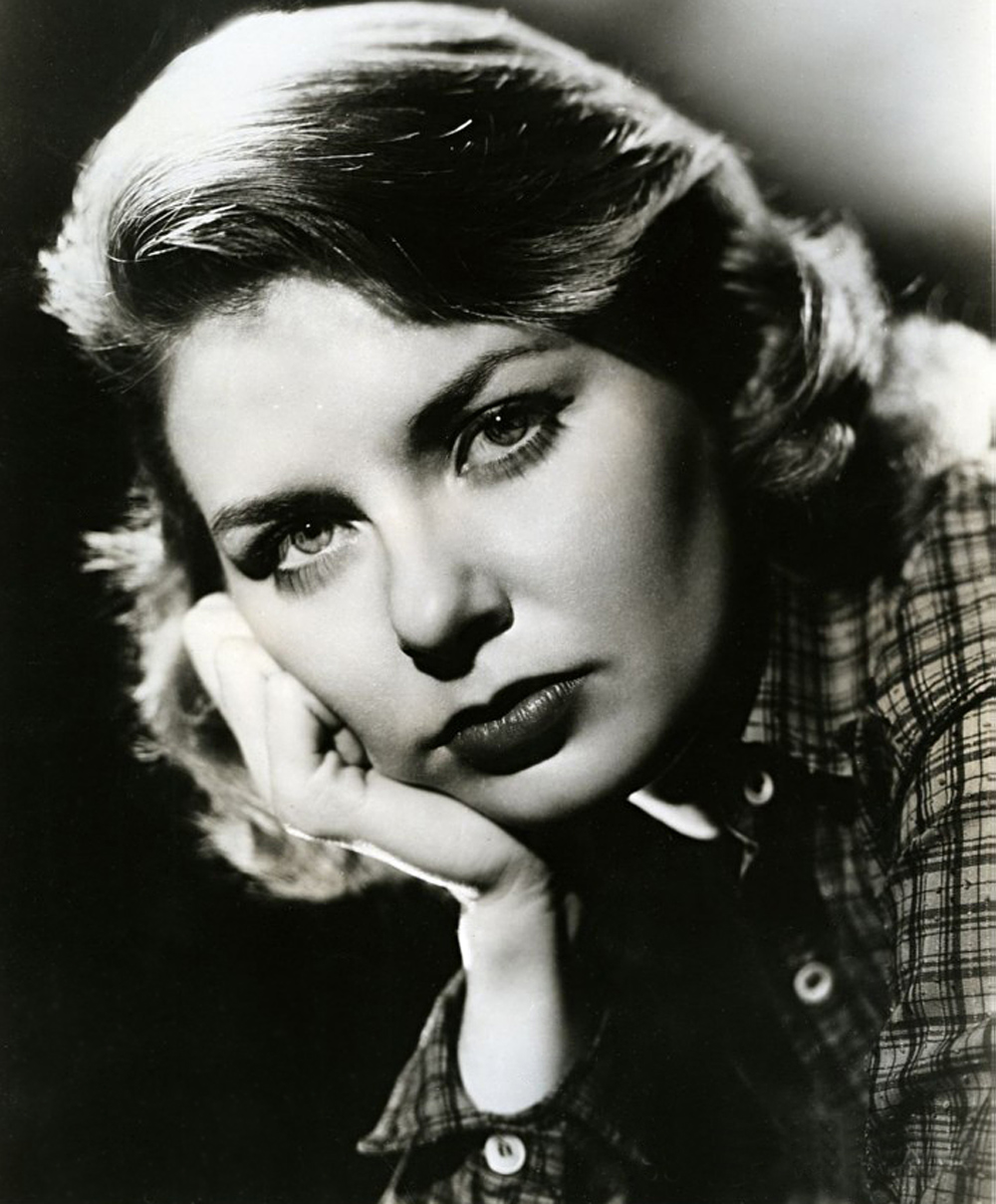
- Woodward in 1960
Awards and nominations
Major Awards	Wins	Nominations
Academy Awards	1	4
British Academy Film Awards	1	4
Golden Globe Awards	3	10
Primetime Emmy Awards	3	10
Grammy Awards	0	1
Screen Actors Guild Awards	1	2
Wins	27
Nominations	67

The following is a list of awards and nominations received by American actress Joanne Woodward.

Joanne Woodward is an American actress and producer. She became known for playing complex women with a characteristic nuance and depth of character. Among her accolades are an Academy Award, three Primetime Emmy Awards, a British Academy Film Award, three Golden Globe Awards, and a Screen Actors Guild Award as well as a nomination for a Grammy Award.

She won the Academy Award for Best Actress for her portrayal of a woman with dissociative identity disorder in the drama The Three Faces of Eve (1957). She was Oscar-nominated for her roles as an unmarried schoolteacher going through a sexual awakening in Rachel, Rachel (1968), a New York City housewife in Summer Wishes, Winter Dreams (1973), and an old-fashioned woman living in the country in Mr. & Mrs. Bridge (1990).

Woodward is the widow of actor Paul Newman, with whom she often collaborated either as a co-star, or as an actor in films directed or produced by him. Woodward, as well as Newman, is a Tony Award away from achieving the Triple Crown of Acting status. In 1960, she became one of the first people who receive the star on the Hollywood Walk of Fame. In 1993, she was awarded with Kennedy Center Honors.

Upon the death of Olivia de Havilland in July 2020 she became the oldest living Best Actress Academy Award winner.

== Major associations ==
=== Academy Awards ===
Year	Category	Nominated work	Result	Ref.
1957	Best Actress	The Three Faces of Eve	Won	
1968	Best Actress	Rachel, Rachel	Nominated	
1973	Best Actress	Summer Wishes, Winter Dreams	Nominated	
1990	Best Actress	Mr. & Mrs. Bridge	Nominated	

=== BAFTA Awards ===
Year	Category	Nominated work	Result	Ref.
British Academy Film Awards
1958	Best Foreign Actress	The Three Faces of Eve	Nominated	
1959	Best Foreign Actress	No Down Payment	Nominated	
1969	Best Actress in a Leading Role	Rachel, Rachel	Nominated	
1975	Best Actress in a Leading Role	Summer Wishes, Winter Dreams	Won	

=== Emmy Awards ===
Year	Category	Nominated work	Result	Ref.
Primetime Emmy Awards
1977	Outstanding Lead Actress in a Drama or Comedy Special	Sybil	Nominated	
1978	Outstanding Lead Actress in a Drama or Comedy Special	See How She Runs	Won	
1981	Outstanding Lead Actress in a Limited Series or a Special	Crisis at Central High	Nominated	
1985	Outstanding Lead Actress in a Limited Series or a Special	Do You Remember Love	Won	
1990	Outstanding Informational Special (as a producer)	American Masters (episode "Broadway's Dreamers: The Legacy of the Group Theatre")	Won	
1990	Outstanding Informational Special (as a producer)	American Masters (episode "Harold Lloyd: The Third Genius")	Nominated	
1990	Outstanding Performance in Informational Programming	American Masters (episode "Broadway's Dreamers: The Legacy of the Group Theatre")	Nominated	
1993	Outstanding Lead Actress in a Miniseries or a Special	Blind Spot	Nominated	
1994	Outstanding Lead Actress in a Miniseries or a Special	Breathing Lessons	Nominated	
2005	Outstanding Supporting Actress in a Miniseries or Movie	Empire Falls	Nominated	

=== Golden Globe Awards ===
Year	Category	Nominated work	Result	Ref.
1957	Best Actress in a Motion Picture – Drama	The Three Faces of Eve	Won	
1963	Best Actress in a Motion Picture – Comedy or Musical	A New Kind of Love	Nominated	
1968	Best Actress in a Motion Picture – Drama	Rachel, Rachel	Won	
1972	Best Actress in a Motion Picture – Drama	The Effect of Gamma Rays on Man-in-the-Moon Marigolds	Nominated	
1973	Best Actress in a Motion Picture – Drama	Summer Wishes, Winter Dreams	Nominated	
1981	Best Actress – Miniseries or Television Film	Crisis at Central High	Nominated	
1985	Best Actress – Miniseries or Television Film	Do You Remember Love	Nominated	
1990	Best Actress in a Motion Picture – Drama	Mr. & Mrs. Bridge	Nominated	
1994	Best Actress – Miniseries or Television Film	Breathing Lessons	Won	
2005	Best Supporting Actress – Television	Empire Falls	Nominated	

=== Grammy Awards ===
Year	Category	Nominated work	Result	Ref.
1993	Best Spoken Word Album	Mr. and Mrs. Bridge	Nominated	

=== Screen Actors Guild Awards ===
Year	Category	Nominated work	Result	Ref.
1985	Life Achievement Award		Won	
1995	Outstanding Actress in a Miniseries or Television Movie	Breathing Lessons	Won	
2005	Outstanding Actress in a Miniseries or Television Movie	Empire Falls	Nominated	

== International awards ==
Award	Year	Category	Work	Result
Cannes Film Festival	1973	Best Actress	The Effect of Gamma Rays on Man-in-the-Moon Marigolds	Won
Independent Spirit Awards	1988	Best Female Lead	The Glass Menagerie	Nominated
Independent Spirit Awards	1991	Best Female Lead	Mr. & Mrs. Bridge	Nominated
David di Donatello Awards	1991	Best Foreign Actress	Mr. & Mrs. Bridge	Nominated
San Sebastián International Film Festival	1960	Silver Shell for Best Actress	The Fugitive Kind	Won

== Critic awards ==
Award	Year	Category	Work	Result
Chicago Film Critics Association Awards	1991	Best Actress	Mr. & Mrs. Bridge	Nominated
Kansas City Film Critics Circle Awards	1968	Best Actress	Rachel, Rachel	Won
Kansas City Film Critics Circle Awards	1973	Best Actress	The Effect of Gamma Rays on Man-in-the-Moon Marigolds	Won
Kansas City Film Critics Circle Awards	1974	Best Actress	Summer Wishes, Winter Dreams	Won
Kansas City Film Critics Circle Awards	1990	Best Actress	Mr. & Mrs. Bridge	Won
Los Angeles Film Critics Association Awards	1990	Best Actress	Mr. & Mrs. Bridge	Nominated
National Society of Film Critics Awards	1969	Best Actress	Rachel, Rachel	2nd place
National Society of Film Critics Awards	1974	Best Actress	Summer Wishes, Winter Dreams	3rd place
National Society of Film Critics Awards	1991	Best Actress	Mr. & Mrs. Bridge	Nominated
New York Film Critics Circle Awards	1968	Best Actress	Rachel, Rachel	Won
New York Film Critics Circle Awards	1974	Best Actress	Summer Wishes, Winter Dreams	Won
New York Film Critics Circle Awards	1990	Best Actress	Mr. & Mrs. Bridge	Won

== Other awards ==
Award	Year	Category	Work	Result
CinEuphoria Awards	2017	Honorary Award		Won
Film Society of Lincoln Center	1975	Gala Tribute		Won
Gold Derby Awards	2005	TV Movie/Mini Supporting Actress	Empire Falls	Nominated
Golden Apple Awards	1976	Female Star of the Year		Won
Hasty Pudding Theatricals	1975	Woman of the Year		Won
ICG Publicists Awards	1969	Showmanship Award	Motion Picture	Won
Laurel Awards	1958	Top New Female Personality		Won
Laurel Awards	1959	Top Female Comedy Performance	Rally 'Round the Flag, Boys!	4th place
Laurel Awards	1962	Top Female Star		15th place
Laurel Awards	1964	Top Female Dramatic Performance	The Stripper	5th place
Laurel Awards	1964	Top Female Star		11th place
Laurel Awards	1966	Female Star		12th place
Laurel Awards	1967	Female Star		10th place
Laurel Awards	1967	Female Comedy Performance	A Big Hand for the Little Lady	4th place
Laurel Awards	1968	Female Star		10th place
Laurel Awards	1970	Female Star		Nominated
Laurel Awards	1970	Female Dramatic Performance	Rachel, Rachel	Nominated
Laurel Awards	1971	Star, Female		Nominated
National Board of Review Awards	1957	Best Actress	The Three Faces of Eve, No Down Payment	Won
Online Film & Television Association Awards	2005	Best Supporting Actress in a Motion Picture or Miniseries	Empire Falls	Nominated
Online Film & Television Association Awards	2020	OFTA Film Hall of Fame		Won
TV Land Awards	2006	Blockbuster Movie of the Week	Sybil	Nominated
