= Paul Newman on screen and stage =

List of films by Paul Newman

Paul Newman filmography
- Film: 66
- Television: 12
- Theatre: 9
- Directing: 7
- Others: 12 producer, 1 video game

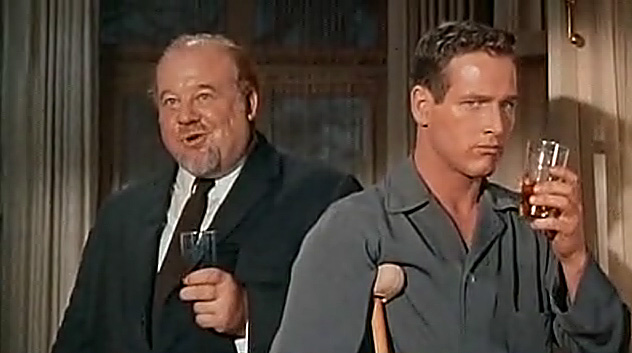
Newman (right) as "Brick", next to "Big Daddy" (Burl Ives), in Cat on a Hot Tin Roof (1958).

Paul Newman is an American actor who appeared in numerous productions on screen and stage during his career spanning almost 60 years.

Newman had an inauspicious debut in film with The Silver Chalice (1954), but his performance in Somebody Up There Likes Me (1956) garnered praise and a positive career trajectory. Serious roles in films such as The Helen Morgan Story (1957), The Young Philadelphians (1959), and Exodus (1960) followed soon after. It was around this time he also met the love of his life, Joanne Woodward, whom he would marry and remain with for the rest of his life.

After their first pairing in The Long, Hot Summer (1958), Newman & Woodward became a frequent on-screen team. Their other on-screen collaborations were Rally 'Round the Flag, Boys! (1958), From the Terrace (1960), Paris Blues (1961), A New Kind of Love (1963), Winning (1969), WUSA (1970), The Drowning Pool (1975), Harry & Son (1984), and Mr. & Mrs. Bridge (1990). He remained behind the camera on three further pairings: Rachel, Rachel (1968), his directorial debut, earning him an Oscar nomination for Best Picture plus a Golden Globe win for Best Director; The Effect of Gamma Rays on Man-in-the-Moon Marigolds (1972); The Glass Menagerie (1987); and The Shadow Box (1980), which aired on TV. He also produced, but did not direct, her film, They Might Be Giants (1971). They united once on the small screen, for Empire Falls (2005) on HBO, which won Newman an Emmy and another Golden Globe. Finally, they both participated in the Martin Luther King Jr. documentary, King: A Filmed Record...Montgomery to Memphis (1970).

His career breakthrough occurred with his performance in Cat on a Hot Tin Roof (1958), which earned him his first Academy Award nomination for Best Actor. Subsequent nominations would follow via the films The Hustler (1961), Hud (1963), and Cool Hand Luke (1967). In between those, he starred in several other notable titles, such as Sweet Bird of Youth (1962), Torn Curtain (1966), Hombre (1967); and in one of his signature roles, as the former titular character in Butch Cassidy and the Sundance Kid (1969).

Newman next starred in such 1970s films as Sometimes a Great Notion (1971), The Life and Times of Judge Roy Bean (1972), The Sting (1973), The Towering Inferno (1974), and Slap Shot (1977). The 1980s brought two consecutive Oscar nominations along, from Absence of Malice (1981) and The Verdict, followed by an Academy Honorary Award presented in 1986. But it would be the sequel to Hustler featuring the return of "Fast Eddie" Felson, The Color of Money (1986), that would finally see Paul Newman voted the Best Actor Oscar winner at the 1987 awards ceremony.

Over the next two decades, Newman received one more honorary Oscar, the Jean Hersholt Humanitarian Award. In addition, he garnered two final nominations: one more in lead, for Nobody's Fool (1994); and his only one for Best Supporting Actor, for Road to Perdition (2002). He was featured in a few other occasional films, such as The Hudsucker Proxy (1994), and (in his only major voice acting credit) Pixar's Cars (2006).

And even though his stage career was brief, he had some noted success there as well. He made his Broadway stage debut in Picnic, and also did stints in the 1950s in The Desperate Hours and Sweet Bird of Youth, the latter of which led to him being cast in the film role. Finally, his last big stage role in Our Town earned him his only Tony Award nomination.

Here is a complete list of Paul Newman's known acting credentials.

== As actor ==
=== Film ===
Year	Title	Role	Notes
1954	The Silver Chalice	Basil	
1956	Somebody Up There Likes Me	Rocky Graziano	
1956	The Rack	Capt. Edward W. Hall Jr.	
1957	The Helen Morgan Story	Larry Maddux	
1957	Until They Sail	Capt. Jack Harding	
1958	The Long, Hot Summer	Ben Quick	
1958	The Left Handed Gun	Billy the Kid	
1958	Cat on a Hot Tin Roof	Brick Pollitt	
1958	Rally Round the Flag, Boys!	Harry Bannerman	
1959	The Young Philadelphians	Anthony Judson Lawrence	
1960	From the Terrace	David Alfred Eaton	
1960	Exodus	Ari Ben Canaan	
1961	The Hustler	Fast Eddie Felson	
1961	Paris Blues	Ram Bowen	
1962	Sweet Bird of Youth	Chance Wayne	
1962	Hemingway's Adventures of a Young Man	Ad Francis, "The Battler"	
1963	Hud	Hud Bannon	
1963	A New Kind of Love	Steve Sherman	
1963	The Prize	Andrew Craig	
1964	What a Way to Go!	Larry Flint	
1964	The Outrage	Juan Carrasco	
1965	Lady L	Armand Denis	
1966	Harper	Lew Harper	Alternate title: The Moving Target
1966	Torn Curtain	Prof. Michael Armstrong	
1967	Hombre	John Russell	
1967	Cool Hand Luke	Lucas "Luke" Jackson	
1968	The Secret War of Harry Frigg	Pvt. Harry Frigg	
1969	Winning	Frank Capua	
1969	Butch Cassidy and the Sundance Kid	Butch Cassidy	
1970	WUSA	Rheinhardt	
1970	King: A Filmed Record... Montgomery to Memphis	Himself	Documentary
1971	Sometimes a Great Notion	Hank Stamper	Alternate title: Never Give a Inch
1972	Pocket Money	Jim Kane	
1972	The Life and Times of Judge Roy Bean	Judge Roy Bean	
1973	The Mackintosh Man	Joseph Rearden	
1973	The Sting	Henry Gondorff	
1974	The Towering Inferno	Doug Roberts	
1975	The Drowning Pool	Lew Harper	
1976	Silent Movie	Himself	Cameo
1976	Buffalo Bill and the Indians, or Sitting Bull's History Lesson	Buffalo Bill	
1977	Slap Shot	Reggie "Reg" Dunlop	
1979	Quintet	Essex	
1980	When Time Ran Out...	Hank Anderson	
1981	Fort Apache, The Bronx	Murphy	
1981	Absence of Malice	Michael Colin Gallagher	
1982	The Verdict	Frank Galvin	
1984	Harry & Son	Harry Keach	
1986	The Color of Money	Fast Eddie Felson	Academy Award for Best Actor
1989	Fat Man and Little Boy	Gen. Leslie R. Groves	
1989	Blaze	Gov. Earl K. Long	
1990	Mr. & Mrs. Bridge	Walter Bridge	
1994	The Hudsucker Proxy	Sidney J. Mussburger	
1994	Nobody's Fool	Donald J. "Sully" Sullivan	
1998	Twilight	Harry Ross	
1999	Message in a Bottle	Dodge Blake	
2000	Where the Money Is	Henry Manning	
2002	Road to Perdition	John Rooney	
2004	Tell Them Who You Are	Himself	Documentary
2005	Magnificent Desolation: Walking on the Moon 3D	Dave Scott	Voice; documentary short
2006	Roving Mars	Narrator (introduction)	Documentary
2006	Cars	Doc Hudson	Voice; special racing consultant; final traditional film role
2006	Mater and the Ghostlight	Doc Hudson	Voice; short film
2007	Dale	Narrator	Voice; documentary
2008	The Meerkats	Narrator	Posthumous release; voice; documentary; final film role
2015	Winning: The Racing Life of Paul Newman	Himself	Posthumous release; documentary; archival footage
2017	Cars 3	Doc Hudson	Posthumous release; voice (unused audio recordings from Cars)

=== Television ===
Year	Title	Role	Notes
1952	Tales of Tomorrow	Sgt. Wilson	Episode: "Ice From Space"
1955	Producers' Showcase	George Gibbs	Episode: "Our Town"
1955	Appointment with Adventure	Mack	Episode: "Five in Judgement"
1956	The United States Steel Hour	Henry Wiggen	Episode: "Bang the Drum Slowly"
1958	Playhouse 90	Christian Darling	Episode: "The 80 Yard Run"
1971	Once Upon a Wheel	Himself	ABC Television documentary
1982	Come Along with Me	Hughie	Voice; television film
2001	The Simpsons	Himself	Voice; episode: "The Blunder Years"
2003	Our Town	The Stage Manager	Showtime / PBS Television film
2005	Empire Falls	Max Roby	HBO miniseries; two episodes
2022	The Last Movie Stars	Himself	Posthumous release; HBO Max docu-series; archival footage
2023	Restless - Being Paul Newman	Himself	Posthumous release; television documentary; archival footage

=== Theatre ===
Year	Title	Role	Playwright	Venue
1949	Harvey	Elwood P. Dowd	Mary Chase	Belfry Players Theater, Williams Bay, Wisconsin
1951	Phaedra	Hippolytus of Athens	Jean-Baptiste Racine	Yale University Experimental Theatre
1952	Beethoven	Karl van Beethoven	Dorothy B. Bland	Yale University Theater, New Haven, Connecticut
1953	Picnic	Alan Seymour	William Inge	Music Box Theatre, Broadway
1955	The Desperate Hours	Glenn Griffin	Joseph Hayes	Ethel Barrymore Theatre, Broadway
1959	Sweet Bird of Youth	Chance Wayne	Tennessee Williams	Martin Beck Theatre, Broadway
1964	Baby, Want a Kiss?	Emil	James Costigan	Little Theatre, Broadway
2002	Our Town	The Stage Manager	Thornton Wilder	Booth Theatre, Broadway
2004	Trumbo	Dalton Trumbo	Christopher Trumbo	Westport Country Playhouse, Westport, Connecticut

=== Video games ===
Year	Title	Voice role	Notes
2006	Cars	Doc Hudson	Voice

== As director or producer ==
Year	Film	Notes
1962	On the Harmful Effects of Tobacco	Director and producer (name removed from sole 16mm print)
1968	Rachel, Rachel	Golden Globe Award for Best Director - Motion Picture; New York Film Critics Circle Award for Best Director; Nominated – Academy Award for Best Picture; Nominated – Directors Guild of America Award for Outstanding Directing – Feature Film
1969	Butch Cassidy and the Sundance Kid	Co-executive producer (uncredited)
1969	Winning	Co-executive producer (uncredited)
1970	WUSA	Co-producer
1970	Sometimes a Great Notion	Director and co-executive producer
1971	They Might Be Giants	Producer
1972	The Effect of Gamma Rays on Man-in-the-Moon Marigolds	Director and producer Nominated – Palme d'Or for Best Director
1972	The Life and Times of Judge Roy Bean	Co-executive producer (uncredited)
1980	The Shadow Box	Director; Nominated – Primetime Emmy Award for Outstanding Directing for a Miniseries, Movie or a Dramatic Special
1984	Harry & Son	Director and producer
1987	The Glass Menagerie	Director; Nominated – Palme d'Or for Best Director
2005	Empire Falls	Executive producer Nominated – Primetime Emmy Award for Outstanding Miniseries; Nominated – Producers Guild of America Award for Outstanding Producer of Long-Form Television

== See also ==
- List of awards and nominations received by Paul Newman
