= From the Terrace =

1960 film by Mark Robson

- Theatrical release poster
- Directed by: Mark Robson
- Screenplay by: Ernest Lehman
- Based on: From the Terrace by John O'Hara
- Produced by: Mark Robson
- Starring: Paul Newman; Joanne Woodward; Myrna Loy
- Cinematography: Leo Tover
- Edited by: Dorothy Spencer
- Music by: Elmer Bernstein
- Distributed by: 20th Century Fox
- Release date: July 15, 1960 (United States)
- Running time: 144 minutes
- Country: United States
- Language: English
- Budget: $3 million
- Box office: $5.2 million (US and Canada rentals)

From the Terrace is a 1960 American DeLuxe Color romantic drama film in CinemaScope directed by Mark Robson from a screenplay by Ernest Lehman, based on the 1958 novel of the same name by John O'Hara. The film stars Paul Newman, Joanne Woodward, Myrna Loy, Ina Balin, George Grizzard, and Leon Ames, with a young Barbara Eden appearing in one scene. The plot tells the story of the estranged son of a Pennsylvania steel mill owner who marries into a prestigious family and moves to New York to seek his fortune.

This was the third theatrically released film that real-life spouses Newman and Woodward made together.

== Plot ==
In 1946, navy veteran David Alfred Eaton returned home from the war to Philadelphia. He finds his mother, Martha, driven to alcoholism by years of neglect and abuse from her husband Samuel Eaton, owner of a prestigious iron and steel company. Having withdrawn from his family after the death of his firstborn son thirteen years earlier, Samuel has resentment towards Alfred. As a result, Alfred turns his back on the family business and strikes out on his own with his closest friend Lex Porter.

While attending a party at the estate of Lex's wealthy uncle, Alfred is dazzled by Mary St. John, the daughter of a wealthy family. Mary is drawn into a relationship with Alfred and defies her parents by breaking her secret engagement to Dr. Jim Roper. After Alfred's father Samuel falls ill, Alfred shuns the family business once again to start an aviation company with Lex.

On his wedding day, Alfred receives word that his father has died. With his uncle's money, Lex funds the Nassau Aircraft Corporation with Alfred, but Alfred becomes impatient when Lex shows more interest in perfecting aircraft designs than in selling aircraft.

One wintry day, Alfred and Mary are driving home from a party when they see a little boy fall through the thin ice of a frozen pond. Alfred plunges into the icy waters to save him. The boy's grandfather, James Duncan MacHardie, the most famous financier in America, invites Alfred and Mary to dinner. MacHardie offers Alfred a job in his investment firm.

Obsessed by the need to outdo his father, Alfred travels the country for MacHardie, leaving Mary alone for months at a time. Lonely and self-pitying, Mary begins to resent Alfred's constant absences. MacHardie's son-in-law, Creighton Duffy, suggests that Alfred spend two months in rural Pennsylvania checking out the business aptitude and prospects of Ralph Benziger, a prosperous coal mine owner.

After an ugly argument with his wife, Alfred goes to Pennsylvania. Invited to dinner at Benziger's home, he meets Natalie, the man's beautiful and compassionate daughter. Feeling lonely, Alfred impetuously invites Natalie on a date, but she refuses because he is married. However, she later reconsiders and meets him at a drive-in movie the following evening.

Alfred confides to Natalie that her warmth and generosity have made him realize what a sham his marriage is. They share a kiss, but Natalie still believes they must end this relationship before it goes any further.

Upon returning to New York, Alfred is immediately summoned to MacHardie's office. He is informed that Mary has been having an affair with Dr. Roper. However, the archly conservative MacHardie warns Alfred that he will not tolerate divorce within his firm. MacHardie also assigns him to analyze the Nassau Aircraft Corp., his former firm, as a possible investment.

One night while leaving a party with his wife, Alfred unexpectedly encounters Natalie in front of the hotel. Sensing that Alfred and Natalie are intimate, Mary vindictively calls Roper and makes a date with him. Alfred goes to meet Natalie and tells her that, although he is estranged from Mary, his career prevents him from requesting a divorce.

Alfred begins to investigate Nassau Aircraft's business practices. Duffy, who has become unethically involved with Nassau and will reap a financial windfall if MacHardie invests in the company, threatens to blackmail Alfred unless he suppresses his report.

Alfred and Natalie meet for a tryst in a hotel room. Photographers hired by Duffy burst in and captured their indiscretion. Natalie, uncertain if Alfred's main concern is to save her reputation or his career, decides to leave. Mary suggests to her husband that they share an open marriage, seeing whomever they please. The scandalous photos are delivered to Alfred at his home.

At work the next day, MacHardie ushers in Mary to celebrate Alfred's surprise promotion to partner. Alfred rises and denounce MacHardie's hypocrisy of placing success and social position above personal responsibility and happiness. Alfred then issues the uncensored report exposing Duffy's duplicity and walks out. Mary runs after him, but it is too late. He leaves her for good and returns to Natalie's home for a new life—with his wedding ring now missing from his finger.

== Cast ==
- Paul Newman as David Alfred Eaton
- Joanne Woodward as Mary St. John
- Ina Balin as Natalie Benziger
- Myrna Loy as Martha Eaton
- Leon Ames as Samuel Eaton
- Elizabeth Allen as Sage Remmington
- Barbara Eden as Clemmie Shreve
- George Grizzard as Lex Porter
- Patrick O'Neal as Dr. Jim Roper
- Felix Aylmer as James MacHardie
- Raymond Greenleaf as Fritz Thornton
- Malcolm Atterbury as George Fry
- Raymond Bailey as Mr. Eugene St. John
- Ted de Corsia as Ralph Benziger
- Howard Caine as Creighton Duffy
- Kathryn Givney as Mrs. St. John
- Lauren Gilbert as Frolick

== Release ==
The film had its world premiere engagements at the Paramount Theatre and Murray Hill Theatre in New York City on July 15, 1960.

== Reception ==
Howard Thompson of The New York Times wrote: "This is a handsome picture, well-performed and emotionally intriguing ... However, for a drama so sharply and ironically concerned with human foibles, in business, love and marriage, it lacks real culminative power." Variety stated that "the more discriminating film-goer will find 'From the Terrace' seriously deficient. Whether the fault lies with O'Hara's basic material or Ernest Lehman's screenplay is difficult to assay by a reviewer who skipped the novel ... On the assumption that Lehman followed the O'Hara story closely, the blame must be placed squarely on the novelist, for 'From the Terrace' builds up to one big cliche." Philip K. Scheuer of the Los Angeles Times wrote that the film "has been bolstered a degree above soap opera by its creators and does make a point of sorts against modern materialism", though "one is left with the feeling that its makers were not able to compress the portions that they have used into a drama of much consequence or climax". Richard L. Coe of The Washington Post called the film "an interminable essay on the horrors of money, love, and sex", with a story that "has more gaps than a dial phone". Harrison's Reports was positive, declaring it "Outstanding entertainment ... It is loaded with brilliant dialogue, expert acting, human interest, suspense, and some comic touches." The Monthly Film Bulletin called it "a seriously deficient film. After a long prologue devoted to providing a motivation for Alfred's obsessive pursuit of wealth (in the course of which Myrna Loy's thorough portrayal of alcoholic misery becomes a stiff price to pay for what amounts to very meagre enlightenment), the film builds up to a shapeless monument of banality." John McCarten wrote in The New Yorker that "Mr. Robson's direction is, except for the first few scenes, unimaginative. But then, the screenplay Mr. Lehman has come up with would hardly inspire anybody." The Chicago Tribune's reviewer wrote: "It is the talented Paul Newman's picture, attaining its greatest validity when he is performing. He stands head and shoulders over the other members of the cast, and that includes his capable wife, Joanne Woodward, who has a role with glitter and glamor but no depth....The story is a tangled one, with the opening scenes the most effective....I found it a fairly ordinary tale about fairly obvious people which takes an extremely long time to unreel."

Joanne Woodward later admitted to having "affection" for the film "because of the way I looked like Lana Turner." Her glamorous costumes were designed by Travilla.

The film holds a score of 31% on Rotten Tomatoes based on 13 reviews.

== Notes ==
Additional films that Paul Newman and Joanne Woodward made together:

- The Long, Hot Summer (1958)
- Rally 'Round the Flag, Boys! (1958)
- Paris Blues (1961)
- A New Kind of Love (1963)
- Rachel, Rachel (1968), produced and directed by Paul Newman
- Winning (1969)
- WUSA (1970)
- They Might Be Giants (1971)
- The Effect of Gamma Rays on Man-in-the-Moon Marigolds (1972), produced and directed by Paul Newman
- The Drowning Pool (1975)
- Harry & Son (1984)
- The Glass Menagerie (1987), produced and directed by Paul Newman
- Mr. & Mrs. Bridge (1990)
- Our Town (2003 TV movie)
- Empire Falls (2005 TV miniseries)
