= List of awards and nominations received by Paul Newman =

Paul Newman awards and nominations
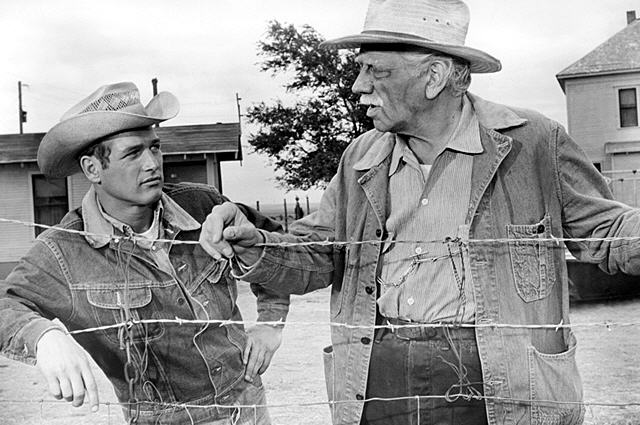
- Newman (left) with Melvyn Douglas, who won the Oscar for Hud (1963).
Awards and nominations
Award	Wins	Nominations
Academy Awards	1	10
Golden Globe Awards	7	16
Primetime Emmy Awards	1	4
BAFTA Awards	1	5
Grammy Awards	0	2
Tony Awards	0	1

Paul Newman (1925—2008) was an American actor, director and producer whose career in film, theatre and television spanned seven decades. A film icon, Newman is one of the few performers to have received nominations for all EGOT awards (Emmy Award, Grammy Award, Academy Award, and Tony Award). He is the recipient of an Academy Award, a British Academy Film Award, seven Golden Globe Awards, a Primetime Emmy Award, a Screen Actors Guild Award, and has been nominated for two Grammy Awards, a Tony Award, and a Directors Guild of America Award. He also won Best Actor awards at the Cannes and Berlin International Film Festivals, and was awarded with the Cecil B. DeMille Award in 1985, the Academy Honorary Award and Screen Actors Guild Life Achievement Award in 1986, the Kennedy Center Honors in 1992, and the Jean Hersholt Humanitarian Award in 1994. He has been honored with a star on the Hollywood Walk of Fame in 1994.

== Awards and nominations ==
=== Academy Awards ===
The Academy Awards, popularly known as the Oscars, are presented annually by the American Academy of Motion Picture Arts and Sciences (AMPAS) to recognize excellence of professionals in the film industry. Newman was nominated for ten competitive awards and was the recipient of an Honorary Award and the Jean Hersholt Humanitarian Award.

Year	Category	Nominated work	Result
1959	Best Actor	Cat on a Hot Tin Roof	Nominated
1962	Best Actor	The Hustler	Nominated
1964	Best Actor	Hud	Nominated
1968	Best Actor	Cool Hand Luke	Nominated
1969	Best Picture	Rachel, Rachel	Nominated
1982	Best Actor	Absence of Malice	Nominated
1983	Best Actor	The Verdict	Nominated
1986	Academy Honorary Award	—N/a	Honored
1987	Best Actor	The Color of Money	Won
1994	Jean Hersholt Humanitarian Award	—N/a	Honored
1995	Best Actor	Nobody's Fool	Nominated
2003	Best Supporting Actor	Road to Perdition	Nominated

=== Golden Globe Awards ===
Year	Category	Nominated work	Result	Ref.
1957	New Star of the Year – Actor	Somebody Up There Likes Me	Won (Note: Shared with John Kerr (Tea and Sympathy) and Anthony Perkins (Friendly Persuasion).)	
1962	Best Actor – Motion Picture Drama	The Hustler	Nominated	
1963	Best Actor – Motion Picture Drama	Sweet Bird of Youth	Nominated	
1963	Best Supporting Actor – Motion Picture	Hemingway's Adventures of a Young Man	Nominated	
1964	Henrietta Award — World Film Favorite	—N/a	Won	
1964	Best Actor – Motion Picture Drama	Hud	Nominated	
1966	Henrietta Award — World Film Favorite	—N/a	Won	
1968	Henrietta Award — World Film Favorite	—N/a	Won	
1968	Best Actor – Motion Picture Drama	Cool Hand Luke	Nominated	
1969	Best Director	Rachel, Rachel	Won	
1983	Best Actor – Motion Picture Drama	The Verdict	Nominated	
1985	Cecil B. DeMille Award	—N/a	Honored	
1987	Best Actor – Motion Picture Drama	The Color of Money	Nominated	
1995	Best Actor – Motion Picture Drama	Nobody's Fool	Nominated	
2003	Best Supporting Actor – Motion Picture	Road to Perdition	Nominated	
2006	Best Supporting Actor – Television	Empire Falls	Won	
2006	Best Miniseries or Television Film	Empire Falls	Won	

The Golden Globe Awards are presented annually by the Hollywood Foreign Press Association (HFPA) to recognize outstanding achievements in the entertainment industry, both domestic and foreign, and to focus wide public attention upon the best in motion pictures and television. Newman won three competitive awards and received the Cecil B. DeMille Award.

=== Grammy Awards ===
Year	Category	Nominated work	Result
1993	Best Spoken Word Or Non-Musical Album	Mr. and Mrs. Bridge	Nominated
2000	Best Spoken Word Album for Children	The Adventures of Tom Sawyer	Nominated

=== Tony Awards ===
Year	Category	Nominated work	Result
2003	Best Leading Actor in a Play	Our Town	Nominated

=== Emmy Awards ===
The Academy of Television Arts & Sciences (ATAS) honors national prime time television entertainment. Newman was nominated for four Emmys and won once.

Year	Category	Nominated work	Result
1981	Outstanding Directing in a Limited Series or a Special	The Shadow Box	Nominated
2003	Outstanding Lead Actor in a Miniseries or a Movie	Our Town	Nominated
2005	Outstanding Miniseries	Empire Falls	Nominated
2005	Outstanding Supporting Actor in a Miniseries or a Movie	Empire Falls	Won

=== National Board of Review ===
Newman received the award for Best Actor in 1986 (for The Color of Money) from the U.S. National Board of Review of Motion Pictures.

== Other honors ==
- Newman Day
- Sports Car Club of America Hall of Fame, 2009
- Lime Rock Park, Paul Newman Straight, 2022

== See also ==
- Paul Newman on screen and stage
