= Melissa Newman =

American artist and singer (born 1961)

- Born: Melissa Stewart Newman; September 27, 1961 (age 64); Hollywood, California, U.S.
- Occupations: Artist; singer; actress
- Years active: 1969–1990
- Parents: Paul Newman; Joanne Woodward
- Relatives: Nell Newman (sister); Scott Newman (half-brother)

Melissa Stewart "Lissy" Newman (born September 27, 1961) is an American artist, singer and former actress who appeared in the 1990 film Mr. & Mrs. Bridge, and at the 30th Annual Primetime Emmy Awards.

== Career ==
On the big screen at 7 years of age, her first appearance was in Rachel, Rachel (1968) during the classroom scene, which is not credited. A year later, she appears in Sometimes a Great Notion (1970), as Lissy Stamper, the daughter of Joe Ben (Richard Jaeckel) and Jan (Linda Lawson). In Mr. & Mrs. Bridge (1990), she has a cameo as Young India at the Pool, appearing in silent home movies (at the beginning and end of the film) as a flashback of Mrs. India Bridge, who was portrayed by Newman's mother, Joanne Woodward.

On television, she had a supporting role as Laney, the teenage daughter of the protagonist Betty Quinn (Joanne Woodward), in the 1978 movie See How She Runs.

== Personal life ==
Melissa Newman was born in the Hollywood section of Los Angeles, California, the daughter of famous American actors Joanne Woodward (born 1930), and Paul Newman (1925–2008), and the younger sister of Elinor Teresa ("Nell") Newman (born 1959, as a child actress also known under the name of Nell Potts), and a younger sister, Claire Olivia ("Clea") Newman (born 1965). She was born on the same day in September 1961 that her parents' film Paris Blues was released in the U.S.

She grew up shuttling back and forth with her well-known actor parents between opposite U.S. coasts of Westport, Connecticut in the East of New England and Hollywood / Los Angeles, on the West Coast. She attended and graduated from the Sarah Lawrence College in Yonkers, New York in 1988.

Newman is married to Raphael ("Raphe") Elkind, a middle school teacher, and they have 2 children. They currently reside in Westport, Connecticut, in the 19th- century home previously owned by her parents.

In 2023, young Newman published a book of personal photos and letters of her parents' relationship spanning over several decades entitled Head Over Heels: Joanne Woodward and Paul Newman: A Love Affair in Words and Pictures that included never before seen love letters and rare photos by acclaimed artists such as Richard Avedon and Stewart Stern.

== Filmography ==
- Mr. & Mrs. Bridge (1990) as Young India Bridge at the Pool
- See How She Runs (1978) as Janey Quinn (credited as Lissy Newman)
- Sometimes a Great Notion (1970) as Lissy Stamper (uncredited)
- Rachel, Rachel (1968) as a girl in the classroom (uncredited)

=== As herself ===
- Entertainment Tonight (TV series) – Episode dated September 30, 2008
- Entertainment Tonight (TV series) – Episode dated September 29, 2008
- The 30th Annual Primetime Emmy Awards (TV special) (1978)
