= 1968 New York Film Critics Circle Awards =

34th New York Film Critics Circle Awards

34th New York Film Critics Circle Awards

January 26, 1969
(announced December 30, 1968)

Best Picture:
The Lion in Winter

The 34th New York Film Critics Circle Awards, honored the best filmmaking of 1968.

== Winners ==
- Best Actor:
  - Alan Arkin - The Heart Is a Lonely Hunter
- Best Actress:
  - Joanne Woodward - Rachel, Rachel
- Best Director:
  - Paul Newman - Rachel, Rachel
- Best Film:
  - The Lion in Winter
- Best Foreign Language Film:
  - War and Peace (Voyna i mir) • Soviet Union
- Best Screenplay:
  - Lorenzo Semple Jr. - Pretty Poison
- Special Award:
  - Yellow Submarine
