= The Effect of Gamma Rays on Man-in-the-Moon Marigolds =

1965 play by Paul Zindel

- Original language: English
- Written by: Paul Zindel
- Characters: Beatrice; Tillie; Janice Vickery; Nanny; Ruth
- Genre: Drama
- Setting: the home of Beatrice

Premiere
- Date: 12 May 1965
- Place: Alley Theatre; Houston

The Effect of Gamma Rays on Man-in-the-Moon Marigolds is a play written by Paul Zindel, a playwright and science teacher. Zindel received the 1971 Pulitzer Prize for Drama and a New York Drama Critics' Circle Award for the work.

The play centers on a project for a science fair and the family life of the protagonist. It was performed throughout the 20th century and made into a film.

== Productions ==
The play's world premiere happened in the 1964/1965 season at the Alley Theatre in Houston.

The play premiered Off-Broadway at the Mercer Arts Center on April 7, 1970, and closed on May 14, 1972, after 819 performances. Directed by Melvin Bernhardt, the cast featured Swoosie Kurtz (Janice Vickery), Amy Levitt (Ruth), Judith Lowry (Nanny), Pamela Payton-Wright (Tillie), and Sada Thompson (Beatrice) and Joan Blondell (Beatrice).

A touring production produced by Theatre Now and directed by Leland Ball, starring Teresa Wright (Beatrice), Alexandra Stoddart (Tillie), Robin Nolan (Ruth), Helen Ross (Nanny), and Carol Potter (Janice Vickery), toured from October 13, 1972, until February 8, 1973.

The play was presented on Broadway at the Biltmore Theatre, from March 9, 1978 (previews) to March 26, 1978. Directed by A. J. Antoon, the cast included Shelley Winters (Beatrice), Carol Kane (Tillie), Lolly Boroff (Janice Vickery), Isabella Hoopes (Nanny), and Lori Shelle (Ruth).

The Oregon Shakespeare Festival also produced the play in 1978 at its intimate Black Swan theater, directed by William Glover.

== Plot ==
The play revolves around a dysfunctional family consisting of single mother Beatrice and her two daughters, Ruth and Tillie, who try to cope with their abysmal status in life. The play is a lyrical drama, reminiscent of Tennessee Williams' style.

Shy Matilda Hunsdorfer, nicknamed Tillie, prepares an experiment involving marigolds raised from seeds exposed to radioactivity for her science fair. She is, however, constantly thwarted by her self-centered and abusive mother, Beatrice, and by her extroverted yet unstable sister Ruth, who submits to her mother's will. Over the course of the play, Beatrice constantly tries to stamp out any opportunities Tillie has of succeeding, due to Beatrice's own lack of success in life. As the play progresses, the paths of the three characters diverge: Ruth has a nervous collapse while attempting to stand up to Beatrice, who, driven to the verge of insanity by her deep-seated enmity, impulsively kills the girls' pet rabbit, and wallows in her own perceived insignificance. Tillie meanwhile (much like her project's deformed yet beautiful, hardy marigolds) wins the science fair through sheer perseverance.

== Characters ==
Matilda "Tillie" Hunsdorfer
The main protagonist of the play. A quiet and introverted character who is teased at school. She copes with her life by immersing herself in science, hoping to reach a philosophical epiphany. Her untiring quest for her individuality stands in open defiance of her mother's wish for total control over the family. Consequently, she receives the brunt of the abuse. Tillie also owns a rabbit named Peter, given to her by her science teacher, Mr. Goodman.

Ruth Hunsdorfer
Tillie's older sister. A brash but confused adolescent, she looks to others for advice, but often gains this insight from Beatrice, who she favors in several ways. On many occasions, she paints Tillie as the crazy one, and has epilepsy and night terrors. She also takes a liking to Tillie's pet rabbit, to the point where she blackmails Tillie for possession of the rabbit by threatening to tell their mother what the adults at the school call her—"Betty the Loon."

Beatrice Hunsdorfer
Tillie's and Ruth's mother. A single mother whose life has gone awry, she copes with it through self-loathing, cynicism, and drug abuse, and by verbally (and at times physically) abusing her two daughters, which is not shown in the film. As the play's main antagonist, Beatrice is mainly narcissistic, domineering, and lethally short-tempered, which is only worsened by the drugs. However, her plight is sympathetic, as her past reveals a life spiraling steadily downward from serendipitous circumstances, leading her to self-destruction. Memorable actresses who played the leading role include Eileen Heckart, Sada Thompson, Shelley Winters, Helena Carroll, Joan Blondell and Joanne Woodward.

Mr. Goodman
Tillie's science teacher. He serves as a mentor to Tillie. Mr. Goodman is mentioned on many occasions, but never seen, although the dialogue often implies that he is the only positive role model in Tillie's life.

Nanny
An elderly boarder in the Hunsdorfer household. Silent throughout, she does not contribute much beyond being yet another burden to the already stressed-out Beatrice who verbally abuses her as she does her daughters. Veteran actress Judith Lowry played "Nanny" in nearly every production of the play, including TV, Off-Broadway and the movie. During the off-Broadway run, even though her character never spoke any lines in the play, she became a popular guest on The Tonight Show with Johnny Carson, which led to late stardom as a series regular on Phyllis with Cloris Leachman.

Mr Frank
Beatrice's father. A deceased vegetable vendor. After his wife (Beatrice's mother) died, he raised Beatrice on his own. Although he had a lowly status, Beatrice holds him in high regard—"He makes up for all the men in the world"—and smiles imagining her daughters meeting him.

Janice Vickery
Tillie's rival at the science fair. Her experiment involved boiling the skin off a dead cat so she may use its skeleton. She plans to use a dog in her next science fair project.

== Film adaptation ==
It was adapted for the screen in 1972, directed by Paul Newman and starring his wife Joanne Woodward, daughter Nell Potts, and Roberta Wallach, daughter of Eli Wallach. Woodward won the award for Best Actress at the 1973 Cannes Film Festival.

== Hebrew Adaptation: ==
The Play was Translated Into Hebrew By Yaakov Shabtai for a production at the Cameri Theatre in October 1972, directed by Hiller Neeman. Hana Maron portrayed Beatrice, Batya played Tillie and Yael Aviv played Ruth.

The play was staged also at Aplha Theatre of the Academy of Performing Arts, directed by Dor Peles, With original music composed by Romi Peles. the production Featrued Hadar Levin as Beatrice (Betty), Gal Bramli as Tillie, and Kalanit Katz as Ruth.

The play was also performed at Beit Zvi and the Library Thearte

== Awards and nominations ==
The play won the Pulitzer Prize for Drama for 1971.

Winners

- 1970 New York Drama Critics' Circle Award, Best American Play, Paul Zindel
- 1970 Clarence Derwent Award, Pamela Payton-Wright
- 1970 Obie Award

- Distinguished Direction, Melvin Bernhardt
- Distinguished Performance, Pamela Payton-Wright
- Best American Play, Paul Zindel
- Best Performance, Sada Thompson
