= Judith Lowry =

American actress (1890–1976)

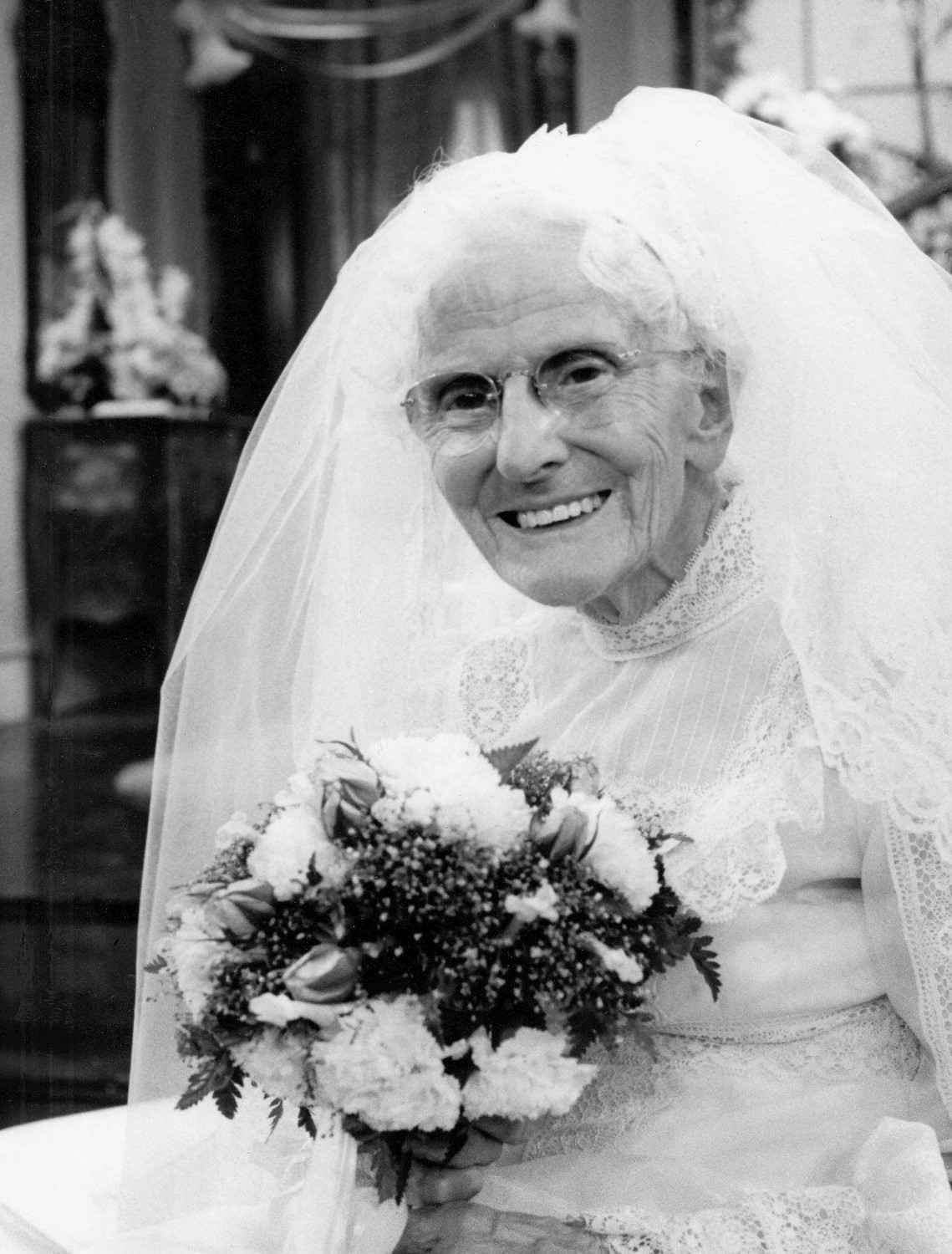
- Lowry in Phyllis, 1976
- Born: Judith Carter Ives; July 27, 1890; Fort Sill, Oklahoma Territory, U.S.
- Died: November 29, 1976 (aged 86); Greenwich Village, New York, U.S.
- Resting place: Long Island National Cemetery, Farmingdale, New York, U.S.
- Occupation: Actress
- Years active: 1913–1921, 1952–1976
- Spouse: Rudd Lowry (1920–1965; his death)
- Children: 9

Judith Carter Lowry (née Ives; July 27, 1890 – November 29, 1976) was an American actress. She had nearly 30 film and television roles and appeared on stage, most notably in the Off-Broadway production of The Effect of Gamma Rays on Man-in-the-Moon Marigolds and on Broadway in Archibald MacLeish's J.B. She became well known for her role as Mother Dexter on the CBS show Phyllis during the last year of her life, but died midway through the show's second season.

== Early life ==
Judith Carter Ives was born at Fort Sill, Oklahoma, where her father was temporarily stationed. She was the daughter of Mildred Elizabeth Megeath and Francis Joseph Ives . Her father was a career surgeon in the U.S. Army, attaining the rank of major. Her father saw action in the Spanish–American War, serving initially in Cuba and later in the Philippines, before retiring to Washington, D.C. in 1908, where he died. Through her father, Lowry was a descendant of American Revolutionary War soldier Asahel Ives.

== Career ==
Lowry made her stage debut in 1913 in a stock company in Washington, D.C. In 1921, she gave birth to her first child and retired from acting to raise her family. She resumed her acting career in 1952 after the youngest of nine children turned 18, appearing on stage and taking occasional bit parts in film and television. It was not until her eighties that she began to receive more substantial roles. Lowry played an uncredited part in Valley of the Dolls (1967) as Aunt Amy, followed by roles in such films as The Anderson Tapes and Cold Turkey.

Her best-remembered role is that of acid-tongued, no-nonsense Mother Dexter on the 1970s sitcom Phyllis, starring Cloris Leachman. This was Lowry's last major acting role. She died of a heart attack during the series' final season. One of the last episodes she filmed before her death, "Mother Dexter's Wedding", marked the final appearance of veteran actor Burt Mustin, who played her bridegroom, Arthur Lanson. By the time the episode aired in December 1976, Lowry had died at age 86, and the 92-year-old Mustin, who died in January 1977, was too ill to see it. After the airing of "Mother Dexter's Wedding", five more episodes of Phyllis followed in which Lowry appeared.

== Death ==
Lowry collapsed and died from a heart attack while walking down a Greenwich Village street with her son Rayphield Semmes Lowry, on November 29, 1976; she was 86 years old. She was buried next to her husband, Rudd Lowry, in Long Island National Cemetery, Farmingdale, New York.

== Filmography ==
=== Selected films ===
Title	Year	Role	Notes
13 Rue Madeleine	1947	Peasant Woman	Uncredited
The Miracle Worker	1962	1st Crone	Uncredited
Ladybug Ladybug	1963	Grandmother	
Andy	1965		
The Trouble with Angels	1966	Sister Prudence	
The Tiger Makes Out	1967	Elderly Tenant	Uncredited
Valley of the Dolls	1967	Aunt Amy	Uncredited
The Night They Raided Minsky's	1968	Mother Annie	
Sweet Charity	1969	Old Lady on Park Bench	Uncredited
Popi	1969	Elderly Hospital Patient	Uncredited
On a Clear Day You Can See Forever	1970		Uncredited
Husbands	1970	Stuart's Grandmother	
Cold Turkey	1971	Odie Turman	
The Anderson Tapes	1971	Mrs. Hathaway	
The Effect of Gamma Rays on Man-in-the-Moon Marigolds	1972	Nanny	
Superdad	1973	Mother Barlow	

=== Television ===
Show	Year	Role	Notes
Studio One	1954	Mrs. Blake	1 episode
The Phil Silvers Show	1956	Josie	1 episode
Naked City	1961	Old Woman	1 episode
Car 54, Where Are You?	1961-1963	Trixie	3 episodes
The Patty Duke Show	1964-1965	Miss Tansy	2 episodes
The Jackie Gleason Show	1966-1967	Old Lady	3 episodes
Dark Shadows	1968	Hands of Cassandra	1 episode
Night Gallery	1970	Miss Wattle	1 episode
Maude	1974–1975	Aunt Polly	2 episodes
Kojak	1975	Lily Weed	1 episode
Phyllis	1975–1977	Sally "Mother" Dexter	23 episodes (final appearance)
