= Summer Wishes, Winter Dreams =

1973 film by Gilbert Cates

- Theatrical release poster
- Directed by: Gilbert Cates
- Written by: Stewart Stern
- Produced by: Jack Brodsky
- Starring: Joanne Woodward; Martin Balsam; Sylvia Sidney; Ron Rickards
- Cinematography: Gerald Hirschfeld
- Edited by: Sidney Katz
- Music by: Johnny Mandel
- Production company: Rastar
- Distributed by: Columbia Pictures
- Release date: October 21, 1973
- Running time: 93 minutes
- Country: United States
- Language: English

Summer Wishes, Winter Dreams is a 1973 American drama film directed by Gilbert Cates and written by Stewart Stern, starring Joanne Woodward, Martin Balsam, and Sylvia Sidney. It tells the story of a New York City housewife who rethinks her relationships with her husband, her children, and her mother.

Summer Wishes, Winter Dreams garnered two nominations at the 46th Academy Awards, and three nominations at the 31st Golden Globe Awards.

== Plot ==
Rita Walden is a depressed, middle-aged wife and mother living in New York. One night, she has a nightmare of herself plummeting inside an airplane with her son Bobby seated a few seats above. The next morning, Rita goes to her ophthalmologist husband, Harry, to have her eyes examined. While she babysits for her adult daughter Anna and her husband Joel, Rita sees a picture of Bobby, who is living in Amsterdam. Rita lunches at a restaurant with her elderly mother, Wanda. While shopping, Wanda experiences some chest pains, but she and Rita decide it is simply an indigestion.

They watch Ingmar Bergman's Wild Strawberries inside a movie theater, where Rita falls asleep and dreams of herself inside the film in which she finds Bobby in her apartment with a young man. Rita wakes up and finds her mother is suffering from another attack. Wanda is taken to a hospital where doctors are unable to revive her and she dies. A few days later, a limousine drives the family to visit the burial plot, which is only partially dug. As they wait for the funeral attendants, Rita argues with her sister Betty and her brother-in-law Fred when he suggests they sell Wanda's farm. This infuriates Rita who insists the farm was intended for Bobby.

At the farm, Rita wanders about the barn where she remembers her grandmother who read her poetry. She also recalls a young farm boy named Carl Hurlbutt, who was later killed during World War II. When Rita does not join in with her family, Anna finds her mother in the loft and pleads with her to sell the farm to support the family. Rita steadily refuses, to which Anna accuses of her of selfishness. Back at their apartment, Harry surprises his wife with flight tickets to Europe for a vacation, hoping it will help Rita clear her mind.

On their flight to Europe, Rita dreams of Bobby returning home. She tells Harry about her dream and remarks she can sleep again now that her mother has died. In London, Rita shops for gifts, and inside the subway, she recalls her mother's voice. As the crowd pushes through the subway tunnel, Rita becomes emotional after she sees a vision of her mother as she rides the escalator. At Rita's request, a man contacts Harry, who arrives at the subway and consoles her.

Later that night, in their hotel suite, Harry reflects on his time as a soldier during World War II. The next day, Harry and Rita travel to Bastogne, Belgium where they tour a war museum. Outside, Harry runs out to the battlefield where the siege of Bastogne occurred, where he states he remembers the soldiers who died there and that he killed three Germans; from there, he promised to never waste his life.

That evening, at a restaurant, Rita and Harry express feeling at peace with their past, to which Rita reveals that she has decided to sell the farm. Nevertheless, Rita is concerned that Bobby will not contact them. Harry tells Rita that Bobby is living with a male lover in Amsterdam and although he wishes his parents well, he does not wish to see them. In disbelief, Rita storms out of the restaurant.

In their hotel suite, Rita rushes to Harry's separate bedside, and tearfully wonders if she can apologize to her family for being so patient with her. She is also distraught she never told her mother and Bobby that she loved them, and fears her coldness forced Bobby to live as a homosexual. Harry disagrees and states their son was who he was since birth. Rita then suggests they move into a smaller apartment back home, to which Harry smiles and holds her close.

== Cast ==
- Joanne Woodward as Rita Walden
- Martin Balsam as Harry Walden
- Sylvia Sidney as Rita's Mother
- Tresa Hughes as Betty Goody
- Dori Brenner as Anna
- Ron Rickards as Bobby Walden
- Win Forman as Fred Goody
- Peter Marklin as Joel
- Nancy Andrews as Mrs. Hungerford
- Minerva Pious as woman in theatre
- Sol Frieder as man in theatre
- Helen Ludlam as grandmother
- Grant Code as grandfather
- Gaetano Lisi as student in theatre
- Lee Jackson as Carl

== Reception and analysis ==
=== Analysis ===
In 1981, film historian Vito Russo wrote that "only twice has a serious American film dealt with homosexuality as a family issue or even suggested that homosexuals might be someone's children." He noted the films as being this one and Bloodbrothers as the other. He continued on saying that in this film, the "homosexuality of Rita's son is seen only in terms of how the revelation affects her present mid-life crisis, as one more token of her failure as a wife and mother." Russo also points out that Bobby moves to Amsterdam with his lover and cuts off contact with his parents "until they can deal with him as he is; he turns their inability to see him as a whole person into their problem, not his problem."

Author Noah Tsika argues that "while its stridency would seem to make it an ideal candidate for camp status, the film is actually closer in tone to queer tragedy and contains thematic elements so profoundly recognizable that they cannot be recuperated as comedy; in particular, the film's motif of maternal rejection – so believably embodied by a brittle Joanne Woodward – makes this film an uncomfortably realistic account of American family life."

=== Critical reception ===
Nora Sayre of The New York Times wrote: "From time to time, there's a movie that makes you feel like a moderate heel; although you respect the talents and the themes, it's not possible to respond emotionally, even though you might want to." Nevertheless, she praised the performances of Joanne Woodward and Martin Balsam, but concluded the "banality of the script means that Summer Wishes is a forlorn waste of two fine character actors."

Ruth Gilbert of New York magazine that the film is "a lovely, intense and deeply affecting drama of emotional crisis, with a fine performance by Joanne Woodward in a searing portrait of a middle-aged woman, forced, on her mother's death, to face her own pattern of living. Martin Balsam and Sylvia Sidney are equally fine in a film that matters and will remain in your heart."

Variety wrote that the "performances by Woodward, Balsam and Sidney are first-rate, and they create genuinely tender moments; but only those past 40 and approaching 50 or more are likely to feel the depth." Richard Schickel, in his review for Time magazine, offered praise for Woodward's performance, writing "there is no more authentic, believably feminine spirit on the screen today; she is brittle, cold, hysterical, but above all a woman who knows that she is lost and is in desperate search of herself. It is a lovely performance, almost matched by Balsam."

Steven Mears of Film Comment opined that "for much of the film's first half, Balsam stands in the background of his scenes, fecklessly trying to comfort his unresponsive wife or broker peace with her relatives; pudgy, his thinning hair combed over with characteristic optimism and his conversation rife with hackneyed pleasantries, Harry is hardly what Rita as a warm-blooded farm girl imagined her romantic future held."

== Awards and nominations ==
Year	Award	Category	Nominee	Result	Ref.
1973	National Board of Review	Best Supporting Actress	Sylvia Sidney	Won	
1973	New York Film Critics Circle Awards	Best Actress	Joanne Woodward	Won	
1973	Academy Awards	Best Actress	Joanne Woodward	Nominated	
1973	Academy Awards	Best Supporting Actress	Sylvia Sidney	Nominated	
1973	Golden Globe Awards	Best Actress	Joanne Woodward	Nominated	
1973	Golden Globe Awards	Best Supporting Actor	Martin Balsam	Nominated	
1973	Golden Globe Awards	Best Supporting Actress	Sylvia Sidney	Nominated	
1974	National Society of Film Critics Awards	Best Actress	Joanne Woodward	Nominated	
1974	National Society of Film Critics Awards	Best Supporting Actress	Sylvia Sidney	Nominated	
1974	Kansas City Film Critics Circle Awards	Best Actress	Joanne Woodward	Won	
1974	Kansas City Film Critics Circle Awards	Best Supporting Actress	Sylvia Sidney	Won	
1975	British Academy Film Awards	Best Actress	Joanne Woodward	Won	
1975	British Academy Film Awards	Best Supporting Actress	Sylvia Sidney	Nominated	

== See also ==
- Joanne Woodward filmography
- List of American films of 1973
- List of LGBTQ-related films of 1973
