= Do You Remember Love (film) =

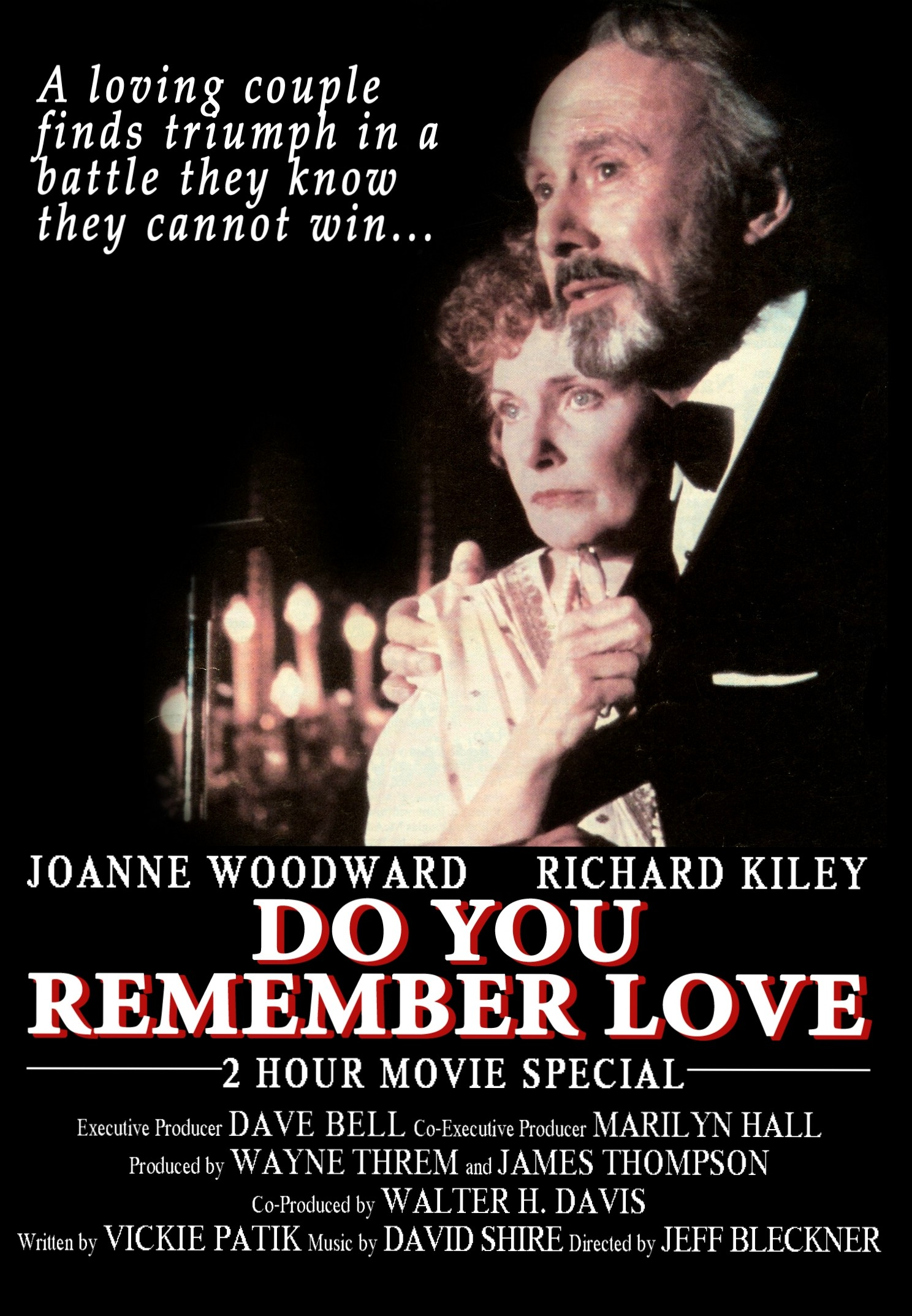
- Genre: Drama; Family; Romance
- Written by: Vickie Patik
- Directed by: Jeff Bleckner
- Starring: Joanne Woodward; Richard Kiley; Geraldine Fitzgerald; Jerry Hardin; Ron Rifkin
- Music by: David Shire
- Country of origin: United States
- Original language: English

Production
- Executive producers: Dave Bell; Marilyn Hall
- Producers: Joseph Broido; James Thompson; Wayne Threm
- Cinematography: Bradford May
- Running time: 100 minutes
- Production company: Dave Bell Associates

Original release
- Network: CBS
- Release: May 21, 1985

Do You Remember Love is a 1985 American drama television film starring Joanne Woodward and Richard Kiley. It won 3 Primetime Emmy Awards, the Humanitas Prize, the Writers Guild of America Award, and a Peabody Award.

== Synopsis ==
Barbara Wyatt-Hollis is known among her academic colleagues for her wit and is popular with her students. she received tenure if she were on the basis of her work as a poet. She has received several literary prizes and was nominated for the Longfellow Award, given only once a decade.

Barbara is lovingly married to George, who runs his own machine shop and is more than happy to have Barbara as the star of the family. George couldn't be more proud when he learns that Barbara is a nominee for poetry's number-one award, which he's sure she'll win. In the midst of the excitement, Barbara's mother, Lorraine, breaks her hip. George suggests Lorraine convalesce at Barbara and George's home. Uneasy, Barbara nevertheless agrees.

Lorraine discovers Barbara's sugar bowl is full of salt and begins to notice a lot of odd things about Barbara's behavior, especially that her daughter is uncharacteristically quick to anger. Lorraine asks George if he hasn't noticed the changes in Barbara, but he brushes it off. But George has indeed noticed the changes and is most troubled by her temper, which has always had an edge but seems now to be careening out of control. One evening Barbara gets so angry during a squabble that she bites her husband.

George talks to his campus-psychiatrist friend, who observes Barbara at a party and tells George of a specialist he knows. Barbara agrees that something may be wrong. After many tests, the specialist concludes through the process of elimination that Barbara has Alzheimer's. In an effort to cope with a mind that is constantly losing things, Barbara begins to put labels, instructions and reminders everywhere — on bottles, doors, the telephone. George discovers a note she has been carrying up her sleeve. On it, Barbara has written "George".

One day, George finds a letter among Barbara's gardening tools. It is the notification that Barbara has won the Longfellow Award. It requests that Barbara accept her prize at an awards ceremony and, of course, deliver an acceptance speech. Barbara's son argues that his mother shouldn't say anything at the ceremony because she'll make a fool of herself. But Barbara is determined not only to go but to read the acceptance speech that she herself will write.

On the night of the awards presentation, Barbara forgets some friends' names but seems to have summoned up every unused bit of mental acuity she has. When the emcee finishes introducing Barbara, all eyes are on her, waiting for her to take her place in history. Barbara goes to the podium, but then freezes. Her mind betrays her. Realizing Barbara cannot make her speech, George goes quickly to the podium and introduces himself. George tells the audience that Barbara has Alzheimer's disease and that he will read the words that Barbara has written. It's all he can do to hold it together when he gets to the end of his wife's speech: "I've lived better than anyone I know. I've had the rare chance to say every damn thing I ever wanted to say. And people listened. Most of all I have been loved. As laughter is our purest invention, love is our purest gift. Though I have forgotten many things, I do still remember love."

== Reception ==
Following its broadcast in 1985, the film was honored with the Emmy Award for Outstanding Drama/Comedy Special. Vickie Patik was honored with the Emmy Award for Outstanding Writing in a Limited Series or a Special, as well as the Writers Guild Award for Original Drama Anthropology. Joanne Woodward received the Emmy Award for Outstanding Lead Actress in a Drama or Comedy Special Emmy for her role as Barbara Wyatt-Hollis. Additional honors include the Humanitas Prize and the Peabody Award.

== Cast ==
- Joanne Woodward as Barbara Wyatt-Hollis
- Richard Kiley as George Hollis
- Geraldine Fitzgerald as Lorraine Wyatt
- Jerry Hardin as Dave McDonough
- Ron Rifkin as Gerry Kaplan
- Jim Metzler as Tom Hollis
- Andrea Barber as Jennifer
- Judith Barsi as Kathleen

== Production ==
- Jeff Bleckner, director
- Vickie Patik, screenwriter
- Dave Bell, executive producer
- Marilyn Hall, co-executive producer
- Walter Halsey Davis, co-producer
- James Thompson, producer
- Wayne Threm, producer
- David Shire, original music
