= Nell Newman =

American actress

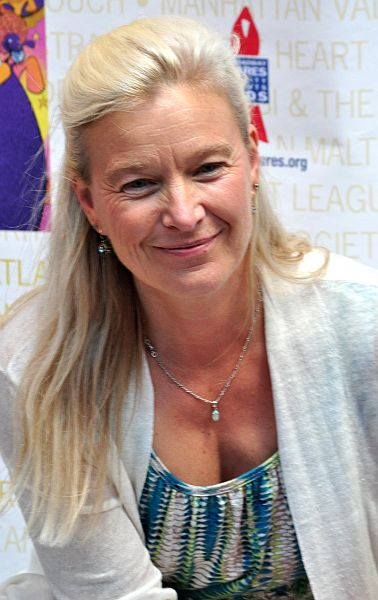
- Nell Newman in 2011
- Born: Elinor Teresa Newman; April 8, 1959 (age 67); New York City, U.S.
- Other name: Nell Potts
- Education: College of the Atlantic
- Occupations: Actress; biologist; philanthropist; entrepreneur
- Years active: 1968–present
- Spouse: Gary Irving (m. 2005)
- Parents: Paul Newman (father); Joanne Woodward (mother)
- Relatives: Melissa Newman (sister); Scott Newman (half-brother)

Elinor Teresa Newman (born April 8, 1959) is an American former child actress who performed under the name of Nell Potts. She is an environmentalist, biologist, and a prominent supporter of sustainable agriculture, who became an entrepreneur when she founded an organic food and pet food production company, Newman's Own Organics.

== Early life ==
Born in New York City, she is the eldest child of actress Joanne Woodward and actor Paul Newman. She has two sisters from that marriage and three half-siblings from her father's first marriage. She is a graduate of The Putney School in Putney, Vermont. She attended the College of the Atlantic in Bar Harbor, Maine, from which she graduated in 1987.

== Film career ==
She worked professionally as an actress during the 1960s and 1970s. Under the direction of her father, she played the title character as a child in Rachel, Rachel (1968), in which her mother, Joanne Woodward, portrayed the adult Rachel. In the next decade she starred in the film The Effect of Gamma Rays on Man-in-the-Moon Marigolds (1972), which featured her mother as a central character and which was directed by her father.

== Newman's Own Organics ==
Following her education in human ecology at the College of the Atlantic, she worked for fundraising institutions until 1993, when she founded Newman’s Own Organics using the same ideals she'd learned from her father regarding philanthropy. Newman's Own Organics was a snack and pet food manufacturing company specializing in organic products that became a national brand. Royalties paid by Newman's Own Organics, for use of the Newman name and image, support the charitable activities of Newman's Own Foundation.

Her work in organic food was initially inspired by a childhood awareness that her favorite bird, the Peregrine Falcon, was heading for extinction due to the use of DDT, a pervasive chemical pesticide applied to agricultural crops. DDT works its way through the food chain, from insects to birds and rodents up to top predators such as falcons and hawks. Nell’s passion for birds specifically and nature generally led her to pursue a degree in Ecology, so she could better understand natural systems and how they interact with the human landscape.

Additionally, having been raised in rural Connecticut she grew up eating vegetables from her mother’s garden and made pies out of apples picked from their trees, which contributed greatly to her work in sustainable agriculture and organic food.

She has a long friendship with Alice Waters, the owner of the restaurant Chez Panisse and has remarked that, "With Alice Waters I had the unquestionable proof that organic food doesn't have to taste like 'health food'. As a matter of fact, organic food tastes better." Following that line of thought, "Great-tasting products that happen to be organic" became the slogan of Newman's Own Organics.

Her father died of lung cancer on September 26, 2008. He had participated in the business, most importantly by lending his name and image as a boost to the fledgling business that began as a division of Newman's Own, founded in 1982. In 2014, her license with Newman's Own was not renewed and Nell moved on to pursue her ongoing commitment to conservation, organic farming and philanthropy.

She and her father were featured together in many of its marketing campaigns, often posed to resemble American Gothic, an iconic painting by Grant Wood.

== Personal life ==
Newman has been married to Gary Irving since 2005. They reside in California. She is a flexitarian.

== Awards ==
In 2014, Newman received the prestigious Rachel Carson Award from The National Audubon Society for her environmental leadership. In 2017, Newman was inducted into the Specialty Food Hall of Fame, which “honor(s) individuals whose accomplishments, impact, contributions, innovations, and successes within the specialty food industry deserve praise and recognition.”
