= See How She Runs =

1978 American TV film

- Genre: Drama; Sport
- Written by: Marvin A. Gluck
- Directed by: Richard T. Heffron
- Starring: Joanne Woodward; John Considine; Barnard Hughes
- Theme music composer: Jimmie Haskell
- Country of origin: United States
- Original language: English

Production
- Producer: George Englund
- Production locations: Boston; Hopkinton, Massachusetts
- Cinematography: Ronald M. Lautore
- Editor: Gary Griffin
- Running time: 96 min.
- Production company: CLN Productions Inc.

Original release
- Network: CBS
- Release: February 1, 1978

See How She Runs is a 1978 American TV film starring Joanne Woodward, who won an Emmy for her performance. The film also won Emmys for Outstanding Achievement in Music Composition for a Special (Dramatic Underscore) and Outstanding Achievement in Film Sound Mixing.

== Plot ==
A 40 year old divorced school teacher decides to enter the Boston Marathon.

== Production ==
At one stage the film was going to be directed by Paul Newman.

== Reception ==
The film was seen by 35 million people.
