= Joanne Woodward =

American actress (born 1930)

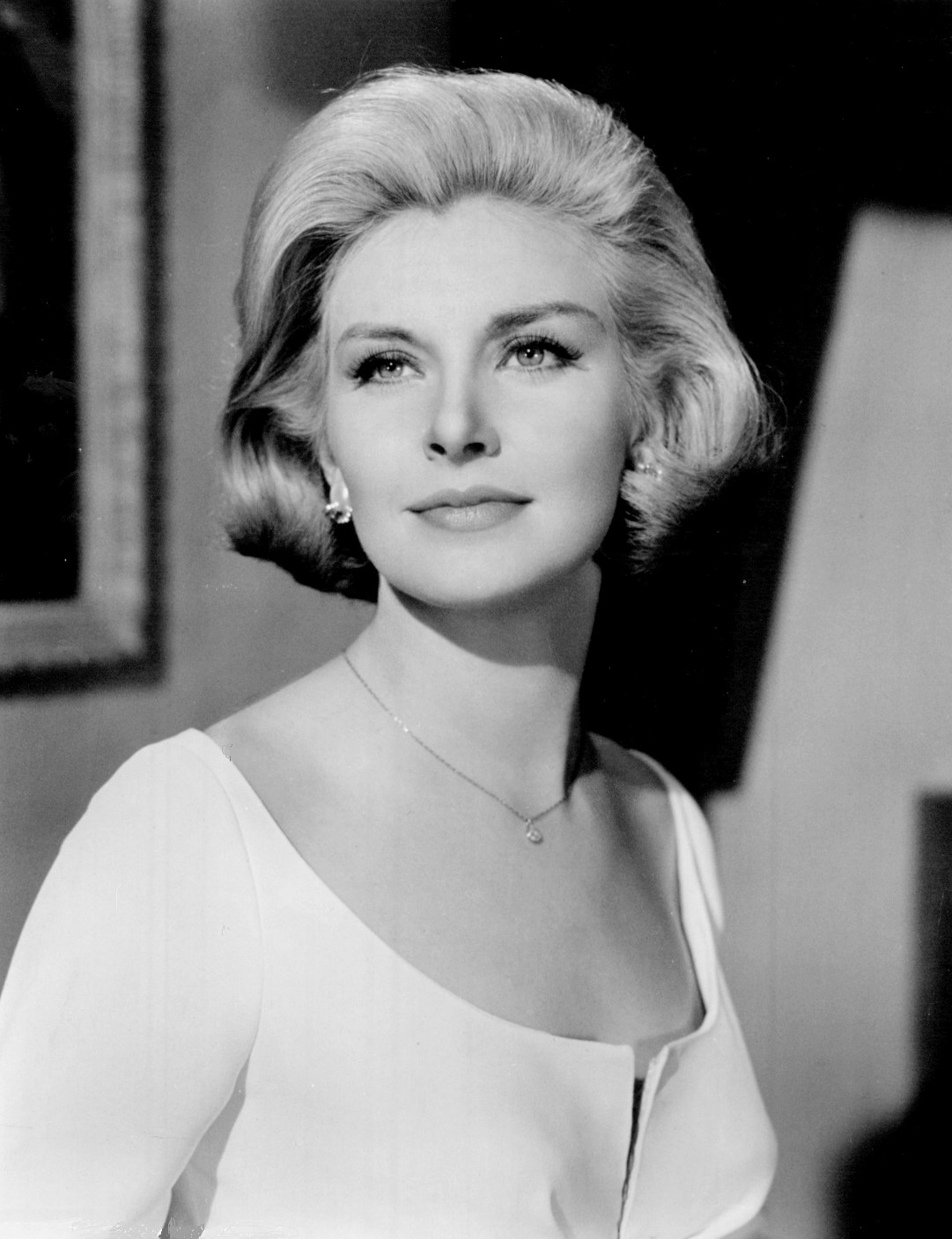
- Woodward in 1964
- Born: Joanne Gignilliat Trimmier Woodward; February 27, 1930 (age 96); Thomasville, Georgia, U.S.
- Other names: Joanne Newman; Joanne G. T. Woodward
- Education: Louisiana State University; Actors Studio; Neighborhood Playhouse School of the Theatre; Sarah Lawrence College
- Occupation: Actress
- Years active: 1952–2013
- Spouse: Paul Newman (m. 1958; died 2008)
- Children: Three, including Nell and Melissa Newman
- Awards: Full list

Joanne Gignilliat Trimmier Woodward (born February 27, 1930) is an American retired actress. She made her career breakthrough in the 1950s and earned esteem and respect playing complex women with a characteristic nuance and depth of character. Her accolades include an Academy Award, three Primetime Emmy Awards, a British Academy Film Award, three Golden Globe Awards, and a Screen Actors Guild Award.

Woodward is perhaps best known for her performance as a woman with dissociative identity disorder in The Three Faces of Eve (1957), which earned her an Academy Award for Best Actress and a Golden Globe Award for Best Actress in a Motion Picture – Drama. Until his death in 2008, she was married for fifty years to actor Paul Newman, with whom she often collaborated either as a co-star, or as an actor in films directed or produced by him. In 1990, Woodward earned a bachelor's degree from Sarah Lawrence College at age 60, graduating alongside her daughter Clea. To date, at 96, Woodward is the oldest living Best Actress Oscar winner after the death of Olivia de Havilland in July 2020..

== Early life ==
Joanne Gignilliat Trimmier Woodward was born on February 27, 1930, in Thomasville, Georgia, the daughter of Elinor (née Trimmier) and Wade Woodward Sr. Her middle names, "Gignilliat Trimmier", are of Huguenot origin. She was influenced to become an actress by her mother's love of film. Her mother named her after Joan Crawford. She has an older brother, Wade, Jr.

Attending the premiere of Gone with the Wind in Atlanta, nine-year-old Woodward rushed into the parade of stars and sat on the lap of Laurence Olivier, star Vivien Leigh's partner. She eventually worked with Olivier in 1977 in a television production of Come Back, Little Sheba. During rehearsals, she mentioned this incident to him, and he told her he remembered.

Woodward lived in Thomasville, then lived in Blakely and Thomaston before her family relocated to Marietta, Georgia, where she attended Marietta High School. She remains a supporter of Marietta High School and of the city's Strand Theater.

The family moved once again to Greenville, South Carolina, when she was a junior in high school, after her parents divorced. She attended and graduated from Greenville High School. She also performed at Greenville's Little Theater.

Woodward majored in drama at Louisiana State University, where she was an initiate of Chi Omega sorority, then headed to New York City to perform on the stage. There, she studied at the Actors Studio and also studied under Sanford Meisner in the Neighborhood Playhouse School of the Theatre.

== Career ==
=== Early career ===
Woodward in The Three Faces of Eve (1957), displaying "Eve Black", the "bad girl" personality

In 1952, Woodward made her first television appearance on an episode of Robert Montgomery Presents titled "Penny". She also auditioned for roles on the stage, becoming an understudy during the run of the William Inge drama Picnic in 1953–1954. It was there that she met her future husband Paul Newman, although at that time he was still married to his first wife, Jacqueline Witte.

Woodward appeared in many other TV drama shows such as Tales of Tomorrow, Goodyear Playhouse, Danger, The Philco-Goodyear Television Playhouse, You Are There, The Web, The Ford Television Theatre, The Elgin Hour, Robert Montgomery Presents, Armstrong Circle Theatre, The Star and the Story, Omnibus, Star Tonight, and Ponds Theater.

Woodward's first feature film was a post–Civil War Western, Count Three and Pray (1955). Woodward was billed second, and played a strong-willed orphan. She was signed to a long-term contract by 20th Century Fox in January 1956. For her next role, she starred in A Kiss Before Dying (1956) as an heiress pursued by a college student (Robert Wagner) who will stop at nothing to win her over.

Woodward's career included TV, stage and feature film acting. In 1956 she returned to Broadway to star in The Lovers. It had only a brief run (but was later filmed as The War Lord (1965)). She also appeared on television drama shows including Philco Playhouse, The 20th Century-Fox Hour, The United States Steel Hour, General Electric Theater, Four Star Playhouse, Alfred Hitchcock Presents, Kraft Theatre, The Alcoa Hour, Studio One in Hollywood, and Climax.

=== Film stardom ===
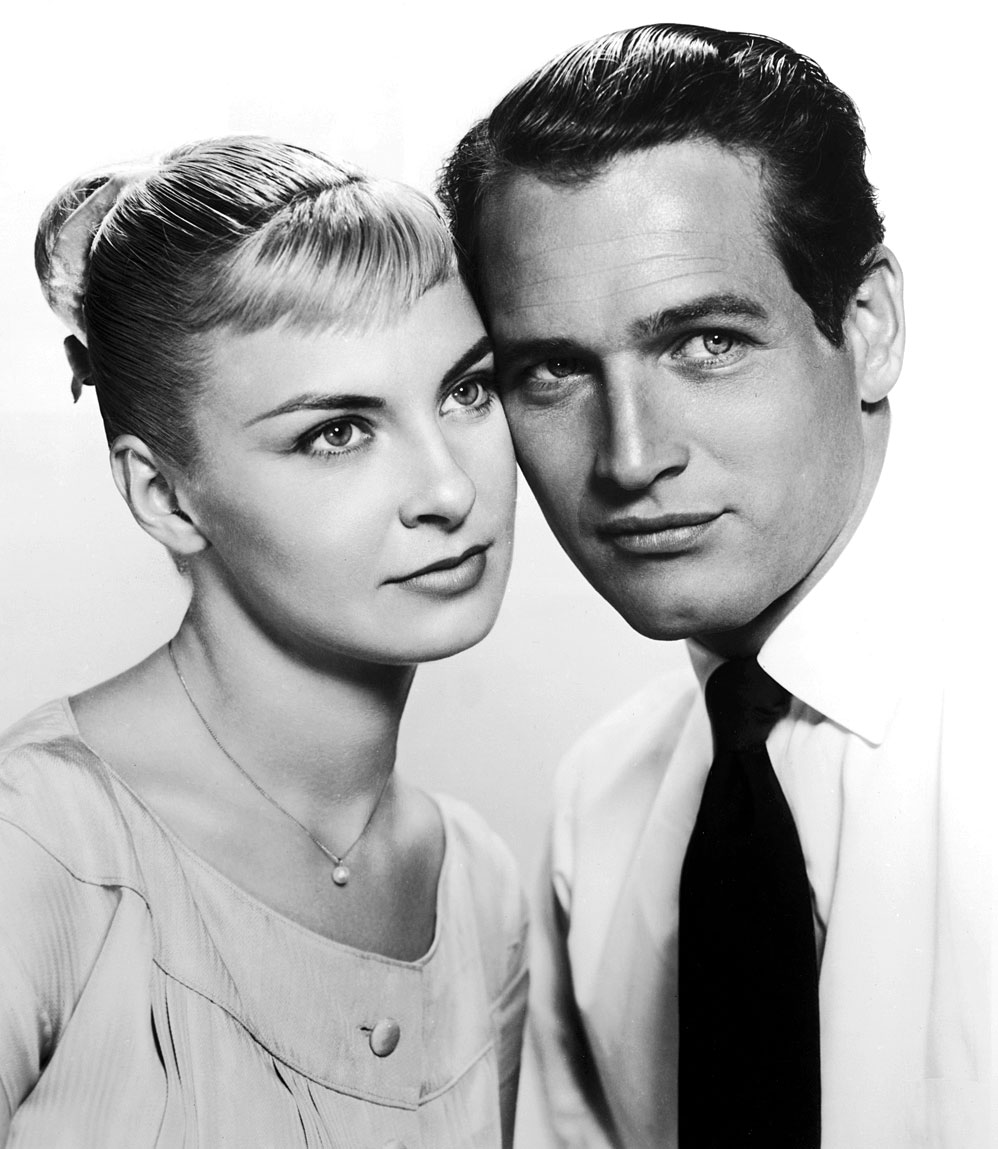
Woodward and her husband, actor Paul Newman, in a publicity photograph for the 1958 film The Long, Hot Summer

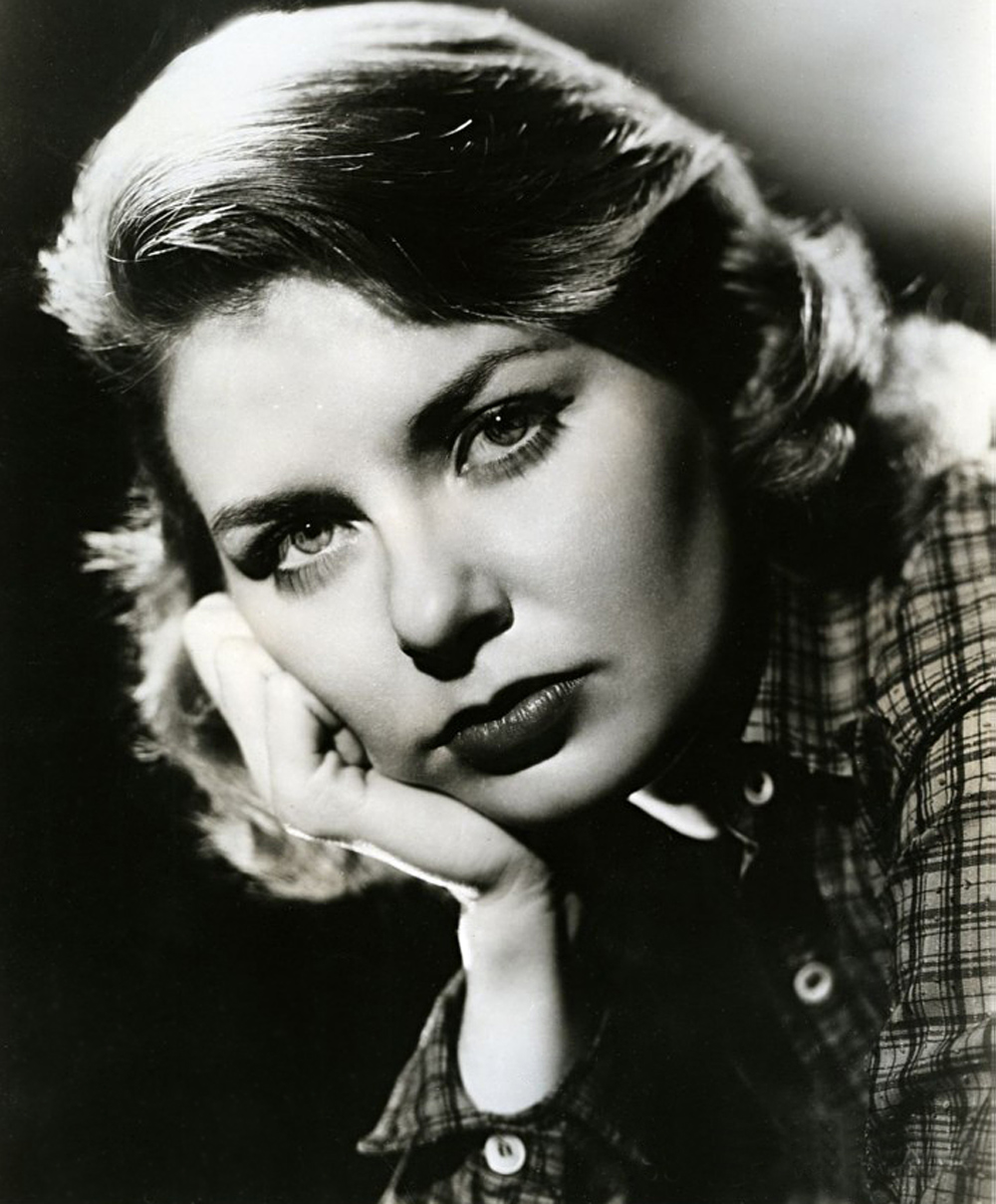
Publicity photo, 1960

In 1957, Woodward astounded audiences and critics alike with her performance in The Three Faces of Eve. She portrayed a woman with three distinct personalities — a southern housewife, a sexually voracious "bad girl", and a young woman — and gave each their own unique voices and gestures. For her work on the film, Woodward won an Academy Award for Best Actress in a dress she sewed herself, the only Best Actress winner to date to do so.

With Woodward's credentials as a star attraction established, Fox gave her top billing in No Down Payment (1957), directed by Martin Ritt and produced by Jerry Wald. She was re-united with Ritt on another Faulkner adaptation, The Sound and the Fury (1959), with Yul Brynner. Sidney Lumet cast Woodward alongside Marlon Brando and Anna Magnani in The Fugitive Kind (1960), a box office disappointment. More popular was a third film with Newman, From the Terrace (1960), which Woodward later admitted to having "affection" for "because of the way I looked like Lana Turner". The couple then made Paris Blues (1961) with Ritt. For her title role in The Stripper (1963), Joanne was coached in technique by burlesque performer Gypsy Rose Lee. In 1966, she appeared as Mary in A Big Hand for the Little Lady, and starred alongside Sean Connery in A Fine Madness. In Rachel Rachel (1968), produced and directed by Newman, Woodward played a schoolteacher hoping for love. This film won her an Academy Award nomination for Best Actress.

In 1972, Woodward starred in The Effect of Gamma Rays on Man-in-the-Moon Marigolds. For this performance as a single mother challenged by her daughters (one of them played by her actual daughter, Nell), she won the Best Actress Award at the Cannes Film Festival. She then starred in the mid-life crisis drama Summer Wishes, Winter Dreams (1973), written by Stewart Stern, for which she received another Oscar nomination for Best Actress.

Woodward was to have co-starred with Robert Shaw in Strindberg's The Dance of Death at Lincoln Center in 1974, but withdrew from the production during rehearsals. "New York puts a pressure on you that I don't react well to, with the critics and all that," she later said. "I like to act in a relaxed atmosphere."

Woodward supported Burt Reynolds in The End (1978), and as the '70s progressed did more television drama. She did A Christmas to Remember (1979) on TV. The decade ended with The Streets of L.A. (1979). Woodward also directed an episode of Family in 1979. For TV, she appeared in Come Back, Little Sheba (1977) with Laurence Olivier, and See How She Runs (1978). The latter won her an Emmy.

Woodward's credits in the 1980s included The Shadow Box (1980), directed by Newman, and Crisis at Central High (1981) for TV. She also returned to Broadway for Candida (1981–1982), a production directed by Michael Cristofer that was filmed in 1982. She starred in Harry & Son (1984), again directed by and co-starring Newman, and some television films, Passions (1984) and Do You Remember Love (1985). Woodward also did some screenwriting and direction at this time, for instance writing and directing a 1982 production of Shirley Jackson's story Come Along with Me; and starred in The Glass Menagerie (1987).

Woodward also found critical success on the small screen. She won Emmy Awards for her work as an actress on See How She Runs (1978) and Do You Remember Love? (1985). As a producer, she won another Emmy for Broadway's dreamers: The Legacy of the Group Theater in 1990. Woodward also returned to TV to do "The 80 Yard Run" for Playhouse 90.

=== Partnership with Paul Newman ===
Woodward met Paul Newman on the set of the stage drama Picnic in the early 1950s and the two married on January 29, 1958, after his divorce from his first wife Jacqueline Witte was finalized. Woodward was soon an Academy Award winner, winning her Oscar on March 28. Although he was nominated many times, Newman did not achieve a win until 1986. Woodward and Newman worked together on many projects, including films where they costarred, or where he was the director or producer.

Woodward and Newman appeared in many films together during the 1950s and '60s. The first was The Long Hot Summer (1958), followed by Rally 'Round the Flag, Boys! (1958), From the Terrace (1960), Paris Blues (1961), and A New Kind of Love (1963). They returned to Broadway in Baby Want a Kiss (1964), which ran for more than a hundred performances. Woodward was also directed by her husband in many projects. The first of these was Newman's directorial debut, Rachel, Rachel (1968). Husband and wife both earned Golden Globe Awards and Oscar nominations. They also acted together in Winning (1969), WUSA (1970) and The Drowning Pool (1975). Woodward also collaborated with her daughters, appearing with Nell in The Effect of Gamma Rays on Man-in-the-Moon Marigolds (1972), which was directed by Paul Newman, and with Melissa in the TV movie See How She Runs (1978).

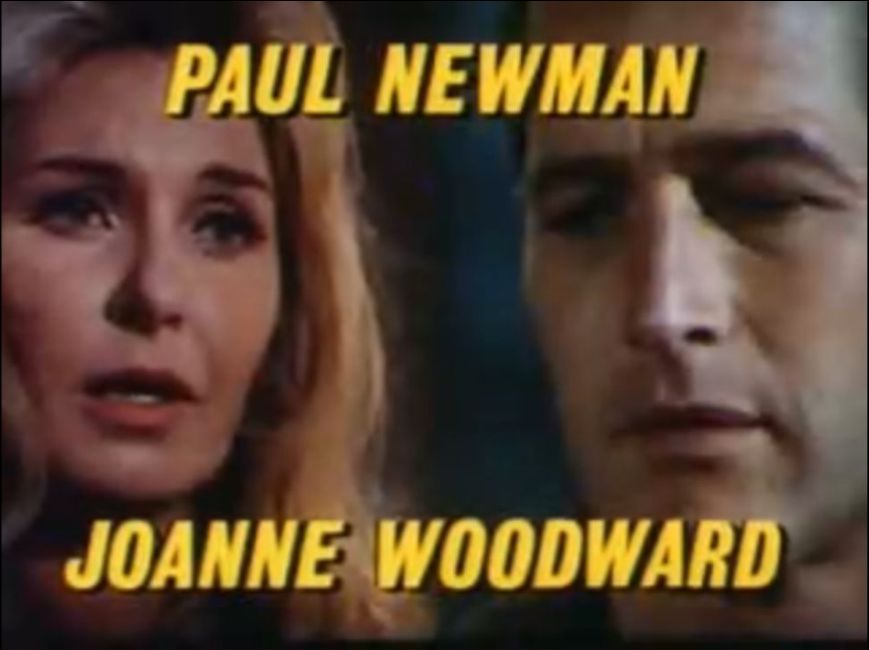
Paul Newman and Joanne Woodward in Winning (1969)

Only two months after their wedding, Woodward won her first Academy Award. Newman earned his first nomination later that year, in 1959, for Cat On a Hot Tin Roof (1958). Both at the top of their game as film stars, Woodward and Newman became a celebrity power couple and were featured in countless magazines and articles for the next fifty years. Woodward's family life, she felt, deepened at the expense of her film career. She later said:

Initially, I probably had a real movie-star dream. It faded somewhere in my mid-30s, when I realized I wasn't going to be that kind of actor. It was painful. Also, I curtailed my career because of my children. Quite a bit. I resented it at the time, which was not a good way to be around the children. Paul was away on location a lot. I wouldn't go on location because of the children. I did once, and felt overwhelmed with guilt.

Woodward's final screen performance with Newman (and last appearance to date, excluding voiceover roles) was in the 2005 cable miniseries Empire Falls.

=== Later years ===
In 1987, Woodward began a three-season stint as the host of Live from the Met, a PBS show focused on performances of classic operas. Woodward would introduce the opera, interview performers and the conductor, and give insight into the opera being telecast.

In 1990, Woodward again appeared opposite Newman in Mr. & Mrs. Bridge (1990), directed by James Ivory. Woodward had read this, the first of Evan S. Connell's two novels, when it was published in 1959. She hoped for many years to adapt it into a television production. Originally, she did not intend to play the character of Mrs. Bridge because she was too young. By the late 1980s, that was no longer the case. One of her most acclaimed performances, she garnered her fourth Academy Award nomination, and was selected as the year's Best Actress at the New York Film Critics Circle Awards.

In 1993, Woodward appeared in the film Philadelphia, with Tom Hanks, and, in the same year, narrated Martin Scorsese's The Age of Innocence. Woodward did two additional television films: Foreign Affairs (1993) and Blind Spot (1993). Woodward was a co-producer of Blind Spot, a drama about drug addiction, for which she was nominated for an Emmy Award for Outstanding Lead Actress – Mini-Series or a Movie. She co-starred in the television film Breathing Lessons (1995). Also in 1995, Woodward directed off-Broadway revivals of Clifford Odets' Golden Boy and Waiting for Lefty at the Blue Light Theater Company in New York.

In the twenty-first century, Woodward moved more into production and directorial roles. She served as the artistic director of the Westport Country Playhouse from 2001 to 2005. She was executive producer of the 2003 television production of Our Town, featuring Newman as the stage manager (for which he was nominated for an Emmy Award). She and Newman also appeared in Empire Falls (2005) for TV. Woodward also recorded a reading of singer John Mellencamp's song "The Real Life" for his box set On the Rural Route 7609.

Woodward had the lead in Change in the Wind (2010). In 2011, she narrated the Scholastic/Weston Woods film All the World.

In 2022, Woodward and Newman were the subject of a six-part documentary by Ethan Hawke, The Last Movie Stars, which premiered on HBO Max.

== Personal life ==
Woodward was reported to have been engaged to author Gore Vidal before she married Paul Newman. There was no real engagement; Woodward claims that she was a "beard" for Vidal, who was gay. Woodward shared a house with Vidal in Los Angeles for a short time and they remained friends.

Woodward first met Newman at their agent's office. They were understudies for the play Picnic in 1953. In the midst of this they starred in The Long, Hot Summer in 1957. Newman divorced his wife Jackie Witte, with whom he already had three children, and married Woodward on January 29, 1958, in Las Vegas. On March 28 of the same year, Woodward won the Academy Award for Best Actress for The Three Faces of Eve. The couple remained married for 50 years until Newman's death from lung cancer on September 26, 2008. Woodward has said, "He's very good-looking and very sexy and all of those things but all that goes out the window finally, and what finally is left is if you can make somebody laugh. And he sure does keep me laughing". Newman attributed their relationship success to "some combination of lust and respect and patience. And determination".

When Paul Newman was asked, in an interview with Playboy magazine, how he remained faithful to Woodward, Newman responded, "I have steak at home; why go out for hamburger?" Woodward has three daughters with Newman, Elinor Teresa "Nell" (1959), Melissa Stewart (1961) and Claire Olivia "Clea" (1965).

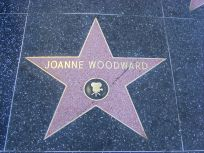
Woodward's Hollywood Walk of Fame star

Woodward took up ballet in her thirties as a way to stay in shape, eventually going en pointe. Woodward and Newman were mentors to Allison Janney, whom they had met when Janney, a Kenyon College freshman, was cast in a play that Newman directed. Janney acknowledged this support in her Oscar speech.

Woodward and Newman were supporters of the Democratic Party. They were conspicuous supporters of Senator Eugene McCarthy in his unsuccessful 1968 presidential campaign, attending a benefit for his campaign at Arthur's Restaurant on April 1, 1968. Documents declassified in 2017 show that the National Security Agency had created a biographical file on Woodward as part of its monitoring of prominent US citizens whose names appeared in signals intelligence.

In 1988, Newman and Woodward established the Hole in the Wall Gang Camp, a nonprofit residential summer camp, and year-round center named after the Wyoming mountain hideaway of the outlaws in Newman's film Butch Cassidy and the Sundance Kid. The camp, located in Ashford, Connecticut, provides free services to 20,000 children and their families coping with cancer and other serious illnesses. In 2012, their daughter Clea Newman took charge of the camp's parent organization, the SeriousFun Children's Network.

In 1990, after working toward her bachelor's degree for more than 10 years, Woodward graduated from Sarah Lawrence College along with her daughter Clea. Paul Newman delivered the commencement address, during which he said he dreamed that a woman had asked, "How dare you accept this invitation to give the commencement address when you are merely hanging on to the coattails of the accomplishments of your wife?" In 1992, along with Newman, Woodward was awarded the Kennedy Center honors for lifetime achievement.

Woodward, widowed since 2008, lived for many years in Westport, Connecticut, where she and Newman raised their daughters. She retreated from public life following a diagnosis of Alzheimer's disease in 2007. She relocated to Santa Monica, California to be near her daughters following her diagnosis. Woodward last appeared publicly in 2013.

== Acting credits ==
=== Film ===
Year	Title	Role	Notes
1955	Count Three and Pray	Lissy	
1956	A Kiss Before Dying	Dorothy "Dorie" Kingship	
1957	The Three Faces of Eve	Eve White / Eve Black / Jane	
1957	No Down Payment	Leola Boone	
1958	The Long, Hot Summer	Clara Varner	
1958	Rally Round the Flag, Boys!	Grace Oglethorpe Bannerman	
1959	The Sound and the Fury	Quentin Compson / Narrator	
1960	The Fugitive Kind	Carol Cutrere	
1960	From the Terrace	Mary St. John	
1961	Paris Blues	Lillian Corning	
1963	The Stripper	Lila Green	
1963	A New Kind of Love	Samantha "Sam" Blake / Mimi	
1964	Signpost to Murder	Molly Thomas	
1966	A Big Hand for the Little Lady	Mary	
1966	A Fine Madness	Rhoda Shillitoe	
1968	Rachel, Rachel	Rachel Cameron	
1969	Winning	Elora Capua	
1970	WUSA	Geraldine	
1971	They Might Be Giants	Dr. Mildred Watson	
1972	The Effect of Gamma Rays on Man-in-the-Moon Marigolds	Beatrice Hunsdorfer	
1973	Summer Wishes, Winter Dreams	Rita Walden	
1975	The Drowning Pool	Iris Devereaux	
1978	The End	Jessica Lawson	
1984	Harry & Son	Lilly	
1987	The Glass Menagerie	Amanda Wingfield	
1990	Mr. & Mrs. Bridge	India Bridge	
1993	The Age of Innocence	Narrator	Voice
1993	Philadelphia	Sarah Beckett	
1996	Even If a Hundred Ogres...	Narrator	Voice
2010	Change in the Wind	Margaret Mitchell	Voice
2012	Gayby	Jenn's Mother	Voice, uncredited
2013	Lucky Them	Doris	Voice, also executive producer

=== Television ===
Year	Title	Role	Notes
1952	Tales of Tomorrow	Pat	Episode: "The Bitter Storm"
1952–1953	Omnibus	Ann Rutledge	Episode: "Mr. Lincoln"
1953–1954	The Philco Television Playhouse	Emily	Episode: "The Dancers"
1954	The Ford Television Theatre	June Ledbetter	Episode: "Segment"
1954	The Elgin Hour	Nancy	Episode: "High Man"
1954	Lux Video Theatre	Jenny Townsend	Episode: "Five Star Final"
1952–1954	Robert Montgomery Presents	Elsie / Penny	2 episodes
1955	The Star and the Story	Jill Andrews	Episode: "Dark Stranger"
1955	The 20th Century Fox Hour	Eleanor Apley	Episode: "The Late George Apley"
1955	The United States Steel Hour	Rocky	Episode: "White Gloves"
1954–1956	Four Star Playhouse	Ann Benton / Terry Thomas / Victoria	3 episodes
1954–1956	Studio One	Christiana / Daisy / Lisa	3 episodes
1956	Alfred Hitchcock Presents	Beth Paine	Season 1 Episode 39: "Momentum"
1956	GE True	Ann Rutledge	Episode: "Prologue to Glory"
1956	The Alcoa Hour	Margaret Spencer	Episode: "The Girl in Chapter One"
1956	Climax!	Katherine	Episode: "Savage Portrait"
1958	Playhouse 90	Louise Darling	Episode: "The 80 Yard Run"
1971	All the Way Home	Mary Follet	Television film
1976	The Carol Burnett Show	Midge Gibson	Episode: "The Family: Friend from the Past"
1976	Sybil	Dr. Cornelia B. Wilbur	Miniseries
1977	Come Back, Little Sheba	Lola Delaney	Television film
1978	See How She Runs	Betty Quinn	Television film
1978	A Christmas to Remember	Mildred McCloud	Television film
1979	The Streets of L.A.	Carol Schramm	Television film
1980	The Shadow Box	Beverly	Television film
1981	Crisis at Central High	Elizabeth Huckaby	Television film
1982	Candida	Candida	Television film
1984	Passions	Catherine Kennerly	Television film
1985	Do You Remember Love	Barbara Wyatt-Hollis	Television film
1993	Foreign Affairs	Vinnie Miner	Television film
1993	Blind Spot	Nell Harrington	Television film
1993	The Roots of Woe	Margaret Sanger	Voice, television film
1994	Breathing Lessons	Maggie Moran	Television film
2003	Our Town	N/A	Television film, executive producer
2005	Empire Falls	Francine Whiting	Miniseries

=== Theater ===
Year	Title	Role	Playwright	Venue	Ref.
1955	The Lovers	Douane	Leslie Stevens	Martin Beck Theatre, Broadway	
1964	Baby Want a Kiss	Mavis	James Costigan	Little Theatre, Broadway	
1981	Candida	Candida	George Bernard Shaw	Circle in the Square, Broadway	
2002	Our Town	Artistic Director	Thorton Wilder	Booth Theatre, Broadway	

== Awards and nominations ==
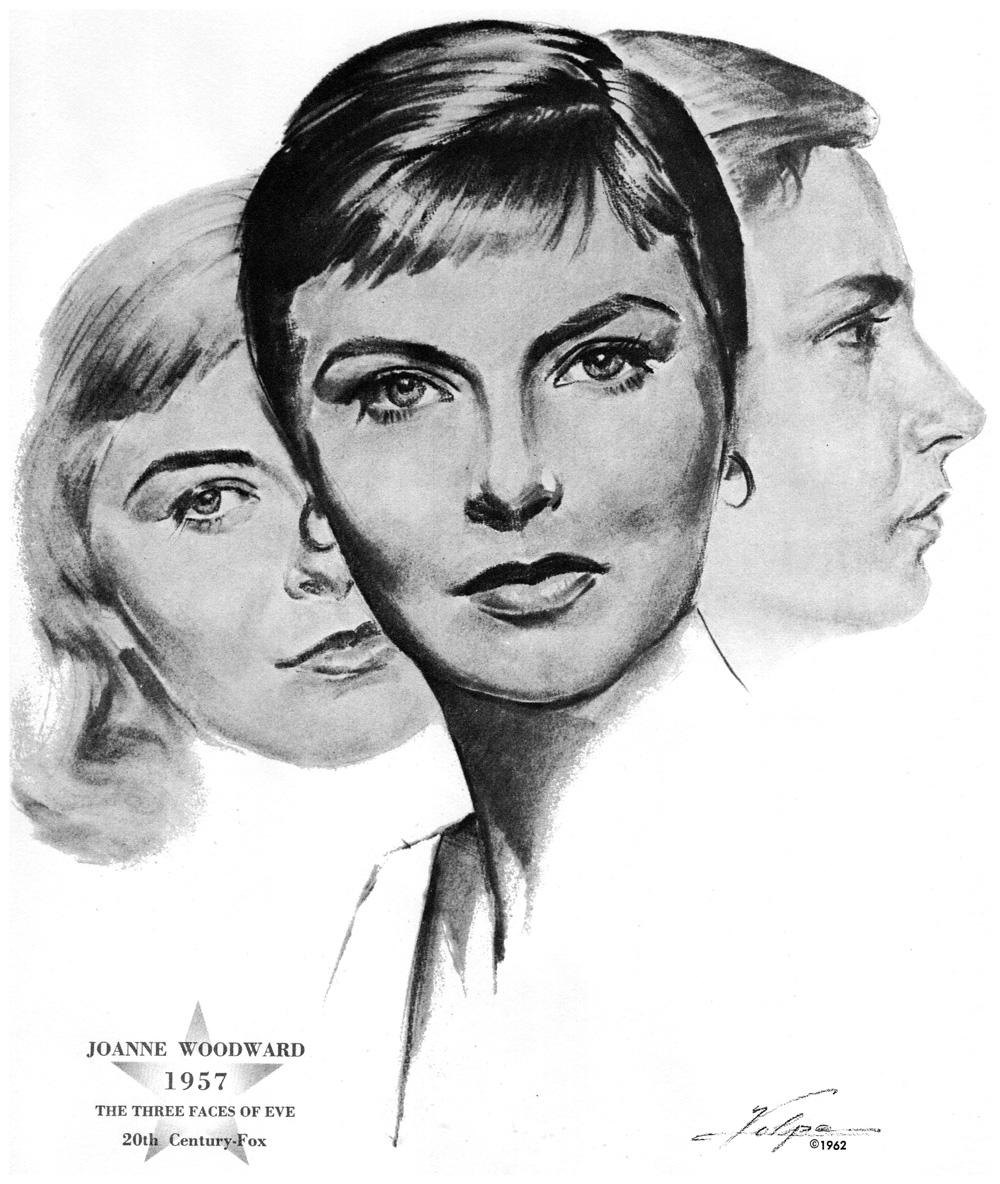
Drawing of Woodward upon winning an Oscar for The Three Faces of Eve in 1957 by artist Nicholas Volpe

In 1958, Woodward won the Academy Award for Best Actress for The Three Faces of Eve. In 1960, she won the Silver Shell for Best Actress at the San Sebastián International Film Festival for her work on The Fugitive Kind . She was nominated for Best Actress in 1969 for Rachel, Rachel; in 1974 for Summer Wishes, Winter Dreams; and in 1991 for Mr. & Mrs. Bridge. She was named Best Actress at the Cannes Film Festival in 1974 for her performance in The Effect of Gamma Rays on Man-in-the-Moon Marigolds.

Woodward won 2 Primetime Emmy Award for Outstanding Lead Actress in a Limited or Anthology Series or Movie: for See How She Runs as a divorced teacher who trains for a marathon; and in Do You Remember Love as a professor who begins to suffer from Alzheimer's disease. She has been nominated an additional 5 times for her roles on TV.

A popular (but untrue) bit of Hollywood lore is that Woodward was the first celebrity to receive a star on the Hollywood Walk of Fame. In fact, the original 1,550 stars were created and installed as a unit in 1960; no one star was officially "first". The first star actually completed was director Stanley Kramer's. The origin of this legend is not known with certainty, but according to Johnny Grant, the long-time Honorary Mayor of Hollywood, Woodward was the first celebrity to agree to pose with her star for photographers, and therefore was singled out in the collective public imagination as the first awardee.

In 1994, Joanne Woodward and Paul Newman were jointly presented the Award for Outstanding Public Service Benefiting the Disadvantaged, an award given out annually by Jefferson Awards for Public Service.
