= Rally Round the Flag, Boys! =

1958 film by Leo McCarey

- Theatrical release poster
- Directed by: Leo McCarey
- Screenplay by: Claude Binyon; Leo McCarey
- Based on: Rally Round the Flag, Boys! 1957 novel by Max Shulman
- Produced by: Leo McCarey
- Starring: Paul Newman; Joanne Woodward; Joan Collins; Jack Carson
- Cinematography: Leon Shamroy
- Edited by: Louis R. Loeffler
- Music by: Cyril J. Mockridge
- Distributed by: 20th Century Fox
- Release date: December 23, 1958
- Running time: 106 minutes
- Country: United States
- Language: English
- Budget: $1.9 million
- Box office: $3.4 million (US/Canada rentals)

Rally Round the Flag, Boys! is a 1958 American comedy film directed by Leo McCarey from a screenplay he co-wrote with Claude Binyon, based on the 1957 novel of the same name by Max Shulman. Released by 20th Century Fox, the film stars Paul Newman, Joanne Woodward, Joan Collins, and Jack Carson. The title comes from a line in the song "Battle Cry of Freedom".

== Plot ==
In the fictional suburban commuter town of Putnam's Landing, Connecticut, public relations specialist Harry Bannerman is slowly going insane because his wife Grace insists on attending every local civic committee meeting. When the government selects the town for the site of a new missile base, Grace joins a committee to prevent it from being built.

Harry is made the liaison for the military, and Grace's activities cause him no end of trouble. Adding to the dilemma is Angela Hoffa, whose efforts to get Harry for herself lead to dizzying recriminations and misunderstandings.

== Cast ==
- Paul Newman as Harry Bannerman
- Joanne Woodward as Grace Bannerman
- Joan Collins as Angela Hoffa
- Murvyn Vye as Oscar Hoffa
- Jack Carson as Captain Hoxie
- Tuesday Weld as Comfort Goodpasture
- Dwayne Hickman as Grady Metcalf, Comfort's suitor
- Gale Gordon as General Thorwald
- Tom Gilson as Corporal Opie
- O.Z. Whitehead as Isaac Goodpasture, Comfort's Father
- Stanley Livingston as Peter Bannerman
- Percy Helton as Waldo Pike, the plumber
- Joseph Holland as Manning Thaw
- David Hedison as narrator (voice only)

== Production ==
George Axelrod worked on the script for a year with McCarey. He later recalled they came up with an approach to do the film "but it was too far out for Buddy Adler", the head of production at Fox:

Max Shulman's book was a very funny book, and very literary, in that he used literary devices – which don't often translate to the screen very well. The story itself was rather boring, but the author's comments were funny. So I invented a narrator, named Max, who wove the film together. It was a throwback to the old Pete Smith comedy shorts. But they hated the idea of narration – just as they hate the idea of fantasy – so they threw it out. And then I had to spend a lot of time getting my name off the picture, because I don't want my name on something I didn't write.

Production on Rally Round the Flag, Boys! started in mid-June 1958 and ended in mid-August. The role of Captain Hoxie was originally going to be portrayed by Paul Douglas, but was taken over by Jack Carson after Douglas fell ill, according to a July 1958 The Hollywood Reporter news item.

The part of Angela was originally intended for actress Jayne Mansfield, but after intense lobbying from Paul Newman and his wife Joanne Woodward, she was replaced with Joan Collins (who had co-starred with Mansfield in The Wayward Bus).

A March 1958 item noted that actor Mickey Shaughnessy was set for a featured role; however, he did not appear in the film. A Daily Variety news item reported that in March 1958, Buddy Adler was set to produce the film, and was considering the film to star Frank Sinatra, Deborah Kerr, and William Holden.

== Release ==
Rally Round the Flag, Boys! premiered in New York City theatres on December 23, 1958. It was released nationwide in February 1959.

== Reception ==
On Rotten Tomatoes, the film holds an approval rating of 30% based on reviews from 10 critics, with an average rating of 5/10.

== Theme ==
Rally Round the Flag, Boys! presents a classic McCarey contretemps pitting socially unconventional and conventional characters of opposite sex, with an emphasis on sexuality and society as the “ultimately inseparable concerns in McCarey’s universe.” Film historian and biographer Leland Poague writes:

In every case there is a central couple, partners who display an obvious unity of personal style and emotional purpose. In each instance their unity is threatened or called into question. And in each case the threat serves to clarify the emotional value to be found in sexual union.

With Rally ‘Round the Flag, Boys!, McCarey returned to a genre with which he was familiar: screwball comedy. Biographer Wes D. Gehring discerns an echo of McCarey’s The Awful Truth (1937), with Joanne Woodward channeling screwball icon Carole Lombard. The generic screwball, involving “a disgruntled duo and a sexy third party” deviates in Rally from the formula when Cold War controversies emerge over a local nuclear missile base. Gehring notes that “classic screwball generally avoids the political.”

=== Awards ===
Rally Round the Flag, Boys! was nominated for the Golden Laurel Awards held on September 23, 1959, and received fourth place for both Top Comedy Female Performance (Joanne Woodward) and Top Comedy. Director Leo McCarey was later nominated for the Directors Guild of America Award in 1960 for Outstanding Directorial Achievement in Motion Pictures for Rally Round the Flag, Boys!.

== Sources ==
- Gehring, Wes D. 2005. Leo McCarey: From Marx to McCarthy. The Scarecrow Press. Lantham, Maryland, Toronto, Oxford. ISBN 0-8108-5263-2
- Poague, Leland. 1980. The Hollywood Professionals: Wilder and McCarey, Volume 7. The Tanvity Press, A. S. Barnes and Company, Inc. San Diego, California. ISBN 978-0498021817
