= The Effect of Gamma Rays on Man-in-the-Moon Marigolds (film) =

1972 film

- Original Poster
- Directed by: Paul Newman
- Screenplay by: Alvin Sargent
- Based on: The Effect of Gamma Rays on Man-in-the-Moon Marigolds by Paul Zindel
- Produced by: Paul Newman
- Starring: Joanne Woodward; Nell Potts; Roberta Wallach
- Cinematography: Adam Holender
- Edited by: Evan A. Lottman
- Music by: Maurice Jarre
- Distributed by: 20th Century Fox
- Release date: December 20, 1972
- Running time: 101 minutes
- Country: United States
- Language: English

The Effect of Gamma Rays on Man-in-the-Moon Marigolds is a 1972 American drama film produced and directed by Paul Newman. The screenplay by Alvin Sargent is based on the Pulitzer Prize-winning 1964 play of the same title by Paul Zindel. Newman cast his wife, Joanne Woodward, and one of their daughters, Nell Potts, in two of the lead roles. Roberta Wallach, daughter of Eli Wallach, played the third lead.

== Plot ==
Middle-aged widow Beatrice Hunsdorfer and her daughters Ruth and Matilda are struggling to survive in a society they barely understand. Beatrice dreams of opening an elegant tea room but does not have the wherewithal to achieve her lofty goal. Ruth is a rebellious adolescent who has epilepsy, while shy Matilda, highly intelligent and idealistic, seeks solace in her pets and school projects, including the one that provides the film's title.

Matilda's science experiment is designed to show how small amounts of gamma radiation from cobalt-60 affect marigolds; some die, but others transform into strange but beautiful mutations completely unlike the original plants. Similarly, Matilda has managed to muddle through a grim existence in a dilapidated, debris-ridden house in a lower middle class neighborhood, learning to deal with her embarrassing mother while managing to avoid becoming anything like her, a future for which her sister seems fated.

== Cast ==
- Joanne Woodward as Beatrice Hunsdorfer
- Nell Potts as Matilda Hunsdorfer
- Roberta Wallach as Ruth Hunsdorfer
- Judith Lowry as Nanny
- David Spielberg as Mr. Goodman
- Richard Venture as Floyd
- Carolyn Coates as Mrs. McKay
- Will Hare as Junk Man
- Estelle Omens as Caroline
- Jess Osuna as Sonny
- Ellen Dano as Janice Vickery
- Lynne Rogers as Miss Hanley
- Roger Serbagi as Charlie
- John Lehne as Apartment Manager
- Michael Kearney as Chris Burns
- Dee Victor as Miss Wyant

== Production ==
Although the story was set on Staten Island, New York, director Newman said that he chose to shoot the film in Bridgeport, Connecticut, because it was only 17 minutes from his home in Westport.

== Critical reception ==
Vincent Canby of The New York Times observed, "The Effect of Gamma Rays is not a stupid film. The talents of everyone connected with it are unmistakable, including those of Mr. Newman, a director of plain, straight style. It's just that the basic material calls for a kind of second-rate bravura performance from everyone, from the production designer to the actors. There's no way to underplay it. At times I had the feeling that Miss Woodward was auditioning for the role of Sadie Thompson, and that Miss Wallach was occasionally in competition. Only Nell Potts (in private life, the daughter of Miss Woodward and Mr. Newman) is allowed to perform at something like a reasonable pace. It's a lovely, solemn performance in a film that otherwise succeeds in being simultaneously too barren and too busy, like Beatrice herself."

Roger Ebert of the Chicago Sun-Times said the film "is hard-edged enough to be less depressing than it sounds" and noted "Joanne Woodward's performance is not like anything she's ever done before . . . It serves notice that she is capable of experimenting with roles that are against type and making them work." He added, "Paul Newman's direction is unobtrusive; he directs as we expect an actor might, looking for the dramatic content of a scene rather than its visual style . . . And the performance by Nell Potts is extraordinary. She glows."

Variety commented, "Newman has gotten it all together here as a director, letting the story and the players unfold with simplicity, restraint and discernment."

Time Out London called the film "an engaging adaptation" of the play "which sees Paul Newman's cool, lucid direction transforming what could have been a pretentious domestic drama into a touching account of small joys in sad and stunted lives ... Potts steals the movie, but what makes it so watchable is Newman's reluctance to sentimentalise."

Review aggregator website Rotten Tomatoes reports that 77% of 13 critics gave the film a positive review, with an average rating of 7.3/10.

== Awards and nominations ==
Joanne Woodward was nominated for the Golden Globe Award for Best Actress – Motion Picture Drama but lost to Liv Ullmann in The Emigrants. She won the Kansas City Film Critics Circle Award for Best Actress and was named Best Actress at the 1973 Cannes Film Festival, where Paul Newman was nominated for the Palme d'Or.

== See also ==
- List of American films of 1972
- Atomic gardening
