= Rachel, Rachel =

1968 film by Paul Newman

- Theatrical release poster
- Directed by: Paul Newman
- Screenplay by: Stewart Stern
- Based on: A Jest of God; 1966 novel by Margaret Laurence
- Produced by: Paul Newman
- Starring: Joanne Woodward; James Olson; Estelle Parsons; Geraldine Fitzgerald
- Cinematography: Gayne Rescher
- Edited by: Dede Allen
- Music by: Jerome Moross
- Production company: Kayos Productions
- Distributed by: Warner Bros.-Seven Arts
- Release date: August 26, 1968
- Running time: 101 minutes
- Country: United States
- Budget: $780,000
- Box office: $3,000,000 (rentals)

Rachel, Rachel is a 1968 American drama film produced and directed by Paul Newman and starring his wife, Joanne Woodward, in the title role and co-starring Estelle Parsons and James Olson. The screenplay, by Stewart Stern based on the 1966 novel A Jest of God by Canadian author Margaret Laurence, concerns a schoolteacher in small-town Connecticut and her sexual awakening and independence in her mid-30s. The film was nominated for four Academy Awards (Best Picture, Best Adapted Screenplay, Best Actress for Woodward, and Best Supporting Actress for Parsons) and won two Golden Globes: Best Director and Best Actress (Drama).

== Plot ==
Rachel Cameron is a shy, 35-year-old, unmarried schoolteacher living with her widowed mother in an apartment above the funeral home once owned by her father in a small town in Connecticut. School is out for summer vacation, and Rachel anticipates a typically boring summer at home with her mother. Fellow unmarried teacher and best friend Calla Mackie persuades Rachel to attend a revival meeting, where a visiting preacher encourages Rachel to express her need for the love of Jesus. Rachel is overwhelmed by the experience, expressing so much suppressed emotion that she is embarrassed. Calla tries to comfort Rachel and suddenly kisses her passionately. Rachel is shocked and runs home and then begins to avoid Calla.

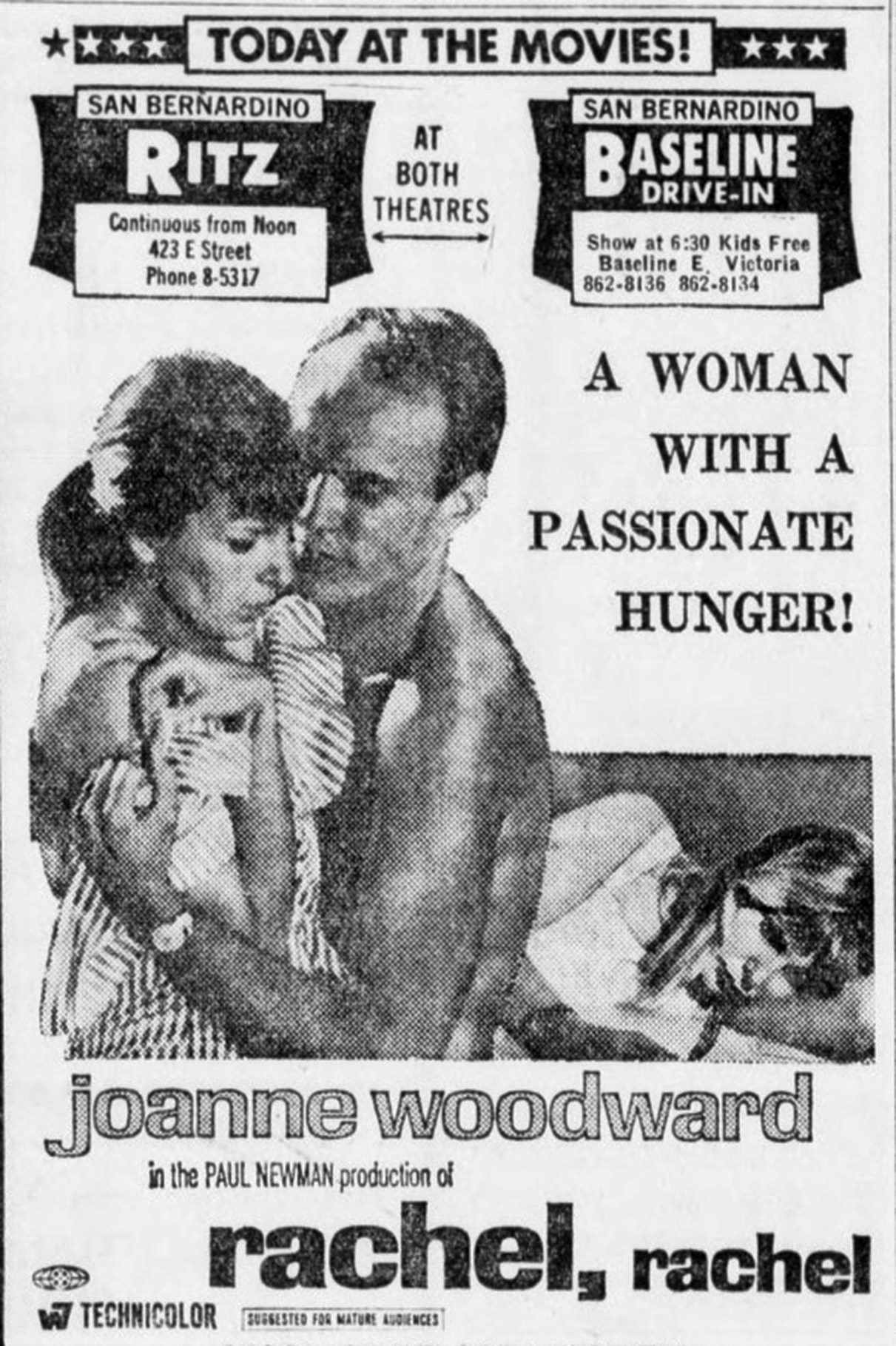
Advertisement from 1968

Nick Kazlik, Rachel's high-school classmate who now teaches at an inner city school in the Bronx, arrives for a short visit. Nick's first appearance in the film happens in a flashback to Rachel's childhood, when he and Rachel talked right after his dead twin brother was carried into Rachel's father's funeral home in a basket.

Upon first seeing the adult Rachel many years later, Nick makes a crude pass that Rachel rebuffs, but after the episode with Calla, she succumbs to his charms and has her first sexual experience. Mistaking lust for love, she begins to plan a future with Nick, who tries to rebuff her gently by showing her a photo of a young boy who looks exactly like him that Rachel thinks is his son. Through a telephone call to Nick's mother, Rachel later discovers that he never married. The child in the photograph who looked exactly like Nick must have been Nick's twin brother, and he must have carried the loss with him into adulthood, perhaps keeping him from having close relationships.

Believing that she is pregnant, Rachel plans to leave town and raise the child. With Calla's assistance, she finds a teaching job in Oregon, but before the summer ends, she learns, to her great disappointment, that she is not pregnant and that her symptoms are the result of a benign cyst. After undergoing surgery to have the cyst removed, Rachel tells her mother that she is moving to Oregon (where her sister lives with her husband and children), and that her mother may accompany her if she wishes. Her mother reluctantly agrees to accompany her. Rachel sets out with hope for the future, having learned that she has choices, that she is able to give and receive sexual pleasure, and that it is possible for her to actively embrace life rather than waiting for it to find her. On the bus ride she fantasizes about walking along the beach holding the hand of a young child.

== Cast ==
- Joanne Woodward as Rachel Cameron
- James Olson as Nick Kazlik
- Kate Harrington as May Cameron
- Estelle Parsons as Calla Mackie
- Donald Moffat as Niall Cameron
- Terry Kiser as Preacher
- Frank Corsaro as Hector Jonas
- Bernard Barrow as Leighton Siddley
- Geraldine Fitzgerald as Reverend Wood

== Production ==
The film marked Paul Newman's directorial debut. It was filmed in August 1967 in various Connecticut locations, including Bethel, Danbury, Georgetown and Redding.

Newman and Woodward's daughter Nell Potts portrays Rachel as a child in flashback scenes.

Additionally their younger daughter Claire appears in the final scene as Rachel's baby boy. Claire was barely two years old during filming, her face isn't seen because she was crying and was afraid of the waves crashing since she couldn't swim.

== Reception ==
In a contemporary review for The New York Times, critic Renata Adler called Rachel, Rachel "the best written, most seriously acted American movie in a long time" and wrote "The direction is mainly sensitive and discreet, but now and then the whole thing goes awash in excess of sentimentality or even ambition. You cannot convey the quality of life in this sort of town, through Rachel's perspective, without losing proportion in melodrama and glop. Petty tragedies, faithfully portrayed, are a little embarrassing...If this were a less ironic age, it might work seriously and completely—like a kind of American cinema Balzac."

Time wrote: "Stewart Stern often gets too close to the novel, adopting where he should adapt. Rachel is shackled with prosy monologues that should have been given visual form. Despite its failings, Rachel, Rachel has several unassailable assets...It is in the transcendent strength of Joanne Woodward that the film achieves a classic stature. There is no gesture too minor for her to master. She peers out at the world with the washed-out eyes of a hunted animal. Her walk is a ladylike retreat, a sign of a losing battle with time and diets and fashion. Her drab voice quavers with a brittle strength that can command a student but break before a parent's will. By any reckoning, it is [her] best performance."

Variety called Rachel, Rachel an "offbeat film" that "moves too slowly" and added "There is very little dialog—most of which is very good—but this asset makes a liability out of the predominantly visual nature of the development, which in time seems to become redundant, padded and tiring...Direction is awkward. Were Woodward not there the film could have been a shambles."

Review aggregator website Rotten Tomatoes reports that 92% of 12 critics gave a positive review of the film, with an average rating of 7.1 out of 10. On Metacritic, the film holds a weighted average score of 74 out of 100 based on nine reviews, indicating "generally favorable reviews".

== Accolades ==
Award	Category	Nominee(s)	Result	Ref.
Academy Awards	Best Picture	Paul Newman	Nominated	
Academy Awards	Best Actress	Joanne Woodward	Nominated	
Academy Awards	Best Supporting Actress	Estelle Parsons	Nominated	
Academy Awards	Best Screenplay – Based on Material from Another Medium	Stewart Stern	Nominated	
British Academy Film Awards	Best Actress in a Leading Role	Joanne Woodward	Nominated	
Directors Guild of America Awards	Outstanding Directorial Achievement in Motion Pictures	Paul Newman	Nominated	
Golden Globe Awards	Best Actress in a Motion Picture – Drama	Joanne Woodward	Won	
Golden Globe Awards	Best Director – Motion Picture	Paul Newman	Won	
Kansas City Film Critics Circle Awards	Best Actress	Joanne Woodward	Won	
Laurel Awards	Top Female Dramatic Performance	Joanne Woodward	Nominated	
Laurel Awards	Top Female Supporting Performance	Estelle Parsons	Won	
National Board of Review Awards	Top Ten Films		5th Place	
National Society of Film Critics Awards	Best Actress	Joanne Woodward	Nominated	
New York Film Critics Circle Awards	Best Director	Paul Newman	Won	
New York Film Critics Circle Awards	Best Actress	Joanne Woodward	Won	
Writers Guild of America Awards	Best Written American Drama	Stewart Stern	Nominated	

== Home media ==
Warner Home Video released the film on Region 1 DVD on February 17, 2009.

== See also ==
- List of American films of 1968
