= Paul Newman =

American actor and filmmaker (1925–2008)

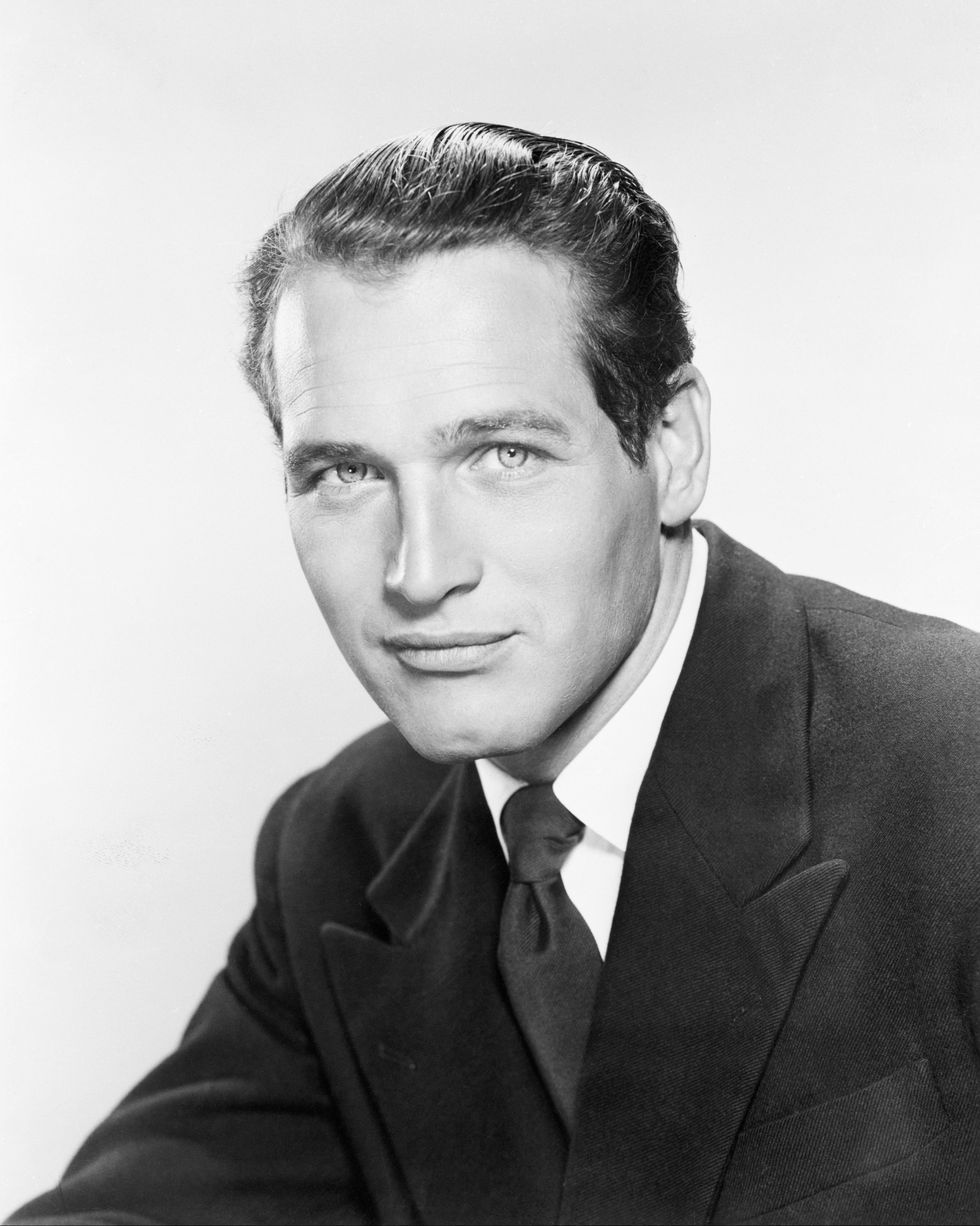
- Newman in 1958
- Born: Paul Leonard Newman; January 26, 1925; Cleveland Heights, Ohio, U.S.
- Died: September 26, 2008 (aged 83); Westport, Connecticut, U.S.
- Resting place: Cremated; ashes scattered near his home
- Education: Kenyon College (BA); Yale School of Drama
- Occupations: Actor; film director; producer; racecar driver; philanthropist; entrepreneur
- Years active: 1949–2008
- Organizations: SeriousFun Children's Network; Safe Water Network
- Works: Full list
- Political party: Democratic
- Spouses: Jackie Witte (m. 1949; div. 1958); Joanne Woodward (m. 1958)
- Children: 6, including Scott, Nell, and Melissa
- Military career
- Allegiance: United States
- Branch: United States Navy
- Service years: 1943–1946
- Rank: Petty Officer Third Class
- Conflicts: World War II; Asiatic-Pacific Theater
- Awards: Navy Good Conduct Medal

Paul Leonard Newman (January 26, 1925 – September 26, 2008) was an American actor, filmmaker, racecar driver, philanthropist, and entrepreneur. He has been described as "one of the last of the great 20th-century movie stars". He was the recipient of numerous awards, including an Academy Award, a BAFTA Award, seven Golden Globe Awards, an Actor Award, a Primetime Emmy Award, a Silver Bear for Best Actor, a Cannes Film Festival Award for Best Actor, and nominations for two Grammy Awards and a Tony Award. Along with his Best Actor Academy Award win, Newman also received the Academy Honorary Award and the Jean Hersholt Humanitarian Award.

Born in Cleveland Heights, Ohio, and raised in Shaker Heights, the eastern suburbs of Cleveland, Newman showed an interest in theater as a child and at age 10 performed in a stage production of Saint George and the Dragon at the Cleveland Play House. He received his Bachelor of Arts degree in drama and economics from Kenyon College in 1949. After touring with several summer stock companies including the Belfry Players, Newman attended the Yale School of Drama for a year before studying at the Actors Studio under Lee Strasberg. His first starring Broadway role was in William Inge's Picnic in 1953 and his final was in Thornton Wilder’s Our Town in 2003.

Newman won the Academy Award for Best Actor for his performance in The Color of Money (1986). His other Oscar-nominated performances were in Cat on a Hot Tin Roof (1958), The Hustler (1961), Hud (1963), Cool Hand Luke (1967), Absence of Malice (1981), The Verdict (1982), Nobody's Fool (1994), and Road to Perdition (2002). He also starred in such films as Somebody Up There Likes Me (1956), The Long, Hot Summer (1958), The Young Philadelphians (1959), Harper (1966), Torn Curtain (1966), Hombre (1967), Butch Cassidy and the Sundance Kid (1969), The Sting (1973), The Towering Inferno (1974), Slap Shot (1977), Fort Apache, The Bronx (1981), and Cars (2006).

Newman won several national championships as a driver in Sports Car Club of America road racing. He co-founded Newman's Own, a food company that donates all post-tax profits and royalties to charity, ushering in a new model for business and philanthropy. As of 2026, these donations totaled over US$600 million. Newman continued to found charitable organizations, such as the SeriousFun Children's Network in 1988 and the Safe Water Network in 2006. Newman was married twice and fathered six children. His second wife was actress Joanne Woodward, with whom he had a screen partnership in directing or acting together throughout their lifetime.

== Early life and family ==
Paul Leonard Newman was born on January 26, 1925, in Cleveland Heights, Ohio, and raised in nearby Shaker Heights. He was the second son of Theresa Garth (née Fetzer, Fetzko, or Fetsko; Slovak: Terézia Fecková; 1894–1982) and Arthur Sigmund Newman Sr. (1893–1950), who ran a sporting goods store.

Newman's father was a son of Simon Newman and Hannah Cohn, Jewish emigrants from Hungary and Poland, respectively. Newman's mother was a practitioner of Christian Science. She was born into a Catholic family in Peticse, then part of the Kingdom of Hungary, Austro-Hungarian Empire, and now part of Slovakia. She worked in her husband's store while raising Newman and another son, Arthur.

Newman showed an early interest in theater; his first role was at the age of seven, playing the court jester in a school production of Robin Hood. At age 10, Newman performed at the Cleveland Play House in a production of Saint George and the Dragon, and acted in their Curtain Pullers children's theater program. Graduating from Shaker Heights High School in 1943, he briefly attended Ohio University in Athens, Ohio, where he was initiated into the Phi Kappa Tau fraternity.

=== Navy service ===
Newman served in the United States Navy in World War II in the Pacific theater. He enrolled in the Navy V-12 pilot training program at Yale University but was dropped when his colorblindness was diagnosed. He later recounted that it was "a bit more complicated" than colorblindness. He also "couldn't do the mathematical things that being a pilot requires". A subsequent test found that he was not colorblind. Boot camp followed, with training as a radioman and tail gunner. He performed poorly in that role, and a friend from the service recounted in Newman's posthumous memoir that his friends lied to Navy trainers so he could pass.

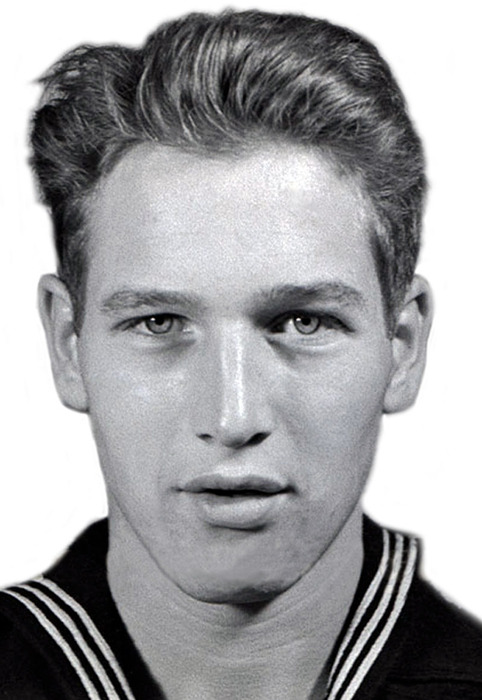
United States Navy photograph of Newman, 1944 or 1945

Qualifying in torpedo bombers in 1944, Aviation Radioman Third Class Newman was sent to Barbers Point, Hawaii. He was assigned to Pacific-based replacement torpedo squadrons VT-98, VT-99, and VT-100, responsible primarily for training replacement combat pilots and aircrewmen, with special emphasis on carrier landings. Newman later flew as a turret gunner in an Avenger torpedo bomber. As a radioman-gunner, his unit was assigned to the aircraft carrier Bunker Hill with other replacements shortly before the Battle of Okinawa in spring 1945. The pilot of his aircraft had an earache and was grounded, as was his crew, including Newman. The rest of their squadron flew to the Bunker Hill. Days later, a kamikaze attack on the vessel killed several hundred crewmen and airmen, including other members of his unit.

In a 2011 interview, screenwriter Stewart Stern recounted that Newman drew on an incident from his Navy years as an "emotional trigger to express the character's trauma" when acting in the 1956 film The Rack. He said that Newman thought back to an incident in which his best friend was sliced to pieces on an aircraft carrier by a plane's propeller.

=== Education ===
After the war, Newman completed a Bachelor of Arts in drama and economics at Kenyon College in Gambier, Ohio, in 1949. Shortly after earning his degree, he joined summer stock companies, including the Belfry Players in Wisconsin and the Woodstock Players in Woodstock, Illinois. He toured with them for three months and developed his talents. He later attended the Yale School of Drama for one year before moving to New York City to study under Lee Strasberg at the Actors Studio. Oscar Levant wrote that Newman initially was hesitant to leave New York for Hollywood and that Newman had said, "Too close to the cake. Also, no place to study." Newman arrived in New York City in 1951 with his first wife Jackie Witte, taking up residence in the St. George section of Staten Island.

== Career ==
=== 1953–1958: Early roles ===
He made his Broadway theatre debut in the original production of William Inge's Picnic with Kim Stanley in 1953. While working on the production, he met Joanne Woodward, an understudy. The two were married in 1958. He also appeared in the original Broadway production of The Desperate Hours in 1955. In 1959, he was in the original Broadway production of Sweet Bird of Youth with Geraldine Page and three years later starred with Page in the film version. During this time Newman started acting in television. His first credited role was in a 1952 episode of Tales of Tomorrow entitled "Ice from Space". In the mid-1950s, he appeared twice on CBS's Appointment with Adventure anthology series.

In February 1954, Newman appeared in a screen test with James Dean, directed by Gjon Mili, for East of Eden (1955). Newman was tested for the role of Aron Trask, Dean for the role of Aron's twin brother Cal. Dean won his part, but Newman lost out to Richard Davalos. That same year, as a last-minute replacement for Dean, he co-starred with Eva Marie Saint and Frank Sinatra in a live color television broadcast of Our Town, which was a musical adaptation of Thornton Wilder's stage play. After Dean's death, Newman replaced Dean in the role of a boxer in a television adaptation of Hemingway's story "The Battler", written by A. E. Hotchner. It was broadcast live on October 18, 1955. That performance led to his breakthrough role as Rocky Graziano in the film Somebody Up There Likes Me in 1956. The Dean connection had additional resonance. Newman was cast as Billy the Kid in The Left Handed Gun, which was a role originally earmarked for Dean. Additionally, Dean was originally cast to play the role of Rocky Graziano in Somebody Up There Likes Me; however, with his death, Newman got the role.

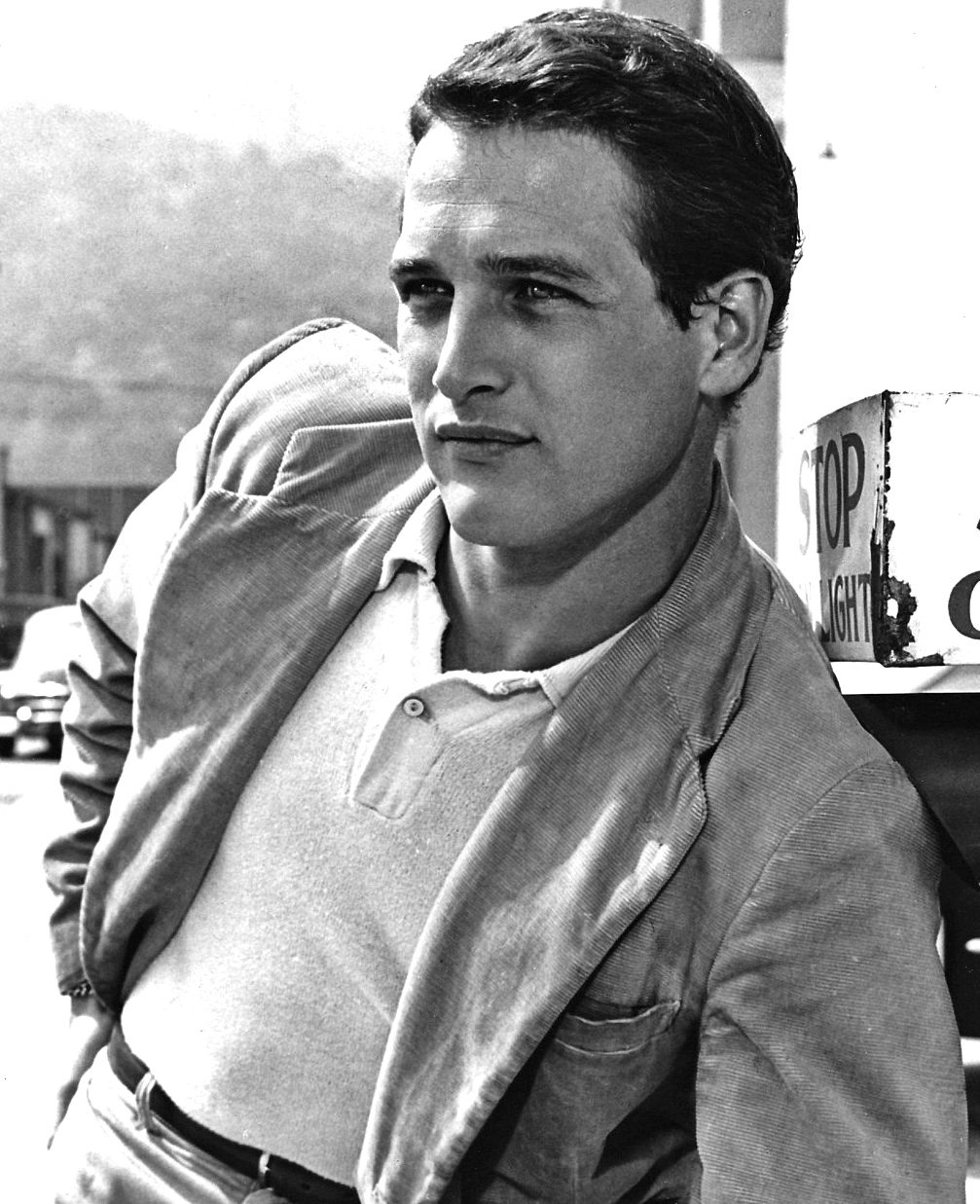
Newman in 1954

Newman's first film for Hollywood was The Silver Chalice (1954), co-starring Italian actress Pier Angeli. The film was a box-office failure, and the actor would later acknowledge his disdain for it. In 1956, Newman garnered much attention and acclaim for the role of Rocky Graziano in Robert Wise's biographical film Somebody Up There Likes Me. That year, he also played the lead in Arnold Laven's The Rack. In 1957, Newman worked again with director Wise in Until They Sail. Also that year, he acted in Michael Curtiz's The Helen Morgan Story.

=== 1958–1979: Career stardom and acclaim ===
In 1958, Newman starred in Cat on a Hot Tin Roof opposite Elizabeth Taylor. The film was a box-office smash, and Newman garnered his first Academy Award nomination. Also in 1958, Newman starred in The Long, Hot Summer with his future wife Joanne Woodward, with whom he reconnected on the set in 1957 (they had first met in 1953). He won Best Actor at the 1958 Cannes Film Festival for this film. He and Woodward had also appeared on screen earlier in 1958 in the Playhouse 90 television play The 80 Yard Run. The couple would go on to make a total of 16 films together.

In 1959, Newman starred in The Young Philadelphians, a film that also featured Barbara Rush, Robert Vaughn and Alexis Smith and was directed by Vincent Sherman. He also co-starred with Woodward in the film Rally Round the Flag, Boys!. In 1960, he starred in Exodus and co-starred with Woodward in From the Terrace.

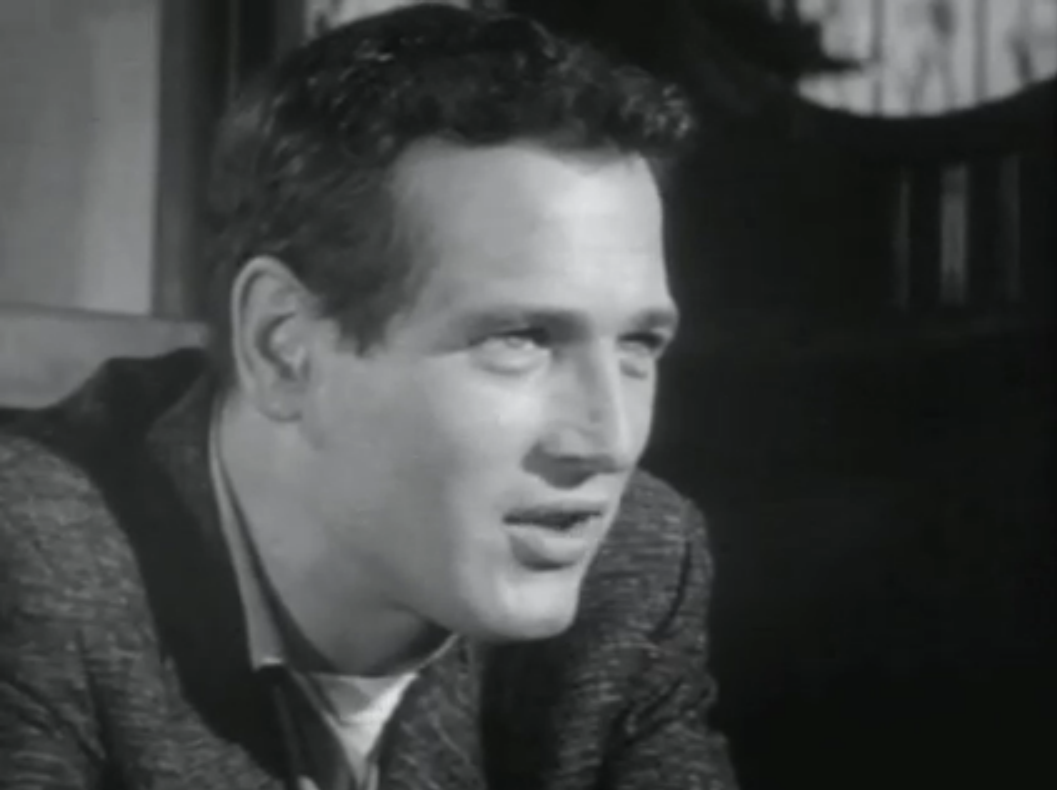
Newman in The Hustler (1961)

In 1961, Newman starred in Robert Rossen's The Hustler. The film, which was based on a book of the same name by Walter Tevis, tells the story of small-time pool hustler "Fast Eddie" Felson (Newman) who challenges a legendary pool player portrayed by Jackie Gleason. The film was a critical and financial hit. Newman won both the British Academy of Film and Television Arts award and the Argentinian Film Festival Best Actor awards. He was also nominated for the same prize at that year's Academy Awards. Stanley Kauffmann, writing for The New Republic, praised the principal cast, calling Newman "first-rate".

Also that year, Newman co-starred with Woodward in Paris Blues. In 1963, Newman starred in Hud and co-starred with Woodward in A New Kind of Love. In 1966, he starred in Torn Curtain and Harper.

In 1967, Newman starred in Martin Ritt's Hombre. The film earned many positive reviews. Also that year, he starred in Stuart Rosenberg's Cool Hand Luke. Newman was again nominated for Best Actor at the Academy Awards. In 2005, the United States Library of Congress selected the film for preservation in the National Film Registry, considering it "culturally, historically or aesthetically significant". Critic Roger Ebert wrote, "Luke is the first Newman character to understand himself well enough to tell us to shove off. He's through risking his neck to make us happy. With this film, Newman completes a cycle of five films over six years, and together they have something to say about the current status of heroism".

In 1968, Newman directed Rachel, Rachel starring Woodward and based on Margaret Laurence's A Jest of God. According to Woodward, Newman did not like the book and had no intention of directing the film. He changed his mind when Woodward could not find any other director. To do the project, the pair accepted a deferred payment. The film was nominated for four Academy Awards including Best Picture and won two Golden Globes including Best Director.

In 1969, Newman co-starred with Woodward in James Goldstone's auto racing film Winning. It was one of the top-grossing film that year in the U.S., reaching the thirteenth position and earning $14,644,335.

Also that year, Newman teamed with fellow actor Robert Redford and director George Roy Hill for Butch Cassidy and the Sundance Kid. Scriptwriter William Goldman talked to Newman about his ideas on approaching the subject matter. Once a script was completed, actor Steve McQueen, who had read it, called Newman suggesting that they star in it together. Newman, assuming he would play the character of Sundance, suggested that they jointly buy the intellectual property, at which point McQueen hesitated. It was eventually bought by producer Paul Monash, and Newman was cast as Butch, which created a title change with Redford as Sundance. Newman explained that for the scene where his character performs bicycle tricks a stuntman had been hired, though the footage had left director Hill unsatisfied; Newman had to perform the tricks. Furthermore, Newman explained that it was his idea with Goldman to develop the musical interlude. The film was a success, grossing over $15 million at the box office, and it was fourth highest-grossing film of the year. At the Academy Awards it was nominated for Best Picture as well as well as receiving nominations in other categories.

Finally that year, along with Barbra Streisand and Sidney Poitier, Newman formed First Artists Production Company so actors could secure properties and develop movie projects for themselves.

In 1970, Newman produced and co-starred with Woodward in Stuart Rosenberg's WUSA, based on Robert Stone's novel A Hall of Mirrors. Newman and his partner John Foreman purchased the rights for $50,000. The film flopped both commercially and critically. However, Newman later said that it is "the most significant film I've ever made and the best".

In 1971, Newman directed and starred in Sometimes a Great Notion based on Ken Kesey's novel. Although several directors were considered, it was announced that Newman would direct. However, Richard A. Colla was signed to direct the film in May 1970. Five weeks after principal photography began, Colla left the project due to "artistic differences over photographic concept", as well as a required throat operation. At the same time, Newman broke his ankle and the production shut down on July 29. As co-executive producer, Newman considered replacing Colla with George Roy Hill, but Hill declined the offer, so when filming resumed two weeks later, Newman was directing.

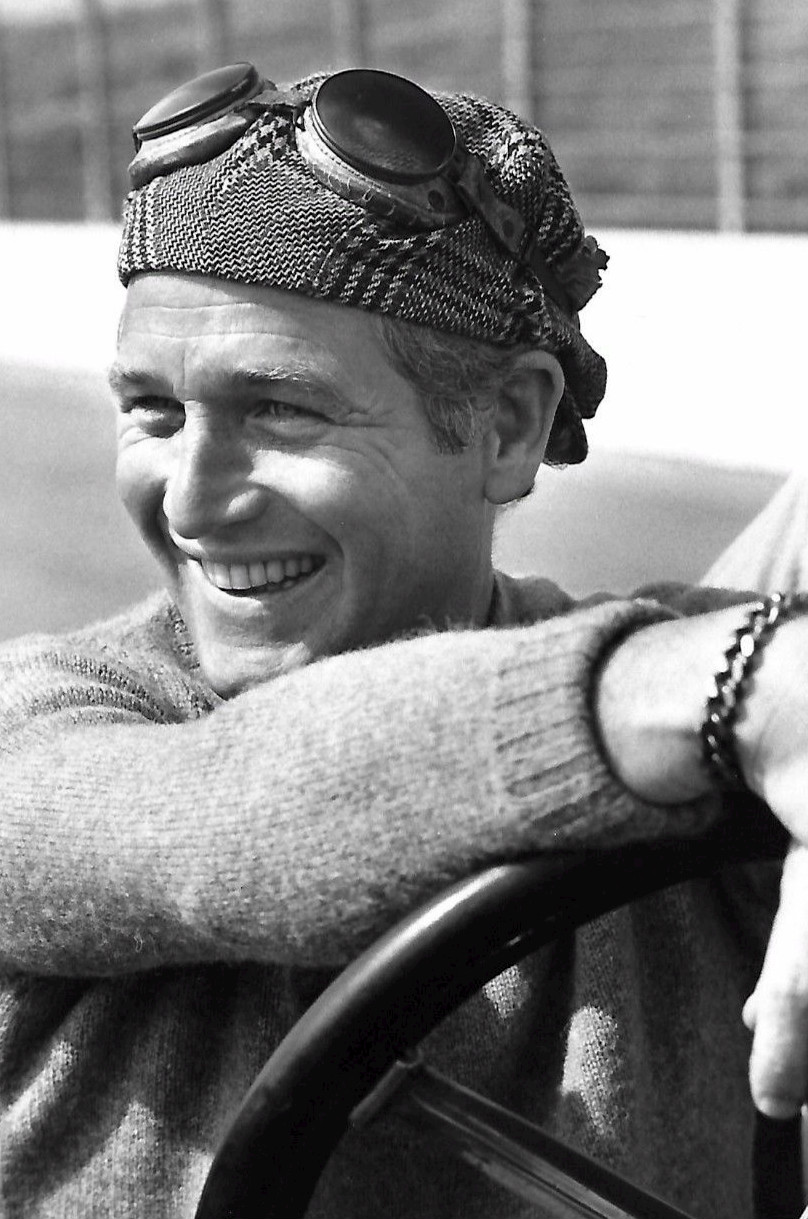
Newman on the set of Once Upon a Wheel (1971)

Also that year, Newman hosted David Winters' made-for-TV documentary Once Upon a Wheel. Winters said that at the time Newman had publicly stated he did not want to do television and turned it down for that reason until Winters explained his own vision to Newman. Newman, a race car enthusiast, said, "The show gives me a chance to get close to a sport I'm crazy about. I love to test a car on my own, to see what I can do, but racing with 25 other guys is a whole different thing. There are so many variables, the skill demanded is tremendous." Bob Bondurant, Newman's driving instructor who appears in the film, explained that Once Upon a Wheel was a passion project for Newman "because he wanted to learn how to drive" and that he had refused projects that would have paid him a much larger salary. The project marked Newman's return to television after a decade long absence, and his first time as the lead of a program. During post-production, Winters said that Newman, who liked what he saw, gave him the idea to add some footage to sell it as a theatrical film worldwide. Upon its release, the documentary generally received good reviews for its directing, pace, photography, music, and human interest stories.

In 1972, Newman's vehicles produced by First Artists included Pocket Money and The Life and Times of Judge Roy Bean. Also that year, Newman directed The Effect of Gamma Rays on Man-in-the-Moon Marigolds, the screen version of the Pulitzer Prize-winning play of the same name. It was in competition at the Cannes Film Festival, and Joanne Woodward won the best actress award.

In 1973, Newman reunited with director George Roy Hill and fellow actor Robert Redford in The Sting. The film made over $68,000,000 in the North American box office and was the highest-grossing film of 1974. For his participation, Newman received top billing, $500,000, and a percentage of the profits. The film was awarded Best Picture at the Academy Awards.

In 1974, Newman co-starred with Steve McQueen in John Guillermin's disaster film The Towering Inferno. Newman plays an architect trapped in a burning skyscraper that he had designed. Newman was paid $1,000,000 plus a percentage of the gross, and he insisted that he do his own stunts. The film was a success and its North American gross was $55,000,000.

In 1975, his third film with First Artists was the Harper sequel The Drowning Pool, in which Woodward appeared.

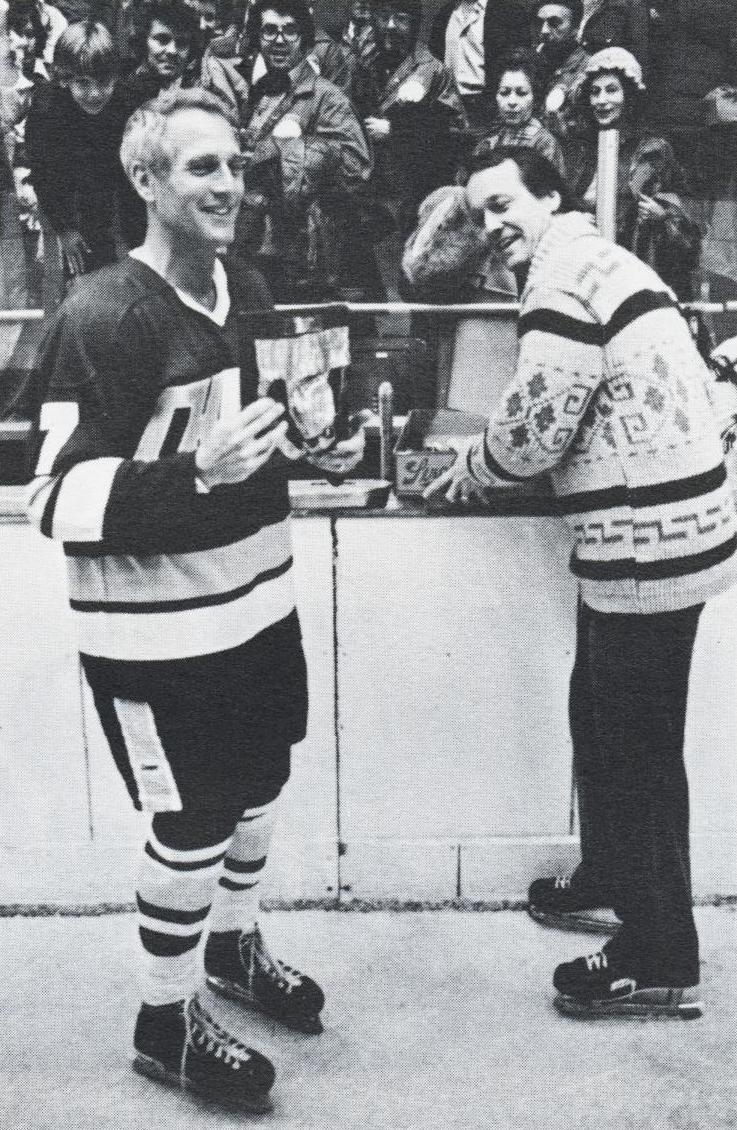
Newman (left) and director George Roy Hill on the set of Slap Shot in 1976

In 1977, Newman reunited with director Hill in the hockey sport comedy Slap Shot. At the time of its release the film received mixed reviews, many saying that it was "setting a new standard in its use of obscenities". Years later on Home Video and cable showings the film gained cult status. That year, Newman opened the Hamptons Hollywood Cafe with his friend Ron Buck.

=== 1980–1999: Late career roles and Oscar win ===
Frank Galvin provides Newman with the occasion for one of his great performances. This is the first movie in which Newman has looked a little old, a little tired. There are moments when his face sags and his eyes seem terribly weary ... [Newman] gives us old, bone-tired, hung-over, trembling (and heroic) Frank Galvin, and we buy it lock, stock and shot glass.

— Roger Ebert (1982)

In 1980, Newman directed the television screen version of the Pulitzer Prize–winning play The Shadow Box. In 1981, he acted in Sydney Pollack's Absence of Malice. He starred in Sidney Lumet's The Verdict in 1982. The film was nominated for Academy Award for Best Picture, and Newman received a nomination for the Academy Award for Best Actor. In 1984, Newman starred in and directed Harry & Son.

In 1986, twenty-five years after The Hustler, Newman reprised his role of "Fast Eddie" Felson in the Martin Scorsese–directed film The Color of Money, for which he finally received the Academy Award for Best Actor. The film was a commercial success although it received mixed reviews. Newman starred with Tom Cruise, Mary Elizabeth Mastrantonio, and John Turturro.

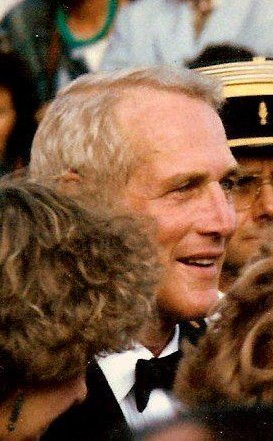
Newman at the 1987 Cannes Film Festival

In mid-1987, Newman sued Universal Pictures for allegedly failing to account properly for revenues from video distribution of four of his films made for Universal and that Universal owed him at least $1 million for the home video versions of The Sting, Slap Shot, Winning, and Sometimes a Great Notion. The complaint claimed that Universal accounted for the cassette revenues in a way that improperly decreased amounts due to Newman, with the actor wanting a full accounting along with $2 million in damages.

Also in 1987, Newman directed a screen version of Tennessee Williams' The Glass Menagerie starring his wife Joanne Woodward, John Malkovich, and Karen Allen. The film was in competition at the Cannes Film Festival. Variety called it "a reverent record" of the Williams play that "one watches with a kind of distant dreaminess rather than an intense emotional involvement" and cited the "brilliant performances ... well defined by Newman's direction".

In 1990, Newman co-starred with Woodward in the James Ivory film adaptation Mr. and Mrs. Bridge based on two Evan S. Connell novels. (An audiobook recording of the books performed by Newman and Woodward was released in 1993.) In 1994, Newman played alongside Tim Robbins as the character Sidney J. Mussburger in the Coen brothers comedy The Hudsucker Proxy, which received mixed reviews. Also that year, he acted in Robert Benton's Nobody's Fool earning yet another nomination for the Academy Award for Best Actor.

=== 2000–2008 ===
In 2003, Newman appeared in a Broadway revival of Wilder's Our Town, winning a nomination for a Tony Award for Best Actor in a Play for his performance. PBS and the cable network Showtime aired a taping of the production, and Newman was nominated for an Emmy Award as well for Outstanding Lead Actor in a Miniseries or TV Movie. Newman's last live-action movie appearance was as a conflicted mob boss in the Sam Mendes-directed film Road to Perdition (2002) opposite Tom Hanks, Jude Law, and Stanley Tucci. For his performance he was nominated for an Academy Award for Best Supporting Actor.

Although he continued to provide voice work for movies, Newman's last live-action appearance was in the 2005 HBO mini-series Empire Falls, based on the Pulitzer Prize-winning novel by Richard Russo, in which he played the dissolute father of the protagonist Miles Roby and for which he won a Golden Globe Award for Best Supporting Actor – Series, Miniseries or Television Film and a Primetime Emmy Award for Outstanding Supporting Actor in a Limited or Anthology Series or Movie.

In keeping with his strong interest in auto racing, Newman provided the voice of Doc Hudson, a retired anthropomorphic race car, in Cars (2006). This was his final role in a major feature film as well as his only animated film role. Almost nine years after his death, he was billed as Doc Hudson in Cars 3 (2017), his appearance made possible through the use of archival recordings. Newman retired from acting in May 2007, saying: "You start to lose your memory, you start to lose your confidence, you start to lose your invention. So I think that's pretty much a closed book for me." He came out of retirement to record narration for the 2007 documentary Dale about the life of NASCAR driver Dale Earnhardt and for the 2008 documentary The Meerkats, his final film role overall. Newman was originally scheduled to direct a production of John Steinbeck's Of Mice and Men at the Westport Country Playhouse in Connecticut in October 2008. However, he withdrew from the production in May 2008 because of health issues, and Mark Lamos was appointed as his replacement. The production was dedicated to Newman's memory.

== Personal life ==
=== Marriages and family ===
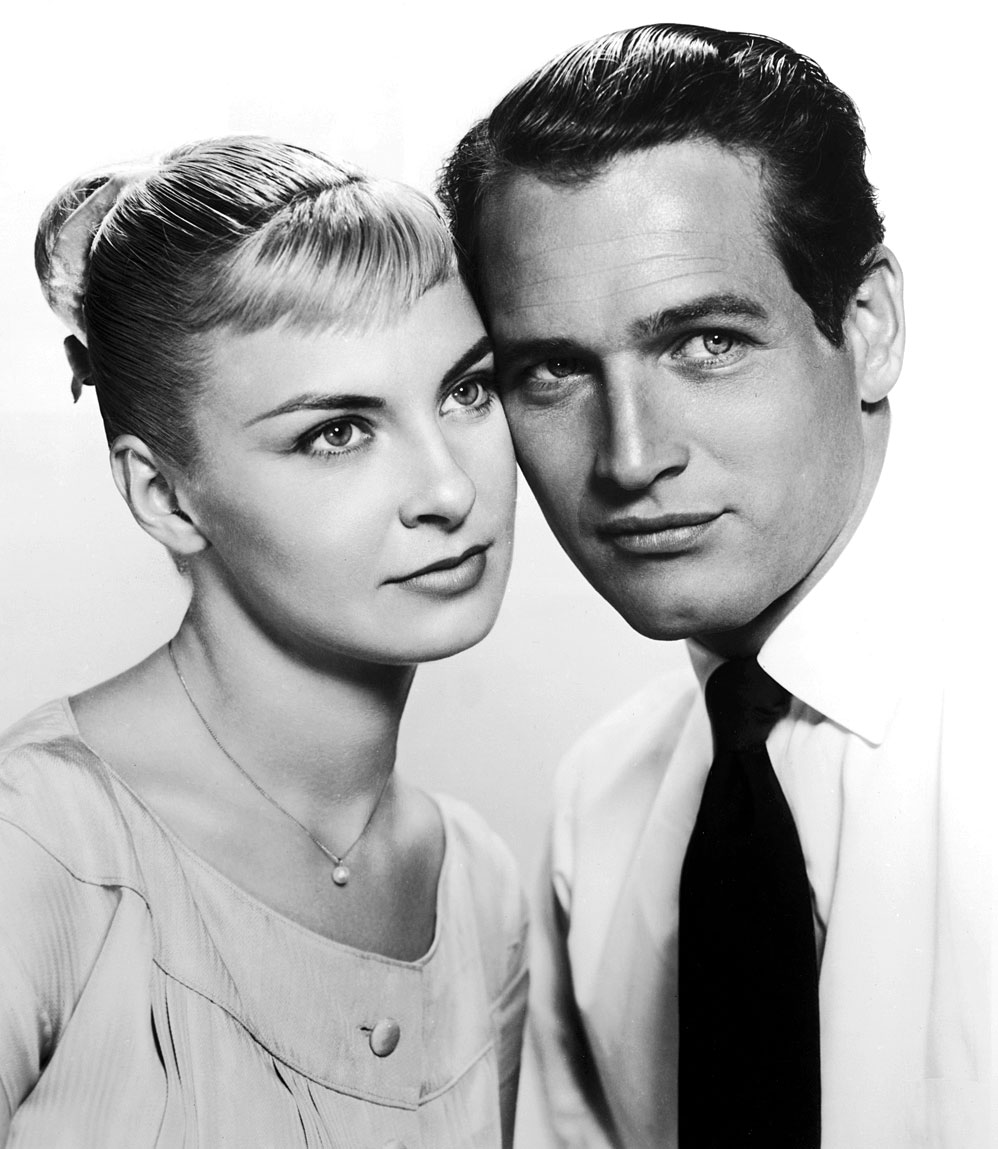
Newman with his second wife, actress Joanne Woodward, in a publicity photograph for the 1958 film The Long, Hot Summer

Newman was married twice. His first marriage was to Jackie Witte from 1949 to 1958. They had a son, Scott (1950–1978) and two daughters, Susan (1953–2025) and Stephanie Kendall (born 1954). Scott, who appeared in films including The Towering Inferno (1974), Breakheart Pass (1975), and Fraternity Row (1977) died in November 1978 from a drug overdose. Newman started the Scott Newman Center for drug abuse prevention in memory of his son. Susan was a documentary filmmaker and philanthropist and had Broadway and screen credits, including a starring role as one of four Beatles fans in I Wanna Hold Your Hand (1978), and also a small role opposite her father in Slap Shot and in A Wedding (1978). She also received a Golden Globe and Humanitas Award, plus Emmy, Peabody and Grammy Awards nominations, for her role as co-producer of Newman's 1980 telefilm The Shadow Box. She died on August 2, 2025 at the age of 72; her death was not made public until October 7, 2025.

Newman met actress Joanne Woodward in 1953, on the production of Picnic on Broadway. It was Newman's debut; Woodward was an understudy. Shortly after filming The Long, Hot Summer in 1957, he divorced Witte to marry Woodward. The Newmans moved to East 11th Street in Manhattan, before buying a home and raising their family in Westport, Connecticut. They were one of the first Hollywood movie star couples to choose to raise their families outside California. They remained married for 50 years until his death in 2008. Woodward has said "He's very good looking and very sexy and all of those things, but all of that goes out the window and what is finally left is, if you can make somebody laugh... And he sure does keep me laughing." Newman has attributed their relationship success to "some combination of lust and respect and patience. And determination."

They had three daughters: Elinor "Nell" Teresa (b. 1959), Melissa "Lissy" Stewart (b. 1961), and Claire "Clea" Olivia (b. 1965). Newman was well known for his devotion to his wife and family. When once asked about fidelity, he said, “I don't like to discuss my marriage, but I will tell you something which may sound corny but which happens to be true. I have steak at home. Why should I go out for hamburger?” He also said that he never met anyone who had as much to lose as he did. In his profile on 60 Minutes, he admitted he once left Woodward after a fight, walked around the outside of the house, knocked on the front door and explained to Joanne he had nowhere to go. Newman directed Nell alongside her mother in the films Rachel, Rachel and The Effect of Gamma Rays on Man-in-the-Moon Marigolds. Newman and Woodward also acted as mentors to Allison Janney. They met her while she was a freshman at Kenyon College during a play Newman was directing.

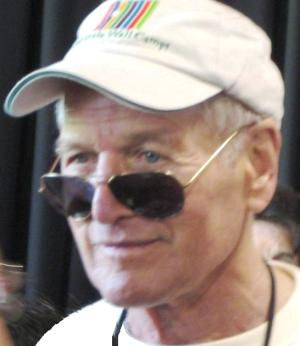
Newman in 2007

In his biography Paul Newman: A Life (2009) film critic Shawn Levy alleged that Newman had had an affair in the late 1960s with divorcée Nancy Bacon, a Hollywood journalist, that lasted one and a half years. In an article in the Irish Independent, which stated also that Levy's claims "caused outrage" and were widely considered "an attempt to sully the image of a revered cinematic legend and committed philanthropist", the affair was reportedly denied by a friend of Newman's wife Joanne, who said she was upset by the claim. Levy criticized the tabloid newspaper the New York Post, which had a long-standing feud with Newman, for focusing on and emphasizing this aspect of his biography.

Newman and Woodward were the subject of a 2022 docuseries by Ethan Hawke, The Last Movie Stars, which was broadcast on HBO Max. The docuseries was based upon tapes compiled by Newman's friend Stewart Stern for a memoir that Newman abandoned but which was eventually published in 2022 as The Extraordinary Life of An Ordinary Man. Laura Linney voiced Woodward and George Clooney voiced Newman.

=== Jewish identity ===
Even though Newman followed the pluralistic Unitarian Universalism movement as an adult, he called himself a Jew, "because it's more of a challenge". When he applied to Kenyon College after the Navy he gave his religion as "Christian Scientist", but apart from that he did not deny that he was Jewish. He recounted in his posthumously published memoirs of having a "strong sense of otherness" as a youth because he was half-Jewish. His heritage "got in the way of my sitting at the 'A' table, which was important to me," but he received no instruction on his Jewish heritage. He only knew that "if you were Jewish, some avenues were shut to you," and that "hurt me and my brother a great deal." Newman deflected the pain with humor, sometimes doing Yiddish voices "for laughs." He was excluded from a high school fraternity because he was Jewish and got into a "bloody fight" in the Navy because a sailor used an anti-Semitic slur. A family friend recounted that the "stigma" of being Jewish was strong in Shaker Heights at the time. "Paul didn't seem Jewish at all, but he paid a price, he had a rough time."

After he began appearing in films, Newman made a point of not changing his name. When he was being considered for the role of Terry Malloy in On the Waterfront, producer Sam Spiegel asked him to "get rid of 'Paul Newman'". Newman's response to Spiegel was, "What do you want me to change it to, 'S.P. Ewman'?"

=== Illness and death ===
Newman was scheduled to make his professional stage directing debut with the Westport Country Playhouse's 2008 production of John Steinbeck's Of Mice and Men, but he stepped down on May 23, 2008, citing his health concerns.

In June 2008, it was widely reported in the press that he had been diagnosed with lung cancer and was receiving treatment for the condition at the Memorial Sloan Kettering Cancer Center in New York City. A.E. Hotchner, who partnered in the 1980s with Newman to start Newman's Own, told the Associated Press in an interview in mid-2008 that Newman had told him about being afflicted with the disease about 18 months earlier. Newman's spokesman told the press that the star was "doing nicely". Newman was a heavy cigarette smoker for most of his life until he quit in 1986.

Newman died at his home in Westport, Connecticut, on the morning of September 26, 2008, at the age of 83 from the illness. He was cremated after a private funeral service.

== Philanthropy ==
With famous writer, A. E. Hotchner, Newman founded Newman's Own, a line of food products intended to give all the profits away, in 1982. The brand started with salad dressing and has expanded to include pasta sauce, lemonade, popcorn, salsa, and pizza, among other things. Newman established a policy that all proceeds, after taxes, would be donated to charity. He co-wrote a memoir about the subject with Hotchner, Shameless Exploitation in Pursuit of the Common Good. Upon his death in 2008, he gifted the food company to Newman’s Own Foundation, which was made possible by the passage of the Philanthropic Enterprise Act of 2017.100% of the profits and royalties from the sale of Newman’s Own products go to the foundation in service of its mission: to nourish and transform the lives of children who face adversity.

Among other awards, Newman's Own co-sponsors the PEN/Newman's Own First Amendment Award, a $25,000 reward designed to recognize those who protect the First Amendment as it applies to the written word.

One beneficiary of his philanthropy is the Hole in the Wall Gang Camp, a residential summer camp for seriously ill children located in Ashford, Connecticut, which Newman co-founded in 1988. It is named after the gang in his film Butch Cassidy and the Sundance Kid (1969), and the real-life, historic Hole-in-the-Wall outlaw hangout in the mountains of northern Wyoming. Newman's college fraternity, Phi Kappa Tau, adopted his Connecticut Hole in the Wall camp as their "national philanthropy" in 1995. In 1988, Newman founded the SeriousFun Children's Network, a global family of summer camps and programs for children with serious illnesses. In 2006, Newman also co-founded Safe Water Network with John Whitehead, former chairman of Goldman Sachs, and Josh Weston, former chairman of ADP, to improve access to safe water to underserved communities around the world.

In 1983, Newman became a major donor for The Mirror Theater Ltd, alongside Dustin Hoffman and Al Pacino, matching a grant from Laurance Rockefeller. Newman was inspired to invest by his connection with Lee Strasberg, as Lee's then daughter-in-law Sabra Jones was the founder and producing artistic director of The Mirror. Paul Newman remained a friend of the company until his death and discussed at numerous times possible productions in which he could star with his wife, Joanne Woodward. In June 1999, Newman donated $250,000 to Catholic Relief Services to aid refugees in Kosovo.

On June 1, 2007, Kenyon College announced that Newman had donated $10 million to the school to establish a scholarship fund as part of the college's $230 million fund-raising campaign. Newman and Woodward were honorary co-chairs of a previous campaign.

Newman was one of the founders of the Committee Encouraging Corporate Philanthropy (CECP).. Newman and Malkin met with David Rockefeller, then Chairman of Chase Manhattan Bank; Paul Volcker, former Chairman of the Federal Reserve Bank; and John Whitehead, then Co-Chairman of Goldman Sachs; and enlisted each of them to serve as an Honorary Co-Chair of the committee, now known as Chief Executives for Corporate Purpose. https://cecp.co/cecp-insights-blog/back-to-where-it-all-began/ Newman was named the Most Generous Celebrity of 2008 by Givingback.org. He contributed $20,857,000 for the year of 2008 to the Newman's Own Foundation, which distributes funds to a variety of charities.

Upon Newman's death, the Italian newspaper (a "semi-official" paper of the Holy See) L'Osservatore Romano published a notice lauding Newman's philanthropy. It also commented that "Newman was a generous heart, an actor of a dignity and style rare in Hollywood quarters."

Newman was responsible for preserving lands around Westport, Connecticut. He lobbied the state's governor for funds for the 2011 Aspetuck Land Trust in Easton. In 2011, Paul Newman's estate gifted land to Westport to be managed by the Aspetuck Land Trust.

== Political activism ==
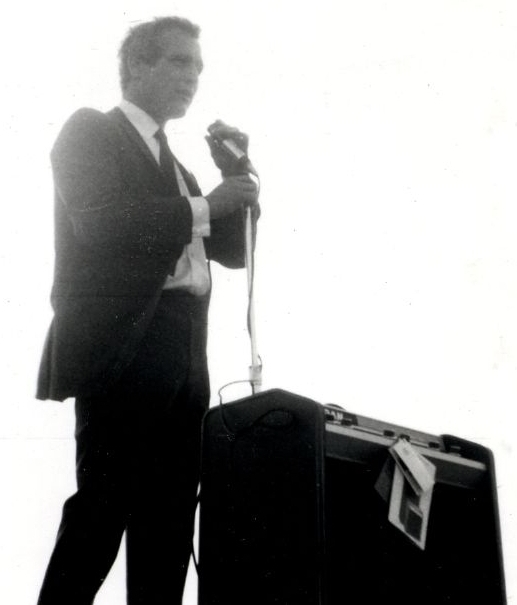
Newman at a political rally for Eugene McCarthy in 1968

Newman was a supporter of Eugene McCarthy's unsuccessful 1968 campaign for the Democratic Party's presidential nomination. At the 1968 Democratic National Convention, Newman was a McCarthy-pledged delegate from Connecticut. While Newman was a lifelong Democrat, he endorsed and voted for Independent candidate John B. Anderson in 1980, who was a liberal Republican, instead of the incumbent Democratic president, Jimmy Carter. For Newman's support of McCarthy's 1968 campaign, effective use of television commercials in California, and his opposition to the Vietnam War, Newman was placed nineteenth on Richard Nixon's enemies list, which Newman claimed was his greatest accomplishment. In 1960 he endorsed Gore Vidal's congressional run and in 1964, he and his wife, Joanne Woodward, supported Lyndon B. Johnson for president. During the 1968 presidential election, Newman supported Democratic nominee Hubert Humphrey and appeared in a pre-election night telethon for him.

Newman attended the March on Washington on August 28, 1963, and was also present at the first Earth Day event in Manhattan on April 22, 1970. Newman was concerned about global warming and supported nuclear energy development as a solution. He was also described as a "vocal supporter" of gay rights and same-sex marriage.

Newman was linked to the "Malibu Mafia" to promote progressive issues in politics. This was a group of wealthy men in the Greater Los Angeles area who met to discuss politics. Backed by them, Newman and his wife went to Washington in 1976 to speak in favor of breaking up Big Oil into separate components. Newman supported their 1980s effort to establish a bilateral Nuclear Freeze to stop the proliferation of nuclear weapons in the United States and the Soviet Union. He said he would stand up for Walter Mondale in the 1984 presidential election as long as there was cold Budweiser and Nuclear Freeze involved.

In January 1995, Newman was the chief investor of a group, including the writer E. L. Doctorow and the editor Victor Navasky, that bought the progressive periodical The Nation. Newman was an occasional writer for the publication. He endorsed Green Party candidate Ralph Nader in the 2000 presidential election. He endorsed Howard Dean's presidential campaign in 2004.

Consistent with his work for liberal causes, Newman publicly supported Ned Lamont's candidacy in the 2006 Connecticut Democratic Primary against Senator Joe Lieberman, and was even rumored as a candidate himself, until Lamont emerged as a credible alternative. He donated to Chris Dodd's presidential campaign. Newman earlier donated money to Bill Richardson's campaign for president in 2008.

== Auto racing ==
24 Hours of Le Mans career
- Years: 1979
- Teams: Dick Barbour Racing
- Best finish: 2nd (1979)
- Class wins: 1 (1979)

Newman was an auto racing enthusiast and first became interested in motorsports ("the first thing that I ever found I had any grace in") while training at the Watkins Glen Racing School for the filming of Winning, a 1969 film. According to his instructor Bob Bondurant, it was because of his love and passion for racing, Newman agreed in 1971 to star in and to host television special Once Upon a Wheel, on the history of auto racing. Newman's first professional event as a racer was in 1972 at Thompson International Speedway, quietly entered as "P. L. Newman", by which he continued to be known in the racing community.

Newman was a frequent competitor in Sports Car Club of America (SCCA) events for the rest of the decade, eventually winning four national championships. He later drove in the 1979 24 Hours of Le Mans in Dick Barbour's Porsche 935, finishing in second place. Newman reunited with Barbour in 2000 to compete in the Petit Le Mans.

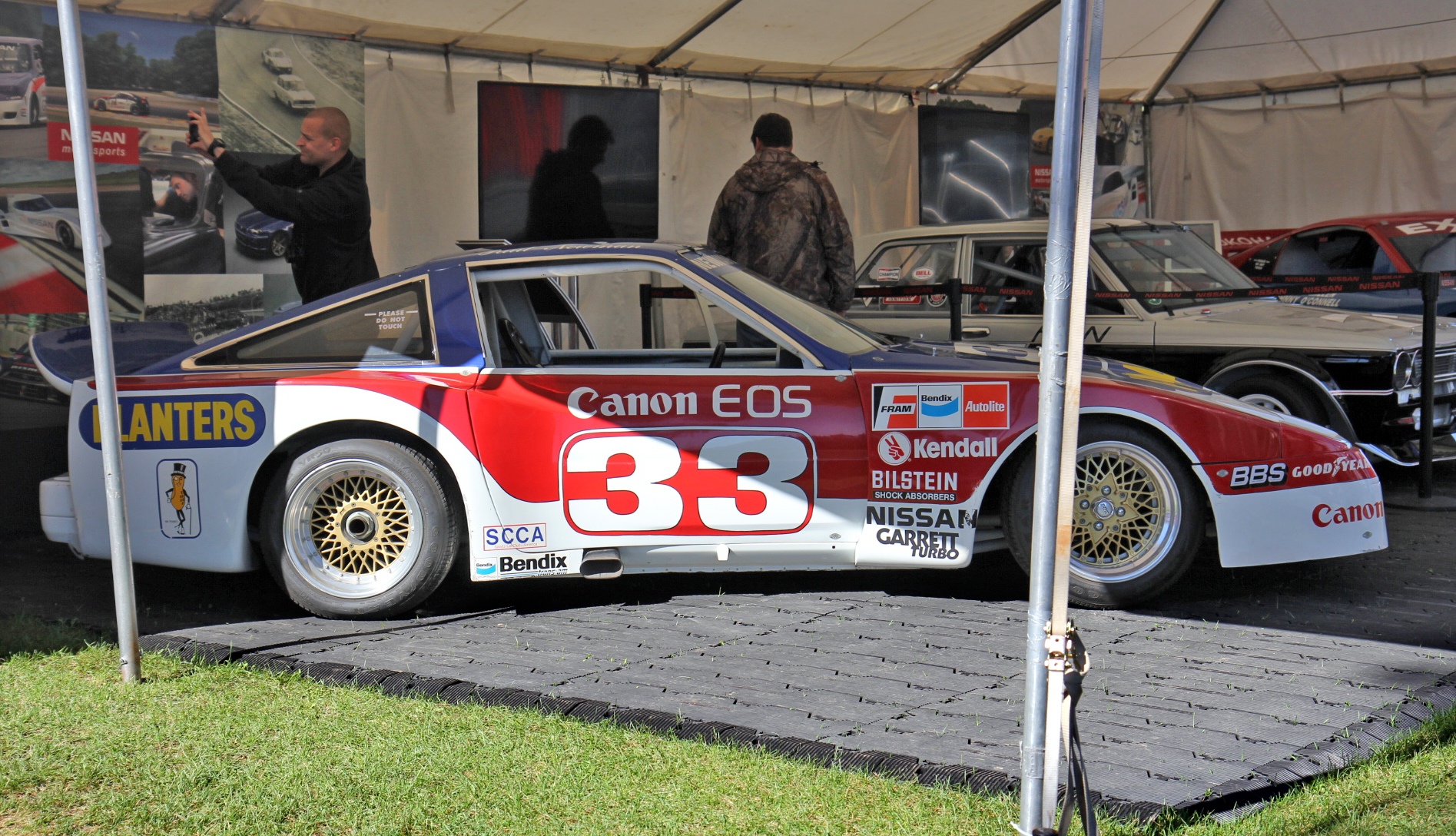
Sharp/Newman Nissan

From the mid-1970s to the early 1990s, he drove for the Bob Sharp Racing team, racing mainly Datsuns (later rebranded as Nissans) in the Trans-Am Series. He became closely associated with the brand during the 1980s, even appearing in commercials for the brand in Japan and having a special edition of the Nissan Skyline named after him. At the age of 70 years and eight days, Newman became the oldest driver to date to be part of a winning team in a major sanctioned race, winning in his class at the 1995 24 Hours of Daytona. Among his last major races were the Baja 1000 in 2004 and the 24 Hours of Daytona once again in 2005.

During the 1976 auto racing season, Newman became interested in forming a professional auto racing team and contacted Bill Freeman, who introduced Newman to professional auto racing management, and their company specialized in Can-Am, Indy Cars, and other high-performance racing automobiles. The team was based in Santa Barbara, California, and commuted to Willow Springs International Motorsports Park for many of its testing sessions.

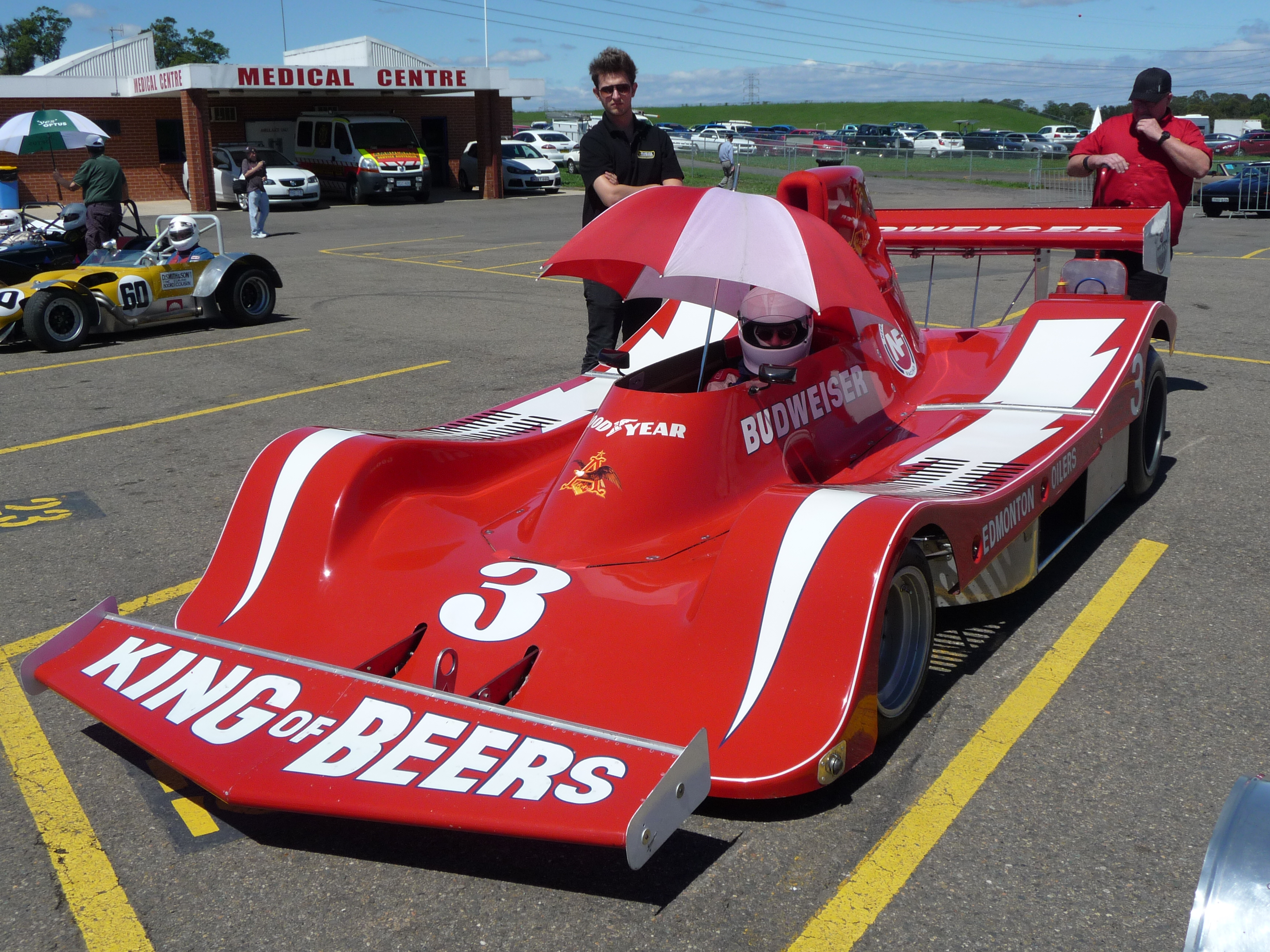
A Newman Freeman Racing Spyder NF Can-Am race car from 1979)

Their Newman Freeman Racing team was very competitive in the North American Can-Am series in its Budweiser-sponsored, Chevrolet-powered Spyder NFs. Newman and Freeman began a long and successful partnership with the Newman Freeman Racing team in the Can-Am series, which culminated in the Can-Am Team Championship trophy in 1979. Newman was associated with Freeman's established Porsche racing team, which enabled both Newman and Freeman to compete in SCCA and IMSA racing events together, including the Sebring 12-hour endurance sports car race. This car was sponsored by Beverly Porsche/Audi. Freeman was Sports Car Club of America's Southern Pacific National Champion during the Newman Freeman period. Later, Newman co-founded Newman/Haas Racing with Carl Haas, a Champ Car team, in 1983, going on to win eight drivers' championships under his ownership.

Newman was briefly an owner in the NASCAR Winston Cup Series when he co-founded a research and development #18 team with Hendrick Motorsports' Greg Sacks behind the wheel; the team shut down after two seasons after losing its primary sponsor. Newman was briefly entered in the 1987 The Budweiser at The Glen in the No. 51 for Hendrick in the NASCAR Winston Cup Series but later withdrew. His 1996 racing season was chronicled in the IMAX film Super Speedway (1997), which Newman narrated. He was a partner in the Atlantic Championship team Newman Wachs Racing. Newman voiced Doc Hudson in Cars (2006).

Having said he would quit "when I embarrass myself", Newman competed into his 80s, winning at Lime Rock in what former co-driver Sam Posey called a "brutish Corvette", which displayed his age as its number: 81. He took the pole in his last professional race, in 2007 at Watkins Glen International, and in a 2008 run at Lime Rock, arranged by friends, he reportedly still did 9/10 of his best time. Newman was posthumously inducted into the SCCA Hall of Fame at the national convention in Las Vegas, Nevada, on February 21, 2009. Lime Rock Park's No Name Straight was renamed Paul Newman Straight in 2022. Newman's racing life was chronicled in the documentary Winning: The Racing Life of Paul Newman (2015).

Motorsports career results

SCCA National Championship Runoffs

Year	Track	Car	Class	Finish	Start	Status
1973	Road Atlanta	Nissan 510	B Sedan	9	15	Running
1975	Road Atlanta	Nissan 510	B Sedan	6	11	Running
1976	Road Atlanta	Nissan 510	B Sedan	3	6	Running
1976	Road Atlanta	Triumph TR6	D Production	1	1	Running
1978	Road Atlanta	Nissan 280Z	C Production	2	3	Running
1978	Road Atlanta	Nissan 200SX	B Sedan	3	4	Running
1979	Road Atlanta	Nissan 280ZX	C Production	1	2	Running
1979	Road Atlanta	Nissan 200SX	B Sedan	3	3	Running
1980	Road Atlanta	Nissan 280ZX	C Production	2	6	Running
1982	Road Atlanta	Nissan 280ZX Turbo	GT1	2	23	Running
1983	Road Atlanta	Nissan 280ZX	GT1	21	1	Running
1985	Road Atlanta	Nissan 280ZX Turbo	GT1	1	1	Running
1986	Road Atlanta	Nissan 280ZX Turbo	GT1	1	1	Running
2002	Mid Ohio	Jaguar	GT1	9	11	Running

Complete 24 Hours of Le Mans results (key)

Year	Team	Co-Drivers	Car	Class	Laps	Pos.	Class Pos.
1979	(Germany) Dick Barbour Racing	(Germany) Rolf Stommelen (United States) Dick Barbour	Porsche 935	IMSA+2.5	300	2nd	1st

=== NASCAR ===
(key) (Bold – Pole position awarded by qualifying time. Italics – Pole position earned by points standings or practice time. * – Most laps led.)

==== Winston Cup Series ====
NASCAR Winston Cup Series results
Year	Team	No.	Make	1	2	3	4	5	6	7	8	9	10	11	12	13	14	15	16	17	18	19	20	21	22	23	24	25	26	27	28	29	NWCC	Pts	Ref
1987	Hendrick Motorsports	51	Chevy	DAY	CAR	RCH	ATL	DAR	NWS	BRI	MAR	TAL	CLT	DOV	POC	RIV	MCH	DAY	POC	TAL	GLN; Wth	MCH	BRI	DAR	RCH	DOV	MAR	NWS	CLT	CAR	RIV	ATL	N/A	0	

== Acting credits ==
Selected film credits:

- Somebody Up There Likes Me (1956)
- The Long, Hot Summer (1958)
- Cat on a Hot Tin Roof (1958)
- The Hustler (1961)
- Sweet Bird of Youth (1962)
- Hud (1963)
- Torn Curtain (1966)
- Hombre (1967)
- Cool Hand Luke (1967)
- Butch Cassidy and the Sundance Kid (1969)
- The Sting (1973)
- The Towering Inferno (1974)
- Slap Shot (1977)
- Fort Apache, The Bronx (1981)
- Absence of Malice (1981)
- The Verdict (1982)
- The Color of Money (1986)
- Mr. and Mrs. Bridge (1990)
- The Hudsucker Proxy (1994)
- Nobody's Fool (1994)
- Road to Perdition (2002)
- Cars (2006)

== Awards and honors ==
Newman was nominated for an Academy Award in five different decades. In addition to awards Newman won for specific roles, he received an honorary Academy Award in 1986 for his "many and memorable and compelling screen performances" and the Jean Hersholt Humanitarian Award for his charity work in 1994.

In 1992, Newman and his wife, Joanne Woodward, were recipients of Kennedy Center Honors. In 1994, the couple received the Award for Greatest Public Service Benefiting the Disadvantaged, an award given annually by Jefferson Awards. Newman won Best Actor at the Cannes Film Festival for The Long, Hot Summer and the Silver Bear at the Berlin International Film Festival for Nobody's Fool.

In 1968, Newman was named Man of the Year by Harvard University's performance group, the Hasty Pudding Theatricals. The 2008 edition of Sport Movies & TV – Milano International FICTS Fest was dedicated to his memory. In 2015, the U.S. Postal Service issued a 'forever stamp' commemorating Newman, which went on sale on September 18, 2015. It features a 1980 photograph of Newman by photographer Steve Schapiro, accompanied by text that reads: 'Actor/Philanthropist'.

Since the 1970s, Newman Day is an event celebrated at Bates College, Kenyon College, Princeton University, and some other American colleges. On Newman Day, students try to drink 24 beers in 24 hours, based on a quote attributed to Newman about there being 24 beers in a case, and 24 hours in a day, and that this is surely not a mere coincidence. In 2004, Newman requested that Princeton University dissociate the event from his name, due to the fact that he did not endorse the behavior. He cited his creation in 1980 of the Scott Newman Center, "dedicated to the prevention of substance abuse through education". Princeton disavowed any responsibility for the event, responding that Newman Day is not sponsored, endorsed, or encouraged by the university itself and is solely an unofficial event among students.

On October 26, 2017, Paul Newman's Rolex Daytona wristwatch was auctioned in New York by Phillips Auctions for $17.5 million, making it one of the most expensive wristwatches ever sold at an auction. On September 3, 2022, Lime Rock Park, a road course in Lakeville, Connecticut, named the straight of the circuit past the Esses before The Uphill the Paul Newman Straight during the Historic Festival 40.

Newman was inducted into the Motorsports Hall of Fame of America in 2024.

== Bibliography ==
- Newman, Paul; Hotchner, A. E. Newman's Own Cookbook. Simon & Schuster, 1998; ISBN 0-684-84832-5.
- Newman, Paul; Hotchner, A. E. Shameless Exploitation in Pursuit of the Common Good. Doubleday Publishing, 2003; ISBN 0-385-50802-6.

== See also ==
- List of actors with Academy Award nominations
- List of actors with more than one Academy Award nomination in the acting categories
- List of oldest and youngest Academy Award winners and nominees — Oldest winners for Best Lead Actor
- List of Jewish Academy Award winners and nominees
- List of Golden Globe winners
- List of Primetime Emmy Award winners
- List of peace activists
- List of select Jewish racing drivers

== Works cited ==
- Levy, Shawn (2009). Paul Newman: A Life. Harmony Books. ISBN 978-0-307-35375-7.
- Morella, Joe; Epstein, Edward Z. (1988). Paul and Joanne: A Biography of Paul Newman and Joanne Woodward. Delacorte Press. ISBN 0-440-50004-4. OCLC 18016049.
- Newman, Paul (2022). Rosenthal, David (ed.). The Extraordinary Life of an Ordinary Man: A Memoir (First ed.). New York: Knopf. ISBN 978-0-593-53450-2.
- Winters, David (2018). Tough Guys Do Dance. Pensacola, Florida: Indigo River Publishing. ISBN 978-1-948080-27-9.

Media offices
Preceded by	President of the Actors Studio; 1982–1994	Succeeded by Al Pacino; Ellen Burstyn; Harvey Keitel
