= Newman's Own =

American food company named after Paul Newman

- Type: Private
- Founded: 1982; 44 years ago
- Founders: Paul Newman; A.E. Hotchner
- Headquarters: Westport, Connecticut, US
- Key people: Alex Amouyel (President and CEO)
- Products: Various food and pet food products
- Website: newmansown.com

Newman's Own is an American food company headquartered in Westport, Connecticut. It is best known for its salad dressing, frozen pizza, cookies, lemonade, and dog treats. Founded in 1982 by actor Paul Newman and author A.E. Hotchner, the company donates all of its after-tax profits to charity through Newman's Own Foundation, a private nonprofit foundation that supports child-focused programs.

== History ==
The brand started in 1982 with a homemade salad dressing that Paul Newman and A.E. Hotchner prepared themselves and gave to friends as gifts. The successful reception of the salad dressing led Newman and Hotchner to commercialize it for sale, financing it with $20,000 each as seed money. Afterward, they also produced spaghetti sauce, lemonade, popcorn, frozen pizza, salsa, and several other products; Newman's Own premium wines product line was launched in 2008. The company incorporated humor into its label packaging, as in the label for its first salad dressing in 1982, "Fine Foods Since February".

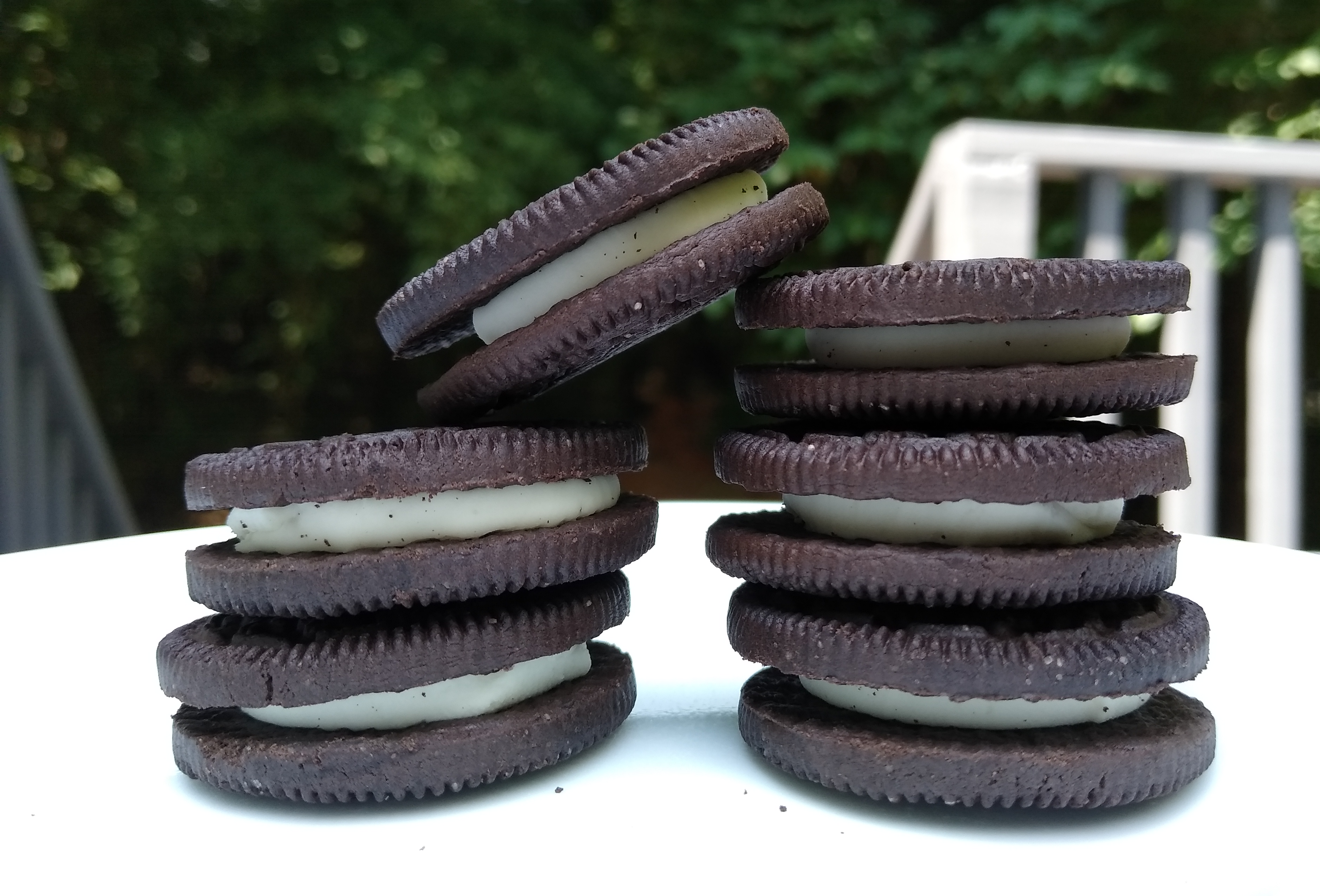
Newman-O's cookies made by Newman's Own

In 1993, Newman's daughter Nell Newman founded Newman's Own Organics as a division of the company, later to become a separate company in late 2001. It produced organic foods, including chocolate, cookies, pretzels and pet food. Her father posed with her for the photographs on the labels. In 2014, Nell's license with Newman's Own was not renewed, and Newman's Own Organics was transferred back to Newman's Own.

Newman and Hotchner co-wrote Shameless Exploitation in Pursuit of the Common Good (ISBN 0-385-50802-6), a memoir about their company and the Hole in the Wall Gang Camps, published in 2003. Newman and CEO Robert Forrester arranged for the continuation of the distribution of Newman's Own profits to charity after Newman's death through the establishment of the Newman's Own Foundation. Following Newman's death in 2008, control of the company and foundation passed to CEO Robert Forrester. After taking over, Forrester expanded and diversified the company. Newman's daughter, Susan, has alleged that Forrester had taken her family "hostage" and pushed them off the board of the Newman's Own Foundation, the body set up to distribute company profits to charitable causes. Forrester said that the company and foundation are continuing to be operated in accordance with the late Paul Newman's expressed wishes. His salary increased from $185,000 to $295,000 from 2010 to 2013. Forrester was fired in 2019 as a result of an internal review following allegations of inappropriate behavior, and the board appointed Jennifer Smith Turner as interim president and CEO. In January 2020, Dr. Miriam Nelson took over those roles, and the board finalized the positions in January 2021. As of April 2023, the current President and CEO of Newman's Own Foundation is Alex Amouyel.

== Business model ==
100% of profits and royalties from the sale of Newman's Own foods are donated to charity. When Paul Newman died in 2008, he gifted the food company to Newman's Own Foundation, which was made possible by the passage of the Philanthropic Enterprise Act of 2017.

In January 2025, Newman's Own launched a campaign encouraging more companies to adopt its model.

Newman's Own has inspired other philanthropic enterprises, including Hugh Jackman's Laughing Man Coffee.

== Charitable funding and beneficiaries ==
Newman's Own Foundation is a 501(c)(3) Private Nonoperating Foundation, as verified by Candid (EIN 06-1606588). According to the Newman's Own Foundation website, over $600 million has been generated for charity since 1982. In 2016, the company donated profits of $30 million after gross sales of $600 million.

Grantee are listed on the Newman's Own Foundation website along with a description of funding areas. One beneficiary is the SeriousFun Children's Network (previously the Association of Hole in the Wall Camps), summer camps and programs for seriously ill children, which Newman co-founded in 1988. Today, there are camps, programs, and initiatives operating across five continents. Over 2.4 million camp experiences have been provided to children and families free of charge. While proceeds from Newman's Own helped finance the startup of the first camp, the network and its member camps now receive funding from many sources.

Newman's Own Foundation's priority areas also include Nutrition Education & School Food and Indigenous Food Justice. Newman’s Own Foundation has invested resources in Native American communities since the 1990s. In 2025, the Foundation granted $12.4 million to nonprofits and Tribes across the United States and territories.

Historically, the Foundation has funded The New York Times Neediest Cases Fund (from 1983 onwards), Shining Hope for Communities, Safe Water Network, Edible Schoolyard NYC, the WILD Young Women Programme (New Zealand), and Pilgrims Hospices (UK). The company co-sponsored the PEN/Newman's Own First Amendment Award, which was presented annually to a United States resident who had fought courageously, despite adversity, to safeguard the First Amendment right to freedom of expression as it applied to the written word. Newman's Own has also contributed to the advancement of the study and teaching of philanthropy at institutions like Marist University, where Raymond A. Lamontagne was designated the first Paul Newman Senior Fellow in Philanthropy.

In March 2023, Newman's Own Foundation announced the Food Justice for Kids Prize, $1 million in funding over two years. Two inaugural beneficiaries in DC included FRESHFARM's FoodPrints program and Urban School Food Alliance. The second Food Justice For Kids Prize, launched in March 2026, grew to $1.4 million with additional funding from Australian not-for-profit ticketing company Humanitix, The Henry P. Kendall Foundation, and the Hunger to Health Collaboratory.

In June 2025, Newman's Own Foundation launched a participatory grantmaking program called The Indigenous Tomorrows Fund, led by Native Americans in Philanthropy. In the pilot year, the program granted $720,000, with 21 emerging Indigenous leaders making grant decisions.

== See also ==
- Hamptons Hollywood Cafe, a defunct hamburger restaurant owned by Paul Newman
