= The Man Who Lived at the Ritz =

1982 novel by A. E. Hotchner

- Author: A. E. Hotchner
- Language: English
- Genre: Historical fiction Thriller
- Publisher: Putnam
- Publication date: January 1982
- Publication place: United States
- Media type: Print (hardcover)
- Pages: 286
- ISBN: 978-0-39912-651-2

The Man Who Lived at the Ritz is a 1982 novel by A. E. Hotchner. It is the story of American painter Philip Weber, who lives at the Hôtel Ritz Paris during the German Occupation, and his friendships with notables such as Hermann Göring and Coco Chanel. The novel was adapted into a 1988 television miniseries starring Perry King.

== Reception ==
Anatole Broyard wrote for The New York Times, "Toward the end ... the book turns into a thriller as well as a legitimate novel and a quasi-documentary portrait of Paris. Yet there's something about the author's style, a savoir vivre learned in Paris, perhaps, which makes these various modes cohere." People noted that "the ending ... is melodramatic, but the yarn is as easy to read as it will be to sit through the inevitable movie version".

== Miniseries adaptation ==
The Man Who Lived at the Ritz was adapted into a four-hour 1988 television miniseries starring Perry King as Philip. Directed by Desmond Davis with a teleplay by Gordon Cotler, it costarred Joss Ackland as Hermann Göring and Leslie Caron as Coco Chanel. Other cast members included Cherie Lunghi as Lili Gloebocka, David McCallum as Charlie Ritz, Patachou as Madame Ritz, Sophie Barjac as Martine Fauvet, Brigitte Kahn as Ilse Falk, David Robb as De Forrestiere, Richard Durden as Man Ray, and Marc Duret as Pierre Monet. The miniseries aired in two parts in the US in syndication on varying dates in November and December 1988.
