= Safe Water Network =

US-based non-profit organization

- Founded: 2006; 20 years ago
- Type: International Development, NGO
- Location: New York City, United States
- Region served: Ghana, India
- CEO: Chris Williams
- Website: safewaternetwork.org

Safe Water Network is a non-profit organization founded in 2006 by actor and philanthropist Paul Newman, along with other civic and business leaders.

== Purpose ==
The organization was founded to help address the evidence gap in off-grid water systems. Safe Water Network works with the private and public sectors to overcome obstacles to local sustainability and scale in providing clean and safe drinking water. It oversees field initiatives to develop and refine models for providing safe water that can be taken to scale.

== Network members ==
The network empowers communities by working with national, regional, and local government authorities in India and Ghana, as well as partnering with NGOs and private sector foundations and companies.

== Partners ==
Some of its partners include:

- Stone Family Foundation
- Pentair Foundation
- Conrad N. Hilton Foundation
- The Leona M. and Harry B. Helmsley Charitable Trust
- Uptime Global
- CBRE India
- ADP
- PepsiCo Foundation
- Global Water Center

== Offices ==
The network has offices in Accra, New Delhi and New York.

== See also ==
- Newman's Own Foundation
