= A. E. Hotchner =

American writer (1917–2020)

- Born: Aaron Edward Hotchner; June 28, 1917; St. Louis, Missouri, U.S.
- Died: February 15, 2020 (aged 102); Westport, Connecticut, U.S.
- Education: Washington University in St. Louis (AB, JD)
- Occupation: Writer
- Spouses: Geraldine Mavor (m. 1949; died 1969) Ursula Robbins (m. 1970; div. 1995) Virginia Kiser (m. 2003–2020)

Aaron Edward Hotchner (June 28, 1917 (Note: Not 1920, as is often seen, though that is a date he himself used.) – February 15, 2020) was an American editor, novelist, playwright, and biographer. He wrote many television screenplays as well as noted biographies of Doris Day and Ernest Hemingway. He co-founded the charity food company Newman's Own with actor Paul Newman.

== Early life ==
Hotchner was born in St. Louis, Missouri, the son of Sally (née Rossman), a synagogue/Sunday school administrator, and Samuel Hotchner, a jeweler. His family was Jewish. He attended Soldan High School. In 1940, he graduated from Washington University in St. Louis with degrees in history (A.B.) and law (J.D.). He was admitted to the Missouri State Bar in 1941, and briefly practiced law in St. Louis in 1941 and 1942.

After the United States entered World War II following the Attack on Pearl Harbor, he served from 1942 to 1945 in the U.S. Army Air Forces as a journalist, attaining the rank of major. When the war was over, he decided to forgo his law practice to pursue a career in writing.

== Literary career ==
Hotchner was an editor, biographer, novelist and playwright. In 1948, he met Ernest Hemingway, and the two were close friends until Hemingway died in 1961. Hotchner wrote his biography of Hemingway, Papa Hemingway, in 1966. He wrote teleplays in the 1950s and 1960s adapting Hemingway's The Snows of Kilimanjaro, The Killers, The Fifth Column, and After the Storm. Hotchner's biography of Doris Day, Doris Day: Her Own Story, was published in 1975.

The film King of the Hill (1993), directed by Steven Soderbergh, is a screen adaptation of Hotchner's 1973 autobiographical novel of the same name. A Depression-era, bildungsroman memoir, it tells the story of a boy struggling to survive on his own in a hotel in St. Louis, after his mother is committed to a sanatorium with tuberculosis and his younger brother is sent to live with an uncle. His father, a German immigrant and traveling salesman working for the Hamilton Watch Company, is off on long trips from which the boy cannot be certain he will return.

Hotchner's play The White House starred Helen Hayes in a Broadway production staged at Henry Miller's Theater in 1964. Hayes played multiple First Ladies from United States history. It was performed at the White House itself in 1996. In 1993, Welcome to the Club, a musical comedy written with composer Cy Coleman, appeared on Broadway. In addition, Hotchner wrote A Short Happy Life, The Hemingway Hero, Exactly Like You (written with Coleman), and The World of Nick Adams.

Hotchner's play Sweet Prince was produced off-Broadway in 1982, at the Theater Off-Park, starring Keir Dullea and Ian Abercrombie.

== Personal life and philanthropy ==
With actor Paul Newman, a friend and neighbor, Hotchner founded Newman's Own, Inc in 1982. All profits from this line of food products and other ventures are donated to charities. In 1988, Hotchner and Newman co-founded the Hole in the Wall Gang Camp, a residential summer camp and year-round center for seriously ill children located in Ashford, Connecticut. The original camp was later expanded to become a number of other Hole in the Wall Camps at other locations in the U.S., Ireland, France, and beyond. By 2016, there were 30 camps and programs serving the needs of over 130,000 children and families around the world, as part of the SeriousFun Children's Network.

Hotchner was honored with a star on the St. Louis Walk of Fame. He endowed the A. E. Hotchner Playwriting Festival, an annual playwriting competition open to undergraduate and graduate students at Washington University in St. Louis. The campus's "black box" theater is also named for him.

Hotchner resided with his wife Virginia Kiser in Westport, Connecticut, where he spent most weekends, and cared for a grey parrot. He was known for his collection of birds, and, outside his home in Westport, he had five peacocks. He loved to teach the kids on his road about the different birds and would sit and look at them often. He died on February 15, 2020, at the age of 102.

== Partial bibliography ==
- The Boyhood Memoirs of A. E. Hotchner: King of the Hill and Looking for Miracles (Missouri History Museum Press, 2007, ISBN 978-1-883982-60-7)
- The Dangerous American (Random House, 1958)
- Papa Hemingway (Random House, 1966)
- Treasure (Random House, 1970)
- King of the Hill (Harper & Row, 1973, ISBN 978-0-06-011964-5)
- Looking for Miracles: A Memoir about Loving (Harper & Row, 1975, ISBN 978-0-06-011965-2)
- Doris Day, Her Own Story (G. K. Hall, 1976, ISBN 978-0-8161-6391-5)
- Sophia, Living and Loving : Her Own Story (Morrow, 1979, ISBN 978-0-688-03428-3)
- The Man Who Lived at the Ritz (Putnam, 1981, ISBN 978-0-399-12651-2)
- Papa Hemingway : The Ecstasy and Sorrow (Morrow, 1983, ISBN 978-0-688-02041-5)
- Choice People : The Greats, Near-Greats, and Ingrates I Have Known (Morrow, 1984, ISBN 978-0-688-02215-0)
- Hemingway and His World (Vendome, 1989, ISBN 978-0-86565-115-9)
- Blown Away: The Rolling Stones and the Death of the Sixties (Simon & Schuster, 1990, ISBN 978-0-671-69316-9)
- Louisiana Purchase (Carroll & Graf, 1996, ISBN 978-0-7867-0309-8)
- The Day I Fired Alan Ladd and Other World War II Adventures (U. of Missouri Press, 2002, ISBN 978-0-8262-1432-4)
- Shameless Exploitation in Pursuit of the Common Good: the Madcap Business Adventure of the Truly Oddest Couple Paul Newman and A. E. Hotchner, (Random House, 2003, ISBN 978-0-385-51159-9).
- Everyone Comes to Elaine's (Harper Entertainment, 2004, ISBN 978-0-06-053818-7)
- Paul and Me: 53 Years of Adventures and Misadventures with My Pal Paul Newman (Random House Digital, 2010, ISBN 978-0-385-53234-1)
- O.J. in the Morning, G&T at Night (St. Martin's Press, 2013, ISBN 978-1-250-02821-1)
- Hemingway in Love (St. Martin's Press, 2015, ISBN 978-1-250-07748-6)
- The Amazing Adventures of Aaron Broom: A Novel, 2018, ISBN 978-0-385-54358-3

== Awards and honors ==
- Distinguished Alumni Award, Washington University School of Law, 1992.
- Honorary D.L., Washington University in St. Louis, 1993.
- Inductee, St. Louis Walk Of Fame.
