= Hamptons Hollywood Cafe =

Restaurant information
- Established: 1977
- Closed: 2002
- Food type: Hamburgers
- Location: 1324 N. Highland Avenue, Los Angeles, California

Hamptons Hollywood Cafe was a restaurant in Los Angeles that was opened in 1977 by actor Paul Newman and his friend Ron Buck. It closed in 2002 after changing ownership.

== History ==
In 1977, actor Paul Newman and artist Ron Buck opened a restaurant on Highland Avenue in a house that had been owned by Buck's mother. It was located near Paramount Studios, Warner Hollywood Studios, and the Chinese Theatre, and the restaurant was frequented by celebrities and members of the film industry. Customers with membership cards for an industry trade union were given a 10% discount, while talent agents were given a 10% surcharge. The restaurant was generally popular and received praise for the quality of its food.

The restaurant was originally named the Hamptons Hamburger Buffet, before changing names to the Hamptons Hollywood, and finally the Hamptons Hollywood Cafe. It was named after the Hamptons, a seaside area in Long Island, New York known for its resorts. Buck later opened a second location in Toluca Lake, Los Angeles. The restaurant's popularity declined in the late 1980s after Newman had stopped being involved with the restaurant and Buck had died. The Toluca Lake location was sold and renamed "Mo's". Mo's Fine Food continued to serve a similar menu as Hamptons, and opened a second location in Woodland Hills, Los Angeles in 1998.

In the 1990s, the original Hamptons restaurant was owned by screenwriter and former food critic Stanley Ralph Ross, with investment from other film industry personalities including writer Mark Evanier. The restaurant was renovated and its menu was updated, but it failed to turn a profit. The quality of the food during this time was reportedly variable. In 2002, it was bulldozed and a condominium was built in its place.

== Description ==
The restaurant originally had an enclosed patio with a large tree growing inside of it, rustic furniture and a large round table for writers to sit at during their lunch breaks. After it was sold in the 1990s, it was renovated with white walls and lattice over the ceiling.

It was considered an upscale restaurant, offering expensive wine and valet parking. The restaurant served hamburgers made with broiled 8 ounce meat patties that could be ordered as a choice of beef, turkey, bison, ostrich or other game meat. Burgers were served with a side of potato salad, pasta salad, green salad, or grain salad. Desserts included carrot cake and ice cream sundaes. Customers could select toppings and sides from a buffet table as they ate.

It was known for offering a large variety of toppings and condiments, including sour plum jam, teriyaki sauce, peanut butter, and caviar. Sauces and dressings used for the Newman's Own brand were developed in the restaurants test kitchen. The restaurant's menu had 28 specialty burgers, including the Frank's Fantasy (sour cream and caviar), the Golden Kazoo (broccoli, mushrooms, sauteed green onions, and melted cheddar), the ménage à trois (bacon, avocado, and cheese), and the White Delight (bacon and blue cheese). Some burgers were named after celebrity customers, like the "Phil Leeds" and the "Groo", which was named in honor of Groo the Wanderer creator Sergio Aragonés. Its menu had 340 total possible ingredient combinations.

The restaurant's menu was updated in the 1990s to be more health-conscious, with patties that had a lower fat content. The new owners also added cafe-style foods, like meatloaf, pasta, fish and chips, jalapeno poppers, and nachos.
