= 1987 Oakwood Homes 500 =

26th race of the 1987 NASCAR Winston Cup Series

Race details
- Race 26 of 29 in the 1987 NASCAR Winston Cup Series
- The 1987 Oakwood Homes 500 program cover. Artwork by NASCAR artist Sam Bass.
- Date: October 11, 1987
- Official name: 28th Annual Oakwood Homes 500
- Location: Concord, North Carolina, Charlotte Motor Speedway
- Course: Permanent racing facility
- Course length: 2.41 km (1.5 miles)
- Distance: 334 laps, 501 mi (806.281 km)
- Scheduled distance: 334 laps, 501 mi (806.281 km)
- Average speed: 128.443 miles per hour (206.709 km/h)
- Attendance: 137,200

Pole position
Driver	Bobby Allison	Stavola Brothers Racing
- Time: 31.462

Most laps led
Driver	Bobby Allison	Stavola Brothers Racing
- Laps: 142

Winner
No. 9	Bill Elliott	Melling Racing

Television in the United States
- Network: SETN
- Announcers: Eli Gold, Jerry Punch

Radio in the United States
- Radio: Motor Racing Network

The 1987 Oakwood Homes 500 was the 26th stock car race of the 1987 NASCAR Winston Cup Series season and the 28th iteration of the event. The race was held on Sunday, October 11, 1987, before an audience of 145,000 in Concord, North Carolina, at Charlotte Motor Speedway, a 1.5 miles (2.4 km) permanent quad-oval. The race took the scheduled 334 laps to complete.

With the assist of a fast final pit stop, Melling Racing's Bill Elliott managed to take the lead from the dominant Bobby Allison, leading the final 62 laps en route to his 21st career NASCAR Winston Cup Series victory and his fourth victory of the season. To fill out the top three, the aforementioned Bobby Allison and Hagan Racing's Sterling Marlin finished second and third, respectively.

Heading into the next race of the season, the 1987 AC Delco 500, Dale Earnhardt was the write-in champion for the driver's championship, only needing to start the next race to clinch the championship.

== Background ==
The layout of Charlotte Motor Speedway, the venue where the race was held.

Charlotte Motor Speedway is a motorsports complex located in Concord, North Carolina, United States 13 miles from Charlotte, North Carolina. The complex features a 1.5 miles (2.4 km) quad oval track that hosts NASCAR racing including the prestigious Coca-Cola 600 on Memorial Day weekend and the NEXTEL All-Star Challenge, as well as the UAW-GM Quality 500. The speedway was built in 1959 by Bruton Smith and is considered the home track for NASCAR with many race teams located in the Charlotte area. The track is owned and operated by Speedway Motorsports Inc. (SMI) with Marcus G. Smith (son of Bruton Smith) as track president.

=== Entry list ===
- (R) denotes rookie driver.

#	Driver	Team	Make	Sponsor
0	Delma Cowart	H. L. Waters Racing	Chevrolet	Heyward Grooms Construction
1	Brett Bodine	Ellington Racing	Chevrolet	Bull's-Eye Barbecue Sauce
2	Kirk Bryant	Bryant Racing	Chevrolet	Bryant Racing
3	Dale Earnhardt	Richard Childress Racing	Chevrolet	Wrangler
4	Rick Wilson	Morgan–McClure Motorsports	Oldsmobile	Kodak
5	Geoff Bodine	Hendrick Motorsports	Chevrolet	Levi Garrett
6	Connie Saylor	U.S. Racing	Chevrolet	U.S. Racing
7	Alan Kulwicki	AK Racing	Ford	Zerex
8	Bobby Hillin Jr.	Stavola Brothers Racing	Buick	Miller American
9	Bill Elliott	Melling Racing	Ford	Coors
11	Terry Labonte	Junior Johnson & Associates	Chevrolet	Budweiser
12	Rodney Combs (R)	Hamby Racing	Chevrolet	Hamby Racing
14	A. J. Foyt	A. J. Foyt Racing	Oldsmobile	Copenhagen
15	Ricky Rudd	Bud Moore Engineering	Ford	Motorcraft Quality Parts
16	Larry Pearson	Pearson Racing	Chevrolet	Chattanooga Chew
17	Darrell Waltrip	Hendrick Motorsports	Chevrolet	Tide
18	Dale Jarrett (R)	Freedlander Motorsports	Chevrolet	Freedlander Financial
19	Derrike Cope (R)	Stoke Racing	Ford	Stoke Racing
21	Kyle Petty	Wood Brothers Racing	Ford	Citgo
22	Bobby Allison	Stavola Brothers Racing	Buick	Miller American
26	Morgan Shepherd	King Racing	Buick	Quaker State
27	Rusty Wallace	Blue Max Racing	Pontiac	Kodiak
28	Davey Allison (R)	Ranier-Lundy Racing	Ford	Texaco, Havoline
29	Cale Yarborough	Cale Yarborough Motorsports	Oldsmobile	Hardee's
30	Michael Waltrip	Bahari Racing	Chevrolet	All Pro Auto Parts
31	Brad Teague	Bob Clark Motorsports	Oldsmobile	Slender You Figure Salons
32	Jonathan Lee Edwards	Edwards Racing	Chevrolet	Edwards Racing
33	Harry Gant	Mach 1 Racing	Chevrolet	Skoal Bandit
34	Eddie Bierschwale	AAG Racing	Chevrolet	Allen's Glass
35	Benny Parsons	Hendrick Motorsports	Chevrolet	Folgers Decaf
36	H. B. Bailey	Bailey Racing	Pontiac	Almeda Auto Parts
43	Richard Petty	Petty Enterprises	Pontiac	STP
44	Sterling Marlin	Hagan Racing	Oldsmobile	Piedmont Airlines
48	Tony Spanos	Hylton Motorsports	Chevrolet	Hylton Motorsports
50	Greg Sacks	Dingman Brothers Racing	Pontiac	Valvoline
52	Jimmy Means	Hendrick Motorsports	Chevrolet	Folgers
55	Phil Parsons	Jackson Bros. Motorsports	Oldsmobile	Skoal Classic
56	Ernie Irvan	Reno Enterprises	Chevrolet	Dale Earnhardt Chevrolet
62	Steve Christman (R)	Winkle Motorsports	Pontiac	AC Spark Plug
64	Trevor Boys	Langley Racing	Ford	Sunny King Ford
67	Buddy Arrington	Arrington Racing	Ford	Pannill Sweatshirts
70	J. D. McDuffie	McDuffie Racing	Pontiac	Rumple Furniture
71	Dave Marcis	Marcis Auto Racing	Chevrolet	Lifebuoy
73	Phil Barkdoll	Barkdoll Racing	Chevrolet	Barkdoll Racing
74	Bobby Wawak	Wawak Racing	Chevrolet	Wawak Racing
75	Neil Bonnett	RahMoc Enterprises	Pontiac	Valvoline
77	Ken Ragan	Ragan Racing	Ford	Sylvan Resort
82	Mark Stahl	Stahl Racing	Ford	Auto Bell Car Wash
83	Lake Speed	Speed Racing	Oldsmobile	Wynn's, Kmart
87	Randy Baker	Buck Baker Racing	Chevrolet	Sony
88	Buddy Baker	Baker–Schiff Racing	Oldsmobile	Crisco
89	Jim Sauter	Mueller Brothers Racing	Pontiac	Evinrude Outboard Motors
90	Ken Schrader	Donlavey Racing	Ford	Red Baron Frozen Pizza
91	Philip Duffie	Duffie Racing	Buick	Duffie Racing
93	Charlie Baker	Salmon Racing	Chevrolet	Salmon Racing

== Qualifying ==
Qualifying was split into two rounds. The first round was held on Wednesday, October 7, at 3:00 PM EST. Each driver had one lap to set a time. During the first round, the top 20 drivers in the round were guaranteed a starting spot in the race. If a driver was not able to guarantee a spot in the first round, they had the option to scrub their time from the first round and try and run a faster lap time in a second round qualifying run, held on Thursday, October 8, at 2:00 PM EST. As with the first round, each driver had one lap to set a time. For this specific race, positions 21-40 were decided on time, and depending on who needed it, a select amount of positions were given to cars who had not otherwise qualified but were high enough in owner's points; up to two provisionals were given.

Bobby Allison, driving for Stavola Brothers Racing, managed to win the pole, setting a time of 31.462 and an average speed of 171.636 miles per hour (276.221 km/h) in the first round.

13 drivers failed to qualify.

=== Full qualifying results ===
Pos.	#	Driver	Team	Make	Time	Speed
1	22	Bobby Allison	Stavola Brothers Racing	Buick	31.462	171.636
2	35	Benny Parsons	Hendrick Motorsports	Chevrolet	31.702	170.336
3	5	Geoff Bodine	Hendrick Motorsports	Chevrolet	31.965	168.935
4	33	Harry Gant	Mach 1 Racing	Chevrolet	32.008	168.708
5	52	Jimmy Means	Hendrick Motorsports	Chevrolet	32.091	168.274
6	55	Phil Parsons	Jackson Bros. Motorsports	Oldsmobile	32.110	168.172
7	9	Bill Elliott	Melling Racing	Ford	32.121	168.117
8	11	Terry Labonte	Junior Johnson & Associates	Chevrolet	32.130	168.065
9	3	Dale Earnhardt	Richard Childress Racing	Chevrolet	32.164	167.890
10	28	Davey Allison (R)	Ranier-Lundy Racing	Ford	32.174	167.840
11	19	Derrike Cope (R)	Stoke Racing	Ford	32.243	167.476
12	90	Ken Schrader	Donlavey Racing	Ford	32.276	167.307
13	21	Kyle Petty	Wood Brothers Racing	Ford	32.305	167.159
14	7	Alan Kulwicki	AK Racing	Ford	32.374	166.801
15	50	Greg Sacks	Dingman Brothers Racing	Pontiac	32.382	166.757
16	1	Brett Bodine	Ellington Racing	Chevrolet	32.391	166.713
17	17	Darrell Waltrip	Hendrick Motorsports	Chevrolet	32.425	166.538
18	8	Bobby Hillin Jr.	Stavola Brothers Racing	Buick	32.426	166.536
19	27	Rusty Wallace	Blue Max Racing	Pontiac	32.462	166.351
20	77	Ken Ragan	Ragan Racing	Ford	32.487	166.220
Failed to lock in Round 1
21	4	Rick Wilson	Morgan–McClure Motorsports	Oldsmobile	31.671	170.503
22	26	Morgan Shepherd	King Racing	Buick	31.717	170.256
23	14	A. J. Foyt	A. J. Foyt Racing	Oldsmobile	31.806	169.779
24	83	Lake Speed	Speed Racing	Oldsmobile	31.826	169.673
25	29	Cale Yarborough	Cale Yarborough Motorsports	Oldsmobile	31.857	169.507
26	88	Buddy Baker	Baker–Schiff Racing	Oldsmobile	31.916	169.194
27	15	Ricky Rudd	Bud Moore Engineering	Ford	31.940	169.067
28	75	Neil Bonnett	RahMoc Enterprises	Pontiac	31.979	168.861
29	67	Buddy Arrington	Arrington Racing	Ford	31.995	168.776
30	6	Connie Saylor	U.S. Racing	Chevrolet	32.066	168.403
31	44	Sterling Marlin	Hagan Racing	Oldsmobile	32.069	168.387
32	30	Michael Waltrip	Bahari Racing	Chevrolet	32.086	168.298
33	16	Larry Pearson	Pearson Racing	Chevrolet	32.089	168.282
34	71	Dave Marcis	Marcis Auto Racing	Chevrolet	32.123	168.104
35	31	Brad Teague	Bob Clark Motorsports	Oldsmobile	32.139	168.020
36	56	Ernie Irvan	Reno Enterprises	Chevrolet	32.220	167.598
37	82	Mark Stahl	Stahl Racing	Ford	32.227	167.561
38	12	Rodney Combs (R)	Hamby Racing	Chevrolet	32.245	167.468
39	64	Trevor Boys	Langley Racing	Ford	32.252	167.431
40	18	Dale Jarrett (R)	Freedlander Motorsports	Chevrolet	32.278	167.297
Provisionals
41	43	Richard Petty	Petty Enterprises	Pontiac	32.328	167.038
42	62	Steve Christman (R)	Winkle Motorsports	Pontiac	-	-
Failed to qualify
43	89	Jim Sauter	Mueller Brothers Racing	Pontiac	-*	-*
44	36	H. B. Bailey	Bailey Racing	Pontiac	-*	-*
45	34	Eddie Bierschwale	AAG Racing	Chevrolet	-*	-*
46	74	Bobby Wawak	Wawak Racing	Chevrolet	-*	-*
47	2	Kirk Bryant	Bryant Racing	Chevrolet	-*	-*
48	91	Philip Duffie	Duffie Racing	Buick	-*	-*
49	73	Phil Barkdoll	Barkdoll Racing	Chevrolet	-*	-*
50	93	Charlie Baker	Salmon Racing	Chevrolet	-*	-*
51	70	J. D. McDuffie	McDuffie Racing	Pontiac	-*	-*
52	87	Randy Baker	Buck Baker Racing	Chevrolet	-*	-*
53	0	Delma Cowart	H. L. Waters Racing	Chevrolet	-*	-*
54	32	Jonathan Lee Edwards	Edwards Racing	Chevrolet	-*	-*
55	48	Tony Spanos	Hylton Motorsports	Chevrolet	-*	-*
Official first round qualifying results
Official starting lineup

== Race results ==
Fin	St	#	Driver	Team	Make	Laps	Led	Status	Pts	Winnings
1	7	9	Bill Elliott	Melling Racing	Ford	334	62	running	180	$74,040
2	1	22	Bobby Allison	Stavola Brothers Racing	Buick	334	142	running	180	$67,765
3	31	44	Sterling Marlin	Hagan Racing	Oldsmobile	334	1	running	170	$34,770
4	8	11	Terry Labonte	Junior Johnson & Associates	Chevrolet	333	16	running	165	$30,240
5	41	43	Richard Petty	Petty Enterprises	Pontiac	333	0	running	155	$31,860
6	33	16	Larry Pearson	Pearson Racing	Chevrolet	333	1	running	155	$13,040
7	24	83	Lake Speed	Speed Racing	Oldsmobile	332	0	running	146	$10,190
8	36	56	Ernie Irvan	Reno Enterprises	Chevrolet	332	1	running	147	$9,015
9	17	17	Darrell Waltrip	Hendrick Motorsports	Chevrolet	331	0	running	138	$10,365
10	13	21	Kyle Petty	Wood Brothers Racing	Ford	330	1	running	139	$16,265
11	27	15	Ricky Rudd	Bud Moore Engineering	Ford	329	0	running	130	$15,190
12	9	3	Dale Earnhardt	Richard Childress Racing	Chevrolet	329	2	running	132	$16,440
13	35	31	Brad Teague	Bob Clark Motorsports	Oldsmobile	328	17	running	129	$5,790
14	29	67	Buddy Arrington	Arrington Racing	Ford	319	0	running	121	$9,705
15	42	62	Steve Christman (R)	Winkle Motorsports	Pontiac	303	0	brakes	118	$6,590
16	30	6	Connie Saylor	U.S. Racing	Chevrolet	301	0	running	115	$9,145
17	12	90	Ken Schrader	Donlavey Racing	Ford	291	0	running	112	$8,925
18	34	71	Dave Marcis	Marcis Auto Racing	Chevrolet	287	1	running	114	$8,665
19	10	28	Davey Allison (R)	Ranier-Lundy Racing	Ford	279	0	engine	106	$5,190
20	22	26	Morgan Shepherd	King Racing	Buick	228	42	engine	108	$8,755
21	23	14	A. J. Foyt	A. J. Foyt Racing	Oldsmobile	224	1	engine	105	$4,365
22	19	27	Rusty Wallace	Blue Max Racing	Pontiac	223	24	engine	102	$12,065
23	37	82	Mark Stahl	Stahl Racing	Ford	216	0	overheating	94	$3,765
24	25	29	Cale Yarborough	Cale Yarborough Motorsports	Oldsmobile	214	0	running	91	$3,565
25	39	64	Trevor Boys	Langley Racing	Ford	212	1	engine	0	$6,670
26	20	77	Ken Ragan	Ragan Racing	Ford	196	0	crash	85	$3,215
27	6	55	Phil Parsons	Jackson Bros. Motorsports	Oldsmobile	194	0	running	82	$3,765
28	18	8	Bobby Hillin Jr.	Stavola Brothers Racing	Buick	129	0	crash	79	$9,915
29	14	7	Alan Kulwicki	AK Racing	Ford	127	0	crash	76	$6,835
30	21	4	Rick Wilson	Morgan–McClure Motorsports	Oldsmobile	125	20	crash	78	$3,215
31	3	5	Geoff Bodine	Hendrick Motorsports	Chevrolet	125	1	crash	75	$13,140
32	16	1	Brett Bodine	Ellington Racing	Chevrolet	125	0	crash	67	$2,565
33	4	33	Harry Gant	Mach 1 Racing	Chevrolet	117	0	engine	64	$7,815
34	40	18	Dale Jarrett (R)	Freedlander Motorsports	Chevrolet	102	0	engine	61	$5,285
35	32	30	Michael Waltrip	Bahari Racing	Chevrolet	82	0	engine	58	$5,265
36	28	75	Neil Bonnett	RahMoc Enterprises	Pontiac	56	0	crash	55	$5,985
37	38	12	Rodney Combs (R)	Hamby Racing	Chevrolet	43	0	engine	0	$4,490
38	2	35	Benny Parsons	Hendrick Motorsports	Chevrolet	42	1	engine	54	$16,680
39	11	19	Derrike Cope (R)	Stoke Racing	Ford	20	0	crash	46	$2,470
40	5	52	Jimmy Means	Hendrick Motorsports	Chevrolet	20	0	crash	43	$5,960
41	26	88	Buddy Baker	Baker–Schiff Racing	Oldsmobile	20	0	crash	40	$2,460
42	15	50	Greg Sacks	Dingman Brothers Racing	Pontiac	20	0	crash	37	$2,460
Failed to qualify
43		89	Jim Sauter	Mueller Brothers Racing	Pontiac					
44		36	H. B. Bailey	Bailey Racing	Pontiac					
45		34	Eddie Bierschwale	AAG Racing	Chevrolet					
46		74	Bobby Wawak	Wawak Racing	Chevrolet					
47		2	Kirk Bryant	Bryant Racing	Chevrolet					
48		91	Philip Duffie	Duffie Racing	Buick					
49		73	Phil Barkdoll	Barkdoll Racing	Chevrolet					
50		93	Charlie Baker	Salmon Racing	Chevrolet					
51		70	J. D. McDuffie	McDuffie Racing	Pontiac					
52		87	Randy Baker	Buck Baker Racing	Chevrolet					
53		0	Delma Cowart	H. L. Waters Racing	Chevrolet					
54		32	Jonathan Lee Edwards	Edwards Racing	Chevrolet					
55		48	Tony Spanos	Hylton Motorsports	Chevrolet					
Official race results

== Standings after the race ==
Drivers' Championship standings

	Pos	Driver	Points
	1	Dale Earnhardt	4,268
	2	Bill Elliott	3,743 (-525)
	3	Terry Labonte	3,611 (-657)
	4	Darrell Waltrip	3,477 (–791)
1	5	Ricky Rudd	3,422 (–846)
1	6	Rusty Wallace	3,384 (–884)
1	7	Richard Petty	3,363 (–905)
3	8	Neil Bonnett	3,352 (–916)
	9	Kyle Petty	3,293 (–975)
1	10	Bobby Allison	3,161 (–1,107)
Official driver's standings

- Note: Only the first 10 positions are included for the driver standings.

Previous race: 1987 Holly Farms 400	NASCAR Winston Cup Series; 1987 season	Next race: 1987 AC Delco 500
