= 1987 AC Delco 500 =

27th race of the 1987 NASCAR Winston Cup Series

Race details
- Race 27 of 29 in the 1987 NASCAR Winston Cup Series
- The 1987 AC Delco 500 program cover.
- Date: October 25, 1987
- Official name: 23rd Annual AC Delco 500
- Location: Rockingham, North Carolina, North Carolina Motor Speedway
- Course: Permanent racing facility
- Course length: 1.636 km (1.017 miles)
- Distance: 492 laps, 500.364 mi (805.257 km)
- Scheduled distance: 492 laps, 500.364 mi (805.257 km)
- Average speed: 118.258 miles per hour (190.318 km/h)
- Attendance: 60,000

Pole position
Driver	Davey Allison	Ranier-Lundy Racing
- Time: 25.144

Most laps led
Driver	Bill Elliott	Melling Racing
- Laps: 237

Winner
No. 9	Bill Elliott	Melling Racing

Television in the United States
- Network: TBS
- Announcers: Ken Squier, Lake Speed, Johnny Hayes

Radio in the United States
- Radio: Motor Racing Network

The 1987 AC Delco 500 was the 27th stock car race of the 1987 NASCAR Winston Cup Series season and the 23rd iteration of the event. The race was held on Sunday, October 25, 1987, before an audience of 60,000 in Rockingham, North Carolina, at North Carolina Speedway, a 1.017 miles (1.637 km) permanent high-banked racetrack.

By race's end, Melling Racing's Bill Elliott managed to dominate the late stages of the race, leading the final 218 of the 271 laps to take his 22nd career NASCAR Winston Cup Series victory and his fifth victory of the season. To fill out the top three, Richard Childress Racing's Dale Earnhardt and Hendrick Motorsports' Darrell Waltrip finished second and third, respectively.

By starting the race, Dale Earnhardt clinched the NASCAR Winston Cup Series driver's championship, after completing a dominant season. The championship was Earnhardt's third overall driver's championship and his second in a row.

== Background ==
The layout of North Carolina Motor Speedway, the venue where the race was held.

North Carolina Motor Speedway was opened as a flat, one-mile oval on October 31, 1965. In 1969, the track was extensively reconfigured to a high-banked, D-shaped oval just over one mile in length. In 1997, North Carolina Motor Speedway merged with Penske Motorsports, and was renamed North Carolina Speedway. Shortly thereafter, the infield was reconfigured, and competition on the infield road course, mostly by the SCCA, was discontinued. Currently, the track is home to the Fast Track High Performance Driving School.

=== Entry list ===
- (R) denotes rookie driver.

#	Driver	Team	Make	Sponsor
1	Brett Bodine	Ellington Racing	Chevrolet	Bull's-Eye Barbecue Sauce
2	Kirk Bryant	Bryant Racing	Chevrolet	Bryant Racing
3	Dale Earnhardt	Richard Childress Racing	Chevrolet	Wrangler
5	Geoff Bodine	Hendrick Motorsports	Chevrolet	Levi Garrett
6	Connie Saylor	U.S. Racing	Chevrolet	U.S. Racing
7	Alan Kulwicki	AK Racing	Ford	Zerex
8	Bobby Hillin Jr.	Stavola Brothers Racing	Buick	Miller American
08	Butch Miller	Throop Racing	Chevrolet	Throop Racing
9	Bill Elliott	Melling Racing	Ford	Coors
11	Terry Labonte	Junior Johnson & Associates	Chevrolet	Budweiser
12	Trevor Boys	Hamby Racing	Chevrolet	Hamby Racing
15	Ricky Rudd	Bud Moore Engineering	Ford	Motorcraft Quality Parts
17	Darrell Waltrip	Hendrick Motorsports	Chevrolet	Tide
18	Dale Jarrett (R)	Freedlander Motorsports	Chevrolet	Coats & Clark
21	Kyle Petty	Wood Brothers Racing	Ford	Citgo
22	Bobby Allison	Stavola Brothers Racing	Buick	Miller American
26	Morgan Shepherd	King Racing	Buick	Quaker State
27	Rusty Wallace	Blue Max Racing	Pontiac	Kodiak
28	Davey Allison (R)	Ranier-Lundy Racing	Ford	Texaco, Havoline
29	Cale Yarborough	Cale Yarborough Motorsports	Oldsmobile	Hardee's
30	Michael Waltrip	Bahari Racing	Chevrolet	All Pro Auto Parts
33	Harry Gant	Mach 1 Racing	Chevrolet	Skoal Bandit
35	Benny Parsons	Hendrick Motorsports	Chevrolet	Folgers Decaf
41	Ronnie Thomas	Ronnie Thomas Racing	Chevrolet	Busch Enterprises
43	Richard Petty	Petty Enterprises	Pontiac	STP
44	Sterling Marlin	Hagan Racing	Oldsmobile	Piedmont Airlines
50	Greg Sacks	Dingman Brothers Racing	Pontiac	Valvoline
51	David Simko	Simko Racing	Chevrolet	Metro 25 Car Care Center
52	Jimmy Means	Hendrick Motorsports	Chevrolet	Eureka
55	Phil Parsons	Jackson Bros. Motorsports	Oldsmobile	Skoal Classic
62	Steve Christman (R)	Winkle Motorsports	Pontiac	AC Spark Plug
64	Curtis Markham	Langley Racing	Ford	Sunny King Ford
67	Buddy Arrington	Arrington Racing	Ford	Pannill Sweatshirts
70	J. D. McDuffie	McDuffie Racing	Pontiac	Rumple Furniture
71	Dave Marcis	Marcis Auto Racing	Chevrolet	Lifebuoy
74	Bobby Wawak	Wawak Racing	Chevrolet	Wawak Racing
75	Joe Ruttman	RahMoc Enterprises	Pontiac	Valvoline
76	Hut Stricklin	Jaehne Motorsports	Chevrolet	Jaehne Motorsports
80	Eddie Bierschwale	S&H Racing	Chevrolet	S&H Racing
82	Mark Stahl	Stahl Racing	Ford	Auto Bell Car Wash
88	Buddy Baker	Baker–Schiff Racing	Oldsmobile	Crisco
90	Ken Schrader	Donlavey Racing	Ford	Red Baron Frozen Pizza
93	Charlie Baker	Salmon Racing	Chevrolet	Salmon Racing
97	D. Wayne Strout	Strout Racing	Chevrolet	Strout Racing

== Qualifying ==
Qualifying was split into two rounds. The first round was held on Thursday, October 22, at 4:00 PM EST. Each driver had one lap to set a time. During the first round, the top 20 drivers in the round were guaranteed a starting spot in the race. If a driver was not able to guarantee a spot in the first round, they had the option to scrub their time from the first round and try and run a faster lap time in a second round qualifying run, held on Saturday, October 23, at 2:00 PM EST. As with the first round, each driver had one lap to set a time. For this specific race, positions 21-40 were decided on time, and depending on who needed it, a select amount of positions were given to cars who had not otherwise qualified but were high enough in owner's points; up to two were given.

Davey Allison, driving for Ranier-Lundy Racing, managed to win the pole, setting a time of 25.144 and an average speed of 145.609 miles per hour (234.335 km/h) in the first round.

Two drivers failed to qualify. One driver who failed to qualify, D. Wayne Strout, crashed his car in a Friday morning practice session. Strout later reported to The Charlotte Observer that the crash was severe enough to the point where he couldn't remember the crash.

=== Full qualifying results ===
Pos.	#	Driver	Team	Make	Time	Speed
1	28	Davey Allison (R)	Ranier-Lundy Racing	Ford	25.144	145.609
2	3	Dale Earnhardt	Richard Childress Racing	Chevrolet	25.211	145.222
3	9	Bill Elliott	Melling Racing	Ford	25.289	144.774
4	44	Sterling Marlin	Hagan Racing	Chevrolet	25.352	144.415
5	22	Bobby Allison	Stavola Brothers Racing	Buick	25.364	144.346
6	26	Morgan Shepherd	King Racing	Buick	25.365	144.341
7	15	Ricky Rudd	Bud Moore Engineering	Ford	25.409	144.091
8	21	Kyle Petty	Wood Brothers Racing	Ford	25.418	144.040
9	1	Brett Bodine	Ellington Racing	Chevrolet	25.460	143.802
10	17	Darrell Waltrip	Hendrick Motorsports	Chevrolet	25.477	143.706
11	7	Alan Kulwicki	AK Racing	Ford	25.503	143.560
12	5	Geoff Bodine	Hendrick Motorsports	Chevrolet	25.507	143.537
13	75	Joe Ruttman	RahMoc Enterprises	Pontiac	25.517	143.481
14	11	Terry Labonte	Junior Johnson & Associates	Chevrolet	25.522	143.453
15	88	Buddy Baker	Baker–Schiff Racing	Chevrolet	25.556	143.262
16	90	Ken Schrader	Donlavey Racing	Ford	25.569	143.189
17	27	Rusty Wallace	Blue Max Racing	Pontiac	25.574	143.161
18	30	Michael Waltrip	Bahari Racing	Chevrolet	25.650	142.737
19	29	Cale Yarborough	Cale Yarborough Motorsports	Chevrolet	25.661	142.676
20	18	Dale Jarrett (R)	Freedlander Motorsports	Chevrolet	25.688	142.525
21	80	Eddie Bierschwale	S&H Racing	Chevrolet	25.734	142.271
22	35	Benny Parsons	Hendrick Motorsports	Chevrolet	25.779	142.023
23	8	Bobby Hillin Jr.	Stavola Brothers Racing	Buick	25.846	141.654
24	2	Kirk Bryant	Bryant Racing	Pontiac	25.870	141.526
25	55	Phil Parsons	Jackson Bros. Motorsports	Chevrolet	25.919	141.255
26	33	Harry Gant	Mach 1 Racing	Chevrolet	25.963	141.016
27	50	Greg Sacks	Dingman Brothers Racing	Pontiac	25.975	140.951
28	74	Bobby Wawak	Wawak Racing	Chevrolet	26.152	139.997
29	67	Buddy Arrington	Arrington Racing	Ford	26.239	139.533
30	64	Curtis Markham	Langley Racing	Ford	26.254	139.453
31	41	Ronnie Thomas	Ronnie Thomas Racing	Chevrolet	26.291	139.257
32	51	David Simko	Simko Racing	Chevrolet	26.302	139.199
33	6	Connie Saylor	U.S. Racing	Chevrolet	26.365	138.866
34	08	Butch Miller	Throop Racing	Chevrolet	26.403	138.666
35	70	J. D. McDuffie	McDuffie Racing	Pontiac	26.467	138.331
36	43	Richard Petty	Petty Enterprises	Pontiac	26.506	138.127
37	76	Hut Stricklin	Jaehne Motorsports	Chevrolet	26.509	138.112
38	82	Mark Stahl	Stahl Racing	Ford	26.560	137.846
39	52	Jimmy Means	Jimmy Means Racing	Pontiac	26.636	137.453
40	12	Trevor Boys	Hamby Racing	Chevrolet	26.669	137.283
Provisionals
41	71	Dave Marcis	Marcis Auto Racing	Chevrolet	-*	-*
42	62	Steve Christman (R)	Winkle Motorsports	Pontiac	-*	-*
Failed to qualify
43	93	Charlie Baker	Salmon Racing	Chevrolet	-*	-*
44	97	D. Wayne Strout	Strout Racing	Chevrolet	-	-
Official first round qualifying results
Official starting lineup

== Race results ==
Fin	St	#	Driver	Team	Make	Laps	Led	Status	Pts	Winnings
1	3	9	Bill Elliott	Melling Racing	Ford	492	237	running	185	$50,025
2	2	3	Dale Earnhardt	Richard Childress Racing	Chevrolet	492	122	running	175	$38,915
3	10	17	Darrell Waltrip	Hendrick Motorsports	Chevrolet	492	5	running	170	$16,690
4	14	11	Terry Labonte	Junior Johnson & Associates	Chevrolet	492	61	running	165	$19,315
5	6	26	Morgan Shepherd	King Racing	Buick	492	30	running	160	$16,160
6	8	21	Kyle Petty	Wood Brothers Racing	Ford	492	5	running	155	$12,580
7	15	88	Buddy Baker	Baker–Schiff Racing	Chevrolet	492	1	running	151	$7,030
8	12	5	Geoff Bodine	Hendrick Motorsports	Chevrolet	490	5	running	147	$11,680
9	25	55	Phil Parsons	Jackson Bros. Motorsports	Chevrolet	490	0	running	138	$6,055
10	13	75	Joe Ruttman	RahMoc Enterprises	Pontiac	490	0	running	0	$9,880
11	4	44	Sterling Marlin	Hagan Racing	Chevrolet	489	0	running	130	$8,050
12	17	27	Rusty Wallace	Blue Max Racing	Pontiac	489	0	running	127	$11,785
13	26	33	Harry Gant	Mach 1 Racing	Chevrolet	489	0	running	124	$8,090
14	16	90	Ken Schrader	Donlavey Racing	Ford	487	0	running	121	$7,220
15	22	35	Benny Parsons	Hendrick Motorsports	Chevrolet	486	0	running	118	$12,725
16	20	18	Dale Jarrett (R)	Freedlander Motorsports	Chevrolet	486	0	running	115	$7,460
17	36	43	Richard Petty	Petty Enterprises	Pontiac	486	0	running	112	$6,300
18	11	7	Alan Kulwicki	AK Racing	Ford	485	1	running	114	$6,940
19	18	30	Michael Waltrip	Bahari Racing	Chevrolet	484	0	running	106	$5,580
20	39	52	Jimmy Means	Jimmy Means Racing	Pontiac	481	0	running	103	$5,710
21	40	12	Trevor Boys	Hamby Racing	Chevrolet	480	0	running	100	$4,990
22	41	71	Dave Marcis	Marcis Auto Racing	Chevrolet	476	0	running	97	$4,905
23	21	80	Eddie Bierschwale	S&H Racing	Chevrolet	475	0	running	94	$2,075
24	29	67	Buddy Arrington	Arrington Racing	Ford	473	0	running	91	$4,735
25	33	6	Connie Saylor	U.S. Racing	Chevrolet	460	0	running	0	$4,025
26	31	41	Ronnie Thomas	Ronnie Thomas Racing	Chevrolet	400	0	engine	85	$1,875
27	27	50	Greg Sacks	Dingman Brothers Racing	Pontiac	396	0	running	82	$1,850
28	38	82	Mark Stahl	Stahl Racing	Ford	390	0	running	79	$1,775
29	37	76	Hut Stricklin	Jaehne Motorsports	Chevrolet	383	0	engine	76	$1,700
30	30	64	Curtis Markham	Langley Racing	Ford	346	0	overheating	73	$3,650
31	7	15	Ricky Rudd	Bud Moore Engineering	Ford	342	3	engine	75	$9,985
32	42	62	Steve Christman (R)	Winkle Motorsports	Pontiac	320	0	crash	67	$1,535
33	23	8	Bobby Hillin Jr.	Stavola Brothers Racing	Buick	299	0	engine	64	$11,465
34	24	2	Kirk Bryant	Bryant Racing	Pontiac	205	0	engine	61	$1,415
35	32	51	David Simko	Simko Racing	Chevrolet	184	0	engine	58	$1,365
36	28	74	Bobby Wawak	Wawak Racing	Chevrolet	168	0	engine	55	$1,335
37	19	29	Cale Yarborough	Cale Yarborough Motorsports	Chevrolet	151	0	engine	52	$1,310
38	5	22	Bobby Allison	Stavola Brothers Racing	Buick	135	0	engine	49	$9,785
39	34	08	Butch Miller	Throop Racing	Chevrolet	125	0	transmission	46	$1,260
40	35	70	J. D. McDuffie	McDuffie Racing	Pontiac	116	0	engine	43	$1,235
41	9	1	Brett Bodine	Ellington Racing	Chevrolet	110	0	crash	40	$1,235
42	1	28	Davey Allison (R)	Ranier-Lundy Racing	Ford	74	22	gear	42	$5,985
Failed to qualify
43		93	Charlie Baker	Salmon Racing	Chevrolet					
44		97	D. Wayne Strout	Strout Racing	Chevrolet					
Official race results

== Standings after the race ==
Drivers' Championship standings

	Pos	Driver	Points
	1	Dale Earnhardt	4,443
	2	Bill Elliott	3,928 (-515)
	3	Terry Labonte	3,776 (-667)
	4	Darrell Waltrip	3,647 (–796)
1	5	Rusty Wallace	3,511 (–932)
1	6	Ricky Rudd	3,497 (–946)
	7	Richard Petty	3,475 (–968)
1	8	Kyle Petty	3,448 (–995)
1	9	Neil Bonnett	3,352 (–1,091)
1	10	Ken Schrader	3,266 (–1,177)
Official driver's standings

- Note: Only the first 10 positions are included for the driver standings.

Previous race: 1987 Oakwood Homes 500	NASCAR Winston Cup Series; 1987 season	Next race: 1987 Winston Western 500
