= John Bosco Secondary School =

Catholic school in Glasgow, Scotland (1975–1997)

Coordinates: 55.840935°N 4.242747°W

Information
- Type: Comprehensive
- Religious affiliation: Roman Catholic
- Established: 1974
- Closed: 1997
- Gender: Co-educational
- Language: English

John Bosco Secondary School was a Catholic Secondary School in the Oatlands area of Glasgow in Scotland. Named in honour of John Bosco, it was located at Wolseley Street, close to Richmond Park. The campus was designed by architect John Morton Cochrane of Honeyman, Jack & Robertson Architectural Practice. The design and build incorporated the building of the former St. Bonaventure's Junior Secondary School. It was commissioned by The Corporation of Glasgow Education Department and was officially opened on 12 November 1974 by the Archbishop of Glasgow, Thomas Winning.

The school had a catchment area of south-eastern Glasgow: Oatlands, the Gorbals, Hutchesontown, Govanhill and Toryglen. Due to changes in demographics, the pupil numbers dropped over a number of years. By 1996 there were only about 300 pupils at the school, from an original roll of 1000.

In 1994 the school tried to opt out of local governance, but Ian Lang, Secretary of State for Scotland, opposed this.

The school closed in 1997; the districts it served now fall within the catchment of Holyrood Secondary School in Crosshill.

== Notable former pupils ==
- Susan Boyle (Clinical Psychologist), former Lead Coordinator of the award-winning Glasgow & Clyde Weight Management Service (NHS).
- Paddy Connolly, former professional footballer and coach. He played for Dundee United, St Johnstone, Airdrieonians, Greenock Morton, Ayr United, Stirling Albion and Brechin City, made three appearances for Scotland under-21s.
- Owen Coyle, Professional Football Manager (Indian Super League club Jamshedpur FC). He played as a striker for Airdrionians, Bolton Wanderers, Dundee United and Motherwell, and made one appearance for the Republic of Ireland national team.
- Tony Deeney, Author. Winner of the Mervyn Peake Award 2016.
- Paul Ferry, best known for his role as Sandy McKinley in the BBC Two drama series Maggie, who lost his life in a car accident at the age of 16 in 1981, while still a pupil at the school.
- Des Hamilton (casting director), winner of BAFTA for Top Boy, former actor.
- Michael Matheson, Scottish Cabinet Secretary for Transport, Infrastructure and Connectivity, having previously served as the Cabinet Secretary for Justice from 2014 to 2018. He has represented Central Scotland and, since 2007, the Falkirk West constituency.
- Tony McDaid, executive director of Education Resources, South Lanarkshire Council (former pupil and teacher).
- Frank McLintock, former professional footballer and pundit. He played for Arsenal, Shawfield, Leicester City, Queens Park Rangers, 14 caps for Scotland. He attended St Bonaventure's School, prior to it being extended and being renamed John Bosco.
- Joe Mullaney, best known for his role as Ronnie Witherspoon in Restless Natives (1985)
- John Spencer, former professional footballer and coach. He played for Rangers, Chelsea, Everton, Greenock Morton, Lai Sun, QPR and Colorado Rapids, 14 caps for Scotland
