= Ueli Steiger =

Swiss cinematographer (born 1954)

- Born: Ulrich Steiger; 5 August 1954 (age 72); Zurich, Switzerland
- Education: London Film School
- Years active: 1979–2018

Ulrich ”Ueli" Steiger (born 5 August 1954 in Zurich, Switzerland) is a Swiss cinematographer.

== Life and career ==
Steiger studied English and art history at the University of Zurich before entering the London Film School.

After freelancing as camera assistant and documentary filmmaker in Switzerland, he worked in his first feature film Privileged as a camera operator.

Since 2000, Steiger has been a member of the American Society of Cinematographers.

== Filmography ==
Film

Year	Title	Director	Notes
1984	Der Räuber	Lutz Leonhardt	With Martin Fuhrer
1987	Promised Land	Michael Hoffman	With Alexander Gruszynski
1987	Warten auf Susi	Pascal Verdosci	Short film
1988	Some Girls	Michael Hoffman	
1990	The Hot Spot	Dennis Hopper	
1991	Soapdish	Michael Hoffman	
1992	Singles	Cameron Crowe	With Tak Fujimoto
1994	Chasers	Dennis Hopper	
1995	The Jerky Boys: The Movie	James Melkonian	
1995	Now and Then	Lesli Linka Glatter	
1996	House Arrest	Harry Winer	
1998	Godzilla	Roland Emmerich	
1999	Austin Powers: The Spy Who Shagged Me	Jay Roach	
1999	Bowfinger	Frank Oz	
2001	Just Visiting	Jean-Marie Poiré	
2001	Rock Star	Stephen Herek	
2001	Black Knight	Gil Junger	
2002	Stealing Harvard	Bruce McCulloch	
2004	The Day After Tomorrow	Roland Emmerich	
2005	Nomad	Sergei Bodrov; Ivan Passer	With Dan Laustsen
2008	10,000 BC	Roland Emmerich	
2009	The Maiden Heist	Peter Hewitt	
2009	From Beginning to End	Aluizio Abranches	
2010	Friendship!	Markus Goller	
2010	Astral City: A Spiritual Journey	Wagner de Assis	
2011	Eine ganz heiße Nummer	Markus Goller	
2012	Vatertage – Opa über Nacht	Ingo Rasper	
2013	Frau Ella	Markus Goller	
2014	Amapola	Eugenio Zanetti	
2014	Alles ist Liebe	Markus Goller	
2016	Stadtlandliebe	Marco Kreuzpaintner	
2017	Simpel	Markus Goller	
2018	Second Act	Peter Segal	

TV series

Year	Title	Director	Notes
1988–1989	Eurocops	Jean-Pierre Heizmann; Erwin Keusch	4 episodes
