= Joe Mullaney (actor) =

Scottish actor (born 1962)

- Born: 1 January 1962 (age 64); Glasgow, Scotland
- Occupation: Actor

Joe Mullaney (born 1 January 1962) is a Scottish actor, possibly best known for his role as Ronnie Witherspoon in the 1985 comedy-crime film Restless Natives.

Joe Mullaney was born in Glasgow in 1962. In 1980, while still attending John Bosco Secondary School, he became one of the presenters on Asking Around, a youth programme examining the questions, answers, pressures, problems and challenges that young Scots face in the 1980s. He was subsequently chosen to act, alongside his schoolmate, Paul Ferry, for a role in the BBC Scotland drama series Maggie, which aired on BBC Two from 1981 until 1982.

In 1985, he appeared in a starring role as Ronnie in the comedy film Restless Natives, directed by Michael Hoffman.

He is also known for his appearances in television shows during the 1980s, including Taggart, Take The High Road and Play for Today. His last credited acting appearance was in an episode of Doctor Finlay (1994). He currently works as a role play actor for medical students.

== Theatre ==
Year	Title	Role	Company	Director	Notes
1990	The Ship	Doeheid	The Ship's Company, Govan	Bill Bryden	play by Bill Bryden staged at harland and Wolff, Govan
