= Mahani Teave =

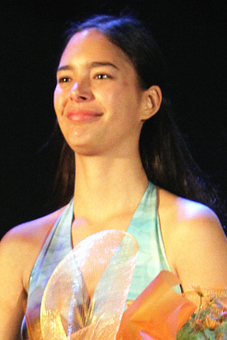
- Teave in 2012

Background information
- Born: Mahani Teave Williams; February 14, 1983 (age 43); Hawaii, U.S.
- Origin: Easter Island, Chile
- Genres: Classical
- Instrument: Piano

Mahani Teave (born 14 February 1983) is a classical pianist from Easter Island, Chile.

== Background ==
Teave was born on Hawaii, to a Rapa Nui father and an American mother. She attended the Austral University and studied music at the Cleveland Institute of Music and Hanns Eisler Music Academy (where she received the Konrad Adenauer Fellowship).

== Music ==
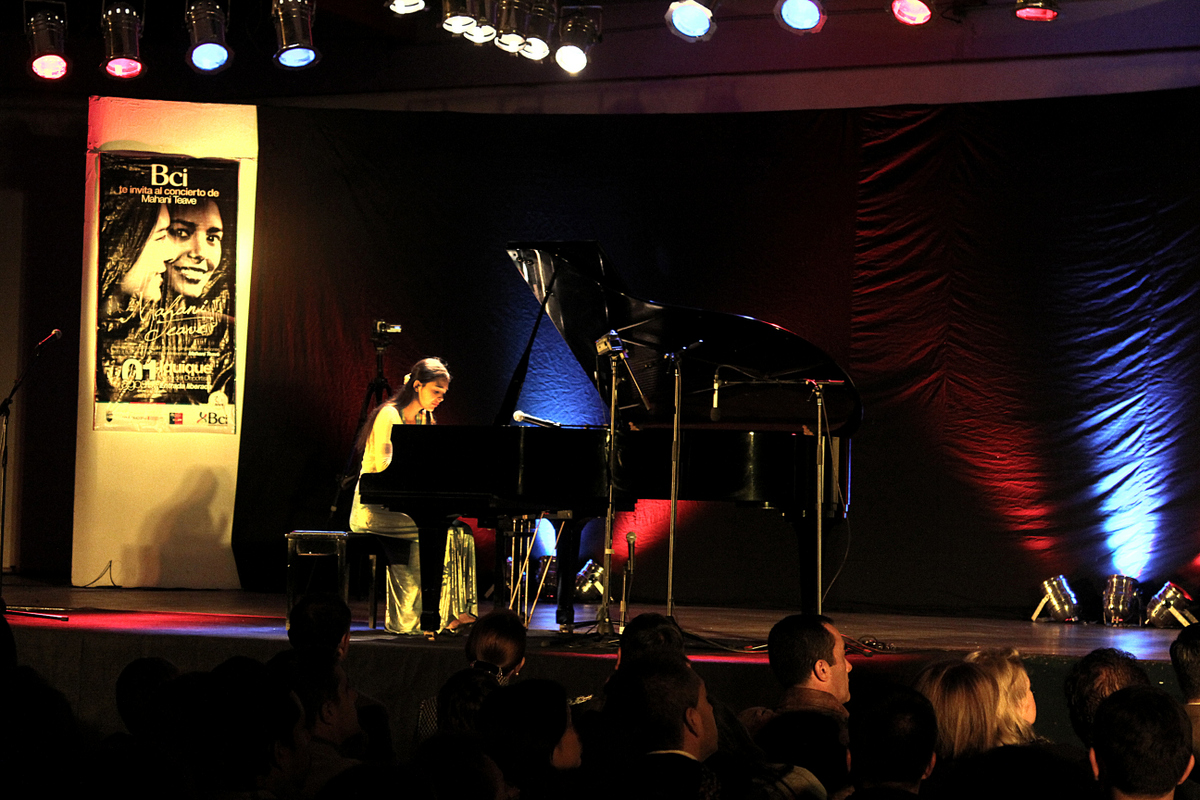
Teave during a presentation in Iquique, Chile, 2012.

Teave is considered Easter Island's only professional classical musician. She began playing Western classical music as a child, and, after her teacher left the island, Teave's family moved to mainland Chile so she could continue her musical education.

Teave has toured globally, including performances throughout Chile, Europe, and Asia. Her first performance in Canada was in 2014 at the Carleton University symposium celebrating Franz Liszt.

In 2012, Teave founded the Easter Island Music School, the island's first music school, teaching piano, cello, ukulele, and violin. She and her husband, Enrique Icka, manage the NGO Toki Rapa Nui, which helps sponsor the school.

In 2020, producer and filmmaker John Forsen released a documentary, Song of Rapa Nui, about Teave. The documentary focuses on her life journey through music as well as her contemporary work in conservation. In 2021, Teave released her debut album, Rapa Nui Odyssey. It includes pieces by Bach, Chopin, Handel, Liszt, Rachmaninov and Scriabin.

== Awards ==
In 2008, Teave's performance of Rachmaninov's Concerto No. 1 (with the Orquesta Sinfonica de Chile) was awarded the APES Prize for the best classical music performance in Chile.

Additional awards Teave has won include the Cleveland Institute of Music Concerto Competition (2004), the Claudio Arrau International Piano Competition (1999), and Merit Prize (arts) from Andrés Bello University (2012).

In 2012 Teave was selected to become a Steinway & Sons Artist. In 2016 she received the Advancement of Women Award from Scotiabank for her leadership and work on Easter Island promoting music.
