= Port Townsend Film Festival =

Annual film festival in Port Townsend, Washington, USA

Coordinates: 48°07′02″N 122°45′38″W

- Location: Port Townsend, Washington, U.S.
- Founded: 1999
- Founded by: Peter Simpson, Linda Yakush, and others
- Awards: Best Narrative, Best Documentary, Best Short
- Festival date: Annual, last full weekend in September
- Language: English
- Website: www.ptff.org

The Port Townsend Film Festival (PTFF) is an annual independent film festival held in Port Townsend, Washington. The festival was founded in 1999 and is organized by a 501(c)(3) nonprofit organization, focused on independent narrative, documentary, and short films. The event takes place over multiple days in late September within the city's downtown National Historic District on the Olympic Peninsula.

== History ==
The festival was conceived in 1999 by Rocky Friedman, Linda Yakush, Jim Ewing, and Jim Westall, and was modeled on the Telluride Film Festival. The inaugural festival was held on September 22, 2000.

Film historian Peter Simpson served as the festival's first executive director until 2009. Historically, the organization's primary fundraiser was an annual gala held in late February or early March.

== Programming ==
The festival has a submission period from January to April, selecting approximately 70 films. Submissions are evaluated by a rotating panel of approximately 34 reviewers. The festival has several juried awards including Best Narrative Feature, Best Documentary Feature, and Best Short Film.

== Noteworthy guests ==
Notable past special guests have included: Elliott Gould, Tony Curtis, Dyan Cannon, Debra Winger, Karen Allen, and Bruce Dern.

The following actors, directors, screenwriters, producers, critics and authors have made appearances at PTFF. This is by no means a complete listing:

- 2000
  - Actor Tony Curtis
  - Film Historian Robert Osborne
- 2001
  - Actress Eva Marie Saint
  - Actor Vincent Schiavelli
- 2002
  - Actress Patricia Neal
  - Screenwriter Stewart Stern (Rebel Without a Cause, The Ugly American)
- 2003
  - Actress Shirley Knight
  - Actor / Director Peter Fonda
  - Actress Verna Bloom
  - Film critic / Screenwriter Jay Cocks
  - Screenwriter Stewart Stern (Rebel Without a Cause)
  - Director Mark Decena (Dopamine (film))
  - Actor John Livingston (Dopamine (film))
- 2004
  - Actress Jane Powell
  - Former Child Actor Dickie Moore
  - Writer Tom Robbins
  - Director Zana Briski (Academy Award winner Born into Brothels)
  - Actor Tshewang Dendup (Travellers and Magicians)
- 2005
  - Actress Debra Winger
  - Actor / Director Arliss Howard
  - Mountaineer Jim Whittaker
- 2006
  - Actor Malcolm McDowell
  - Actress Greta Gerwig (LOL (2006 film))
  - Director Joe Swanberg (LOL (2006 film))
  - Producer Mike Kaplan (The Whales of August)
  - Filmmaker Linda Hattendorf (The Cats of Mirikitani)
- 2007
  - Actor Elliott Gould
  - Actress Melissa Leo
  - Director Charles Burnett
  - Poet Billy Collins
- 2008
  - Actress Piper Laurie
  - Writer / Producer Sherman Alexie
- 2009
  - Actress Cloris Leachman
  - Author Gail Buckley (Daughter of Lena Horne)
- 2010
  - Actress / Director Dyan Cannon
  - Radio Host Sedge Thomson
- 2011
  - Actor / Screenwriter / Director Buck Henry
  - Film Critic Moira MacDonald (The Seattle Times)
- 2012
  - Actor Bruce Dern
  - Actress / Singer Chely Wright
  - Composer / Keyboardist Wayne Horvitz
  - Radio Host Sedge Thomson
- 2013
  - Actress Karen Allen
  - Mountaineer Lou Whittaker
  - Film Critic Robert Horton
- 2014
  - Director / Writer John Sayles
  - Producer Maggie Renzi
  - Filmmaker Lynn Shelton
  - Director / Writer Ari Seth Cohen
  - Author Daniel James Brown
  - Film Critic Robert Horton
- 2015
  - Actor Beau Bridges
  - Actor Chris Cooper
  - Actress / Writer Marianne Leone Cooper
  - Director Ali Selim
  - Producer Jim Bigham Sweet Land
- 2016
  - Actor / Writer Andrew Perez
  - Actress / Director Karen Allen
  - Director / Composer Alexander Janko (Year by the Sea, My Big Fat Greek Wedding)
  - Director Charlie Soap (The Cherokee Word for Water)
- 2017
  - Director Morgan Neville (20 Feet from Stardom)
  - Director / Actress Karen Allen
  - Editor / Producer Doug Blush
  - Astronaut Trainee Alyssa Carlson
  - 'Bionic' Chef Eduardo Garcia
- 2018
  - Actor / Director / Activist Danny Glover
  - Director Charles Burnett
  - Director Jane Campion
  - Filmmaker Rayka Zehtabchi (Academy Award winner for Period. End of Sentence.)
  - Director Tedy Necula (Beside Me)
  - Director / Screenwriter Megan Griffiths
  - Human Rights Advocate Rais Bhuiyan
- 2019
  - Actor Stephen Tobolowsky
  - Writer Cheryl Strayed
  - Director / Actress Karen Allen
  - Director Michael Brown (film director)
  - Director Ward Serrill (The Heart of the Game)
  - Editor / Producer Doug Blush (Academy Award winner for 20 Feet from Stardom and The Elephant Whisperers)
  - Film Critic / Author Robert Horton (National Society of Film Critics, Scarecrow Project)
  - Film Critic Moira Macdonald (The Seattle Times)
  - Co-publisher & Co-editor Joseph Bednarik (Copper Canyon Press)
  - Educator / Film Producer Warren Etheredge
- 2020 Virtual Festival only
- 2021 Virtual Festival only
- 2022
  - Former Director & Programmer John Cooper (Sundance Film Festival)
  - Filmmakers Jared and Jerusha Hess (Napoleon Dynamite)
- 2023
  - Actress Lindsay Wagner
  - Actor and Stunt Performer Alex Kingi
- 2024
  - Director / Production Designer / Producer Catherine Hardwicke
  - Director & Cinematographer Louie Schwartzberg
  - Screenwriter Kristen Smith

== See also ==
- List of film festivals
