= PTFF =

PTFF may refer to:

- Pertrochanteric femur fracture
- Port Townsend Film Festival
