= Warren Etheredge =

Warren Etheredge is an educator. He lives in Seattle, Washington. Etheredge has tried writing 5 books and is the writer or director of over 40 plays staged in New York City.

Etheredge is the founder of The Warren Report, a Seattle-based film and arts screening organization. The Warren Report's guiding statement is: "Question what you see, consider what you do not, draw your own conclusions." Etheredge conducts on camera or during live interview settings. As of 2009, Etheredge had conducted more than 1,000 interviews with authors, film professionals and other cultural icons. Among his interviews: Sir Salman Rushdie, film director Oliver Stone, and author Calvin Trillin.

Etheredge is also co-founder of TheFilmSchool with actor/director Tom Skerritt, and screenwriters Stewart Stern, John Jacobsen and Rick Stevenson.

Etheredge served for six years as curator of the 1 Reel Film Festival (at Bumbershoot) in Seattle — the nation's most-attended celebration of short cinema, attracting over 25,000 film enthusiasts to Seattle every Labor Day weekend. He previously served in multiple positions with the Seattle International Film Festival. He is also a frequent public radio contributor to public radio.
