= Charlie Mole =

British-French Emmy nominated composer and songwriter

Charlie Mole is a British/French film and television score composer and songwriter.

Mole received a music scholarship to New College, Oxford, Oxford University, where he was a member of the band "Kudos Points" which provided the dance tracks for the Oxford University Film Foundation production of the Hugh Grant film Privileged. The band achieved a record deal whilst the members were still students.

Mole went on to sign a deal with Warner-Chappell as a songwriter for ten years before turning to film score composing. His songwriting collaborations include Chaka Khan, Kylie Minogue, Angie Stone, Lenny Kravitz, Ultra Naté, Lisa Stansfield and Girls Aloud. Never miss the water by Chaka Khan was featured in Friends and the Sopranos. His Hollywood composing career includes films like Othello with Lawrence Fishburn, an Ideal Husband with Julianne Moore and Kate Blanchett. As a Tv composer He was nominated for an Emmy for 4 years of the Tv series mr Selfridge.

== Filmography ==
Year	Title	Director	Notes
1989	Murder on Line One	Anders Palm	
1991	Murder Blues	Anders Palm	
1995	Othello	Oliver Parker	
1996	Never Miss the Water	Ralf Schmerberg	Music video for Chaka Khan feat. Me'Shell Ndegeocello
1999	An Ideal Husband	Oliver Parker	
2000	Paranoid	John Duigan	
2001	High Heels and Low Lifes	Mel Smith	
2002	The Importance of Being Earnest	Oliver Parker	
2004	The Divine Michelangelo	Tim Dunn and Stuart Elliott	TV movie
2004	Only Human	Dominic Harari and Teresa Pelegri	
2004	A Bear Named Winnie	John Kent Harrison	TV movie
2005	Guy X	Saul Metzstein	
2005	A Very Social Secretary	Jon Jones	TV movie
2005	ShakespeaRe-Told	Brian Percival; Mark Brozel; David Richards; Ed Fraiman	Miniseries
2006	Goose on the Loose	Nicholas Kendall	
2006	I Shouldn't Be Alive	Darlow Smithson Productions	TV series
2006	Fade to Black	Oliver Parker	
2006	The Secret Life of Mrs. Beeton	Jon Jones	TV movie
2007	Northanger Abbey	Jon Jones	TV movie
2007	The Lie of the Land	Molly Dineen	TV movie
2007	I Really Hate My Job	Oliver Parker	
2007	St Trinian's	Oliver Parker and Barnaby Thompson	
2009	St Trinian's 2: The Legend of Fritton's Gold	Oliver Parker and Barnaby Thompson	
2009	Dorian Gray	Oliver Parker	
2009	The Diary of Anne Frank	Jon Jones	Miniseries
2010	Garrow's Law	Tony Marchant	TV series
2012	Dead Mine	Steven Sheil	
2012	Father'hood	Louis Mole	Short film
2013–16	Mr Selfridge	Andrew Davies	TV series Emmy nominated
2013	North America		Miniseries
2016	Dad's Army	Oliver Parker	
2016	Viva Love	Julien Temple	Music video for ABC
2018	Swimming with Men	Oliver Parker	
2019	Lofty	Livia Vitoria	Video
2019	The Great Green Wall	Jared P. Scott	
2019–2021	The Mallorca Files	Dan Sefton	TV series
2022	Harry Potter 20th Anniversary: Return to Hogwarts	Casey Patterson, Joe Pearlman and Eran Creevy	TV special
2022	Whitstable Pearl	Øystein Karlsen and Julie Wassmer	TV series
