= Oxford University Film Foundation =

- Founded: 1981
- Website: ouff.org.uk

The Oxford University Filmmaking Foundation (OUFF) (formally the Oxford Film Foundation and the Oxford Broadcasting Association) is the principal funding body and provider of film equipment for the many independent films made by students at the University of Oxford. It was originally a charity registered as the Oxford Film Foundation. OUFF provides a platform for showcasing student-made films via termly screenings and hosts other film-related events throughout the year, including talks from industry professionals and filmmaking workshops.

== History and Alumni ==
The society was founded in 1981 by Michael Hoffman, Peter Schwabach and Rick Stevenson. Its first production was the 1982 feature film Privileged, starring Hugh Grant, James Wilby, Imogen Stubbs and Mark Williams. The film was directed by Michael Hoffman with John Schlesinger, produced by Rick Stevenson and Mark Bentley and with a score by Rachel Portman.

Some of the original founders of the Oxford Film Foundation, including Rick Stevenson, Michael Hoffman, Andy Paterson and Mark Bentley, went on to form the Oxford Film Company in 1984. The Oxford Film Company instituted Britain's first national screenwriting competition sponsored by Lloyds Bank and later produced a series of feature films, including Hilary and Jackie (1998), while the revived and renamed Oxford University Film Foundation continues to produce films with the students of Oxford University.

The Foundation produced The Third Sign in 1990, which went on to win the BP Film Expo, and the following year Greg Pak directed the noir, Lonely Street, produced by Matthew Rose and Andrew Lee.

OUFF now hosts their annual Short Film Festival. The Festival took different shapes across the years, starting more officially in 2022 after the Covid-19 Pandemic, accepting submissions from contemporary University of Oxford students and hosting a range of speakers such as Philippa Lowthorpe and Ben Willibond. In 2024, the Festival expanded to accepting entries from students and recent graduates across the UK, all Oxford alumni and NYU Tisch School film students.

== Previous Committees ==
Years active	Role, name and college
2025-26	President: Luisa Blacker (Jesus College)
2024-25	President: Charlie James (Christ Church)
2023-24	President: Monica Laudini (Keble College)
2022-23	President: Emma Earnshaw (Worcester College)
2021-22	President: Matt Coleclough (Worcester College)
2020-21	President: Bora Rex
2019-20	President: Flora Faulk (St. Peter's College)
2018-19	President: Oscar McNab
2017-18	President: Katie Carlson (University College)
2016-17	Co-President: James Riding (Magdalen College); Co-President: Mischa Andreski (Lady Margaret Hall)
2002	President: Andrew Rummer
1981-82	Founder: Rick Stevenson; Founder: Michael Hoffman; Founder: Andy Paterson; Founder: Mark Bentley
