= TheFilmSchool =

Coordinates: 47°37′19″N 122°20′55″W

- Type: Film, screenwriting
- Active: 2004–2019
- Location: Seattle, WA
- Campus: SIFF Film Center, Seattle Center

TheFilmSchool was an American non-profit film program that operated from 2003 to 2019.in Seattle in the US State of Washington. It focused on intensive training in screenwriting and directing.

== History ==
TheFilmSchool was a non-profit film program located in Seattle, Washington, that focused on intensive training in screenwriting and directing. It was founded in 2003 by Stewart Stern, John Jacobsen, Rick Stevenson, Warren Etheredge, and Tom Skerritt.

Classes were taught at the Museum of History & Industry and at the SIFF Film Center at the Seattle Center. TheFilmSchool launched its Great American Short Screenplay Contest in 2008, in partnership with the Seattle International Film Festival.

The FilmSchool closed in 2019. Christopher McQuarrie, Academy Award-winning screenwriter of The Usual Suspects, called TheFilmSchool "probably the best place in the world to study story."

== Academics ==
TheFilmSchool offered a non-degree screenwriting program. Classes were offered through three-week intenstive programs, taught over eighteen days. TheFilmSchool's curriculum focused on writing screenplays that emphasized character, structure, and understanding the principles of storytelling.

== Faculty ==
Founders Warren Etheredge, John Jacobsen, Tom Skerritt, Stewart Stern, and Rick Stevenson were faculty members.

== Alumni ==
- Scilla Andreen, filmmaker and costume designer
- Bert & Bertie, British Academy of Film and Television Arts Award winning film and television directors
- Nick Robinson, actor
