= Promised Land (1987 film) =

1987 American drama film by Michael Hoffman

- Theatrical release poster
- Directed by: Michael Hoffman
- Written by: Michael Hoffman
- Produced by: Rick Stevenson
- Starring: Kiefer Sutherland; Meg Ryan; Jason Gedrick; Tracy Pollan
- Cinematography: Alexander Gruszynski; Ueli Steiger
- Edited by: David Spiers
- Music by: James Newton Howard
- Distributed by: Vestron Pictures
- Release dates: September 1987 (Deauville); January 22, 1988 (U.S.)
- Running time: 102 minutes
- Country: United States
- Language: English
- Budget: $3 million
- Box office: $316,199 (US)

Promised Land is a 1987 American drama film written and directed by Michael Hoffman and starring Kiefer Sutherland and Meg Ryan. The film is set in Utah. It was the first film to be commissioned by the Sundance Film Festival.

== Plot ==
The film opens by following two American high school acquaintances, a few years after graduation. They are now suffering from deep anger and anguish, because they are less successful than they hoped to be.

David Hancock is the high school basketball star who gets a college athletic scholarship only to lose it to a better player. Unable to succeed in college academically, he returns to his hometown, becomes a police officer and slowly moves into a middle-class mediocrity with his cheerleader girlfriend, Mary Daley, who is in college and plans to major in the arts. Hancock is still stewing over no longer being the sports star and that his girlfriend is not only reluctant to marry him but may become more successful than he.

Danny Rivers is the academic "nerd" who was supposedly destined to be so successful that he earned the nickname "Senator". It was believed he would become a decent and just politician. He has returned home with his unrestrained, unpredictable, overbearing bride, Bev Sykes.

After a quick Christmas Eve reunion with his parents, Danny learns that his father is dying. He is unable to accept that while he left town with great expectations, he has returned a poor drifter. His desire to run from his problems again, however, prompts Bev to mock his manhood in front of some of his high school friends at a bar. The two decide to hold up a convenience store perhaps as a means for Danny to prove his manhood or because that is just what "Hollywood white trash" would do.

Just then, Hancock, unaware that Danny has returned to town, drives into the store's parking lot arguing with his girlfriend about the future of their relationship. Interrupting the robbery, he fatally shoots Danny and wounds Bev. Hancock then suffers something of an emotional breakdown. Danny and Hancock are shown to have little in common except that Danny once had a crush on Mary and perhaps a repressed crush on Hancock.

As other police officers and paramedics arrive on scene, Hancock drives with his girlfriend to an open field where he had previously shared, with his police partner, some of his frustrations. He screams to Mary how he feels he has been lied to while growing up.

Later Hancock has to personally inform Danny's father that he has killed his son.

== Cast ==
- Jason Gedrick as David Hancock
- Kiefer Sutherland as Danny Rivers
- Meg Ryan as Bev Sykes
- Tracy Pollan as Mary Daley
- Googy Gress as Baines
- Deborah Richter as Pammie
- Oscar Rowland as Mr. Rivers
- Sandra Seacat as Mrs. Rivers
- Jay Underwood as Circle K Clerk
- Herta Ware as Mrs. Higgins

== Production ==
Promised Land was filmed in Reno, Nevada and various locations in Utah, with the assistance of the Sundance Institute, and Robert Redford is credited as one of two executive producers. The Utah cities of Salt Lake, Midvale and Lehi are cited in the closing credits. Parts of the film were also shot in Wendover and Provo, Utah.

== Reception ==
Variety gave a critical review, writing the film is "drained of dramatic tension" and "fails to deliver". In the Los Angeles Times, Michael Wilmington wrote, "There’s something a little tentative and unsatisfying about the last few scenes but, forgetting them, Promised Land is almost a great American movie--in the anguished, poetically off-kilter tradition of Kazan's East of Eden, Malick's Days of Heaven and Badlands, Ray's They Live by Night." He concluded the film "is a film of lost chances, a story of people who try to go home again: why some of them can’t, and why some of them have stayed in spite of themselves. It’s a gently scary film, and its images echo long afterwards--the serpent on Bev’s back, the trapped dustiness of Danny’s old house, all the angels passing by . . . and the lonely pink car lost in love’s desert, rushing toward crushed dreams, whirling slowly in its mad and sandy spins of death."

The performance of Meg Ryan received acclaim, with Wilmington writing, "Ripping against the elegiac mood, she galvanizes the movie--whipping psychopathically between wounded tenderness and shrieking rage, raucous gaiety and mean, starved fury."
