= Some Girls (film) =

1988 film by Michael Hoffman

- Theatrical release poster
- Directed by: Michael Hoffman
- Written by: Rupert Walters
- Produced by: Rick Stevenson
- Starring: Patrick Dempsey
- Cinematography: Ueli Steiger
- Edited by: David Spiers
- Music by: James Newton Howard
- Production companies: Metro-Goldwyn-Mayer; The Oxford Film Company; Wildwood Enterprises
- Distributed by: MGM/UA Communications Co.
- Release date: September 9, 1988
- Running time: 94 minutes
- Country: United States
- Language: English
- Budget: $5 million
- Box office: $401,421

Some Girls is a 1988 American coming-of-age film comedy drama film directed by Michael Hoffman, and starring Patrick Dempsey, Jennifer Connelly, Sheila Kelley, Lila Kedrova and Andre Gregory.

== Plot ==
Michael goes to Quebec City, Canada, for Christmas at the request of his college girlfriend Gabriella, who left college in mid-semester. He arrives and is left waiting at the airport for hours. Gabriella (he calls her Gabi) eventually arrives to pick him up and explains that sometimes they just don't answer their phone. He brushes off his frustration because he's happy to see her.

When Michael arrives at the house and meets Gabi's family, he finds them rather eccentric. Her father is wearing only a towel, but spends much of his time nude. He eventually explains that he is writing a treatise on Blaise Pascal and cannot write while dressed. The mother is a fiercely religious and very quiet woman. A Catholic priest named Father Walter, a close friend of the family, is also present. Michael also meets Gabi's two energetic, beautiful, coquettish sisters Irenka and Simone, along with a handsome young handyman named Nick who is romantically involved with Irenka.

Although Michael enthusiastically attempts to join in the unusual habits of the family, he quickly learns that fitting in will be a challenge. The situation is complicated by the illness of Gabi's grandmother, the matriarch of the family, and the reason why Gabi left school in the first place. Michael commits the apparently unforgivable gaffe of expressing his condolences to Gabi's mother. As soon as they have time alone, Gabi announces that she no longer loves him. His attempts to change her mind seem somewhat successful, but her fickleness continues to thwart him. In the meantime, he is seductively teased first by Irenka, then by Simone, all with Gabi's apparent complicity. She appears to have a change of heart toward Michael, but then again decides that she doesn’t love him.

Gabi's grandmother, known only as "Granny," is in a care facility apparently suffering from senile dementia. Upon meeting Michael, she acts as if he is her long-dead husband, who was also named Michael. In an attempt to find her husband, she escapes from the hospital and goes to the country estate which they shared when they were first married. The girls, Nick, and Michael frantically rush to the estate, hoping Granny hasn't frozen in the cold. During their search, Michael gets lost in the woods and falls into a hole, unable to get out. He hears footsteps and finds it is Granny. She helps him out and they go back to the house, where Michael lights a fire and helps Granny out of her wet clothes. She then proceeds to talk to him as if he were her husband, and they form an unexpected bond.

Granny falls ill on the return trip, and despite Nick's valiant attempt to reach a hospital in time, she dies. After the funeral, and a tryst with Irenka, Michael makes a solitary visit to Granny's grave, where he encounters a mysterious young woman and confesses to her that he deeply loved Granny. Later he recognizes the young woman from a photograph as Granny in her youth, and realizes their meeting may have been supernatural. Michael returns home and he never sees Gabi or her family again, as she has decided not to return to college.

== Cast ==
- Patrick Dempsey as Michael
- Jennifer Connelly as Gabriella d'Arc
- Sheila Kelley as Irenka d'Arc
- Lance Edwards as Nick
- Lila Kedrova as Granny
- Florinda Bolkan as Mrs. d'Arc
- Andre Gregory as Mr. d'Arc
- Ashley Greenfield as Simone d'Arc
- Jean-Louis Millette as Father Walter
- Sanna Vraa as Young Granny

== Release ==
Some Girls was released in the United States on September 9, 1988. In the Philippines, the film was released as Happy Together 2 on October 3, 1991, connecting it to Patrick Dempsey's unrelated 1989 film Happy Together; free Happy Together calendar cards were handed out to dating moviegoers in cinema lobbies.
