= Michael Matheson (politician) =

Scottish politician (born 1970)

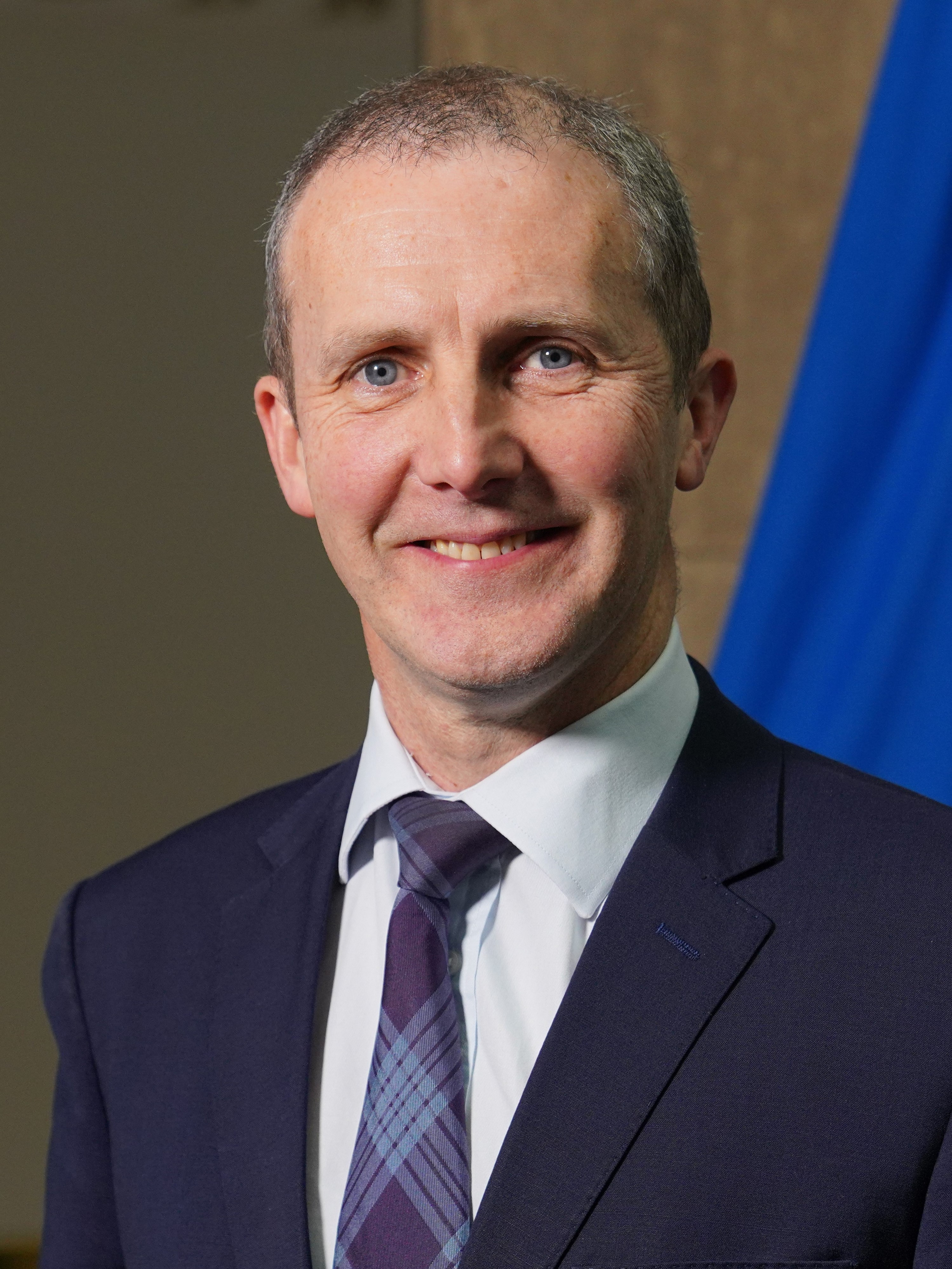
- Official portrait, 2023

Cabinet Secretary for NHS Recovery, Health and Social Care
- In office 29 March 2023 – 8 February 2024
- First Minister: Humza Yousaf
- Preceded by: Humza Yousaf
- Succeeded by: Neil Gray

Cabinet Secretary for Net Zero, Energy and Transport (Note: As Cabinet Secretary for Transport, Infrastructure and Connectivity from 2018 to 2021.)
- In office 26 June 2018 – 29 March 2023
- First Minister: Nicola Sturgeon
- Preceded by: Office established
- Succeeded by: Màiri McAllan

Cabinet Secretary for Justice
- In office 21 November 2014 – 26 June 2018
- First Minister: Nicola Sturgeon
- Preceded by: Kenny MacAskill
- Succeeded by: Humza Yousaf

Minister for Public Health
- In office 20 May 2011 – 21 November 2014
- First Minister: Alex Salmond
- Preceded by: Shona Robison
- Succeeded by: Maureen Watt

Member of the Scottish Parliament for Falkirk West
- In office 3 May 2007 – 9 April 2026
- Preceded by: Dennis Canavan
- Succeeded by: Gary Bouse

Member of the Scottish Parliament for Central Scotland
- In office 6 May 1999 – 3 May 2007

Personal details
- Born: Michael Stephen Matheson; 8 September 1970 (age 56) Glasgow, Scotland
- Party: Scottish National Party
- Spouse: Susan Totten (m. 2005)
- Children: 3
- Education: Queen Margaret University; The Open University
- Profession: Occupational therapist

Michael Stephen Matheson (born 8 September 1970) is a Scottish politician who was a Scottish National Party Member of the Scottish Parliament (MSP) from 1999 to 2026, first representing the Central Scotland region and, from 2007, the Falkirk West constituency. Matheson previously served in the Scottish government as Cabinet Secretary for NHS Recovery, Health and Social Care from 2023 to 2024, Cabinet Secretary for Net Zero, Energy and Transport from 2018 to 2023, and Cabinet Secretary for Justice from 2014 to 2018.

A graduate of the Queen Margaret University and The Open University, Matheson worked as an occupational therapist in local government, before his election to Holyrood in the 1999 Scottish Parliament election. He served successively as the SNP's shadow deputy minister for justice and rural development and shadow minister for culture and sport. Matheson ran unsuccessfully, twice, for the Falkirk West constituency, however, remained as an additional member for the Central Scotland region until the 2007 election, when he won the Falkirk West seat. He sat on the SNP's backbenches from 2007 until 2011, when he was appointed Minister for Public Health in First Minister Alex Salmond's second government, supporting Nicola Sturgeon, and later Alex Neil, in their role as Health Secretary.

Following the appointment of Sturgeon as First Minister, she promoted Matheson to the Scottish Cabinet as the Justice Secretary. In a 2018 Scottish Cabinet reshuffle, he was appointed to the new post of Cabinet Secretary of Transport, Infrastructure and Connectivity. The office was retitled as the Cabinet Secretary for Net Zero, Energy and Transport in Sturgeon's third administration, as part of her government's effort to tackle the climate emergency.

Following Sturgeon's resignation and the appointment of Humza Yousaf as First Minister, Matheson was appointed Cabinet Secretary for NHS Recovery, Health and Social Care in 2023. Following a scandal surrounding the misuse of a Parliamentary iPad while on a family holiday, which incurred £11,000 in roaming charges, Matheson resigned as Health Secretary in February 2024. Matheson was subsequently suspended from Holyrood for 27 days and had his salary withdrawn for 54 days, the heaviest sanction ever awarded to an MSP.

== Early life ==
=== Birth and education ===
Michael Stephen Matheson was born on 8 September 1970 in Glasgow. He was raised in the Toryglen district and educated at John Bosco Secondary School in the city. He then attended Queen Margaret University where he graduated with a Bachelor of Science degree in occupational therapy in 1991. He later went on to graduate from The Open University with both a Bachelor of Arts degree and a Postgraduate diploma in applied social sciences. Following graduation, he worked as a community occupational therapist for eight years, until his election to the Scottish Parliament.

=== Early political career ===
Matheson worked for Highland Regional Council, Central Regional Council and Stirling Council. He first stood as a parliamentary candidate for the SNP in the 1997 general election, standing for the newly created Hamilton North and Bellshill constituency.

== Political career ==
=== Election to Holyrood ===
In the 1999 Scottish parliamentary election, Matheson contested the Falkirk West constituency, which was won by the independent Dennis Canavan, who had been rejected by the Labour Party. However, Matheson was ranked third on the SNP's regional list for Central Scotland and was one of the five SNP candidates elected in the region.

=== SNP in opposition: 1999–2007 ===
He served as Shadow Deputy Minister for Justice from May 1999 until September 2004, and as Shadow Deputy Minister for Rural Development from October 2001 until September 2004. Matheson also served on the Equal Opportunities Committee, the Justice and Home Affairs Committee, and the Justice 1 Committee between 1999 and 2004. During the 2000 SNP deputy leadership election, he was the campaign manager for Roseanna Cunningham.

He contested the Falkirk West constituency again at the 2003 Scottish parliamentary election, and although it was won again by Denis Canavan, Matheson was re-elected as one of three SNP MSPs for Central Scotland. In the parliament's second session he served on the Justice 1 Committee, the Enterprise and Culture Committee and the Justice 2 Committee. From September 2004 until September 2006, he was Shadow Minister for Culture and Sport.

=== Backbencher: 2007–2011 ===
Matheson won the constituency in the 2007 election with a majority of 776 votes over Labour, after Canavan stepped down. (Canavan later endorsed Matheson for re-election in 2011). Matheson was a member of the Health and Sport Committee from June 2007 until March 2011 and was the Deputy Convener of the European and External Relations Committee from March 2009 until July 2010. He was also a member of the End of Life Assistance (Scotland) Bill Committee.

Before becoming a Minister, Matheson was actively involved in a number of Parliamentary Cross-Party Groups, including those on Malawi, Sport, Alzheimer's disease, International development, Russia and Taiwan.

At the 2011 Scottish parliamentary election, he retained his seat with an increased majority of 5,745 votes over Labour.

=== Salmond Administration: 2011–2014 ===
He was appointed as Minister for Public Health after the SNP landslide in 2011, a position he held until the November 2014 reshuffle which saw him promoted to cabinet rank as Cabinet Secretary for Justice.

=== Justice Secretary: 2014–2018 ===
Following the appointment of Nicola Sturgeon as First Minister of Scotland, she appointed Matheson as the Cabinet Secretary for Justice on 21 November 2014. In Sturgeon's 2016 cabinet reshuffle, he remained in the post of Justice Secretary. Matheson was supported by the Minister for Community Safety, Paul Wheelhouse, and later, Annabelle Ewing.

==== Crime and policing ====
Matheson supported efforts to merge British Transport Police with Police Scotland. He also proposed for the criminal justice system in Scotland to move from prison towards rehabilitation in a bid to reduce re-offending rates.

==== Criminal misconduct within police authorities ====
The justice system in Scotland was claimed to have been in a "state of chaos" amid criminal misconduct of high-ranking officials in Police Scotland and the Scottish Police Authority. The scandal erupted following the absence leave of chief constable of Police Scotland Phil Gormley, who was accused of bullying. He resigned and was succeeded by his deputy Iain Livingston. The chief executive and chair of governing body the Scottish Police Authority (SPA) also resigned. In 2018, a BBC Scotland investigation raised concerns that "bad practices and unlawful behaviour in the previous eight regional forces had continued" after Police Scotland was established in 2013.

Matheson was accused of being "invisible" and "closing down questions" amid allegations of gross misconduct and leader of the Scottish Conservatives, Ruth Davidson, raised the possibility he may have acted unlawful. Scottish Labour also claimed Matheson was unlawful after ignoring recommendations by the SPA not to allow Gormley to return from his suspension.

=== Transport Secretary: 2018–2023 ===
In a cabinet reshuffle in 2018, he was shifted to Cabinet Secretary for Transport, Infrastructure and Connectivity. In 2021, his portfolio changed, with infrastructure and connectivity being replaced with net zero and energy, becoming Cabinet Secretary for Net Zero, Energy and Transport.

=== Health Secretary: 2023–2024 ===
Matheson endorsed Humza Yousaf in the 2023 Scottish National Party leadership election. Following Yousaf's election as party leader and appointment as First Minister, Matheson was appointed Cabinet Secretary for NHS Recovery, Health and Social Care in his government.

==== iPad scandal and resignation ====
In November 2023, Matheson was revealed to have incurred £10,935 in roaming charges after taking a Parliamentary iPad on a family holiday to Morocco. Matheson claimed that he incurred the charges while completing constituency work, and that he had not been aware that he needed to replace the SIM card in the iPad to switch over to the Scottish Parliament's current mobile contract. Matheson attempted to claim £3,000 of the bill from his expenses budget, with the Scottish Parliament paying the remainder out of its own budget. First Minister Humza Yousaf described this as a "legitimate parliamentary expense". Matheson's bill was described as being more than the total of all MSPs' mobile phone, business line, tablet and staff phone bill expenses claimed in 2022/23 combined: the total for all phone-related expenses in that year was £9,507.

It was subsequently revealed that Matheson had been emailed by Parliamentary officials in February 2022, warning him of the need to update the SIM cards in his devices almost a year in advance of his holiday. Following this, Matheson agreed to personally pay back the full cost of the data roaming bill. On 16 November, Matheson admitted to the Scottish Parliament that the charges had been incurred owing to his sons using the iPad to watch football matches, and that he would refer himself to the Scottish Parliamentary Corporate Body for investigation, but would not stand down as health secretary. On 19 November, Humza Yousaf re-iterated his confidence in Matheson, describing him as a man of integrity and honesty, and insisted that he had not been misled by the health secretary over the bill.

On 8 February 2024, ahead of the publication of an investigation into the incident by the Scottish Parliament Corporate Body, Matheson resigned as Health Secretary. In his resignation letter to First Minister Humza Yousaf, Matheson said that he had not yet received the Corporate Body's report, but that; "it is in the best interest of myself and the government for me to now step down to ensure this does not become a distraction to taking forward the government's agenda." The Scottish Parliament Corporate Body's report, published on 14 March, upheld three complaints against Matheson and concluded that he had breached sections 7.3 and 7.4 of the MSPs' Code of Conduct. The report was passed to the Standards, Procedures and Public Appointments Committee.

The committee reported on 23 May 2024, recommending a 27-day ban from the Scottish Parliament, as well as Matheson's being withheld his salary as an MSP for 54 days. This was described as the toughest sanction ever recommended for an MSP. The First Minister, John Swinney, declared that he would not support the committee's recommended sanction, describing Matheson as a "friend and colleague" who had "made mistakes", and casting doubt on the integrity of the committee's process: describing the process as "prejudiced", Swinney claimed that Conservative MSP Annie Wells should have removed herself from the committee due to previous comments about Matheson's conduct. Michael Matheson also said the issue had "become highly politicised", which he claimed had "compromised the fairness of the process". He described the proposed sanctions as "excessive" and "unfair", but said that he would accept the Scottish Parliament's decision.

Swinney's support for Matheson was described as "incredible and indefensible" by the Scottish Conservatives leader Douglas Ross, and "unbelievable and embarrassing" by the Scottish Labour leader Anas Sarwar. The Scottish Conservatives declared their intention to table a non-binding motion calling for Matheson to resign as an MSP. SNP Deputy First Minister Kate Forbes subsequently introduced an amendment that re-iterated Swinney's complaints about the investigation into Matheson, but did not attempt to change the sanction. The SNP's position on the sanctions appeared to change throughout the day of the vote on the committee's recommendations, and despite indications that it would back the proposed sanction, the party ultimately abstained on the vote on the committee's recommendations: the SNP amendment was backed by 68 MSPs, with 56 against, and the amended motion sanctioning Matheson passed with the backing of 64 MSPs.

=== Backbencher: 2024–present ===
Matheson continued to serve as an SNP backbencher following his resignation as Health Secretary, and returned to work at Holyrood on 10 September 2024. In November 2024, he submitted an application to stand again as the SNP candidate for Falkirk West in the next Scottish Parliament election, to the disquiet of his constituency party. In March 2025, Matheson announced that he would not stand for re-election and would stand down at the 2026 Holyrood election.

==== Candidate selection controversy in Falkirk West ====
In May 2025, The Herald reported that Matheson had agreed to step down after an intervention by John Swinney, on the condition that he passed internal party vetting and that SNP activist Toni Giugliano was blocked from taking his place: Guigliano had stood as SNP candidate for Falkirk in the 2024 United Kingdom general election, and blamed the scale of the SNP's defeat in part on the party's support for Matheson, saying: "An MSP found to have breached rules on parliamentary expenses must never again be protected - quite the opposite, they must be removed from office." Guigliano passed party vetting to stand as a Holyrood candidate for Falkirk West on 12 March 2025, but was suspended and removed from the candidate list because of a bullying complaint first made in August 2024, which his supporters claimed was closed with no action taken but re-opened after he passed vetting. An SNP spokesperson described the allegations as "nonsense".

In July 2025, the SNP's Conduct Appeals Committee found that the process against Guigliano was "procedurally unfair", and that key evidence had been withheld by Alex Kerr, the SNP's National Secretary. SNP activists in Falkirk West demanded a re-run of the selection contest and Alex Kerr's resignation. A local activist told The Herald, "Toni was winning this contest by a country mile, but Swinney didn't want someone who pushed too hard on independence." An SNP spokesperson said: "Understandably, we don’t comment on confidential internal processes."

== Personal life ==
Matheson has been married to Susan Totten since 2005. They have two sons, James and Daniel, and a stepson, Sean O’Donnell.

== Notes ==
Scottish Parliament
New parliament	Member of the Scottish Parliament for Central Scotland; 1999–2007	Succeeded by Jamie Hepburn
Preceded by Dennis Canavan	Member of the Scottish Parliament for Falkirk West; 2007–2026	Succeeded by Gary Bouse
Political offices
Preceded by Shona Robison	Minister for Public Health; 2011–2014	Succeeded by Maureen Watt
Preceded by Kenny MacAskill	Cabinet Secretary for Justice; 2014–2018	Succeeded by Humza Yousaf
Preceded by Office established	Cabinet Secretary for Net Zero, Energy and Transport; 2018-2023	Succeeded by Màiri McAllan
Preceded by Humza Yousaf	Cabinet Secretary for NHS Recovery, Health and Social Care; 2023–2024	Succeeded by Neil Gray
