= Expiration Date (film) =

- DVD cover
- Directed by: Rick Stevenson
- Written by: Hamish Gunn; Rick Stevenson
- Produced by: John Forsen
- Starring: Robert A. Guthrie; Jill Bennett; Sascha Knopf; Dee Wallace; Ned Romero; Nakotah LaRance; Misty Upham
- Cinematography: Bruce Worrall
- Edited by: Mark Fulton
- Music by: Tim Boyle; Bryon Rickeron; B.C. Smith
- Production company: Roadkill Productions LLC
- Release date: 2006
- Running time: 94 minutes
- Country: United States
- Language: English

Expiration Date is a 2006 independent black comedy film directed by Rick Stevenson.

== Plot summary ==
The story is told by a Native American elderly man to a Native American boy who wants to give up dancing and leave the reservation by bus. The story he tells is about a Native American man named Charlie Silvercloud III who thinks that he will be hit by a milk truck on his 25th birthday, like his father and grandfather before him due to a curse. His birthday is two weeks away. Charlie has a checklist of things he wants to do before his two weeks are up, but because he does not have long to live and has no way to do anything extreme, his list is somewhat more practical than most "bucket" lists. His checklist includes canceling his cellphone contract, watering the plants, and returning library books. His mother tries to prevent the curse from killing him by mapping the milk truck route and is trying to stop Charlie from going outside during certain times just in case he might be killed earlier than expected. While looking for a casket to buy for his assumed death, he meets Bessie Smith who is looking for casket for her mother. Bessie owns a dog named Roadkill because he is able to play dead so convincingly that crowds gather when he plays dead. Bessie and Charlie start seeing each other, but Charlie cannot decide if he should continue the relationship because of his impending death. Things become more complicated when Charlie finds out that Bessie is being stalked by a man who drives a milk truck for the local dairy.

== Production ==
The film was shot in Seattle and has Seattle actors. The film has important Seattle locations that Kim Voynar of Cinematical said was like a walking tour of the city. Rick Stevenson said that the film was revised more than 17 times in 7 years. Rick and the writer Haming Gunn came up with the idea from talking to people that had fathers and grandfathers that died at 35 because of a heart attack. Rick said that he chose Robert Guthrie for the lead role because he has a good sense of humor and is talented when it comes to black comedy. The Seattle dairy Smith Brothers agreed to supply everything related to the milk trucks because they thought that the plot sounded funny.

== Release ==
The film debuted at the Palm Springs Film Festival. The DVD was released on January 27, 2009. The special features have a making of documentary, deleted scenes, director's commentary, the script, stills, cast and crew bios, the trailer, and a documentary called Family Dancing.

== Reception ==
Review aggregator Rotten Tomatoes reported that 83% of critics gave positive feedback, based on 6 reviews.

Sean Axmaker of Seattle PI said that the video filmography and pacing isn't very good at times, but that he still likes the film because of the romance, offbeat humor, and gags.

A Los Angeles CityBeat review said that the director's effort shows a bit too much and that he wasn't able to pull it off. Justin Chang of Variety said that the film doesn't amount to much because it is too stringy and disjointed.

== Awards ==
- Sedona Film Festival (2006)
- Spiritual Cinema Festival-At-Sea (2006)
- American Indian Film Festival for Best Film (2006)
- Bluegrass Independent Film Festival for Best Film (2006)
- Method Fest Independent Film Festival for Best Film (2006)
- Ojai Film Festival for Best Film (2006)
- Omaha Film Festival for Best Film (2006)
- Rhode Island International Film Festival for Best Film (2006)
- Durango Film Festival for Best Film (2007)
