= The Kevin and Sadie series =

Series of young adult novels related to the Northern Ireland conflict

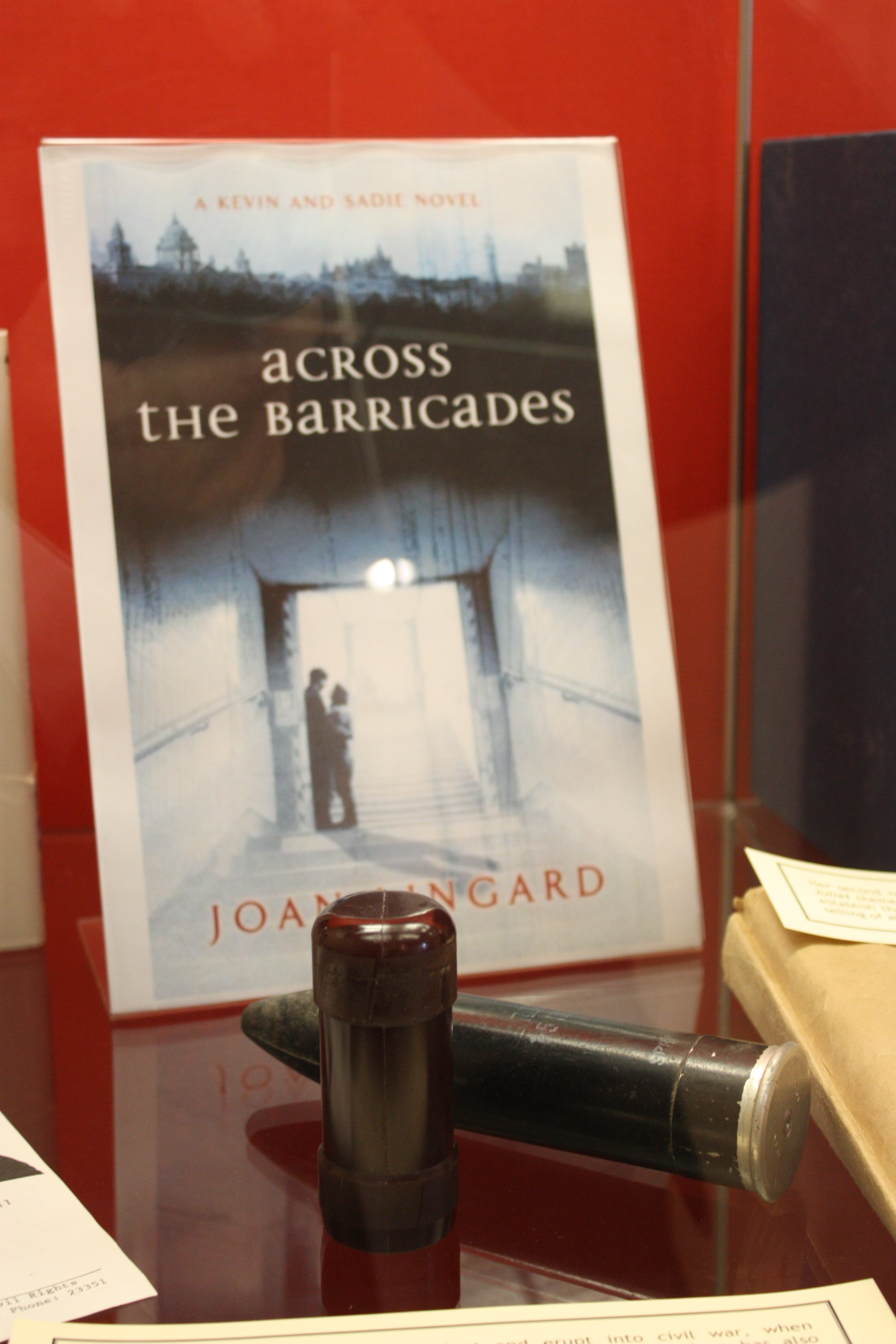
Cover of the second book, Crossroads of Change Exhibition, Linen Hall Library, Belfast, August 2010

The Kevin and Sadie series is a 1970s set of young adult novels by Scottish novelist Joan Lingard. The books, set in Northern Ireland and England against the backdrop of the Northern Ireland conflict, deal with a young couple; Sadie Jackson, who is from the Ulster Protestant community, and Kevin McCoy, who is from the Irish Catholic community. This couple finds love despite the various physical and psychological barriers in their society.

== Overview ==
Lingard decided to write the first book prior to the eruption of violence in Northern Ireland in late 1969 after hearing a Protestant family friend tell a joke that she deemed to be sectarian. Despite concern from her literary agent that publishers would reject the material on account of its coverage of political and religious strife, the manuscript for the first book, The Twelfth Day of July, attracted interest from Penguin Books and was published in 1970 to a mixture of positive reviews and disapproval of the book's subject matter. The book dealt with the beginning of the romance between the main characters at the beginning of The Troubles. The book was Lingard's first novel aimed at younger readers and her first commercial success.

The sequel, Across the Barricades, sees the couple reunite 3 years later.

The remaining books deal with the couple's developing romance, despite disapproval from their families, and their eventual move to England and their secret marriage. Lingard considered writing a sixth book, in which the couple returned to a post-conflict Belfast, but judged that divisions in the city still existed.

As of July 2010, the books had sold 1.3 million copies worldwide and had been translated into several languages.

== Books ==
- The Twelfth Day of July (1970)
- Across the Barricades (1972)
- Into Exile (1973)
- A Proper Place (1975)
- Hostages to Fortune (1976)
