= The Rack (1956 film) =

1956 film by Arnold Laven

- Theatrical release poster
- Directed by: Arnold Laven
- Screenplay by: Stewart Stern
- Based on: The Rack; 1955 teleplay on The U.S. Steel Hour by Rod Serling
- Produced by: Arthur M. Loew Jr.
- Starring: Paul Newman; Wendell Corey; Walter Pidgeon; Edmond O'Brien; Anne Francis; Lee Marvin
- Cinematography: Paul C. Vogel
- Edited by: Harold F. Kress; Marshall Neilan Jr.
- Music by: Adolph Deutsch
- Production company: Metro-Goldwyn-Mayer
- Distributed by: Metro-Goldwyn-Mayer
- Release date: November 2, 1956
- Running time: 100 minutes
- Country: United States
- Language: English
- Budget: $779,000
- Box office: $765,000

The Rack is a 1956 American war drama film, based on a television play written by Rod Serling. It was directed by Arnold Laven and stars Paul Newman, Wendell Corey, Anne Francis, Lee Marvin and Walter Pidgeon.

After two years in a North Korean prison camp, an American officer returns home, only to be charged with collaboration by his own side. He is forced to defend his actions in court.

== Plot ==
Having survived two years in a Korean prisoner-of-war camp, Captain Edward W. Hall Jr. returns home to a US Army post in San Francisco. His father, a retired colonel, is glad to have his son back despite grieving over the death of his other son, Pete.

Pete's widow, Aggie Hall, confides to her friend Caroline it is difficult to be around her brother-in-law without painful reminders of her lost husband. A welcome-home party is held for Capt. Hall, surprising Colonel Dudley Smith, a friend of Ed, Sr. He finds out that Capt. Hall's father is unaware that his son is about to be tried in a court-martial for collaboration with the enemy. Hall's father asks his son if the charges are true, and receives a stark, simple, reply: "yes, I did". Ed Sr. cruelly challenges his son: "Why didn't you just die?".

Major Sam Moulton prosecutes the case. He calls eyewitnesses who testify that at the POW camp in the winter of 1951, Hall made speeches and signed documents on the enemy's behalf. A fellow prisoner and much-decorated officer, Capt. John Miller, reveals scars received from enemy inflicted torture, but claims he never conceded to his captors anything but his name, rank and serial number. In unguarded comments on the stand Miller calls Hall a coward.

Capt. Hall has his sister-in-law's support, but his father initially refuses even to attend the trial. Hall is disconsolate and wishes to plead guilty. But his lawyer, Lt. Col. Frank Wasnick, persuades him to take the witness stand and explain his actions.

In stark detail, Capt. Hall discloses the torture he underwent. This includes how he was ordered to bury other soldiers, dead or alive; how he carried a wounded man for four days so he wouldn't collapse and be placed in a grave; solitary confinement for months at a time, denied light and company and forced to live in his own excrement. Facing repeated demands to read propaganda statements, Hall relented but wrote one himself, using language that attempted to mock the enemy's purpose. Hall experienced a breaking point when the enemy delivered a letter from his father, revealing his brother Pete's death.

Hall's father, who finally attends the trial, is devastated by his son's testimony about his breaking point. He forgives his son, but the official judgment is less kind. Hall is found guilty of treason and the film closes with Hall's contrition on the witness stand.

== Cast ==
- Paul Newman as Capt. Edward W. Hall Jr.
- Wendell Corey as Maj. Sam Moulton
- Walter Pidgeon as Col. Edward W. Hall Sr.
- Edmond O'Brien as Lt. Col. Frank Wasnick
- Anne Francis as Aggie Hall
- Lee Marvin as Capt. John R. Miller
- Cloris Leachman as Caroline
- Robert Burton as Col. Ira Hansen
- Robert F. Simon as Law Officer
- Trevor Bardette as Court President
- Adam Williams as Sgt. Otto Pahnke
- James Best as Millard Chilson Cassidy
- Fay Roope as Col. Dudley Smith
- Barry Atwater as Maj. Byron Phillips

== Production ==
The film is based on an episode of The United States Steel Hour written by Serling and broadcast on April 12, 1955. Director Arnold Laven and screenwriter Stewart Stern had been pushing for Newman to be cast in the film after seeing him in other productions, but MGM's chief of production Dore Schary was opposed. Leslie Nielsen and other actors were given screen tests and Glenn Ford was offered the role. Ford declined, saying that he would never want to play a "rat fink role." Other actors declined for the same reason. Ultimately Ernest Lehman convinced Schary to cast Newman in the part.

== Reception ==
Bosley Crowther praised Newman's "brilliantly detailed performance" and the supporting actors in a New York Times review, but he criticized the film as "dramatically thin."

According to MGM records, the film earned $365,000 in the U.S. and $400,000 in other markets, totaling an overall loss of $422,000.
