= Michael Matheson iPad scandal =

Political scandal in Scotland

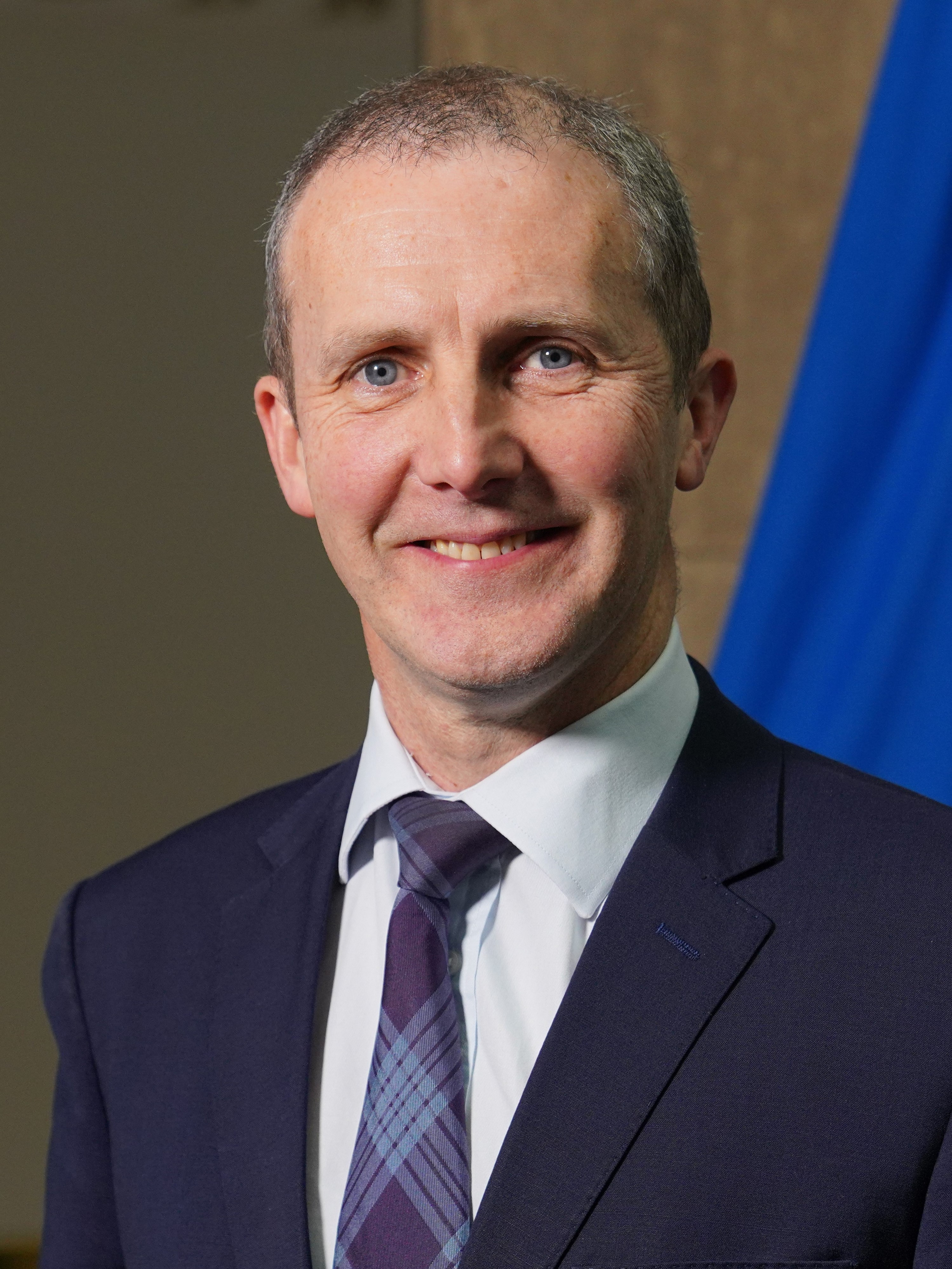
Michael Matheson, March 2023

The Michael Matheson iPad scandal, commonly known as iPadgate, emerged as a significant controversy in Scottish politics in late 2023. Michael Matheson, then serving as Cabinet Secretary for NHS Recovery, Health and Social Care in the government of Humza Yousaf, was revealed to have incurred nearly £11,000 in roaming charges after taking a Scottish Parliament iPad on a family holiday to Morocco. Matheson initially attempted to claim the charges as a parliamentary expense, but later admitted that the iPad had been used by his sons to stream football matches, and agreed to personally pay back the full cost of the data roaming bill. Following an investigation by the Scottish Parliament Corporate Body, Matheson resigned as Health Secretary in February 2024. Matheson was subsequently banned from Holyrood for 27 days and had his salary withdrawn for 54 days, the heaviest sanction ever given to an MSP.

== Background and incident ==
Michael Matheson, serving as Scotland's Health Secretary, incurred an £10,935 data roaming bill on his Parliamentary iPad during a family holiday in Morocco over Christmas 2022. This became public knowledge in November 2023. Matheson claimed that he incurred the charges while completing constituency work, and that he had not been aware that he needed to replace the SIM card in the iPad to switch over to the Scottish Parliament's current mobile contract. Matheson attempted to claim £3,000 of the bill from his expenses budget, with the Scottish Parliament paying the remainder out of its own budget. Matheson's bill was described as being more than the total of all MSPs' mobile phone, business line, tablet and staff phone bill expenses claimed in 2022/23 combined: the total for all phone-related expenses in that year was £9,507. First Minister Humza Yousaf described this as a "legitimate parliamentary expense".

It was subsequently revealed that Matheson had been emailed by Parliamentary officials in February 2022, warning him of the need to update the SIM cards in his devices almost a year in advance of his holiday. Following this, Matheson agreed to personally pay back the full cost of the data roaming bill. On 16 November, Matheson admitted to the Scottish Parliament that the charges had been incurred owing to his sons using the iPad to watch football matches, and that he would refer himself to the Scottish Parliamentary Corporate Body for investigation, but would not stand down as health secretary.

== Investigation and findings ==
=== Corporate Body investigation ===
An investigation by the Scottish Parliamentary Corporate Body (SPCB) found that Matheson had breached multiple sections of the MSP code of conduct, particularly those related to the misuse of parliamentary expenses and facilities. On 8 February 2024, ahead of the publication of the investigation into the incident, Matheson resigned as Health Secretary. In his resignation letter to First Minister Humza Yousaf, Matheson said that he had not yet received the Corporate Body's report, but that; "it is in the best interest of myself and the government for me to now step down to ensure this does not become a distraction to taking forward the government's agenda." The SPCB's report, published on 14 March, upheld three complaints against Matheson and concluded that he had breached sections 7.3 and 7.4 of the MSPs' Code of Conduct.

=== Standards Committee report ===
The report was passed to the Scottish Parliament's Standards, Procedures and Public Appointments Committee, which reported on 23 May 2024, recommending a suspension for 27 parliamentary sitting days and a withdrawal of Matheson's salary for 54 days. This marked one of the most severe punishments ever imposed by the Scottish Parliament.

The First Minister John Swinney, who succeeded Humza Yousaf on 8 May 2024, said that the SNP would not support the proposed sanctions against Matheson, and cast doubt on the integrity of the committee's process: describing the process as "prejudiced", Swinney claimed that Conservative MSP Annie Wells should have removed herself from the committee due to previous comments about Matheson's conduct. Michael Matheson also said the issue had "become highly politicised", which he claimed had "compromised the fairness of the process". He described the proposed sanctions as "excessive" and "unfair", but said that he would accept the Scottish Parliament's decision.

== Political and public reaction ==
The scandal had far-reaching political repercussions. Opposition parties, including the Scottish Conservatives and Scottish Labour, were particularly vocal in their criticism. They accused Matheson of deceit and called for his resignation. The affair also drew criticism towards First Minister Humza Yousaf for his initial support of Matheson and perceived failure to take swift action.

Yousaf supported Matheson throughout the scandal. This had lasting repercussions for the SNP and its leadership. Critics argue that Yousaf's support for Matheson, despite the evidence of misconduct, weakened his position and raised questions about the party's internal controls and ethical standards. The affair has fuelled broader concerns about transparency and accountability within the SNP, highlighting the need for more stringent oversight and reform. However, supporters of Yousaf and Matheson pointed out that the political climate often amplifies mistakes and that both politicians took steps to rectify the situation. They argued that the focus should remain on their broader contributions to public service and governance.

Stephen Kerr, a Scottish Conservative MSP, described the incident as a "devastating and damning" episode. Jackie Baillie, the Scottish Labour Deputy Leader, criticized Yousaf's judgment and leadership, suggesting the scandal indicated broader issues of accountability within the SNP. However, some supporters of Matheson argued that the political backlash was disproportionate and that Matheson’s intentions were not malicious but rather a mistake that he sought to rectify by repaying the costs.

On 30 May 2024, the Cabinet Secretary for Net Zero and Energy, Màiri McAllan, insisted that the Matheson scandal was a "political bubble issue... which I now think needs to be put to bed". A poll by Savanta for The Scotsman found that 65 per cent of Scots believed that Matheson should resign as an MSP.

== Consequences ==
=== Resignation of Matheson ===
Matheson resigned as Health Secretary in February 2024, stating he did not want the scandal to overshadow the government's work. His resignation came before the formal conclusion of the inquiry into his conduct. In his resignation letter to Humza Yousaf, Matheson expressed his desire to ensure the government’s agenda was not distracted by the controversy. Yousaf accepted the resignation "with sadness" but acknowledged that the affair had been mishandled. He admitted that Matheson should have addressed the situation more appropriately from the outset but defended him as a man of integrity who had served the public for many years.

=== John Swinney continues to support Matheson ===
Humza Yousaf resigned as First Minister in April 2024 following a crisis in his government. His successor as First Minister, John Swinney, continued to support Matheson, describing him as a "friend and colleague" who had "made mistakes", and describing the committee investigation into Matheson as prejudiced and its proposed sanctions as "excessive" and "unfair".

Swinney's position was described as "incredible and indefensible" by the Scottish Conservatives leader Douglas Ross, and "unbelievable and embarrassing" by the Scottish Labour leader Anas Sarwar. The Scottish Conservatives declared their intention to table a non-binding motion calling for Matheson to resign as an MSP.

=== Parliamentary vote on Matheson's suspension ===
The Scottish Parliament voted on the committee's recommendations on 29 May 2024: SNP Deputy First Minister Kate Forbes introduced an amendment that re-iterated the party's complaints about the investigation into Matheson, but did not attempt to change the sanction. The SNP's position on the sanctions appeared to change throughout the day of the vote on the committee's recommendations, and despite indications that it would back the proposed sanction, the party ultimately abstained on the vote on the committee's recommendations: the SNP amendment was backed by 68 MSPs, with 56 against, and the amended motion sanctioning Matheson passed with the backing of 64 MSPs.

After the completion of his suspension, Matheson returned to work at Holyrood on 10 September 2024.

== Aftermath ==
=== 2024 United Kingdom general election ===
In the general election of July 2024, the SNP lost 39 seats, reducing it to the second-largest party in Scotland in the Westminster Parliament. Defeated SNP candidate in Falkirk, Toni Giugliano, blamed the scale of the defeat in part on the SNP's support for Matheson: "An MSP found to have breached rules on parliamentary expenses must never again be protected - quite the opposite, they must be removed from office."

=== Candidate selection controversy in Falkirk West ===
Matheson applied to stand again as the SNP candidate for Falkirk West in the 2026 Scottish Parliament election, but in March 2025 announced that he would stand down as an MSP in 2026. In May 2025, The Herald reported that Matheson had agreed to step down after an intervention by John Swinney, on the condition that he passed internal party vetting and that Toni Giugliano was blocked from taking his place: Giugliano passed party vetting to stand as a Holyrood candidate for Falkirk West on 12 March 2025, but was suspended and removed from the candidate list because of a bullying complaint first made in August 2024, which his supporters claimed was closed with no action taken but re-opened after he passed vetting. An SNP spokesperson described the allegations as "nonsense".

In July 2025, the SNP's Conduct Appeals Committee found that the process against Giugliano was "procedurally unfair", and that key evidence had been withheld by Alex Kerr, the SNP's National Secretary. SNP activists in Falkirk West demanded a re-run of the selection contest and Alex Kerr's resignation. A local activist told The Herald, "Toni was winning this contest by a country mile, but Swinney didn't want someone who pushed too hard on independence." An SNP spokesperson said: "Understandably, we don’t comment on confidential internal processes."
