= Vincent Friell =

Scottish actor (1960–2024)

- Born: 7 January 1960; Glasgow, Scotland
- Died: 14 April 2024 (aged 64)
- Occupation: Actor

Vincent Friell (7 January 1960 – 14 April 2024) was a Scottish actor whose most memorable role was that of Will Bryce in the Scottish crime comedy film Restless Natives (1985).

== Life and career ==
Vincent Friell was born on 7 January 1960 in Glasgow.

Friell's other film appearances included roles in other Scottish films such as Trainspotting (1996) and The Angels' Share (2012). He also appeared in a variety of television shows including Rab C. Nesbitt, Taggart, Still Game and Being Victor.

Friell died on 14 April 2024 at the age of 64.

== Theatre ==
Year	Title	Role	Company	Director	Notes
1987	The Jungle Book	Kaa	Brunton Theatre Company, Musselburgh	Charles Nowosielski	adaptation by Stephen MacDonald
1987	The Knicht o the Riddils	Prince Alasdair	Brunton Theatre Company, Musselburgh	Charles Nowosielski	play by David Purves
