= Joan Lingard =

Northern Irish writer (1932–2022)

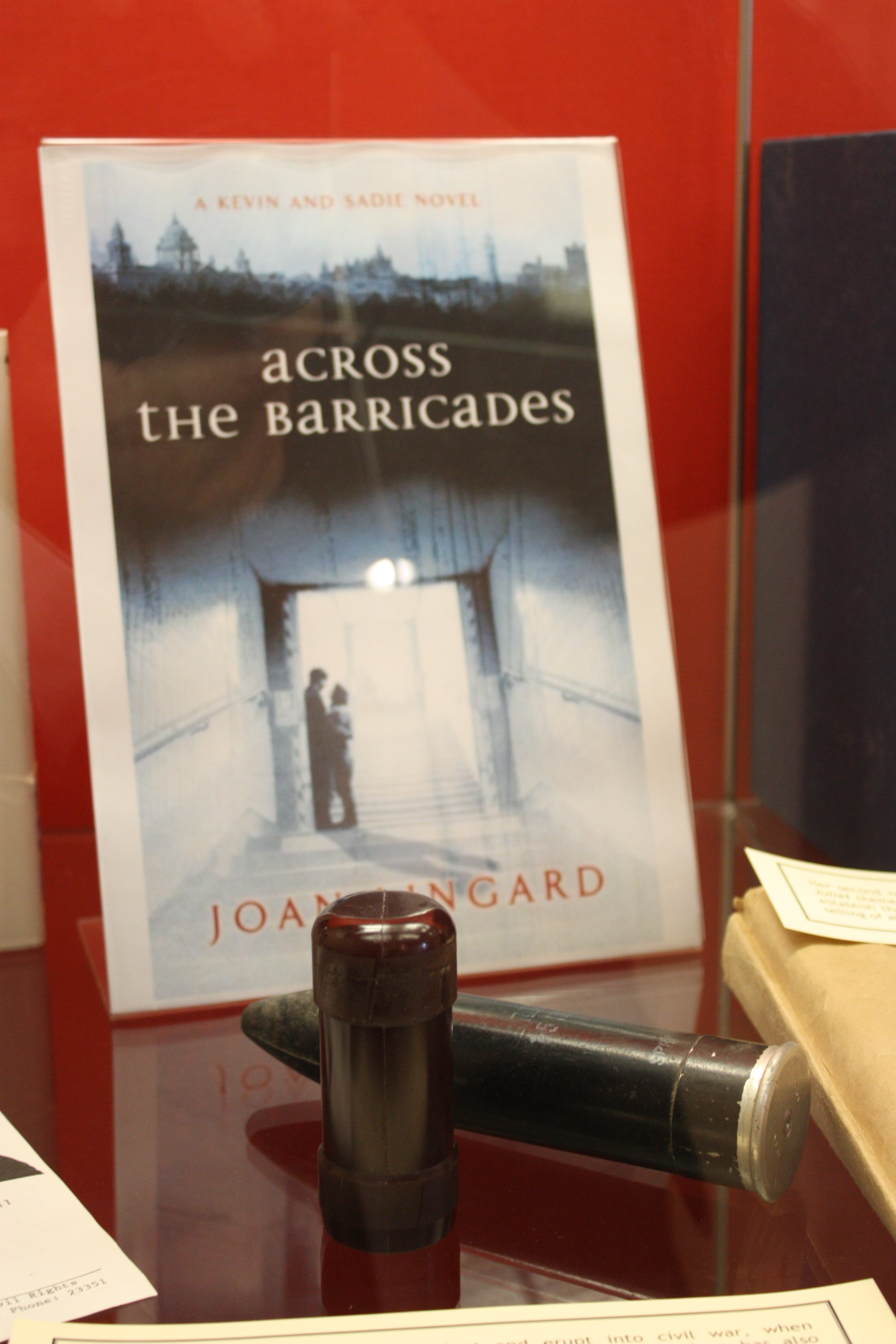
Crossroads of Change Exhibition, Linen Hall Library, Belfast, August 2010

Joan Amelia Lingard MBE (8 April 1932 – 12 July 2022) was a Northern Irish writer. She was born in Edinburgh but brought up in Belfast, Northern Ireland. She is known for the young adult-aimed Kevin and Sadie series, which sold over one million copies and has been translated into several languages. Across the Barricades, part of the Kevin and Sadie series, is one of the best known novels about the Troubles in Northern Ireland.

== Career ==
Lingard wrote novels for both adults and children. Her first work, Liam's Daughter, was an adult-orientated novel published in 1963. Her first children's novel was The Twelfth Day of July (the first of the five Kevin and Sadie books) in 1970.

She received the Buxtehuder Bulle award in 1986 for Across the Barricades. Tug of War has also received great success: shortlisted for the Carnegie Medal 1989, the Federation of Children's Book Group Award 1989, runner-up in the Lancashire Children's Book Club of the year 1990 and shortlisted for the Sheffield Book Award. In 1998, her book Tom and the Tree House won the Scottish Arts Council Children's Book Award. Her last novel was Trouble on Cable Street.

Lingard's writing has been called "alive" and "intelligent, warm" and "solid and interesting."

On occasions Lingard encountered hostility on account of the subject matter of the Kevin and Sadie series.

== Personal life and honours ==
Lingard's parents were Englishman Henry Lingard, who was in the Royal Navy, and Scottish woman Elizabeth (née Beattie). Lingard was born in a taxi in Edinburgh's Royal Mile but grew up in Holland Gardens in the Bloomfield area of Belfast, where she lived until she was 18. Her mother, who died when Lingard was 16, was a Christian Scientist; Lingard later gave up this faith. She attended Strandtown Primary School and was then awarded a scholarship into Bloomfield Collegiate School. A family member considered that Lingard "always had a sense of not being either Catholic or Protestant, and being in some senses an observer of all these debates that were going on". She received the MBE in 1998 for services to children's literature.

Lingard had three daughters (Kersten, Bridget and Jenny) from a short-lived first marriage and five grandchildren. She trained as a teacher and often visited schools in her later years. After leaving Northern Ireland, she spent the rest of her life in Edinburgh with architect Martin Birkhans (married 1972), her Latvian-Canadian husband whose wartime family experiences inspired two of her novels.

Lingard died from COVID-19 at a care home in Edinburgh, on 12 July 2022, aged 90.

== Works ==
=== Adult novels ===
- Liam's Daughter (1963)
- The Prevailing Wind (1960)
- The Tide Comes In (1966)
- The Headmaster (1967)
- A Sort of Freedom (1968)
- The Lord On Our Side (1970)
- The Second Flowering of Emily Mountjoy (1979)
- Greenyards (1981)
- Sisters by Rite (1984)
- Reasonable Doubts (1986)
- The Women's House (1989)
- After Colette (1993)
- Dreams of Love and Modest Glory (1995)
- The Kiss (2002)
- Encarnita's Journey (2005)
- After You've Gone (2007)

=== Children's novels ===
- The Twelfth Day of July (1970)
- Frying as Usual (1971)
- Across the Barricades (1972)
- The Clearance (1973) source material for the BBC TV series, Maggie
- Into Exile (1973)
- A Proper Place (1974)
- The Resettling (1975) source material for the BBC TV series, Maggie
- The Pilgrimage (1976) source material for the BBC TV series, Maggie
- Hostages to Fortune (1976)
- The Reunion (1977) source material for the BBC TV series, Maggie
- Snake Among the Sunflowers (1977)
- The Gooseberry (1978) aka Odd Girl Out (2000)
- The File on Fraulein Berg (1980)
- Strangers in the House (1981)
- The Winter Visitor (1983)
- The Freedom Machine (1986)
- The Guilty Party (1987)
- Rags and Riches (1988)
- Tug of War (1989)
- Glad Rags (1990)
- Can You Find Sammy the Hamster? (1990)
- Between Two Worlds (1991)
- Morag and the Lamb (1991)
- Secrets and Surprises (1991)
- Hands Off Our School (1992)
- Night Fires (1993)
- Clever Clive and Loopy Lucy (1993)
- Slow Flo and Boomerang Bill (1994)
- Sulky Suzy and Jittery Jack (1995)
- Lizzie's Leaving (1995)
- Dark Shadows (1998)
- Tom and the Tree House (1998)
- A Secret Place (1998)
- The Egg Thieves (1999)
- Natasha's Will (2000)
- River Eyes (2000)
- Me and My Shadow (2001)
- Tortoise Trouble (2002)
- Tell the Moon to Come Out (2003)
- The Sign of the Black Dagger (2005)
- The Eleventh Orphan (2006)
- What to Do About Holly (2009)
- What Holly Did (2012)
- Trouble on Cable Street (2014)
