= Rick Stevenson =

American writer, director and producer

Rick Stevenson is a writer, director, and producer from Seattle, Washington.

== Early life ==
Stevenson holds a DPhil from Oxford University, a master's degree from the London School of Economics and a bachelor's degree in history from Whitman College in Washington State.

== Career ==
In 2001, he founded “The 5000 Days Project” a global organization dedicated to understanding the journey of becoming an adult and developing emotional intelligence in youth. As of 2019, Stevenson has conducted over 5500 in-depth, personal interviews with kids.

Some of Stevenson's films include: Privileged (1982) starring Hugh Grant, Restless Natives (1985) starring Ned Beatty, Promised Land (1987) starring Meg Ryan and Kiefer Sutherland, Some Girls (1988) starring Patrick Dempsey, Jennifer Connelly and Andre Gregory, and Crooked Smiles starring Jennifer Jason-Leigh, Noah Wylie, Juliette Lewis and Peter Coyote. In 2006, his film Expiration Date won both Audience and Jury Award for Best Film at the Omaha Film Festival, the Best Drama Film award at the 2007 Byron Bay International Film Festival and took Best Film honors at the American Indian Film Festival. Stevenson has directed many programs for television, including ED for NBC, and he has been awarded for his work as a director of television commercials.

In 2004, Stevenson founded TheFilmSchool with Tom Skerritt and Stewart Stern. In 2019, he released his audiobook “21 Things You Forgot About Being A Kid”.

== Personal life ==
Stevenson has lived his whole life in Richmond Beach, Washington, except for five years in England and four in Vancouver, for school. He is married with four children.

== Select filmography ==
- Privileged (1982)
- Restless Natives (1985)
- Promised Land (1987)
- Some Girls (1988)
- Magic in the Water (1995)
- Question of Privilege (1999)
- The Dinosaur Hunter (2000)
- Anthrax (2001)
- Expiration Date (2006)
- 5000 Days Project (ongoing)
