= John Forsen =

American film producer

- Born: October 21, 1958 (age 67); Pasadena, California
- Occupations: Film director and producer

John Forsen (born October 21, 1958) is an American documentary filmmaker, producer, director, writer, and editor based in Seattle, Washington. A 15-time Emmy Award-winning filmmaker, Forsen is recognized for creating documentary films that explore the history, culture, arts, and natural heritage of the Pacific Northwest. Over a career spanning more than three decades, his work has been broadcast on PBS and other public television stations and has been used in educational programs throughout Washington State.

Forsen is the founder of Fidget Films and serves as president and co-founder of the nonprofit organization Documentaries Seattle, which produces educational documentary films for public television, museums, libraries, and schools.

== Early life and career ==
Forsen grew up in Washington State and developed an early interest in filmmaking and storytelling. He began his professional career producing television programs, commercials, and documentaries before founding MagicHour Films, where he spent more than fifteen years producing regional and national programming.

He later founded Fidget Films, an independent production company specializing in documentary filmmaking, historical storytelling, and arts programming.

Throughout his career, Forsen has served as producer, director, writer, editor, and cinematographer on projects ranging from public television documentaries to commercial productions, earning recognition for combining historical research with cinematic storytelling. Family He is married to Filmmaker Gayle L. Podrabsky. His father was Dr. Harold K. Forsen

=== Documentary filmmaking ===
Forsen’s documentaries frequently focus on significant people, places, artists, and events that have shaped the Pacific Northwest.

Among his best-known productions are:

- Pilchuck: A Dance with Fire, documenting the internationally influential Pilchuck Glass School.
- Violin Masters: Two Gentlemen of Cremona, exploring the craft of contemporary Italian violin makers.
- Song of Rapa Nui, examining the history and culture of Easter Island.
- Being Centered, a documentary following internationally recognized glass artist Dante Marioni.
- Numerous historical and cultural documentaries produced for PBS and educational audiences.

His work has received multiple Northwest Emmy Awards for documentary production, directing, writing, and editing.

==== Seattle: A History in Short Stories ====
In 2026, Forsen completed Seattle: A History in Short Stories, a three-part documentary series examining Seattle’s history through more than ninety short, standalone films.

Rather than presenting a traditional chronological documentary, the series combines brief stories about notable individuals, neighborhoods, industries, innovations, and historic events that collectively tell the story of Seattle’s development.

Produced through Documentaries Seattle, the series aired on KBTC PBS, Northwest Public Broadcasting, Seattle Channel, King County TV, and other community television stations. Individual stories have also been incorporated into Washington State educational resources, allowing teachers to use them as classroom materials aligned with state history curriculum.

==== Documentaries Seattle ====
In 2022, Forsen and filmmaker Gayle Podrabsky co-founded Documentaries Seattle, a nonprofit educational organization dedicated to preserving and sharing the history, culture, and natural heritage of the Pacific Northwest through documentary filmmaking.

The organization’s mission is to create historically accurate films and make them freely available to schools, public television stations, nonprofit organizations, museums, libraries, and the public. The organization emphasizes preserving Washington’s collective memory while making regional history accessible to future generations.

=== Current work ===
Forsen is currently leading the development of Washington: A History in Short Stories, a statewide documentary project modeled after the Seattle series. The project is intended to document the people, places, and events that have shaped Washington State through a collection of short educational films designed for both classroom instruction and public television broadcast.

The project is being developed in collaboration with historians, educators, tribal representatives, museums, and cultural organizations throughout Washington.

== Style and influence ==
Forsen’s documentaries emphasize concise storytelling, historical accuracy, extensive archival research, and cinematic production values. Much of his recent work has focused on producing short-form documentaries that can be viewed individually or combined into longer educational series.

His films are intended to preserve regional history while making it accessible to broad public audiences through public television and free educational distribution.

== Awards and recognition ==
Forsen has received fourteen Northwest EMMY Awards during his career, recognizing excellence in documentary filmmaking, directing, writing, editing, and production. These are from both the Northwest and New York EMMY regions.

His work has also been recognized through national public television broadcasts (PBS), educational partnerships, and collaborations with museums, historians, artists, and nonprofit organizations throughout the Pacific Northwest.

Short list of Awards

- 14 Northwest and NY EMMY Awards
- 13 EMMY nominations
- American Indian Film Festival: Best Film
- Cannes recognition

== Selected filmography ==
- Pilchuck: A Dance with Fire
- Violin Masters: Two Gentlemen of Cremona
- Song of Rapa Nui
- Lino Tagliapietra, The Making of a Maestro
- Dante Marioni, Being Centered
- Seattle: A History in Short Stories (2026)
- Washington: A History in Short Stories (in production)

== Filmography ==
- 2026 Dante Marinoi, Being Centered (Feature documentary)(Producer/Director)
- 2025-2026 Seattle, A History in Short Stories (3-part documentary series)(Co-Producer/Director) Episode 2 2025 Emmy nominated
- 2022 Executive Order 9066 (short op-ed) (Producer/Director) 2023 Emmy nominated
- 2020 Song of Rapa Nui (documentary) (Producer/Director) 2021 Emmy nominated
- 2020 Lino Tagliapietrea: The Making of a Maestro (documentary) (Producer/Director)
- 2019 Tip Toland, Empathy in Clay (documentary short) (Producer) 2020 Emmy nominated
- 2015 Pilchuck, A Dance with Fire (documentary) (Producer/Director) winner 2016 Emmy "Best Historical" Documentary
- 2015 "Z. Z. Wei, At One in the Landscape, an artists journey" (documentary) (Producer/Director)
- 2013 Transcendence, A Meeting of Greats. Miro Quartet plays Schubert (Producer/Director) 2014 Emmy winner best Director
- 2012 All-Star Orchestra, 8) part 1 hour PBS special (TV series) (Producer) winner 2013 Emmy "Live Event coverage, other than sports" NY
- 2011 Julie Speidel, Perfect Edge (short) (producer/director)
- 2010 Violin Masters: Two Gentlemen of Cremona (documentary) (producer/director) winner 2012 Emmy "Best Historical" Documentary
- 2009 Given to Walk (short) (producer)
- 2009 AYP Seattle's Forgotten World's Fair (TV documentary) (producer/director) (Emmy nomination)
- 2009 Homage (video) (Emmy, best Director)
- 2008 Live from the Artists Den (TV series) (producer/director- 1 episode)
- 2007 Paul Marioni: Artist (short) (producer/director)
- 2006 Seattle Symphony from Benaroya Hall (TV movie) (producer/director) 200 Emmy winner, best live event coverage
- 2006 Expiration Date (film) (Producer)
- 1997 History of Glacier Bay (Documentary for the National Park Service) (Producer)
- 1987 50 Years of skiing in the NW. (TV Documentary) (Producer/Director)
