= Privileged (film) =

- Theatrical release poster
- Directed by: Michael Hoffman
- Written by: Michael Hoffman; David Woollcombe; Rupert Walters
- Produced by: Rick Stevenson; Andy Paterson
- Starring: Robert Woolley; Diana Katis; Hugh Grant; Mark Williams; James Wilby
- Music by: Rachel Portman
- Distributed by: ITC
- Release date: 1982
- Running time: 96 minutes
- Country: United Kingdom
- Language: English

Privileged is a 1982 film notable for being the first theatrical release from the Oxford Film Foundation and the screen debut of Hugh Grant, Imogen Stubbs, Mark Williams, and James Wilby. Directed by Michael Hoffman with John Schlesinger, produced by Rick Stevenson (as Richard Stevenson) and Andy Paterson, the film is about a group of Oxford student partygoers, with elements of a whodunit.

The classical score is by Rachel Portman in her film debut at the age of 22, and the film also uses dance tracks by Oxford student band "Kudos Points" whose members included Charlie Mole (who went on to compose film scores in his own right).

The screenplay includes a play within a play as several of the characters are vying for a role in a student production of The Duchess of Malfi.

== Cast ==
- Robert Woolley as Edward
- Diana Katis as Anne
- Hugh Grant as Lord Adrian (credited as Hughie Grant)
- Victoria Studd as Lucy
- James Wilby as Jamie
- Simon Shackleton as Justin
- Imogen Stubbs as Imogen
- Mark Williams as Wilf
- Neville Watchurst as Julian
- Michael Hoffman as Alan
- Jenny Waldman as Waitress
- Ted Coleman as Barman
- Stefan Bednarczyk as Pianist (credited as Stefan Bednarcyzk)
