= Maggie (British TV series) =

Scottish drama series

- Genre: Drama
- Written by: Joan Lingard (adaptation)
- Directed by: Renny Rye; Michael Kerrigan
- Starring: Kirsty Miller
- Opening theme: "Maggie" written and performed by BA Robertson
- Country of origin: Scotland
- Original language: English
- No. of series: 2
- No. of episodes: 18

Production
- Executive producer: Anna Home
- Producer: Kenny McBain
- Running time: 30 minutes
- Production company: BBC Scotland

Original release
- Network: BBC Two
- Release: 17 February 1981 – 3 May 1982

Maggie is a Scottish television drama series produced by BBC Scotland which aired on BBC Two between 1981 and 1982. It was based on a quartet of books written by Joan Lingard during the 1970s – The Clearance, The Resettling, The Pilgrimage and The Reunion.

== Synopsis ==
Set in the city of Glasgow, the series is centred on 17-year-old Maggie McKinley (played by Kirsty Miller) from a council flat in a high-rise tower block whose family has been uprooted for generations, beginning with the Highland Clearances. Maggie experiences the tribulations of adolescence as she aspires to further her education at university, a career and an independent life, while also struggling to better her family's economic situation. Maggie's parents (Michael Sheard and Mary Riggans) expect her to take a secure working-class job, get married and "settle down".

Maggie sorts through her feelings for both local boy Mike (Joe Mullaney), and James (Ian Michie), a comfortably middle-class Edinburgh student. Much of the series also centres on Maggie's relationship with her feisty octogenarian grandmother (Jean Faulds) who lives in rural Inverness-shire, and who frequently acts as an important confidante to her granddaughter. The two series followed Maggie's progress, ending as she faces a crossroads in her life – whether to go to university or work for the family business. The theme song "Maggie" was written and performed by pop singer BA Robertson.

== Cast ==
- Kirsty Miller as Maggie McKinley
- Michael Sheard as Mr. Andrew McKinley
- Mary Riggans as Mrs. Nan McKinley
- Anne Berry as Jean McKinley
- Paul Ferry as Sandy McKinley
- Ian Michie as James Fraser
- Ron Paterson as Uncle Tam Campbell
- Ann Scott-Jones as Aunt Jessie Campbell
- Joe Mullaney as Mike Bruce
- Jane Garven as Catriona Fraser
- Dee Hepburn as Isobel
- Alison Groves as Janet Scott
- Benny Young as Colin Scott
- Margo Croan as Mrs. Elizabeth Fraser
- David Ashton as Mr. Peter Fraser
- Patrick Doyle as Alexander Smith
- Robin Cameron as Neil Grant
- Maureen Beattie as Cathy Bruce
- Jean Faulds as Granny Margaret McKinley
- James Copeland as Grandfather Fraser

== Episodes ==
=== Series 1: 1981 ===
Original air date	Episode number
17 February 1981	1
19 February 1981	2
24 February 1981	3
26 February 1981	4
3 March 1981	5
5 March 1981	6
10 March 1981	7
12 March 1981	8
17 March 1981	9

=== Series 2: 1982 ===
Original air date	Episode number
8 March 1982	10
15 March 1982	11
22 March 1982	12
29 March 1982	13
5 April 1982	14
12 April 1982	15
19 April 1982	16
26 April 1982	17
3 May 1982	18
