= Restless Natives =

1985 adventure comedy film by Michael Hoffman

- Film Poster
- Directed by: Michael Hoffman
- Written by: Ninian Dunnett
- Produced by: Rick Stevenson; Andy Paterson; Mark Bentley
- Starring: Vincent Friell; Joe Mullaney; Ned Beatty; Bernard Hill
- Cinematography: Oliver Stapleton
- Music by: Big Country
- Production companies: Thorn EMI Screen Entertainment; Oxford Film Foundation
- Distributed by: Thorn EMI Screen Entertainment
- Release date: June 1985
- Running time: 90 minutes
- Country: Scotland
- Language: English
- Budget: £1.2 million
- Box office: £300,000

Restless Natives is a 1985 Scottish adventure comedy film, directed by Michael Hoffman.

It received mixed reviews but was popular in Scotland and earned a reputation as a cult film. It has been turned into a musical.

== Plot ==
The story follows the adventures of two Scottish youths from the Wester Hailes district of Edinburgh, played by Vincent Friell and Joe Mullaney, who, in rebellion to their drab lives in urban Scotland in the mid-1980s, become modern highwaymen. Donning masks of a clown and a wolf-man and riding a Suzuki GP 125 motorbike, they waylay and hold up with a toy gun tourist coaches in the Highlands, but in the process becoming a tourist attraction themselves. Having acquired substantial amounts of money, they proceed to become modern-day Rob Roys, doling it out to the poor of their city by scattering it on bike rides through its streets, attracting international media attention and pursuit by the police.

In the end, after escaping the police, they try to hold up another coach, but it is not driven by a woman as it first seems but by a man (Ned Beatty) who has been pursuing them. The police catch up and they are arrested, but DCI Baird (Robert Urquhart) shows a telegram from the Secretary of State for Scotland and releases them because they have increased Scottish tourism by 15%. He instead organises a fake crash to explain the highwaymen's demise, with their real identities still unknown, and send them away to live abroad.

== Cast ==
- Vincent Friell
- Joe Mullaney
- Ned Beatty
- Bernard Hill
- Robert Urquhart
- Terri Lally
- Mel Smith
- Iain McColl
- Bryan Forbes
- Nanette Newman

== Production ==
The screenplay won a film script writing competition held by Lloyds Bank before it was optioned for production. Writer Ninian Dunnett was a journalist and his script won over 200 other entries.

“I didn’t even know what I was writing, really,” said Dunnett later. “It was just little scribbles and notes here and there. And those were busy times in the north-east of England; the miner’s strike was looming, and I was out there interviewing people whose livelihoods were on the line, and who mostly weren’t too keen on journalists. But I picked up this leaflet in my bank advertising a screenwriting competition – the Lloyds Bank National Screenwriting Competition 1984 – and I decided to enter."

The movie was produced by the Oxford Film Foundation formed in 1980 by friends at Oriel College including Americans Rick Stevenson and director Michael Hoffman. It made a film called Privilege and wanted to make another one so held a competition.

Finance came from EMI. Filming took seven weeks. Bryan Forbes and Nanette Newman make a cameo as a married couple held up at the beginning of the film.

== Music score ==
The soundtrack features music from the band Big Country. This music was not released on an album but was combined into two lengthy tracks, each featuring various pieces of music and clips of actors from the film's audio, which appeared on limited edition formats of two Big Country 12" singles. The soundtrack was released on CD for the first time on the 1998 Big Country collection Restless Natives & Rarities, where it is presented as a single 35-minute track.

== Themes ==
Restless Natives—as suggested by its title—has underlying themes beyond its superficial presentation as a light social comedy film. It was produced at a time of high unemployment in the United Kingdom, with Scotland being particularly affected by post-industrial economic blight, and being governed from London by a Conservative party that the Scottish electorate had rejected in the recent 1983 United Kingdom general election. The main storyline's premise reflected the frustration of mid-1980s Scottish working class youth, using the freedom facilitated by a motorcycle to escape into revitalizing open vistas of the landscape of the Scottish Highlands. The production was a part of a group of small-budget cinematic productions, along with titles such as Gregory's Girl (1981) and Local Hero (1983), that brought stories of contemporary life in Scotland to a global cinema audience. The film acquired cult status, being regarded as a homemade expression of local Scottish cultural pride, becoming a minor media source of insurgent Scottish cultural identity, subliminally juxtaposed to Britishness, and feeding into the developing proto–Scottish Nationalist movement in the arts, with its distinctive soundtrack from the band Big Country, whose music dealt with the same themes.

== Reception ==
The film performed well at the box office in Scotland, but commercially failed in other markets. Paterson recalled "It was a movie made by people nobody had ever heard of. We had an English media press screening on a rainy Monday morning and they were not in the mood. They just didn’t find it funny. The press was horrible. The movie was trashed in a way that very nearly took us out of the industry.”

The Sunday Telegraph called it "a delightful wee film." Evening Standard felt it "ought never to set off with the script it has."

Over time the film developed a cult reputation, particularly in Scotland.

== Musical ==
The film was turned into a musical directed by Michael Hoffman and written by Hoffman, Ninian Dunnett, and Andy Paterson. It featured music inspired by Big Country.

Work on the musical started during COVID and it debuted in 2025.

== See also ==
- Restless Nation
