= Michael Hoffman (director) =

American film director

- Born: Michael Lynn Hoffman; November 30, 1956 (age 69); Hawaii, United States
- Education: Boise State University; Oriel College, Oxford
- Occupations: Film director, writer, producer, painter
- Years active: 1982–present
- Children: 3

Michael Lynn Hoffman (born November 30, 1956) is an American film director.

== Early life and education ==
Hoffman was born in Hawaii: the son of Dorothy (Harper) and Glenn R. Hoffman, who was stationed in the navy in Hawaii at the time. He grew up in Payette, Idaho, played basketball, and attended college at Boise State University. There he was elected as student body president of BSU. He cofounded The Idaho Shakespeare Festival with Doug Copsey and Victoria Holloway in 1977. While at BSU, he served as president of the student body and earned the high honor of Rhodes Scholar in 1979, the first BSU alumnus to achieve this honor. While studying Renaissance literature at Oriel College, Oxford, he extended his interest in drama by founding the Oxford University Film Foundation and by making a student film Privileged, which starred a young Hugh Grant.

== Career ==
Befriended by John Schlesinger, who provided the funding, Hoffman's next film was Restless Natives, a humorous look at young Scottish boys who hold up tour buses. His other credits include Some Girls, starring a young Patrick Dempsey, Restoration with Robert Downey, Jr., One Fine Day with Michelle Pfeiffer and George Clooney, Soapdish with Sally Field and Kevin Kline, A Midsummer Night's Dream, for which he also wrote the screenplay based on the work by Shakespeare, and The Emperor's Club (starring Kline and Emile Hirsch). Hoffman has, as of 2023, made three films with Kline, including the aforementioned A Midsummer Night's Dream.

His film Promised Land (1987) was nominated for the Grand Jury Prize at the Sundance Film Festival. Restoration (1995) was entered into the 46th Berlin International Film Festival.

Hoffman wrote and directed The Last Station (2009), based on the final years of Leo Tolstoy's life, starring Christopher Plummer, Helen Mirren, James McAvoy and Paul Giamatti. He also directed Gambit (2012) and The Best of Me (2014).

In addition, Hoffman directed and co-wrote a film for Netflix, a Gore Vidal biopic, simply titled Gore. Based on the biography Empire of Self: A Life of Gore Vidal by Jay Parini (who also co-wrote), it stars Kevin Spacey as Vidal. The film was shot in 2017 and intended for release in 2018 but was canceled in November 2017 after Spacey's sexual misconduct was revealed in late October. Several other projects involving Spacey at the time were also cancelled or had him replaced.

== Filmography ==
=== Film ===
Year	Title	Director	Writer	Notes
1982	Privileged	Yes	Yes	Role: Alan
1985	Restless Natives	Yes	No	
1987	Promised Land	Yes	Yes	
1988	Some Girls	Yes	No	
1991	Soapdish	Yes	No	
1995	Restoration	Yes	No	
1996	One Fine Day	Yes	No	
1999	A Midsummer Night's Dream	Yes	Yes	Also producer
2002	The Emperor's Club	Yes	No	
2002	MDs	Yes	No	
2005	Game 6	Yes	No	
2007	Out of the Blue: A Film About Life and Football	Yes	No	
2009	The Last Station	Yes	Yes	
2012	Gambit	Yes	No	
2014	The Best of Me	Yes	No	
2017	Gore	Yes	Yes	Unreleased
2020	Our Love is Here to Stay	Yes	No	Short film
2024	Amy Winehouse	Yes	No	Co-directed with Wolfe John

Executive producer

- The Great New Wonderful (2005)
- 12 and Holding (2005)
- The Narrows (2008)

=== Television ===
Year	Title	Creator	Director	Writer	Executive producer	Notes
2026	American Classic	Yes	Yes	Yes	Yes	

== Awards and nominations ==
Year	Award	Category	Title	Result
1987	Deauville Film Festival	Critics Award	Promised Land	Nominated
1988	Sundance Film Festival	Grand Jury Prize	Promised Land	Nominated
1988	Vancouver International Film Festival	Most Popular Film	Some Girls	Won
1996	Berlin International Film Festival	Golden Berlin Bear	Restoration	Nominated
2009	Rome Film Festival	Golden Marc'Aurelio Award	The Last Station	Nominated
2009	Hessian Film Award	Best International Literature Adaptation	The Last Station	Won
2010	Independent Spirit Awards	Best Director	The Last Station	Nominated
2010	Independent Spirit Awards	Best Screenplay	The Last Station	Nominated
