= Stewart Stern =

American screenwriter (1922-2015)

- Born: March 22, 1922; New York City, New York, U.S.
- Died: February 2, 2015 (aged 92); Seattle, Washington, U.S.
- Occupations: Screenwriter, teacher
- Years active: 1947–2015
- Spouse: Marilee Stiles (former dancer New York City Ballet)

Stewart Henry Stern (March 22, 1922 – February 2, 2015) was an American screenwriter. He is best known for writing the screenplay for the film Rebel Without a Cause (1955), starring James Dean.

== Writing ==
In addition to Rebel Without a Cause, Stern's most notable screenwriting credits include Sybil, which garnered Emmy awards for both Stern and Sally Field, The Rack starring Paul Newman, The James Dean Story directed by Robert Altman, The Outsider starring Tony Curtis, The Ugly American starring Marlon Brando, Rachel, Rachel starring Joanne Woodward, and The Last Movie directed by Dennis Hopper. He is also author of the book No Tricks in My Pocket: Paul Newman directs, watching the discovery in Paul Newman's direction for the filming of The Glass Menagerie.

== Personal life ==
Stern was the nephew of Adolph Zukor, founder of Paramount Pictures. In World War II he served as an infantryman, seeing combat in the Battle of the Bulge, for which he was awarded the Bronze Star. His war service left him with permanently numb feet due to frostbite. He was the subject of the documentary Going Through Splat: The life and work of Stewart Stern.

Stern taught a course in Seattle titled "The Personal Connection" at TheFilmSchool. He also taught each year at the Sundance Institute.

Stern died of cancer at the age of 92 in Seattle, Washington.

== Filmography ==
=== Film ===
- Benjy (1951) (short) – Writer
- Teresa (1951) – Writer (screenplay, story)
- Rebel Without a Cause (1955) – Writer (screenplay)
- The Rack (1956) – Writer (screenplay)
- The James Dean Story (1957) – Writer
- Thunder in the Sun (1959) – Writer
- The Outsider (1961) – Writer
- The Ugly American (1963) – Writer (screen story)
- Rachel, Rachel (1968) – Writer
- The Last Movie (1971) – Writer
- Summer Wishes, Winter Dreams (1973) – Writer
- Sybil (1976) – Writer (teleplay)
- A Christmas to Remember (1978) - Writer

=== Actor ===
- Fright Night (1985) - Cook
