= List of films with the most weekends at number one in North America =

The following is a list of films with the most weekends as number one at the box office in the United States and Canada.

Films with at least four weekends at number one are listed. They must have been released in 1982 or later to qualify. This limit is in the Box Office Mojo source. On Golden Pond is included with a wide release in 1982 after a limited release in December 1981.

Ties are broken by total domestic box office without adjusting for inflation. E.T. sits atop with 16 weeks at number one (31% of a year). The largest number of films in a year is six in 1986 and 1992.

Six franchises have multiple films on the list:

- Marvel Cinematic Universe: Guardians of the Galaxy (2014), Black Panther (2018), Shang-Chi and the Legend of the Ten Rings (2021), Spider-Man: No Way Home (2021), Black Panther: Wakanda Forever (2022), Deadpool & Wolverine (2024), and Spider-Man: Brand New Day (2026)
- Avatar: Avatar (2009), Avatar: The Way of Water (2022), and Avatar: Fire and Ash (2025)
- Middle-earth: The Fellowship of the Ring (2001) and The Return of the King (2003)
- Police Academy: Police Academy (1984) and Police Academy 2: Their First Assignment (1985)
- Star Wars: Return of the Jedi (1983) and The Force Awakens (2015)
- The Hunger Games: The Hunger Games (2012) and The Hunger Games: Mockingjay – Part 2 (2015)

| Rank | Film | Weekends at number one | Year | Ref |
|---|---|---|---|---|
| 1 | E.T. the Extra-Terrestrial | 16 | 1982 | |
| 2 | Titanic | 15 | 1997 | |
| 3 | Beverly Hills Cop | 14 | 1984 | |
| 4 | Tootsie | 14 | 1982 | |
| 5 | Home Alone | 12 | 1990 | |
| 6 | Back to the Future | 11 | 1985 | |
| 7 | Ghostbusters | 10 | 1984 | |
| 8 | Crocodile Dundee | 9 | 1986 | |
| 9 | Good Morning, Vietnam | 9 | 1987 | |
| 10 | Fatal Attraction | 8 | 1987 | |
| 11 | Porky's | 8 | 1982 | |
| 12 | Avatar | 7 | 2009 | |
| 13 | Avatar: The Way of Water | 7 | 2022 | |
| 14 | On Golden Pond | 7 | 1981 | |
| 15 | Spider-Man: Brand New Day | 6 | 2026 | |
| 16 | Spider-Man: No Way Home | 6 | 2021 | |
| 17 | Return of the Jedi | 6 | 1983 | |
| 18 | The Fugitive | 6 | 1993 | |
| 19 | Rain Man | 6 | 1988 | |
| 20 | Rocky IV | 6 | 1985 | |
| 21 | Terms of Endearment | 6 | 1983 | |
| 22 | Avatar: Fire and Ash | 5 | 2025 | |
| 23 | Black Panther | 5 | 2018 | |
| 24 | Deadpool & Wolverine | 5 | 2024 | |
| 25 | Black Panther: Wakanda Forever | 5 | 2022 | |
| 26 | Forrest Gump | 5 | 1994 | |
| 27 | The Sixth Sense | 5 | 1999 | |
| 28 | Mrs. Doubtfire | 5 | 1993 | |
| 29 | Terminator 2: Judgment Day | 5 | 1991 | |
| 30 | Three Men and a Baby | 5 | 1987 | |
| 31 | Look Who's Talking | 5 | 1989 | |
| 32 | The Silence of the Lambs | 5 | 1991 | |
| 33 | Wayne's World | 5 | 1992 | |
| 34 | Basic Instinct | 5 | 1992 | |
| 35 | Police Academy | 5 | 1984 | |
| 36 | The Golden Child | 5 | 1986 | |
| 37 | Mr. Mom | 5 | 1983 | |
| 38 | The Secret of My Success | 5 | 1987 | |
| 39 | Stakeout | 5 | 1987 | |
| 40 | The Croods: A New Age | 5 | 2020 | |
| 41 | Tenet | 5 | 2020 | |
| 42 | Star Wars: The Force Awakens | 4 | 2015 | |
| 43 | The Dark Knight | 4 | 2008 | |
| 44 | The Lord of the Rings: The Return of the King | 4 | 2003 | |
| 45 | Barbie | 4 | 2023 | |
| 46 | The Super Mario Bros. Movie | 4 | 2023 | |
| 47 | The Passion of the Christ | 4 | 2004 | |
| 48 | Guardians of the Galaxy | 4 | 2014 | |
| 49 | The Lord of the Rings: The Fellowship of the Ring | 4 | 2001 | |
| 50 | Aladdin | 4 | 1992 | |
| 51 | Ghost | 4 | 1990 | |
| 52 | The Hunger Games | 4 | 2012 | |
| 53 | How the Grinch Stole Christmas | 4 | 2000 | |
| 54 | Shang-Chi and the Legend of the Ten Rings | 4 | 2021 | |
| 55 | Saving Private Ryan | 4 | 1998 | |
| 56 | Jumanji: Welcome to the Jungle | 4 | 2017 | |
| 57 | Toy Story | 4 | 1995 | |
| 58 | Rambo: First Blood Part II | 4 | 1985 | |
| 59 | Pretty Woman | 4 | 1990 | |
| 60 | Furious 7 | 4 | 2015 | |
| 61 | Apollo 13 | 4 | 1995 | |
| 62 | Platoon | 4 | 1986 | |
| 63 | A Few Good Men | 4 | 1992 | |
| 64 | The Hunger Games: Mockingjay – Part 2 | 4 | 2015 | |
| 65 | Teenage Mutant Ninja Turtles | 4 | 1990 | |
| 66 | The Karate Kid Part II | 4 | 1986 | |
| 67 | Meet the Parents | 4 | 2000 | |
| 68 | Dumb and Dumber | 4 | 1994 | |
| 69 | Hook | 4 | 1991 | |
| 70 | The Birdcage | 4 | 1996 | |
| 71 | Twins | 4 | 1988 | |
| 72 | The Martian | 4 | 2015 | |
| 73 | Indecent Proposal | 4 | 1993 | |
| 74 | Driving Miss Daisy | 4 | 1989 | |
| 75 | Seven | 4 | 1995 | |
| 76 | Aliens | 4 | 1986 | |
| 77 | The Hand That Rocks the Cradle | 4 | 1992 | |
| 78 | Under Siege | 4 | 1992 | |
| 79 | Beetlejuice | 4 | 1988 | |
| 80 | Never Say Never Again | 4 | 1983 | |
| 81 | Ace Ventura: Pet Detective | 4 | 1994 | |
| 82 | Uncle Buck | 4 | 1989 | |
| 83 | Down and Out in Beverly Hills | 4 | 1986 | |
| 84 | Hot Shots! | 4 | 1991 | |
| 85 | Police Academy 2: Their First Assignment | 4 | 1985 | |
| 86 | Legends of the Fall | 4 | 1994 | |
| 87 | Tightrope | 4 | 1984 | |

== See also ==
- Lists of box office number-one films
- List of highest-grossing films in the United States and Canada
