= List of 1979 box office number-one films in the United States =

This is a list of films which placed number one at the weekly box office in the United States during 1979.

== Number-one films ==
†	This implies the highest-grossing movie of the year.

#	Week ending	Film	Gross	Notes	Ref
1	January 3, 1979	Superman †	$4,859,936	Superman grossed $13,135,498 nationally from all markets for the 4-day weekend ended January 1, a record weekend gross. Its 3-day gross of $10,364,384 beat the record $10.2 million set by Star Wars in its 1978 reissue	
2	January 10, 1979	Superman †	$3,424,808	Superman grossed $7,492,687 for the weekend ended January 7	
3	January 17, 1979	Superman †	$2,461,956		
4	January 24, 1979	Superman †	$2,123,217		
5	January 31, 1979	Superman †	$2,200,610		
6	February 7, 1979	Superman †	$2,045,669		
7	February 14, 1979	The Warriors	$2,159,182	The Warriors grossed $3,529,675 for the weekend ended February 11, 1979 from all markets	
8	February 21, 1979	The Warriors	$1,963,705		
9	February 28, 1979	Superman †	$1,315,729	Superman returned to number one in its eleventh week of release	
10	March 7, 1979	Superman †	$1,082,516		
11	March 14, 1979	Superman †	$1,035,227		
12	March 21, 1979	The China Syndrome	$2,258,078		
13	March 28, 1979	The China Syndrome	$2,486,149		
14	April 4, 1979	The China Syndrome	$2,326,181		
15	April 11, 1979	The China Syndrome	$2,036,307		
16	April 18, 1979	The Deer Hunter	$1,927,378	The Deer Hunter reached number one in its 13th week on the chart	
17	April 25, 1979	The Deer Hunter	$1,340,362		
18	May 2, 1979	Love at First Bite	$1,461,097	Love at First Bite reached number one in its fourth week of release	
19	May 9, 1979	Manhattan	$1,155,174	Manhattan reached number one in its second week of release	
20	May 16, 1979	Manhattan	$1,352,694		
21	May 23, 1979	Manhattan	$1,241,692		
22	May 30, 1979	Alien	$2,327,321	Alien grossed $3,522,581 for the 4-day Memorial Day weekend ended May 28 from all markets	
23	June 6, 1979	Alien	$1,965,402	Alien grossed $2,192,025 for the weekend ended June 3 from all markets	
24	June 13, 1979	Alien	$1,721,543	Alien grossed $2,669,177 for the weekend ended June 10 from all markets	
25	June 20, 1979	Rocky II	$2,570,683	Rocky II grossed $6,390,537 nationally from all markets for the weekend ended June 17	
26	June 27, 1979	Rocky II	$2,747,481		
27	July 4, 1979	Moonraker	$3,585,238	Moonraker grossed $7,108,344 nationally from all markets for the weekend ended July 1	
28	July 11, 1979	Moonraker	$2,839,120		
29	July 18, 1979	Dracula	$1,838,533	Dracula grossed $3,141,281 nationally from all markets for the weekend ended July 15. Meatballs grossed $4,112,000 for the weekend	(Note: Box Office Mojo lists the opening weekend gross for Dracula for the weekend ended July 22 but this is incorrect as Variety reported this weekend gross on July 18)
30	July 25, 1979	Dracula	$1,435,465		
31	August 1, 1979	The Amityville Horror	$4,253,684	The Amityville Horror grossed $7,843,467 nationally for the weekend ended July 29	
32	August 8, 1979	The Amityville Horror	$3,606,900	The Amityville Horror grossed $6,901,959 nationally for the weekend ended August 5	(Note: The Numbers lists the second weekend gross for The Amityville Horror for the weekend ended August 12 as it incorrectly lists the first week twice)
33	August 15, 1979	The Amityville Horror	$2,256,732		
34	August 22, 1979	Star Wars (reissue)	$2,058,618	Star Wars grossed $6,760,165 nationally for the weekend ended August 19	
35	August 29, 1979	The Muppet Movie	$1,037,414	The Muppet Movie reached number one in its tenth week of release	
36	September 5, 1979	The Muppet Movie	$1,060,063		
37	September 12, 1979	North Dallas Forty	$720,867	North Dallas Forty reached number one in its sixth week of release	
38	September 19, 1979	North Dallas Forty	$557,813		
39	September 26, 1979	Monty Python's Life of Brian	$1,262,773	Life of Brian reached number one in its sixth week of release	
40	October 3, 1979	Monty Python's Life of Brian	$1,143,800	When a Stranger Calls grossed $2,597,032 in its opening 4 days. Life of Brian grossed $9,055,143 from 3 weeks of general release	
41	October 10, 1979	Starting Over	$970,650		
42	October 17, 1979	When a Stranger Calls	$1,593,114	When a Stranger Calls reached number one in its third week of release	
43	October 24, 1979	10	$1,649,481	10 reached number one in its second week of release	
44	October 31, 1979	10	$1,437,056		
45	November 7, 1979	10	$1,432,139		
46	November 14, 1979	...And Justice for All	$1,222,477	...And Justice for All. reached number one in its fourth week of release	
47	November 21, 1979	10	$1,098,879	10 returned to number one in its sixth week of release	
48	November 28, 1979	10	$1,426,059		
49	December 5, 1979	10	$965,755		
50	December 12, 1979	Star Trek: The Motion Picture	$5,643,078	Star Trek grossed $11,926,421 nationally from all markets for the weekend ended December 9, beating the 3-day weekend record of $10.3 million set by Superman and the $9.9 million opening weekend record set by Jaws 2	
51	December 19, 1979	Star Trek: The Motion Picture	$3,064,569	Star Trek grossed $7,215,848 nationally from all markets for the weekend ended December 16	
52	December 26, 1979	Star Trek: The Motion Picture	$2,778,258	Star Trek grossed $12,075,000 nationally from all markets for the 5-day weekend ended December 25	

== See also ==
- List of American films — American films by year
- Lists of box office number-one films

== Chronology ==
Preceded by 1978	1979	Succeeded by 1980
