= List of 1980 box office number-one films in the United States =

This is a list of films which placed number one at the weekly box office in the United States during 1980.

== Number-one films ==
†	This implies the highest-grossing movie of the year.

#	Week ending	Film	Gross	Notes	Ref
1	January 2, 1980	Star Trek: The Motion Picture	$3,287,481		
2	January 9, 1980	Kramer vs. Kramer	$1,897,954	Kramer vs. Kramer reached number one in its third week of release	
3	January 16, 1980	Kramer vs. Kramer	$2,018,194		
4	January 23, 1980	Kramer vs. Kramer	$1,655,591	Kramer vs. Kramer grossed $3 million for the weekend ended January 20 from all national markets	
5	January 30, 1980	Kramer vs. Kramer	$1,541,864	Kramer vs. Kramer grossed $3 million for the weekend ended January 27 from all national markets	
6	February 6, 1980	The Silent Scream	$1,919,563	The Silent Scream reached number one in its third week on the chart	
7	February 13, 1980	American Gigolo	$1,463,443	American Gigolo reached number one in its second week of release	
8	February 20, 1980	Cruising	$1,694,803	Cruising grossed $5,096,223 in its opening 5 days. Kramer vs. Kramer grossed $2.8 million for the weekend ended February 17	
9	February 27, 1980	Cruising	$1,229,186		
10	March 5, 1980	The Fog	$1,599,290	The Fog reached number one in its fifth week of release	
11	March 12, 1980	All That Jazz	$1,144,802	All That Jazz reached number one in its twelfth week of release	
12	March 19, 1980	Coal Miner's Daughter	$1,005,036	Coal Miner's Daughter reached number one in its second week of release	
13	March 26, 1980	Kramer vs. Kramer	$1,809,419	Kramer vs. Kramer returned to number one in its 14th week of release. It grossed $1.6 million for the weekend ended March 23 from all markets	
14	April 2, 1980	Little Darlings	$1,918,892	Little Darlings reached number one in its second week of release	
15	April 9, 1980	Little Darlings	$1,545,554		
16	April 16, 1980	Kramer vs. Kramer	$1,194,160	Kramer vs. Kramer returned to number one in its 17th week of release. It grossed $1.6 million for the weekend ended April 13 from all markets	
17	April 23, 1980	Kramer vs. Kramer	$1,335,476	Kramer vs. Kramer grossed $1.8 million for the weekend ended April 20 from all markets	
18	April 30, 1980	Kramer vs. Kramer	$1,078,596	Kramer vs. Kramer grossed $1.4 million for the weekend ended April 27 from all markets. Where the Buffalo Roam grossed $1.8 million.	
19	May 7, 1980	Kramer vs. Kramer	$847,617	Kramer vs. Kramer grossed $1.1 million for the weekend ended May 4 from all markets	
20	May 14, 1980	Friday the 13th	$2,237,500	Friday the 13th grossed $5,816,321 for the weekend ended May 11 from all markets	
21	May 21, 1980	Friday the 13th	$1,945,657		
22	May 28, 1980	The Empire Strikes Back †	$4,064,022	The Empire Strikes Back grossed $6,415,804 for the 4-day Memorial Day weekend from all markets	
23	June 4, 1980	The Empire Strikes Back †	$3,415,791		
24	June 11, 1980	The Empire Strikes Back †	$3,225,299	The Empire Strikes Back grossed $4,339,769 for the weekend ended June 8 from all markets	
25	June 18, 1980	The Empire Strikes Back †	$2,817,077	The Empire Strikes Back grossed $3,606,000 nationally from all markets for the weekend ended June 15. Bronco Billy grossed $3,708,710	
26	June 25, 1980	The Empire Strikes Back †	$3,711,553	The Empire Strikes Back grossed $10,840,307 nationally from all markets for the weekend ended June 22	
27	July 2, 1980	The Empire Strikes Back †	$3,416,490	The Empire Strikes Back grossed $9,217,874 nationally from all markets for the weekend ended June 29	
28	July 9, 1980	The Empire Strikes Back †	$2,893,659	The Empire Strikes Back grossed $8,309,772 nationally from all markets for the weekend ended July 6	
29	July 16, 1980	Airplane!	$2,739,328	Airplane! reached number one in its third week of release grossing $7,105,024 for the five days to July 13 from all markets. The Empire Strikes Back grossed $6,652,858 nationally from all markets for the 3-day weekend	
30	July 23, 1980	Airplane!	$2,662,155		
31	July 30, 1980	Airplane!	$2,096,358		
32	August 6, 1980	Airplane!	$2,209,013	The Empire Strikes Back was number one nationally for the 3-day weekend with a gross of $5,758,759 from all markets	
33	August 13, 1980	Dressed to Kill	$1,745,388	Dressed to Kill reached number one in its third week of release. It grossed $2,942,000 for the weekend ended August 10 from all markets. The Empire Strikes Back grossed $4,554,679 for the weekend	
34	August 20, 1980	Smokey and the Bandit II	$1,860,800	Smokey and the Bandit II grossed $10,883,835 nationally for the weekend ended August 17, a record August opening	
35	August 27, 1980	Smokey and the Bandit II	$2,140,529	Smokey and the Bandit II grossed $8,395,755 nationally for the weekend ended August 24	
36	September 3, 1980	Smokey and the Bandit II	$1,451,882		
37	September 10, 1980	Smokey and the Bandit II	$820,196		
38	September 17, 1980	The Exterminator	$1,143,000		
39	September 24, 1980	The Exterminator	$858,000		
40	October 1, 1980	Hopscotch	$1,252,492	Hopscotch grossed $2,552,864 nationally from all markets for the weekend ended September 28	
41	October 8, 1980	Hopscotch	$1,126,721		
42	October 15, 1980	Private Benjamin	$1,187,114	Private Benjamin grossed $4,739,769 from all markets for the weekend ended October 12	
43	October 22, 1980	Private Benjamin	$1,201,574	Private Benjamin grossed $4,935,571 from all markets for the weekend ended October 19	
44	October 29, 1980	Private Benjamin	$1,954,556		
45	November 5, 1980	Private Benjamin	$1,756,902		
46	November 12, 1980	Private Benjamin	$1,628,001		
47	November 19, 1980	Private Benjamin	$1,281,696		
48	November 26, 1980	Private Benjamin	$1,016,984		
49	December 3, 1980	Private Benjamin	$872,420		
50	December 10, 1980	Flash Gordon	$1,428,771	Flash Gordon grossed $3,934,030 from all markets for the weekend ended December 7	
51	December 17, 1980	Stir Crazy	$2,463,066	Stir Crazy grossed $8.7 million nationally from all markets for the weekend ended December 14	
52	December 24, 1980	Stir Crazy	$2,371,298	Stir Crazy grossed $6,656,501 nationally from all markets for the weekend ended December 21. Any Which Way You Can grossed $8,024,663	
53	December 31, 1980	Stir Crazy	$2,424,829	Stir Crazy grossed $7,938,584 for the weekend ended December 28. Any Which Way You Can grossed $10,091,105	

== Highest grossing films ==
Rank	Title	Distributor	Rental
1	The Empire Strikes Back	20th Century Fox	$120,000,000
2	Kramer vs. Kramer	Columbia Pictures	$60,528,000
3	The Jerk	Universal Pictures	$43,000,000
4	Airplane!	Paramount Pictures	$38,000,000
5	Smokey and the Bandit II	Universal Pictures	$37,600,000
6	Coal Miner's Daughter	Universal Pictures	$36,000,000
7	Private Benjamin	Warner Bros.	$33,500,000
8	The Blues Brothers	Universal Pictures	$31,000,000
9	The Electric Horseman	Columbia Pictures	$30,917,000
10	The Shining	Warner Bros.	$30,200,000

== See also ==
- List of American films — American films by year
- Lists of box office number-one films

== Chronology ==
Preceded by 1979	1980	Succeeded by 1981
