= List of 1978 box office number-one films in the United States =

This is a list of films which placed number one at the weekly box office in the United States during 1978.

== Number-one films ==
†	This implies the highest-grossing movie of the year.

#	Week ending	Film	Gross	Notes	Ref
1	January 4, 1978	Close Encounters of the Third Kind	$4,435,990		
2	January 11, 1978	Close Encounters of the Third Kind	$3,377,392		
3	January 18, 1978	Close Encounters of the Third Kind	$2,274,682		
4	January 25, 1978	Close Encounters of the Third Kind	$1,622,296		
5	February 1, 1978	Close Encounters of the Third Kind	$1,774,208		
6	February 8, 1978	Close Encounters of the Third Kind	$1,489,164		(Note: The Numbers lists The One and Only with a gross of $2,707,679 from 417 theaters for the weekend ended February 5. Close Encounters of the Third Kind grossed $5,143,795 nationally for the week from 629 theaters)
7	February 15, 1978	The Betsy	$1,339,400	The Betsy grossed $2,727,084 nationally from all markets in the weekend ended February 12, an opening record for Allied Artists	
8	February 22, 1978	Saturday Night Fever	$1,605,673	Saturday Night Fever reached number one in its tenth week on the chart	
9	March 1, 1978	Saturday Night Fever	$2,171,501	Saturday Night Fever grossed $3,765,000 nationally from all markets in the weekend ended February 26	
10	March 8, 1978	Saturday Night Fever	$1,687,869		
11	March 15, 1978	Saturday Night Fever	$1,398,108		
12	March 22, 1978	Saturday Night Fever	$1,207,132		
13	March 29, 1978	The Fury	$1,444,416	The Fury reached number one in its second week of release grossing $2,777,291 nationally for the weekend ended March 26	
14	April 5, 1978	The Fury	$1,257,159		
15	April 12, 1978	The Goodbye Girl	$969,830	The Goodbye Girl reached number one in its 19th week on the chart	
16	April 19, 1978	The Goodbye Girl	$788,848		
17	April 26, 1978	House Calls	$949,285	House Calls reached number one in its sixth week on the chart	
18	May 3, 1978	House Calls	$818,620		
19	May 10, 1978	F.I.S.T.	$724,367	F.I.S.T. reached number one in its second week of release	
20	May 17, 1978	The Greek Tycoon	$677,300		
21	May 24, 1978	The Greek Tycoon	$981,908		
22	May 31, 1978	American Graffiti (reissue)	$1,361,800		
23	June 7, 1978	Capricorn One	$1,411,600		
24	June 14, 1978	Damien: Omen II	$2,216,400	Damien: Omen II grossed $3,880,880 nationally from all markets in the weekend ended June 11	
25	June 21, 1978	Jaws 2	$4,038,800	Jaws 2 grossed $9.9 million nationally from all markets in the weekend ended June 18, an opening weekend record	
26	June 28, 1978	Grease †	$4,174,082	Grease reached number one in its second week of release, grossing $7,867,000 nationally from all markets in the weekend ended June 25	
27	July 5, 1978	Grease †	$3,518,287		
28	July 12, 1978	Grease †	$2,443,707		
29	July 19, 1978	Grease †	$2,129,200		
30	July 26, 1978	Grease †	$1,977,551	Star Wars (reissue) placed third on the chart from 166 theaters but grossed $10,166,366 nationally from 1,750 theaters in the weekend ended July 23, beating the weekend record set by Jaws 2	
31	August 2, 1978	Star Wars (reissue)	$1,891,255	Star Wars grossed $6,501,185 nationally in the weekend ended July 30	
32	August 9, 1978	Hooper	$2,476,400	Hooper reached number one in its third week of release. Its nationwide gross for the week was $9,437,484.	
33	August 16, 1978	Hooper	$1,988,915		
34	August 23, 1978	Hooper	$1,747,842		
35	August 30, 1978	Animal House	$2,022,990	Animal House reached number one in its fifth week on the chart	
36	September 6, 1978	Animal House	$2,103,917		
37	September 13, 1978	Animal House	$1,557,835		
38	September 20, 1978	Animal House	$1,251,100		
39	September 27, 1978	Animal House	$1,085,881		
40	October 4, 1978	Up in Smoke	$1,109,000	Up in Smoke reached number one in its second week of release	
41	October 11, 1978	Animal House	$1,868,567	Animal House returned to number one in its eleventh week of release	
42	October 18, 1978	Animal House	$1,337,828		
43	October 25, 1978	Animal House	$1,298,347		
44	November 1, 1978	Midnight Express	$1,300,711	Midnight Express reached number one in its fourth week of release	
45	November 8, 1978	Up in Smoke	$1,443,320	Up in Smoke returned to number one in its seventh week of release.	
46	November 15, 1978	Magic	$1,376,000		
47	November 22, 1978	Magic	$1,177,317		
48	November 29, 1978	Midnight Express	$993,743	Midnight Express returned to number one in its eighth week of release	
49	December 6, 1978	Midnight Express	$746,543		
50	December 13, 1978	Midnight Express	$590,763		
51	December 20, 1978	Superman	$3,685,756	Superman grossed $7,465,343 nationally from all markets in the weekend ended December 17, beating King Kong's December opening record	
52	December 27, 1978	Superman	$4,171,899	Superman grossed $6,535,784 nationally from all markets in the weekend ended December 24	(Note: Box Office Mojo and The Numbers list Every Which Way but Loose as the number one for the weekend with a gross of $10,272,294 however, this is its gross for the week.)

== Highest grossing films ==
Rank	Title	Distributor	Rental
1	Grease	Paramount Pictures	$83,091,000
2	Saturday Night Fever	Paramount Pictures	$71,463,000
3	Close Encounters of the Third Kind	Columbia Pictures	$54,000,000
4	Animal House	Universal Pictures	$52,368,000
5	Jaws 2	Universal Pictures	$49,299,000
6	Heaven Can Wait	Paramount Pictures	$42,517,000
7	The Goodbye Girl	Warner Bros.	$41,000,000
8	Star Wars (reissue)	20th Century Fox	$38,375,000
9	Hooper	Warner Bros.	$31,500,000
10	Foul Play	Paramount Pictures	$25,065,000

== See also ==
- List of American films — American films by year
- Lists of box office number-one films

== Chronology ==
Preceded by 1977	1978	Succeeded by 1979
