= List of 1977 box office number-one films in the United States =

This is a list of films which placed number one at the weekly box office in the United States during 1977.

== Number-one films ==
†	This implies the highest-grossing movie of the year.

#	Week ending	Film	Gross	Notes	Ref
1	January 5, 1977	King Kong	$3,025,159		
2	January 12, 1977	King Kong	$2,088,200		
3	January 19, 1977	King Kong	$1,206,064		
4	January 26, 1977	Rocky	$1,251,000	Rocky reached number one in its ninth week on the chart	
5	February 2, 1977	Rocky	$1,135,500		
6	February 9, 1977	Rocky	$1,351,500		
7	February 16, 1977	Rocky	$1,710,167		
8	February 23, 1977	Rocky	$1,887,822		
9	March 2, 1977	Rocky	$1,715,985		
10	March 9, 1977	Rocky	$1,533,124		
11	March 16, 1977	Rocky	$1,212,454		
12	March 23, 1977	Rocky	$1,177,547		
13	March 30, 1977	Airport '77	$1,350,700		
14	April 6, 1977	Rocky	$1,792,674	Rocky returned to number one in its 19th week on the chart	
15	April 13, 1977	Rocky	$1,688,305		
16	April 20, 1977	Rocky	$1,277,740		
17	April 27, 1977	Rocky	$1,088,195		
18	May 4, 1977	It's Alive (reissue)	$786,250	It's Alive reached number one in its 15th week on the chart	
19	May 11, 1977	Annie Hall	$855,733	Annie Hall reached number one in its third week of release	
20	May 18, 1977	Annie Hall	$851,382		
21	May 25, 1977	The Greatest	$1,361,800		
22	June 1, 1977	Star Wars †	$1,947,500	Star Wars grossed $2,556,418 nationally in its first six days to the end of the Memorial Day weekend from 43 theaters. Smokey and the Bandit grossed $2,689,851 in the four-day weekend from 386 theaters	
23	June 8, 1977	Star Wars †	$1,971,000		
24	June 15, 1977	Star Wars †	$2,231,800		
25	June 22, 1977	The Deep	$3,033,800	The Deep grossed $8,124,316 nationally from all markets in the weekend ended June 19, an opening weekend record	
26	June 29, 1977	The Deep	$2,931,262		
27	July 6, 1977	The Deep	$2,679,766		
28	July 13, 1977	Star Wars †	$2,291,696	Star Wars returned to number one in its seventh week of release grossing $6,197,462 nationally in the weekend ended July 10	
29	July 20, 1977	Star Wars †	$2,231,720	Star Wars grossed $6,806,951 nationally in the weekend ended July 17	
30	July 27, 1977	Star Wars †	$2,789,667	Star Wars grossed $7,000,644 nationally in the weekend ended July 24	
31	August 3, 1977	Star Wars †	$2,102,935	Star Wars grossed $6,234,376 nationally (not including Canadian theaters) in the weekend ended July 24	
32	August 10, 1977	Star Wars †	$3,620,800	Star Wars grossed $7,195,573 nationally in the weekend ended August 7	
33	August 17, 1977	Star Wars †	$3,267,789	Star Wars grossed $6,705,755 nationally in the weekend ended August 14	
34	August 24, 1977	Star Wars †	$2,784,881	Star Wars grossed $5,908,751 nationally in the weekend ended August 21	
35	August 31, 1977	Star Wars †	$2,387,982	Star Wars grossed $5,239,535 nationally in the weekend ended August 28	
36	September 7, 1977	Star Wars †	$2,330,800	Star Wars grossed $7,737,847 nationally in the 4-day Labor Day weekend	
37	September 14, 1977	Star Wars †	$1,661,131	Star Wars grossed $4,648,085 nationally in the weekend ended September 11	
38	September 21, 1977	Star Wars †	$2,051,900	Star Wars grossed $5,684,969 nationally in the weekend ended September 18	
39	September 28, 1977	Star Wars †	$2,005,746	Star Wars grossed $5,117,235 nationally in the weekend ended September 25	
40	October 5, 1977	Star Wars †	$1,752,210	Star Wars grossed $4,475,000 nationally in the weekend ended October 2	
41	October 12, 1977	Star Wars †	$1,446,583	Star Wars grossed $4,538,323 nationally for the 4-day Columbus Day weekend	
42	October 19, 1977	Star Wars †	$1,227,260		
43	October 26, 1977	Looking For Mr Goodbar	$1,293,400	Star Wars placed second on the chart based on 104 theaters but grossed $2,891,000 nationally in the weekend ended October 23 compared to $1,540,635 for Looking For Mr Goodbar	
44	November 2, 1977	Oh, God!	$1,320,452	Oh, God! reached number one in its fourth week of release. It grossed $1,508,511 nationally for the weekend ended October 30. Star Wars placed third on the chart based on 98 theaters but grossed $3,292,879 for the same period nationally from 739 theaters	
45	November 9, 1977	Looking For Mr Goodbar	$1,742,750	Looking For Mr Goodbar returned to number one in its third week of release. Nationally it was only in 110 theaters; Star Wars placed third on the chart based on 104 theaters but in 665 theaters nationally it grossed $2,626,914 for the weekend ended November 6	
46	November 16, 1977	Looking For Mr Goodbar	$1,194,150	Looking For Mr Goodbar was only in 110 theaters nationally; Star Wars placed third on the chart based on 105 theaters but in 642 theaters nationally it grossed $2,269,052 for the weekend ended November 13	
47	November 23, 1977	Looking For Mr Goodbar	$1,027,000	Looking For Mr Goodbar expanded to 214 theaters nationally; Star Wars placed third on the chart based on 91 theaters but in 605 theaters nationally it grossed $1,949,157 for the weekend ended November 20	
48	November 30, 1977	Star Wars †	$1,283,735	Star Wars returned to number one in its 27th week of release grossing $2,472,656 nationally for the weekend ended November 27	
49	December 7, 1977	Oh, God!	$888,857	Oh, God! returned to number one in its ninth week of release	
50	December 14, 1977	Star Wars †	$585,541	Star Wars returned to number one in its 29th week of release grossing $1,152,953 nationally for the weekend ended December 11	
51	December 21, 1977	Close Encounters of the Third Kind	$3,856,656	Close Encounters of the Third Kind reached number one in its fifth week of release and grossed $5,379,460 nationally from all markets in the weekend ended December 18	
52	December 28, 1977	Close Encounters of the Third Kind	$3,868,450		

== See also ==
- List of American films — American films by year
- Lists of box office number-one films

== Chronology ==
Preceded by 1976	1977	Succeeded by 1978
