= List of 1981 box office number-one films in the United States =

This is a list of films which have placed number one at the weekend box office in the United States during 1981.

== Number-one films ==
#	Week ending	Film	Gross	Notes	Ref
1	January 4, 1981	9 to 5	$7,111,919		
2	January 11, 1981	9 to 5	$6,388,982		
3	January 18, 1981	9 to 5	$6,014,902		
4	January 25, 1981	Stir Crazy	TBD		
5	February 1, 1981	The Incredible Shrinking Woman	$4,279,264		
6	February 8, 1981	Fort Apache, The Bronx	$4,565,000		
7	February 15, 1981	Fort Apache, The Bronx	$4,000,000		
8	February 22, 1981	Fort Apache, The Bronx	TBD		
9	March 1, 1981	Fort Apache, The Bronx	TBD		
10	March 8, 1981	Fort Apache, The Bronx	TBD		
11	March 15, 1981	Back Roads	$3,046,339		
12	March 22, 1981	Omen III: The Final Conflict	$5,571,675		
13	March 29, 1981	Omen III: The Final Conflict	TBD		
14	April 5, 1981	Hardly Working	$4,160,193		
15	April 12, 1981	Star Wars (reissue)	$6,549,751		
16	April 19, 1981	Star Wars (reissue)	$4,564,616		
17	April 26, 1981	Excalibur	$3,144,818		
18	May 3, 1981	Friday the 13th Part 2	$6,420,784		
19	May 10, 1981	Friday the 13th Part 2	TBD		
20	May 17, 1981	Happy Birthday to Me	$3,712,597		
21	May 25, 1981^{4-day weekend}	Bustin' Loose	$6,622,753		
22	May 31, 1981	The Four Seasons	$4,355,238		
23	June 7, 1981	Cheech and Chong's Nice Dreams	$8,153,738		
24	June 14, 1981	Raiders of the Lost Ark	$8,305,823		
25	June 21, 1981	Superman II	$14,100,523	Superman II had the highest weekend debut of all-time beating the record of $11.9 million set by Star Trek: The Motion Picture.	
26	June 28, 1981	Superman II	$10,765,687	Superman II becomes the first film to have more than one weekend with a gross over $10 million.	
27	July 5, 1981	Superman II	$10,905,892		
28	July 12, 1981	Superman II	$6,745,678		
29	July 19, 1981	Raiders of the Lost Ark	$6,450,189	Raiders of the Lost Ark reclaimed number 1 in its sixth weekend of release.	
30	July 26, 1981	Tarzan, the Ape Man	$6,700,809		
31	August 2, 1981	The Empire Strikes Back (reissue)	$7,001,282		
32	August 9, 1981	Raiders of the Lost Ark	$4,046,228	Raiders of the Lost Ark reclaimed number 1 in its ninth weekend of release.	
33	August 16, 1981	Raiders of the Lost Ark	$5,157,432		
34	August 23, 1981	Raiders of the Lost Ark	$4,183,784		
35	August 30, 1981	Raiders of the Lost Ark	$3,909,879		
36	September 7, 1981^{4-day weekend}	Raiders of the Lost Ark	$5,406,403		
37	September 13, 1981	Arthur	$3,002,255		
38	September 20, 1981	Continental Divide	$3,218,347		
39	September 27, 1981	Mommie Dearest	$4,667,761		
40	October 4, 1981	Paternity	$3,610,147		
41	October 11, 1981	Paternity	$3,227,174		
42	October 18, 1981	Paternity	$2,442,503		
43	October 25, 1981	The French Lieutenant's Woman	TBD		
44	November 1, 1981	Halloween II	$7,676,836		
45	November 8, 1981	Time Bandits	$6,507,356		
46	November 15, 1981	Time Bandits	$5,336,032		
47	November 22, 1981	Time Bandits	$3,700,000		
48	November 29, 1981	Time Bandits	$5,000,000		
49	December 6, 1981	Raiders of the Lost Ark	$2,441,000	Raiders of the Lost Ark reclaimed number 1 in its 26th weekend of release.	
50	December 13, 1981	Rollover	$2,260,889		
51	December 20, 1981	Neighbors	$6,481,386		
52	December 27, 1981	Neighbors	$5,821,835		

== Highest-grossing films ==
The top ten films released in 1981 by box office gross in the United States and Canada are as follows:

Highest-grossing films of 1981 based on year of release
Rank	Title	Distributor	Domestic gross
1	Raiders of the Lost Ark	Paramount	$212,222,025
2	On Golden Pond	Universal	$119,285,432
3	Superman II	Warner Bros.	$108,185,706
4	Arthur	Warner Bros.	$95,461,682
5	Stripes	Columbia	$85,297,000
6	The Cannonball Run	20th Century Fox	$72,179,579
7	Chariots of Fire	Warner Bros.	$58,972,904
8	For Your Eyes Only	United Artists	$54,812,802
9	The Four Seasons	Universal	$50,427,646
10	Time Bandits	Embassy	$42,365,581

== See also ==
- List of American films — American films by year
- Lists of box office number-one films

== Chronology ==
Preceded by 1980	1981	Succeeded by 1982
