= List of 1988 box office number-one films in the United States =

This is a list of films which have placed number one at the weekend box office in the United States during 1988.

== Number-one films ==
†	This implies the highest-grossing movie of the year.

#	Weekend end date	Film	Box office	Notes	Ref
1	January 3, 1988	Three Men and a Baby	$13,123,622	Buena Vista's biggest weekend of all-time.	
2	January 10, 1988	Three Men and a Baby	$8,103,282		
3	January 17, 1988	Good Morning, Vietnam	$11,752,913	Good Morning, Vietnam reached No. 1 in its fourth weekend of release after expanding to 785 theatres.	
4	January 24, 1988	Good Morning, Vietnam	$10,806,276		
5	January 31, 1988	Good Morning, Vietnam	$8,260,432		
6	February 7, 1988	Good Morning, Vietnam	$8,564,496		
7	February 15, 1988^{4-day weekend}	Good Morning, Vietnam	$9,011,354		
8	February 21, 1988	Good Morning, Vietnam	$6,883,781		
9	February 28, 1988	Good Morning, Vietnam	$5,232,945		
10	March 6, 1988	Good Morning, Vietnam	$5,141,491		
11	March 13, 1988	Good Morning, Vietnam	$4,369,592		
12	March 20, 1988	Police Academy 5: Assignment Miami Beach	$6,106,661	Police Academy 5 was the first non-Buena Vista film at number one for 12 weeks.	
13	March 27, 1988	Biloxi Blues	$7,093,325		
14	April 3, 1988	Beetlejuice	$8,030,897		
15	April 10, 1988	Beetlejuice	$8,667,702		
16	April 17, 1988	Beetlejuice	$7,145,123		
17	April 24, 1988	Beetlejuice	$6,201,234		
18	May 1, 1988	Colors	$6,524,536	Colors reached No. 1 in its third weekend of release.	
19	May 8, 1988	Colors	$4,007,400		
20	May 15, 1988	Friday the 13th Part VII: The New Blood	$8,245,038		
21	May 22, 1988	Willow	$8,300,169		
22	May 30, 1988^{4-day weekend}	Crocodile Dundee II	$24,462,976	Crocodile Dundee II broke National Lampoon's European Vacation's record ($12 million) for the highest weekend debut for a comedy film and had the highest weekend debut of 1988.	
23	June 5, 1988	Crocodile Dundee II	$12,717,140		
24	June 12, 1988	Crocodile Dundee II	$8,519,246		
25	June 19, 1988	Red Heat	$8,133,822		
26	June 26, 1988	Who Framed Roger Rabbit †	$11,226,239	Buena Vista's biggest opening weekend beating Three Men and a Baby.	
27	July 4, 1988^{4-day weekend}	Coming to America	$21,404,420	Coming to America broke Back to the Future's record ($11.1 million) for the highest Fourth of July weekend debut.	
28	July 10, 1988	Coming to America	$13,342,707		
29	July 17, 1988	Coming to America	$10,417,790		
30	July 24, 1988	Who Framed Roger Rabbit †	$8,919,732	Who Framed Roger Rabbit reclaimed #1 in its fifth weekend of release.	
31	July 31, 1988	Cocktail	$11,789,466		
32	August 7, 1988	Cocktail	$8,204,479		
33	August 14, 1988	Young Guns	$7,011,393		
34	August 21, 1988	A Nightmare on Elm Street 4: The Dream Master	$12,833,403	A Nightmare on Elm Street 4: The Dream Master was the highest opening for an independent film and broke Friday the 13th: The Final Chapter's record ($11.1 million) for highest weekend debut for a slasher film, and also broke Smokey and the Bandit II's record ($10.8 million) for the highest weekend debut in the month of August.	
35	August 28, 1988	A Nightmare on Elm Street 4: The Dream Master	$6,989,358		
36	September 5, 1988^{4-day weekend}	A Nightmare on Elm Street 4: The Dream Master	$6,435,710		
37	September 11, 1988	Moon over Parador	$3,268,975		
38	September 18, 1988	A Fish Called Wanda	$2,555,291	A Fish Called Wanda reached No. 1 in its tenth weekend of release.	
39	September 25, 1988	Dead Ringers	$3,012,180		
40	October 2, 1988	Gorillas in the Mist	$3,451,230	Gorillas in the Mist reached No. 1 in its second week of release.	
41	October 10, 1988^{4-day weekend}	Alien Nation	$8,421,429		
42	October 16, 1988	The Accused	$4,316,369		
43	October 23, 1988	Halloween 4: The Return of Michael Myers	$6,831,250		
44	October 30, 1988	Halloween 4: The Return of Michael Myers	$4,510,500		
45	November 6, 1988	They Live	$4,827,903		
46	November 13, 1988	Child's Play	$6,583,963		
47	November 20, 1988	The Land Before Time	$7,526,025	The Land Before Time broke An American Tail's record ($5.2 million) for the highest weekend debut for an animated film and for a non-Disney animated film.	
48	November 27, 1988	Scrooged	$13,027,842		
49	December 4, 1988	The Naked Gun: From the Files of Police Squad!	$9,331,746		
50	December 11, 1988	Twins	$11,174,980		
51	December 18, 1988	Twins	$7,781,130		
52	December 26, 1988	Twins	$8,958,675		
53	January 2, 1989	Rain Man	$14,350,610	Rain Man reached No. 1 in its third weekend of release.	

== Highest-grossing films ==
=== Calendar Gross ===
Highest-grossing films of 1988 by Calendar Gross

Rank	Title	Studio(s)	Actor(s)	Director(s)	Gross
1.	Who Framed Roger Rabbit	Walt Disney Studios	Bob Hoskins, Christopher Lloyd, Charles Fleischer, Stubby Kaye and Joanna Cassidy	Robert Zemeckis	$156,452,370
2.	Coming to America	Paramount Pictures	Eddie Murphy, Arsenio Hall, James Earl Jones, John Amos, Madge Sinclair and Shari Headley	John Landis	$128,152,301
3.	Good Morning, Vietnam	Walt Disney Studios	Robin Williams and Forest Whitaker	Barry Levinson	$122,231,991
4.	Big	20th Century Fox	Tom Hanks, Elizabeth Perkins, Robert Loggia and John Heard	Penny Marshall	$114,968,774
5.	Crocodile Dundee II	Paramount Pictures	Paul Hogan, Linda Kozlowski and John Meillon	John Cornell	$109,306,210
6.	Three Men and a Baby	Walt Disney Studios	Tom Selleck, Steve Guttenberg and Ted Danson	Leonard Nimoy	$90,528,478
7.	Die Hard	20th Century Fox	Bruce Willis, Alan Rickman, Alexander Godunov, Bonnie Bedelia, William Atherton, Reginald VelJohnson, Hart Bochner, Paul Gleason and Robert Davi	John McTiernan	$83,008,852
8.	Moonstruck	Metro-Goldwyn-Mayer	Cher, Nicolas Cage, Vincent Gardenia, Olympia Dukakis and Danny Aiello	Norman Jewison	$80,034,239
9.	Cocktail	Walt Disney Studios	Tom Cruise, Bryan Brown and Elisabeth Shue	Roger Donaldson	$78,222,753
10.	Beetlejuice	Warner Bros. Pictures	Alec Baldwin, Geena Davis, Jeffrey Jones, Catherine O'Hara, Winona Ryder and Michael Keaton	Tim Burton	$73,707,461

=== In-Year Release ===
Highest-grossing films of 1988 by In-year release
Rank	Title	Distributor	Domestic gross
1.	Rain Man	Metro-Goldwyn-Mayer	$172,825,435
2.	Who Framed Roger Rabbit	Disney	$156,452,370
3.	Coming to America	Paramount	$128,152,301
4.	Big	20th Century Fox	$114,968,774
5.	Twins	Universal	$111,938,388
6.	Crocodile Dundee II	Paramount	$109,306,210
7.	Die Hard	20th Century Fox	$83,008,852
8.	The Naked Gun: From the Files of Police Squad!	Paramount	$78,756,177
9.	Cocktail	Disney	$78,222,753
10.	Beetlejuice	Warner Bros.	$73,707,461

Highest-grossing films by MPAA rating of 1988
G	Oliver & Company
PG	Who Framed Roger Rabbit
PG-13	The Naked Gun: From the Files of Police Squad!
R	Rain Man

== See also ==
- List of American films — American films by year
- Lists of box office number-one films

== Chronology ==
Preceded by 1987	1988	Succeeded by 1989
