= List of 1986 box office number-one films in the United States =

This is a list of films which have placed number one at the weekend box office in the United States during 1986.

== Number-one films ==
†	This implies the highest-grossing movie of the year.

#	Weekend end date	Film	Box office	Notes	Ref
1	January 5, 1986	Rocky IV	$7,147,074		
2	January 12, 1986	Out of Africa	$5,137,370	Out of Africa reached number 1 in its fourth weekend of release.	
3	January 19, 1986	Iron Eagle	$6,104,754		
4	January 26, 1986	The Color Purple	$4,412,456	The Color Purple reached number 1 in its seventh weekend of release.	
5	February 2, 1986	Down and Out in Beverly Hills	$5,726,495		
6	February 9, 1986	Down and Out in Beverly Hills	$6,112,115		
7	February 17, 1986^{4-day weekend}	Down and Out in Beverly Hills	$7,023,743		
8	February 23, 1986	Down and Out in Beverly Hills	$5,042,912		
9	March 2, 1986	Pretty in Pink	$6,065,870		
10	March 9, 1986	Pretty in Pink	$4,919,668		
11	March 16, 1986	Gung Ho	$7,170,830		
12	March 23, 1986	Police Academy 3: Back in Training	$9,049,586		
13	March 30, 1986	Police Academy 3: Back in Training	$5,750,986		
14	April 6, 1986	Police Academy 3: Back in Training	$5,089,751		
15	April 13, 1986	The Money Pit	$3,646,200	The Money Pit reached number 1 in its third weekend of release.	
16	April 20, 1986	Legend	$4,261,154		
17	April 27, 1986	Legend	$2,591,751		
18	May 4, 1986	Jo Jo Dancer, Your Life Is Calling	$4,879,107		
19	May 11, 1986	Short Circuit	$5,346,808	Independent sources suggested that the film only grossed between $4.5 to $4.725 million.	
20	May 18, 1986	Top Gun †	$8,193,052		
21	May 26, 1986^{4-day weekend}	Cobra	$15,652,147	Cobra broke Superman II's record ($14.1 million) for highest weekend debut for a Warner Bros. film.	
22	June 1, 1986	Cobra	$7,511,542		
23	June 8, 1986	Top Gun †	$8,231,279	Top Gun reclaimed number 1 in fourth weekend of release.	
24	June 15, 1986	Back to School	$8,881,035		
25	June 22, 1986	The Karate Kid Part II	$12,652,336		
26	June 29, 1986	The Karate Kid Part II	$8,870,625		
27	July 6, 1986	The Karate Kid Part II	$6,284,953		
28	July 13, 1986	The Karate Kid Part II	$6,667,787		
29	July 20, 1986	Aliens	$10,052,042	Aliens broke Halloween II's record ($7.67 million) for highest weekend debut for a film featuring a female protagonist.	
30	July 27, 1986	Aliens	$8,640,292		
31	August 3, 1986	Aliens	$7,060,101	Initial estimates had Friday the 13th Part VI: Jason Lives ahead of Aliens.	
32	August 10, 1986	Aliens	$5,779,352		
33	August 17, 1986	The Fly	$7,007,423		
34	August 24, 1986	The Fly	$4,725,970		
35	September 1, 1986^{4-day weekend}	Stand by Me	$5,037,343	Stand by Me reached number 1 in its second weekend of release.	
36	September 7, 1986	Stand by Me	$3,426,615		
37	September 14, 1986	Stand by Me	$3,010,922		
38	September 21, 1986	Top Gun †	$3,292,817	Top Gun reclaimed number 1 in its nineteenth week of release, with the 14 week gap since it was last number one, the longest gap for a film since 1982.	
39	September 28, 1986	Crocodile Dundee	$8,038,855	Crocodile Dundee set the record for highest-grossing weekend in September.	
40	October 5, 1986	Crocodile Dundee	$8,207,503		
41	October 13, 1986^{4-day weekend}	Crocodile Dundee	$10,560,827		
42	October 19, 1986	Crocodile Dundee	$7,434,202		
43	October 26, 1986	Crocodile Dundee	$6,745,249		
44	November 2, 1986	Crocodile Dundee	$5,716,215		
45	November 9, 1986	Crocodile Dundee	$6,392,661		
46	November 16, 1986	Crocodile Dundee	$5,521,551		
47	November 23, 1986	Crocodile Dundee	$5,537,875	In second place, An American Tail's opening ($5.2 million) broke The Fox and the Hound's record ($4.2 million) for the highest weekend debut for an animated film and The Care Bears Movie's record ($3.7 million) for the highest weekend debut for a non-Disney animated film.	
48	November 30, 1986	Star Trek IV: The Voyage Home	$16,881,888	Star Trek IV: The Voyage Home had the highest weekend debut of 1986.	
49	December 7, 1986	Star Trek IV: The Voyage Home	$8,833,818		
50	December 14, 1986	The Golden Child	$11,549,711		
51	December 21, 1986	The Golden Child	$7,877,899		
52	December 28, 1986	The Golden Child	$10,118,277		

== Highest-grossing films ==
=== Calendar Gross ===
Highest-grossing films of 1986 by Calendar Gross

Rank	Title	Studio(s)	Actor(s)	Director(s)	Gross
1.	Top Gun	Paramount Pictures	Tom Cruise, Kelly McGillis, Val Kilmer, Anthony Edwards and Tom Skerritt	Tony Scott	$176,781,728
2.	Crocodile Dundee	Paramount Pictures	Paul Hogan, Linda Kozlowski, Mark Blum, David Gulpilil, Michael Lombard and John Meillon	Peter Faiman	$116,849,307
3.	The Karate Kid Part II	Columbia Pictures	Ralph Macchio, Pat Morita, Tamlyn Tomita and Yuji Okumoto	John G. Avildsen	$115,103,979
4.	Back to School	Orion Pictures	Rodney Dangerfield, Keith Gordon, Sally Kellerman, Burt Young, Terry Farrell, William Zabka, Ned Beatty, Sam Kinison, Paxton Whitehead, Robert Downey Jr., M. Emmet Walsh and Adrienne Barbeau	Alan Metter	$91,258,000
5.	Aliens	20th Century Fox	Sigourney Weaver, Michael Biehn, Paul Reiser, Carrie Henn, Bill Paxton, Jenette Goldstein and Lance Henriksen	James Cameron	$85,160,248
6.	The Color Purple	Warner Bros.	Whoopi Goldberg, Oprah Winfrey, Danny Glover, Adolph Caesar, Margaret Avery and Rae Dawn Chong	Steven Spielberg	$83,993,103
7.	Star Trek IV: The Voyage Home	Paramount Pictures	William Shatner, Leonard Nimoy, DeForest Kelley, James Doohan, George Takei, Walter Koenig, Nichelle Nichols and Catherine Hicks	Leonard Nimoy	$72,742,016
8.	Ruthless People	Buena Vista Distribution	Danny DeVito, Judge Reinhold, Helen Slater, Bette Midler, Anita Morris and Bill Pullman	Jim Abrahams, David Zucker, and Jerry Zucker	$70,788,212
9.	Out of Africa	Universal Pictures	Robert Redford, Meryl Streep and Klaus Maria Brandauer	Sydney Pollack	$70,365,426
10.	Ferris Bueller's Day Off	Paramount Pictures	Matthew Broderick, Mia Sara, Alan Ruck, Jennifer Grey, Jeffrey Jones, Cindy Pickett, Edie McClurg, Lyman Ward and Charlie Sheen	John Hughes	$70,136,369

=== In-Year Release ===
Highest-grossing films of 1986 by In-year release
Rank	Title	Distributor	Domestic gross
1.	Top Gun	Paramount	$176,781,728
2.	Crocodile Dundee	Paramount	$174,803,506
3.	Platoon	Orion	$138,530,565
4.	The Karate Kid Part II	Columbia	$115,103,979
5.	Star Trek IV: The Voyage Home	Paramount	$109,713,132
6.	Back to School	Orion	$91,258,000
7.	Aliens	20th Century Fox	$85,160,248
8.	The Golden Child	Paramount	$79,817,937
9.	Ruthless People	Disney	$71,624,879
10.	Ferris Bueller's Day Off	Paramount	$70,136,369

Highest-grossing films by MPAA rating of 1986
G	An American Tail
PG	Top Gun
PG-13	Crocodile Dundee
R	Platoon

== See also ==
- List of American films — American films by year
- Lists of box office number-one films

== Chronology ==
Preceded by 1985	1986	Succeeded by 1987
