= List of 1991 box office number-one films in the United States =

This is a list of films which have placed number one at the weekend box office in the United States during 1991.

== Number-one films ==
†	This implies the highest-grossing movie of the year.

#	Weekend end date	Film	Box office	Notes	Ref
1	January 6, 1991	Home Alone	$12,626,850	Home Alone remained number one in the new year; its 8th consecutive weekend at the top of the charts. Ties E.T. the Extra-Terrestrial for most weekends with a gross over $10 million.	
2	January 13, 1991	Home Alone	$9,813,012		
3	January 21, 1991^{4-day weekend}	Home Alone	$11,069,157	Home Alone grosses more than $10 million for a record 9th weekend, beating E.T.'s 8 weekends.	
4	January 27, 1991	Home Alone	$7,268,334		
5	February 3, 1991	Home Alone	$8,215,408	Home Alone had its 12th consecutive weekend at number one.	
6	February 10, 1991	Sleeping with the Enemy	$13,777,943	Sleeping with the Enemy broke The 'Burbs' record ($11.1 million) for highest weekend debut for February.	
7	February 18, 1991^{4-day weekend}	The Silence of the Lambs	$13,766,814	The Silence of the Lambs remained number one for five weeks, the joint most (with Home Alone) in 1991.	
8	February 24, 1991	The Silence of the Lambs	$11,947,765		
9	March 3, 1991	The Silence of the Lambs	$10,616,383		
10	March 10, 1991	The Silence of the Lambs	$8,893,306		
11	March 17, 1991	The Silence of the Lambs	$7,656,361		
12	March 24, 1991	Teenage Mutant Ninja Turtles II: The Secret of the Ooze	$20,030,473		
13	March 31, 1991	Teenage Mutant Ninja Turtles II: The Secret of the Ooze	$13,049,622		
14	April 7, 1991	Teenage Mutant Ninja Turtles II: The Secret of the Ooze	$7,812,507		
15	April 14, 1991	Out for Justice	$10,524,026		
16	April 21, 1991	Out for Justice	$7,016,331		
17	April 28, 1991	Oscar	$5,091,027		
18	May 5, 1991	Oscar	$4,164,218		
19	May 12, 1991	F/X2	$5,455,058		
20	May 19, 1991	What About Bob?	$9,216,334		
21	May 27, 1991^{4-day weekend}	Backdraft	$15,723,480		
22	June 2, 1991	Backdraft	$9,118,395		
23	June 9, 1991	City Slickers	$13,032,121		
24	June 16, 1991	Robin Hood: Prince of Thieves	$25,625,602		
25	June 23, 1991	Robin Hood: Prince of Thieves	$18,289,665		
26	June 30, 1991	The Naked Gun 2½: The Smell of Fear	$20,817,139		
27	July 7, 1991	Terminator 2: Judgment Day †	$31,765,506	Terminator 2: Judgment Day broke Beverly Hills Cop II's record ($26.3 million) for highest weekend debut for a R-rated film and Coming to America's record ($21.4 million) for the highest Fourth of July weekend debut. It had the highest weekend debut of 1991.	
28	July 14, 1991	Terminator 2: Judgment Day †	$20,738,340		
29	July 21, 1991	Terminator 2: Judgment Day †	$14,895,425		
30	July 28, 1991	Terminator 2: Judgment Day †	$11,051,400		
31	August 4, 1991	Hot Shots!	$10,848,182		
32	August 11, 1991	Hot Shots!	$8,010,411		
33	August 18, 1991	Hot Shots!	$6,330,309		
34	August 25, 1991	Hot Shots!	$4,676,467		
35	September 2, 1991^{4-day weekend}	Dead Again	$6,315,869	Dead Again reached #1 in its second weekend of release.	
36	September 8, 1991	Dead Again	$4,366,330		
37	September 15, 1991	Freddy's Dead: The Final Nightmare	$12,966,525	Freddy's Dead: The Final Nightmare broke A Nightmare on Elm Street 4: The Dream Master's record ($12.8 million) for the highest weekend debut for a slasher film and Sea of Love's record ($10 million) for the highest weekend debut in September.	
38	September 22, 1991	Freddy's Dead: The Final Nightmare	$6,626,378		
39	September 29, 1991	The Fisher King	$7,067,908	The Fisher King reached #1 after second weekend of release.	
40	October 6, 1991	The Fisher King	$6,103,250		
41	October 13, 1991	The Fisher King	$4,993,580		
42	October 20, 1991	Other People's Money	$5,012,332		
43	October 27, 1991	House Party 2	$6,027,105		
44	November 3, 1991	The People Under the Stairs	$5,522,250		
45	November 10, 1991	Curly Sue	$4,957,474	Curly Sue reached #1 in its third weekend of release.	
46	November 17, 1991	Cape Fear	$10,261,025		
47	November 24, 1991	The Addams Family	$24,203,754	In third place, Beauty and the Beast's opening ($9.6 million) broke The Land Before Time's record ($7.5 million) record for the highest weekend debut for an animated film after one weekend of limited release and The Little Mermaid's record ($6 million) for the highest weekend debut for a Walt Disney Animation Studios film.	
48	December 1, 1991	The Addams Family	$20,133,616		
49	December 8, 1991	Star Trek VI: The Undiscovered Country	$18,162,837	Star Trek VI: The Undiscovered Country broke Beverly Hills Cop's record ($15.2 million) for the highest weekend debut in December and Star Trek V: The Final Frontier's record ($17.3 million) for the highest weekend debut for a film based on a television show.	
50	December 15, 1991	Hook	$13,522,535		
51	December 22, 1991	Hook	$9,638,615		
52	December 29, 1991	Hook	$15,218,400		

== Highest-grossing films ==
=== Calendar Gross ===
Highest-grossing films of 1991 by Calendar Gross

Rank	Title	Studio(s)	Actor(s)	Director(s)	Gross
1.	Terminator 2: Judgment Day	TriStar Pictures	Arnold Schwarzenegger, Linda Hamilton, Robert Patrick, Edward Furlong and Joe Morton	James Cameron	$204,843,345
2.	Robin Hood: Prince of Thieves	Warner Bros. Pictures	Kevin Costner, Morgan Freeman, Christian Slater, Alan Rickman and Mary Elizabeth Mastrantonio	Kevin Reynolds	$164,318,602
3.	Home Alone	20th Century Fox	Macaulay Culkin, Joe Pesci, Daniel Stern, John Heard and Catherine O'Hara	Chris Columbus	$138,590,380
4.	The Silence of the Lambs	Orion Pictures	Jodie Foster, Anthony Hopkins, Scott Glenn and Ted Levine	Jonathan Demme	$129,601,403
5.	City Slickers	Columbia Pictures	Billy Crystal, Daniel Stern, Bruno Kirby, Patricia Wettig, Helen Slater and Jack Palance	Ron Underwood	$124,033,791
6.	Dances With Wolves	Orion Pictures	Kevin Costner, Mary McDonnell, Graham Greene and Rodney Grant	Kevin Costner	$121,634,934
7.	Sleeping with the Enemy	20th Century Fox	Julia Roberts, Patrick Bergin and Kevin Anderson	Joseph Ruben	$94,119,451
8.	The Addams Family	Paramount Pictures	Anjelica Huston, Raúl Juliá, Christopher Lloyd, Dan Hedaya, Judith Malina, Christina Ricci and Jimmy Workman	Barry Sonnenfeld	$90,628,410
9.	The Naked Gun 2½: The Smell of Fear	Paramount Pictures	Leslie Nielsen, Priscilla Presley, George Kennedy, O. J. Simpson and Robert Goulet	David Zucker	$86,930,411
10.	Teenage Mutant Ninja Turtles II: The Secret of the Ooze	New Line Cinema	Paige Turco, David Warner, Brian Tochi, Robbie Rist, Adam Carl and Laurie Faso	Michael Pressman	$78,656,813

=== In-Year Release ===
Highest-grossing films of 1991 by In-year release
Rank	Title	Distributor	Domestic gross
1.	Terminator 2: Judgment Day	TriStar	$204,843,345
2.	Robin Hood: Prince of Thieves	Warner Bros.	$165,493,908
3.	Beauty and the Beast	Disney	$145,863,363
4.	The Silence of the Lambs	Orion	$130,742,922
5.	City Slickers	Columbia	$124,033,791
6.	Hook	TriStar	$119,654,823
7.	The Addams Family	Paramount	$113,502,426
8.	Sleeping with the Enemy	20th Century Fox	$101,599,005
9.	Father of the Bride	Disney	$89,325,780
10.	The Naked Gun 2½: The Smell of Fear	Paramount	$86,930,411

Highest-grossing films by MPAA rating of 1991
G	Beauty and the Beast
PG	Hook
PG-13	Robin Hood: Prince of Thieves
R	Terminator 2: Judgment Day

== See also ==
- List of American films — American films by year
- Lists of box office number-one films

== Chronology ==
Preceded by 1990	1991	Succeeded by 1992
