= List of 1987 box office number-one films in the United States =

Highest grossing movies of 1987 (according to box office statistics)

This is a list of films which have placed number one at the weekend box office in the United States during 1987.

== Number-one films ==
†	This implies the highest-grossing movie of the year.

#	Weekend end date	Film	Box office	Notes	Ref
1	January 4, 1987	The Golden Child	$6,644,850		
2	January 11, 1987	The Golden Child	$4,526,427		
3	January 18, 1987	Critical Condition	$5,715,701		
4	January 25, 1987	Critical Condition	$3,335,808		
5	February 1, 1987	Platoon	$8,352,394	Platoon reached No. 1 on its seventh weekend after expanding from 214 to 590 theaters.	
6	February 8, 1987	Platoon	$8,179,149		
7	February 16, 1987^{4-day weekend}	Platoon	$12,875,690	First film to gross more than $10 million on a weekend in February. Orion Pictures' biggest weekend. Biggest 9th weekend gross of all-time.	
8	February 22, 1987	Platoon	$8,216,207		
9	March 1, 1987	A Nightmare on Elm Street 3: Dream Warriors	$8,880,555	Record opening for an independent film.	
10	March 8, 1987	Lethal Weapon	$6,829,949		
11	March 15, 1987	Lethal Weapon	$7,104,415		
12	March 22, 1987	Lethal Weapon	$6,289,750		
13	March 29, 1987	Blind Date	$7,531,273		
14	April 5, 1987	Police Academy 4: Citizens on Patrol	$8,482,487		
15	April 12, 1987	The Secret of My Success	$7,766,452		
16	April 19, 1987	The Secret of My Success	$7,412,160		
17	April 26, 1987	The Secret of My Success	$5,585,900		
18	May 3, 1987	The Secret of My Success	$4,609,670		
19	May 10, 1987	The Secret of My Success	$3,836,710		
20	May 17, 1987	Ishtar	$4,331,817		
21	May 25, 1987^{4-day weekend}	Beverly Hills Cop II †	$33,014,153	Beverly Hills Cop II had the highest weekend debut of 1987 and broke Rambo: First Blood Part II's record ($25.1 million) for highest weekend debut for a R-rated film.	
22	May 31, 1987	Beverly Hills Cop II †	$17,126,642		
23	June 7, 1987	Beverly Hills Cop II †	$12,424,035		
24	June 14, 1987	Predator	$12,031,638		
25	June 21, 1987	The Witches of Eastwick	$8,251,230	The Witches of Eastwick reached No. 1 in its second weekend of release.	
26	June 28, 1987	Dragnet	$10,542,669		
27	July 5, 1987	Dragnet	$7,042,650		
28	July 12, 1987	Revenge of the Nerds II: Nerds in Paradise	$7,900,879		
29	July 19, 1987	RoboCop	$8,008,721		
30	July 26, 1987	RoboCop	$6,332,716		
31	August 2, 1987	The Living Daylights	$11,051,284	The Living Daylights set a record 3-day opening for a James Bond film, beating that set in 1983 by Octopussy ($8.9 million) and the $10.7 million Friday to Sunday gross of A View to a Kill in 1985.	
32	August 9, 1987	The Living Daylights	$7,706,230		
33	August 16, 1987	Stakeout	$5,574,782	Stakeout reached number 1 in its second weekend of release.	
34	August 23, 1987	Stakeout	$5,559,712		
35	August 30, 1987	Stakeout	$4,729,337		
36	September 7, 1987^{4-day weekend}	Stakeout	$7,071,745		
37	September 13, 1987	Stakeout	$4,202,518		
38	September 20, 1987	Fatal Attraction	$7,602,740		
39	September 27, 1987	Fatal Attraction	$7,707,763		
40	October 4, 1987	Fatal Attraction	$9,347,602		
41	October 12, 1987^{4-day weekend}	Fatal Attraction	$10,554,336		
42	October 18, 1987	Fatal Attraction	$7,688,730		
43	October 25, 1987	Fatal Attraction	$8,046,843		
44	November 1, 1987	Fatal Attraction	$6,407,677		
45	November 8, 1987	Fatal Attraction	$7,089,680		
46	November 15, 1987	The Running Man	$8,117,465		
47	November 22, 1987	The Running Man	$5,671,255		
48	November 29, 1987	Three Men and a Baby	$10,384,392	Buena Vista's biggest opening weekend of all-time.	
49	December 6, 1987	Three Men and a Baby	$8,425,834		
50	December 13, 1987	Throw Momma from the Train	$7,318,878		
51	December 20, 1987	Eddie Murphy Raw	$9,077,324		
52	December 27, 1987	Three Men and a Baby	$10,305,227	Three Men and a Baby reclaimed #1 in its fifth weekend of release.	

== Highest-grossing films ==
=== Calendar Gross ===
Highest-grossing films of 1987 by Calendar Gross

Rank	Title	Studio(s)	Actor(s)	Director(s)	Gross
1.	Beverly Hills Cop II	Paramount Pictures	Eddie Murphy, Judge Reinhold, Jürgen Prochnow, Ronny Cox, John Ashton, Brigitte Nielsen, Allen Garfield, Dean Stockwell and Paul Reiser	Tony Scott	$153,665,036
2.	Platoon	Orion Pictures	Tom Berenger, Willem Dafoe and Charlie Sheen	Oliver Stone	$136,772,865
3.	Fatal Attraction	Paramount Pictures	Michael Douglas, Glenn Close and Anne Archer	Adrian Lyne	$125,944,573
4.	The Untouchables	Paramount Pictures	Kevin Costner, Charles Martin Smith, Andy García, Robert De Niro and Sean Connery	Brian De Palma	$76,270,454
5.	Three Men and a Baby	Walt Disney Studios	Tom Selleck, Steve Guttenberg and Ted Danson	Leonard Nimoy	$70,801,611
6.	The Secret of My Success	Universal Pictures	Michael J. Fox, Helen Slater, Richard Jordan and Margaret Whitton	Herbert Ross	$66,995,879
7.	Stakeout	Walt Disney Studios	Richard Dreyfuss, Emilio Estevez, Aidan Quinn and Madeleine Stowe	John Badham	$65,673,233
8.	Lethal Weapon	Warner Bros. Pictures	Mel Gibson, Danny Glover and Gary Busey	Richard Donner	$65,207,127
9.	The Witches of Eastwick	Warner Bros. Pictures	Jack Nicholson, Cher, Susan Sarandon, Michelle Pfeiffer and Veronica Cartwright	George Miller	$63,766,510
10.	Predator	20th Century Fox	Arnold Schwarzenegger, Carl Weathers, Elpidia Carrillo, Bill Duke, Richard Chaves and Jesse Ventura	John McTiernan	$59,735,548

=== In-Year Release ===
Highest-grossing films of 1987 by In-year release
Rank	Title	Distributor	Domestic gross
1.	Three Men and a Baby	Disney	$167,780,960
2.	Fatal Attraction	Paramount	$156,645,693
3.	Beverly Hills Cop II	Paramount	$153,665,036
4.	Good Morning, Vietnam	Disney	$123,922,370
5.	Moonstruck	Metro-Goldwyn-Mayer	$80,640,528
6.	The Untouchables	Paramount	$76,270,454
7.	The Secret of My Success	Universal	$66,995,879
8.	Stakeout	Disney	$65,673,233
9.	Lethal Weapon	Warner Bros.	$65,207,127
10.	The Witches of Eastwick	Warner Bros.	$63,766,510

Highest-grossing films by MPAA rating of 1987
G	Snow White and the Seven Dwarfs (1987 Re-issue)
PG	Three Men and a Baby
PG-13	The Secret of My Success
R	Fatal Attraction

== See also ==
- List of American films — American films by year
- Lists of box office number-one films

== Chronology ==
Preceded by 1986	1987	Succeeded by 1988
