= List of 1992 box office number-one films in the United States =

This is a list of films which have placed number one at the weekend box office in the United States during 1992.

== Number-one films ==
†	This implies the highest-grossing movie of the year.

#	Weekend end date	Film	Box office	Notes	Ref
1	January 5, 1992	Hook	$11,472,860		
2	January 12, 1992	The Hand That Rocks the Cradle	$7,675,016		
3	January 20, 1992^{4-day weekend}	The Hand That Rocks the Cradle	$11,839,246		
4	January 26, 1992	The Hand That Rocks the Cradle	$8,007,691		
5	February 2, 1992	The Hand That Rocks the Cradle	$8,120,455		
6	February 9, 1992	Medicine Man	$8,494,271		
7	February 17, 1992^{4-day weekend}	Wayne's World	$18,122,710	Wayne's World broke Sleeping with the Enemy's record ($13.7 million) for the highest weekend debut in the month of February. It remained number one for five weeks, the joint most (with Basic Instinct) in 1992.	
8	February 23, 1992	Wayne's World	$11,812,944		
9	March 1, 1992	Wayne's World	$9,641,720		
10	March 8, 1992	Wayne's World	$8,371,600		
11	March 15, 1992	Wayne's World	$8,430,398		
12	March 22, 1992	Basic Instinct	$15,129,385		
13	March 29, 1992	White Men Can't Jump	$14,711,124		
14	April 5, 1992	White Men Can't Jump	$10,188,583		
15	April 12, 1992	Sleepwalkers	$10,017,354		
16	April 19, 1992	Basic Instinct	$6,653,950	Basic Instinct reclaimed #1 in fifth weekend of release.	
17	April 26, 1992	Basic Instinct	$5,355,420		
18	May 3, 1992	Basic Instinct	$4,042,740		
19	May 10, 1992	Basic Instinct	$4,012,920	Basic Instinct was number one for the fifth weekend, joint most weeks with Wayne World in 1992.	
20	May 17, 1992	Lethal Weapon 3	$33,243,086	Lethal Weapon 3 broke Terminator 2: Judgment Day's record ($31.7 million) for highest weekend debut for a R-rated film.	
21	May 25, 1992^{4-day weekend}	Lethal Weapon 3	$27,567,462	In second place, Alien 3's opening ($23.1 million) broke Sleeping with the Enemy's record ($13.7 million) for the highest weekend debut for a film featuring a female protagonist.	
22	May 31, 1992	Lethal Weapon 3	$15,420,806		
23	June 7, 1992	Patriot Games	$18,511,191	Patriot Games broke The Hunt for Red October's record ($17.1 million) for the highest weekend debut for a spy film.	
24	June 14, 1992	Patriot Games	$11,208,134		
25	June 21, 1992	Batman Returns †	$45,687,711	Batman Returns broke Batman's records ($40.4 million) for the highest weekend debut in the month of June, for a summer release, a superhero film, a PG-13 rated film, a Warner Bros. film, and of all-time. It had the highest weekend debut of 1992.	
26	June 28, 1992	Batman Returns †	$25,425,426		
27	July 5, 1992	Batman Returns †	$13,823,658		
28	July 12, 1992	A League of Their Own	$11,660,303	A League of Their Own reached #1 in its second weekend of release.	
29	July 19, 1992	Honey, I Blew Up the Kid	$11,083,318		
30	July 26, 1992	Mo' Money	$12,385,415		
31	August 2, 1992	Death Becomes Her	$12,110,355		
32	August 9, 1992	Unforgiven	$15,018,007	Unforgiven broke A Nightmare on Elm Street 4: The Dream Master's record ($12 million) for the highest weekend debut in the month of August.	
33	August 16, 1992	Unforgiven	$11,374,018		
34	August 23, 1992	Unforgiven	$7,741,277		
35	August 30, 1992	Honeymoon in Vegas	$7,318,157		
36	September 7, 1992^{4-day weekend}	Honeymoon in Vegas	$9,170,428		
37	September 13, 1992	Sneakers	$10,031,145		
38	September 20, 1992	Sneakers	$8,112,395		
39	September 27, 1992	The Last of the Mohicans	$10,976,661		
40	October 4, 1992	The Last of the Mohicans	$9,653,376		
41	October 12, 1992^{4-day weekend}	Under Siege	$15,760,003	Under Siege broke Look Who's Talking's record ($12.1 million) for the highest weekend debut in October.	
42	October 18, 1992	Under Siege	$11,151,874		
43	October 25, 1992	Under Siege	$9,024,560		
44	November 1, 1992	Under Siege	$6,195,221		
45	November 8, 1992	Passenger 57	$10,513,925		
46	November 15, 1992	Bram Stoker's Dracula	$30,521,679	Bram Stoker's Dracula broke Back to the Future Part II's record $27.8 million for the highest weekend debut for November and Fright Night's record ($6.11 million) for highest weekend debut for a vampire film.	
47	November 22, 1992	Home Alone 2: Lost in New York	$31,126,882	Home Alone 2: Lost in New York broke Bram Stoker's Dracula's record for the highest weekend debut for November (which had been set one week earlier), Home Alone's record ($17 million) for the highest weekend debut for a Christmas-themed film and Crocodile Dundee II's record ($24 million) for the highest weekend debut for a comedy film.	
48	November 29, 1992	Home Alone 2: Lost in New York	$28,616,454	In second place, Aladdin's opening ($19.3 million) broke Beauty and the Beast's record ($9.6 million) for the highest weekend debut for an animated film and for a Walt Disney Animation Studios film.	
49	December 6, 1992	Home Alone 2: Lost in New York	$12,425,234		
50	December 13, 1992	A Few Good Men	$15,517,468		
51	December 20, 1992	A Few Good Men	$11,145,377		
52	December 27, 1992	A Few Good Men	$13,608,117		

== Highest-grossing films ==
=== Calendar Gross ===
Highest-grossing films of 1992 by Calendar Gross

Rank	Title	Studio(s)	Actor(s)	Director(s)	Gross
1.	Batman Returns	Warner Bros. Pictures	Michael Keaton, Danny DeVito, Michelle Pfeiffer, Christopher Walken, Michael Gough, Pat Hingle, Michael Murphy and Vincent Schiavelli	Tim Burton	$162,831,698
2.	Lethal Weapon 3	Warner Bros. Pictures	Mel Gibson, Danny Glover, Joe Pesci, Rene Russo and Stuart Wilson	Richard Donner	$144,731,527
3.	Sister Act	Walt Disney Studios	Whoopi Goldberg, Maggie Smith, Kathy Najimy, Wendy Makkena, Mary Wickes and Harvey Keitel	Emile Ardolino	$139,605,150
4.	Home Alone 2: Lost in New York	20th Century Fox	Macaulay Culkin, Joe Pesci, Daniel Stern, John Heard, Tim Curry, Brenda Fricker and Catherine O'Hara	Chris Columbus	$136,206,365
5.	Wayne's World	Paramount Pictures	Mike Myers, Dana Carvey, Rob Lowe and Tia Carrere	Penelope Spheeris	$120,244,016
6.	Basic Instinct	TriStar Pictures	Michael Douglas, Sharon Stone, George Dzundza, Jeanne Tripplehorn and Wayne Knight	Paul Verhoeven	$117,727,224
7.	A League of Their Own	Columbia Pictures	Tom Hanks, Geena Davis, Madonna, Lori Petty, Jon Lovitz, David Strathairn, Garry Marshall and Bill Pullman	Penny Marshall	$107,533,928
8.	Aladdin	Walt Disney Studios	voices of Scott Weinger, Robin Williams, Linda Larkin, Jonathan Freeman, Frank Welker, Gilbert Gottfried and Douglas Seale	Ron Clements and John Musker	$99,144,774
9.	The Hand That Rocks the Cradle	Walt Disney Studios	Annabella Sciorra, Rebecca De Mornay, Matt McCoy, Ernie Hudson, Julianne Moore and Madeline Zima	Curtis Hanson	$88,036,683
10.	Under Siege	Warner Bros. Pictures	Steven Seagal, Tommy Lee Jones, Gary Busey, Erika Eleniak and Colm Meaney	Andrew Davis	$83,563,139

=== In-Year Release ===
Highest-grossing films of 1992 by In-year release
Rank	Title	Distributor	Domestic gross
1.	Aladdin	Disney	$217,350,219
2.	Home Alone 2: Lost in New York	20th Century Fox	$173,585,516
3.	Batman Returns	Warner Bros.	$162,831,698
4.	Lethal Weapon 3	Warner Bros.	$144,731,527
5.	A Few Good Men	Columbia	$141,340,178
6.	Sister Act	Disney	$139,605,150
7.	The Bodyguard	Warner Bros.	$121,945,720
8.	Wayne's World	Paramount	$121,697,323
9.	Basic Instinct	TriStar	$117,727,224
10.	A League of Their Own	Columbia	$107,533,928

Highest-grossing films by MPAA rating of 1992
G	Aladdin
PG	Home Alone 2: Lost in New York
PG-13	Batman Returns
R	Lethal Weapon 3

== See also ==
- Lists of American films — American films by year
- Lists of box office number-one films

== Chronology ==
Preceded by 1991	1992	Succeeded by 1993
