= List of 1990 box office number-one films in the United States =

This is a list of films which have placed number one at the weekend box office in the United States during 1990.

== Number-one films ==
†	This indicates the highest-grossing movie of the year.

#	Weekend end date	Film	Box office	Notes	Ref
1	January 7, 1990	Born on the Fourth of July	$11,023,650	Born on the Fourth of July reached number 1 in its fourth weekend of release.	
2	January 14, 1990	Born on the Fourth of July	$8,028,075		
3	January 21, 1990	Born on the Fourth of July	$6,228,360		
4	January 28, 1990	Driving Miss Daisy	$5,705,721	Driving Miss Daisy reached number 1 in its seventh weekend of release.	
5	February 4, 1990	Driving Miss Daisy	$6,011,600		
6	February 11, 1990	Hard to Kill	$9,213,631	Highest 3-day weekend debut in the month of February.	
7	February 19, 1990^{4-day weekend}	Driving Miss Daisy	$9,834,744	Driving Miss Daisy reclaimed number 1 in its ninth weekend of release.	
8	February 25, 1990	Driving Miss Daisy	$6,107,836		
9	March 4, 1990	The Hunt for Red October	$17,161,835	The Hunt for Red October broke Police Academy 2: Their First Assignment's record ($10.7 million) for the highest weekend debut in the month of March and for the highest weekend debut for a spring release. It also broke The Living Daylights' record ($11 million) for the highest weekend debut for a spy film. It was also the biggest opener for a film outside of Thanksgiving or summer, beating Beverly Hills Cop's $15.2 million.	
10	March 11, 1990	The Hunt for Red October	$14,058,772		
11	March 18, 1990	The Hunt for Red October	$11,077,359		
12	March 25, 1990	Pretty Woman	$11,280,591		
13	April 1, 1990	Teenage Mutant Ninja Turtles	$25,398,367	Teenage Mutant Ninja Turtles broke The Hunt for Red October's record from four weeks earlier ($17.2 million) for the highest weekend debut in March, the highest weekend debut for a spring release and the biggest opening for an independent film.	
14	April 8, 1990	Teenage Mutant Ninja Turtles	$18,813,741		
15	April 15, 1990	Teenage Mutant Ninja Turtles	$14,064,921		
16	April 22, 1990	Teenage Mutant Ninja Turtles	$9,797,376		
17	April 29, 1990	Pretty Woman	$7,150,551	Pretty Woman reclaimed number 1 in its sixth weekend of release.	
18	May 6, 1990	Pretty Woman	$6,810,883		
19	May 13, 1990	Pretty Woman	$7,594,013		
20	May 20, 1990	Bird on a Wire	$15,338,160		
21	May 28, 1990^{4-day weekend}	Back to the Future Part III	$23,703,060		
22	June 3, 1990	Total Recall	$25,533,700	Total Recall had the highest weekend debut for an R-rated film and the highest debut of 1990.	
23	June 10, 1990	Another 48 Hrs.	$19,475,559		
24	June 17, 1990	Dick Tracy	$22,543,911	Included an estimated $1.5 million of t-shirt sales. Walt Disney Studios Motion Pictures' biggest opener beating Honey, I Shrunk the Kids's $14.3 million.	
25	June 24, 1990	Dick Tracy	$15,546,837		
26	July 1, 1990	Days of Thunder	$15,490,445		
27	July 8, 1990	Die Hard 2	$21,744,661		
28	July 15, 1990	Die Hard 2	$14,512,301		
29	July 22, 1990	Ghost †	$12,523,295	Ghost reached number 1 in its second weekend of release.	
30	July 29, 1990	Presumed Innocent	$11,718,981		
31	August 5, 1990	Ghost †	$10,798,834	Ghost reclaimed number 1 in fourth weekend of release.	
32	August 12, 1990	Flatliners	$10,034,685		
33	August 19, 1990	The Exorcist III	$9,312,219		
34	August 26, 1990	Darkman	$8,054,860		
35	September 3, 1990^{4-day weekend}	Ghost †	$9,953,630	Ghost reclaimed number 1 in eighth weekend of release.	
36	September 9, 1990	Ghost †	$6,510,023		
37	September 16, 1990	Postcards from the Edge	$7,871,856		
38	September 23, 1990	Goodfellas	$6,368,901		
39	September 30, 1990	Pacific Heights	$6,912,637		
40	October 8, 1990^{4-day weekend}	Marked for Death	$11,790,047		
41	October 14, 1990	Marked for Death	$7,423,949		
42	October 21, 1990	Marked for Death	$5,097,944		
43	October 28, 1990	Graveyard Shift	$5,082,300		
44	November 4, 1990	Jacob's Ladder	$7,500,760		
45	November 11, 1990	Child's Play 2	$10,718,520	Third consecutive week that a horror thriller was number one.	
46	November 18, 1990	Home Alone	$17,081,997	Biggest pre-holiday fall opening. Home Alone remained number one for 12 consecutive weekends.	
47	November 25, 1990	Home Alone	$20,987,761	Second-highest Thanksgiving weekend.	
48	December 2, 1990	Home Alone	$14,386,876		
49	December 9, 1990	Home Alone	$14,232,156		
50	December 16, 1990	Home Alone	$11,617,249		
51	December 25, 1990^{5-day weekend}	Home Alone	$15,079,919		
52	January 1, 1991^{5-day weekend}	Home Alone	$25,148,406	Highest weekend after 4 weeks of wide release.	

== Highest-grossing films ==
=== Calendar gross ===
Highest calendar gross films of 1990 in the United States
Rank	Title	Studio(s)	Actor(s)	Director(s)	Gross
1.	Ghost	Paramount Pictures	Patrick Swayze, Demi Moore, Whoopi Goldberg and Tony Goldwyn	Jerry Zucker	$205,344,137
2.	Pretty Woman	Walt Disney Studios	Richard Gere, Julia Roberts, Héctor Elizondo, Jason Alexander, Laura San Giacomo and Ralph Bellamy	Garry Marshall	$170,111,732
3.	Home Alone	20th Century Fox	Macaulay Culkin, Joe Pesci, Daniel Stern, John Heard and Catherine O'Hara	Chris Columbus	$143,592,523
4.	Teenage Mutant Ninja Turtles	New Line Cinema	Judith Hoag, Elias Koteas, Brian Tochi, Robbie Rist, Corey Feldman and Josh Pais	Steve Barron	$135,265,915
5.	The Hunt for Red October	Paramount Pictures	Sean Connery, Alec Baldwin, Scott Glenn, James Earl Jones, Sam Neill and Tim Curry	John McTiernan	$122,012,643
6.	Total Recall	TriStar Pictures	Arnold Schwarzenegger, Rachel Ticotin, Sharon Stone, Michael Ironside and Ronny Cox	Paul Verhoeven	$119,394,840
7.	Die Hard 2	20th Century Fox	Bruce Willis, Bonnie Bedelia, William Atherton, Reginald VelJohnson, Franco Nero, William Sadler, Dennis Franz and John Amos	Renny Harlin	$117,540,947
8.	Driving Miss Daisy	Warner Bros. Pictures	Morgan Freeman, Jessica Tandy, Dan Aykroyd, Patti LuPone and Esther Rolle	Bruce Beresford	$103,859,381
9.	Dick Tracy	Walt Disney Studios	Warren Beatty, Al Pacino, Madonna, Glenne Headly and Charlie Korsmo	Warren Beatty	$103,738,726
10.	Back to the Future Part III	Universal Pictures	Michael J. Fox, Christopher Lloyd, Mary Steenburgen, Thomas F. Wilson and Lea Thompson	Robert Zemeckis	$87,727,583

=== In-year release ===
Highest-grossing films of 1990 by In-year release
Rank	Title	Distributor	Domestic gross
1.	Home Alone	20th Century Fox	$285,761,243
2.	Ghost	Paramount	$217,631,306
3.	Dances with Wolves	Orion	$184,208,848
4.	Pretty Woman	Disney	$178,406,268
5.	Teenage Mutant Ninja Turtles	New Line Cinema	$135,265,915
6.	The Hunt for Red October	Paramount	$122,012,643
7.	Total Recall	TriStar	$119,394,840
8.	Die Hard 2	20th Century Fox	$117,540,947
9.	Dick Tracy	Disney	$103,738,726
10.	Kindergarten Cop	Universal	$91,457,688

Highest-grossing films by MPAA rating of 1990
G	The Jungle Book (1990 Re-issue)
PG	Home Alone
PG-13	Ghost
R	Pretty Woman

== See also ==
- List of American films – American films by year
- Lists of box office number-one films

== Chronology ==
Preceded by 1989	1990	Succeeded by 1991
