= List of 1984 box office number-one films in the United States =

This is a list of films which have placed number one at the weekend box office in the United States during 1984.

== Number-one films ==
†	This implies the highest-grossing movie of the year.

#	Weekend end date	Film	Gross	Notes	Ref
1	January 8, 1984	Terms of Endearment	$6,234,421		
2	January 15, 1984	Terms of Endearment	$5,211,394		
3	January 22, 1984	Terms of Endearment	$3,466,172		
4	January 29, 1984	Silkwood	$3,547,122	Silkwood reached #1 in its seventh weekend of release.	
5	February 5, 1984	Terms of Endearment	$3,045,877	Terms of Endearment reclaimed #1 in its eleventh weekend of release.	
6	February 12, 1984	Unfaithfully Yours	$3,774,126		
7	February 20, 1984^{4-day weekend}	Footloose	$8,556,935		
8	February 26, 1984	Footloose	$6,617,737		
9	March 4, 1984	Footloose	$6,300,641		
10	March 11, 1984	Splash	$6,174,059		
11	March 18, 1984	Splash	$6,452,183		
12	March 25, 1984	Police Academy	$8,570,007		
13	April 1, 1984	Police Academy	$8,061,398		
14	April 8, 1984	Police Academy	$7,403,955		
15	April 15, 1984	Friday the 13th: The Final Chapter	$11,183,148	Friday the 13th: The Final Chapter broke Friday the 13th Part III's record ($9,40 million) for highest weekend debut for a slasher film & its record for highest weekend debut for a film released during the Friday the 13th weekend.	
16	April 22, 1984	Police Academy	$6,101,974	Police Academy reclaimed #1 in its fifth weekend of release.	
17	April 29, 1984	Police Academy	$4,733,389		
18	May 6, 1984	Breakin'	$6,047,686		
19	May 13, 1984	The Natural	$5,088,381		
20	May 20, 1984	The Natural	$5,423,233		
21	May 28, 1984^{4-day weekend}	Indiana Jones and the Temple of Doom	$33,936,113	Indiana Jones and the Temple of Doom's Memorial Day weekend was the biggest weekend of all-time surpassing Return of the Jedi.	
22	June 3, 1984	Star Trek III: The Search for Spock	$16,673,295	Star Trek III: The Search for Spock had the highest non-holiday opening of all-time surpassing Star Trek II: The Wrath of Khan's $14.3 million.	
23	June 10, 1984	Ghostbusters †	$13,578,151	Ghostbusters had Columbia Pictures' biggest weekend of all-time, surpassing Tootsie's $11.2 million.	
24	June 17, 1984	Ghostbusters †	$15,093,905	Ghostbusters set another record for Columbia Pictures' biggest weekend of all-time.	
25	June 24, 1984	Ghostbusters †	$13,059,428		
26	July 1, 1984	Ghostbusters †	$11,148,617		
27	July 8, 1984	Ghostbusters †	$11,136,134		
28	July 15, 1984	Ghostbusters †	$9,761,392		
29	July 22, 1984	Ghostbusters †	$8,493,861		
30	July 29, 1984	Purple Rain	$7,766,201		
31	August 5, 1984	Ghostbusters †	$6,443,646	Ghostbusters reclaimed #1 in ninth weekend of release.	
32	August 12, 1984	Red Dawn	$8,230,381		
33	August 19, 1984	Tightrope	$9,156,545		
34	August 26, 1984	Tightrope	$7,198,635		
35	September 3, 1984^{4-day weekend}	Tightrope	$7,130,891		
36	September 9, 1984	Tightrope	$4,018,355		
37	September 16, 1984	Ghostbusters †	$3,457,626	Ghostbusters reclaimed #1 in its fifteenth weekend of release.	
38	September 23, 1984	All of Me	$5,803,848		
39	September 30, 1984	All of Me	$5,258,421		
40	October 8, 1984^{4-day weekend}	Teachers	$7,013,366		
41	October 14, 1984	Teachers	$4,579,286		
42	October 21, 1984	Teachers	$3,448,610		
43	October 28, 1984	The Terminator	$4,020,663		
44	November 4, 1984	The Terminator	$4,219,463		
45	November 11, 1984	Oh, God! You Devil	$5,560,001		
46	November 18, 1984	Missing in Action	$6,101,460		
47	November 25, 1984	Supergirl	$5,738,249		
48	December 2, 1984	Missing in Action	$3,021,220	Missing in Action reclaimed #1 in its third weekend of release.	
49	December 9, 1984	Beverly Hills Cop	$15,214,805	Beverly Hills Cop broke The Best Little Whorehouse in Texas's record ($11.8 million) for highest weekend debut for an R-rated film and Star Trek: The Motion Picture's record ($11.9 million) for the highest weekend debut in December.	
50	December 16, 1984	Beverly Hills Cop	$11,514,444		
51	December 25, 1984^{5-day weekend}	Beverly Hills Cop	$15,697,159		
52	January 1, 1985^{5-day weekend}	Beverly Hills Cop	$20,064,790		

== Highest-grossing films ==
=== Calendar Gross ===
Highest-grossing films of 1984 by Calendar Gross

Rank	Title	Studio(s)	Actor(s)	Director(s)	Gross
1.	Ghostbusters	Columbia Pictures	Bill Murray, Dan Aykroyd, Sigourney Weaver, Harold Ramis, Rick Moranis, Ernie Hudson, William Atherton and Annie Potts	Ivan Reitman	$220,919,997
2.	Indiana Jones and the Temple of Doom	Paramount Pictures	Harrison Ford, Kate Capshaw, Amrish Puri, Roshan Seth, Philip Stone and Ke Huy Quan	Steven Spielberg	$179,870,271
3.	Gremlins	Warner Bros. Pictures	Zach Galligan, Phoebe Cates, Hoyt Axton, Polly Holliday and Frances Lee McCain	Joe Dante	$148,168,459
4.	The Karate Kid	Columbia Pictures	Ralph Macchio, Noriyuki "Pat" Morita, Elisabeth Shue, William Zabka, Martin Kove and Randee Heller	John G. Avildsen	$90,815,558
5.	Police Academy	Warner Bros. Pictures	Steve Guttenberg, Kim Cattrall, Bubba Smith and George Gaynes	Hugh Wilson	$81,198,894
6.	Footloose	Paramount Pictures	Kevin Bacon, Lori Singer, Dianne Wiest and John Lithgow	Herbert Ross	$80,035,402
7.	Beverly Hills Cop	Paramount Pictures	Eddie Murphy, Judge Reinhold, John Ashton, Lisa Eilbacher, Steven Berkoff, Ronny Cox, Paul Reiser and Jonathan Banks	Martin Brest	$77,455,497
8.	Star Trek III: The Search for Spock	Paramount Pictures	William Shatner, DeForest Kelley, James Doohan, George Takei, Walter Koenig, Nichelle Nichols, Merritt Butrick and Christopher Lloyd	Leonard Nimoy	$76,471,046
9.	Terms of Endearment	Paramount Pictures	Shirley MacLaine, Debra Winger, Jack Nicholson, Danny DeVito, Jeff Daniels and John Lithgow	James L. Brooks	$74,420,269
10.	Romancing the Stone	20th Century Fox	Michael Douglas, Kathleen Turner, Danny DeVito, Alfonso Arau and Manuel Ojeda	Robert Zemeckis	$74,348,839

=== In-Year Release ===
Highest-grossing films of 1984 by In-year release
Rank	Title	Distributor	Domestic gross
1.	Beverly Hills Cop	Paramount	$234,760,478
2.	Ghostbusters	Columbia	$229,242,989
3.	Indiana Jones and the Temple of Doom	Paramount	$179,870,271
4.	Gremlins	Warner Bros.	$148,168,459
5.	The Karate Kid	Columbia	$90,815,558
6.	Police Academy	Warner Bros.	$81,198,894
7.	Footloose	Paramount	$80,035,402
8.	Romancing the Stone	20th Century Fox	$76,572,238
9.	Star Trek III: The Search for Spock	Paramount	$76,471,046
10.	Splash	Disney	$69,821,334

Highest-grossing films by MPAA rating of 1984
G	Pinocchio (1984 Re-issue)
PG	Indiana Jones and the Temple of Doom
PG-13	Red Dawn
R	Beverly Hills Cop

== See also ==
- List of American films — American films by year
- Lists of box office number-one films

== Chronology ==
Preceded by 1983	1984	Succeeded by 1985
