= List of 1982 box office number-one films in the United States =

This is a list of films which have placed number one at the weekend box office in the United States during 1982.

== Number-one films ==
†	This implies the highest-grossing movie of the year.

#	Week ending	Film	Gross	Notes	Ref
1	January 3, 1982	Modern Problems	$5,432,125		
2	January 10, 1982	Sharky's Machine	$2,850,839	Sharky's Machine reached #1 in its fourth weekend of release.	
3	January 17, 1982	Absence of Malice	$3,290,111	Absence of Malice reached #1 in its ninth weekend of release	
4	January 24, 1982	On Golden Pond	$3,853,902	On Golden Pond reached #1 in its eighth weekend of release.	
5	January 31, 1982	On Golden Pond	$5,008,290		
6	February 7, 1982	On Golden Pond	$4,900,463		
7	February 15, 1982^{4-day weekend}	On Golden Pond	$8,177,208		
8	February 21, 1982	On Golden Pond	$6,526,822		
9	February 28, 1982	On Golden Pond	$5,602,328		
10	March 7, 1982	On Golden Pond	$5,507,123		
11	March 14, 1982	Richard Pryor: Live on the Sunset Strip	$7,780,693		
12	March 21, 1982	Porky's	$7,623,988		
13	March 28, 1982	Porky's	$8,602,473		
14	April 4, 1982	Porky's	$8,034,766		
15	April 11, 1982	Porky's	$8,082,295		
16	April 18, 1982	Porky's	$6,511,216		
17	April 25, 1982	Porky's	$5,280,637		
18	May 2, 1982	Porky's	$4,333,570		
19	May 9, 1982	Porky's	$3,393,114		
20	May 16, 1982	Conan the Barbarian	$9,603,139	Conan the Barbarian broke Halloween II's record ($7.67 million) for highest weekend debut for a R-rated film.	
21	May 23, 1982	Conan the Barbarian	$6,874,042		
22	May 31, 1982^{4-day weekend}	Rocky III	$16,015,408	Rocky III's 4-day Memorial Day weekend was the highest weekend of all-time surpassing the $14.1 million earned by Superman II in 1981.	
23	June 6, 1982	Star Trek II: The Wrath of Khan	$14,347,221	Star Trek II: The Wrath of Khan had the highest 3-day weekend debut of all-time surpassing Superman II's $14.1 million.	
24	June 13, 1982	E.T. the Extra-Terrestrial †	$11,835,389		
25	June 20, 1982	E.T. the Extra-Terrestrial †	$12,610,610	Highest-grossing second weekend of all-time surpassing the record of $10,765,687 set last year by Superman II.	
26	June 27, 1982	E.T. the Extra-Terrestrial †	$13,729,552		
27	July 5, 1982^{4-day weekend}	E.T. the Extra-Terrestrial †	$16,706,592	Highest-grossing weekend of all-time surpassing the record set earlier in the year by Rocky III. E.T. becomes the first film to have four weekends with a gross over $10 million, surpassing the three set by Superman II the previous year.	
28	July 11, 1982	E.T. the Extra-Terrestrial †	$12,802,287		
29	July 18, 1982	E.T. the Extra-Terrestrial †	$13,003,581		
30	July 25, 1982	The Best Little Whorehouse in Texas	$11,874,268	The Best Little Whorehouse in Texas broke Conan the Barbarian's record ($9.60 million) for highest weekend debut for a R-rated film.	
31	August 1, 1982	E.T. the Extra-Terrestrial †	$10,425,071	E.T. the Extra-Terrestrial reclaimed #1 in its eighth weekend of release. It was E.T.'s eighth weekend grossing more than $10 million and the highest-grossing 8th weekend of all time.	
32	August 8, 1982	E.T. the Extra-Terrestrial †	$9,525,306		
33	August 15, 1982	Friday the 13th Part III	$9,406,522	Friday the 13th Part III broke Halloween II's record ($7.67 million) for highest weekend debut for a slasher film.	
34	August 22, 1982	E.T. the Extra-Terrestrial †	$7,684,162	E.T. the Extra-Terrestrial reclaimed #1 in its eleventh weekend of release.	
35	August 29, 1982	E.T. the Extra-Terrestrial †	$6,630,709		
36	September 6, 1982^{4-day weekend}	An Officer and a Gentleman	$7,711,202	An Officer and a Gentleman reached #1 in its sixth weekend of release.	
37	September 12, 1982	E.T. the Extra-Terrestrial †	$4,598,728	E.T. the Extra-Terrestrial reclaimed #1 in its fourteenth weekend of release.	
38	September 19, 1982	E.T. the Extra-Terrestrial †	$4,261,887		
39	September 26, 1982	Amityville II: The Possession	$4,104,277		
40	October 3, 1982	E.T. the Extra-Terrestrial †	$3,742,140	E.T. the Extra-Terrestrial reclaimed #1 in its sixteenth weekend of release.	
41	October 10, 1982	An Officer and a Gentleman	$4,509,267	An Officer and a Gentleman reclaimed #1 in its eleventh weekend of release.	
42	October 17, 1982	E.T. the Extra-Terrestrial †	$3,315,692	E.T. the Extra-Terrestrial reclaimed #1 in its eighteenth weekend of release.	
43	October 24, 1982	First Blood	$6,642,005		
44	October 31, 1982	First Blood	$4,565,972		
45	November 7, 1982	First Blood	$4,416,115		
46	November 14, 1982	Creepshow	$5,870,889		
47	November 21, 1982	The Empire Strikes Back (1982 Re-issue)	$3,949,478		
48	November 28, 1982	E.T. the Extra-Terrestrial †	$3,976,778	E.T. the Extra-Terrestrial reclaimed #1 in its twenty-fourth weekend of release.	
49	December 5, 1982	E.T. the Extra-Terrestrial †	$2,355,819	This will be the lowest grossing #1 film until Onward grosses $71,000 during the COVID-19 pandemic.	
50	December 12, 1982	The Toy	$6,322,804		
51	December 19, 1982	Tootsie	$5,540,470		
52	December 26, 1982	Tootsie	$7,469,326		
53	January 2, 1983	Tootsie	$11,222,714	Columbia Pictures' biggest weekend of all-time; their first over $10 million.	

== Highest-grossing films ==
=== Calendar Gross ===
Highest-grossing films of 1982 by Calendar Gross (Note: The chart listed on Box Office Mojo as the primary source for this chart is inaccurate as their data for the calendar year grosses for Raiders of the Lost Ark and Arthur are overstated as Box Office Mojo have recorded large grosses in early January 1982 to account for grosses that were earned in calendar year 1981 (the yearly data was adjusted to include grosses of $156 million and $77 million respectively). The chart presented here removes these films to adjust for this erroneous data recorded in the wrong year.)

Rank	Title	Studio(s)	Actor(s)	Director(s)	Gross
1.	E.T. the Extra-Terrestrial	Universal Pictures	Dee Wallace, Peter Coyote, Henry Thomas, Robert MacNaughton and Drew Barrymore	Steven Spielberg	$314,911,094
2.	Rocky III	United Artists	Sylvester Stallone, Talia Shire, Burt Young, Carl Weathers, Burgess Meredith and Mr. T	Sylvester Stallone	$124,146,897
3.	On Golden Pond	Universal Pictures	Katharine Hepburn, Henry Fonda, Jane Fonda, Doug McKeon, Dabney Coleman and William Lanteau	Mark Rydell	$118,720,608
4.	An Officer and a Gentleman	Paramount Pictures	Richard Gere, Debra Winger, David Keith, Lisa Blount, Lisa Eilbacher, Robert Loggia and Louis Gossett Jr.	Taylor Hackford	$108,402,267
5.	Porky's	20th Century Fox	Kim Cattrall, Scott Colomby, Kaki Hunter, Nancy Parsons, Alex Karras and Susan Clark	Bob Clark	$105,492,483
6.	Star Trek II: The Wrath of Khan	Paramount Pictures	William Shatner, Leonard Nimoy, DeForest Kelley, James Doohan, Walter Koenig, George Takei, Nichelle Nichols, Bibi Besch, Merritt Butrick, Paul Winfield, Kirstie Alley and Ricardo Montalbán	Nicholas Meyer	$78,912,963
7.	Poltergeist	Metro-Goldwyn-Mayer	JoBeth Williams, Craig T. Nelson and Beatrice Straight	Tobe Hooper	$73,555,425
8.	The Best Little Whorehouse in Texas	Universal Pictures	Burt Reynolds, Dolly Parton, Dom DeLuise, Charles Durning and Jim Nabors	Colin Higgins	$69,701,637
9.	Chariots of Fire	Warner Bros.	Ben Cross, Ian Charleson, Nigel Havers, Ian Holm, Alice Krige, Cheryl Campbell, Lindsay Anderson, Dennis Christopher, Nigel Davenport, Brad Davis, Peter Egan, John Gielgud and Patrick Magee	Hugh Hudson	$58,866,893
10.	Annie	Columbia Pictures	Albert Finney, Carol Burnett, Aileen Quinn, Ann Reinking, Bernadette Peters, Tim Curry, Geoffrey Holder and Edward Herrmann	John Huston	$49,411,223

=== In-Year Release ===
Highest-grossing films of 1982 by In-year release
Rank	Title	Distributor	Domestic gross
1.	E.T. the Extra-Terrestrial	Universal	$359,197,037 (Note: Amblin corrected Variety's reporting of E.T.'s gross in 1992, stating that it had grossed $367.6 million in its initial release.)
2.	Tootsie	Columbia	$177,200,000
3.	An Officer and a Gentleman	Paramount	$129,795,554
4.	Rocky III	United Artists	$124,146,897
5.	Porky's	20th Century Fox	$105,492,483
6.	Star Trek II: The Wrath of Khan	Paramount	$78,912,963
7.	48 Hrs.	Paramount	$78,868,508
8.	Poltergeist	Metro-Goldwyn-Mayer	$76,606,280
9.	The Best Little Whorehouse in Texas	Universal	$69,701,637
10.	Annie	Columbia	$57,059,003

Highest-grossing films by MPAA rating of 1982
G	Bambi (1982 re-issue)
PG	E.T. the Extra-Terrestrial
R	An Officer and a Gentleman

== See also ==
- List of American films — American films by year
- Lists of box office number-one films

== Chronology ==
Preceded by 1981	1982	Succeeded by 1983
