= List of 1983 box office number-one films in the United States =

This is a list of films which have placed number one at the weekend box office in the United States during 1983.

== Number-one films ==
†	This implies the highest-grossing movie of the year.

#	Weekend end date	Film	Gross	Notes	Ref
1	January 9, 1983	Tootsie	$10,553,448		
2	January 16, 1983	Tootsie	$9,487,210		
3	January 23, 1983	Tootsie	$8,407,104		
4	January 30, 1983	Tootsie	$7,325,537		
5	February 6, 1983	Tootsie	$6,523,267		
6	February 13, 1983	Tootsie	$4,747,425		
7	February 21, 1983^{4-day weekend}	Tootsie	$7,524,261		
8	February 27, 1983	Tootsie	$5,236,117		
9	March 6, 1983	Tootsie	$4,349,058		
10	March 13, 1983	Tootsie	$4,044,440		
11	March 20, 1983	High Road to China	$6,156,049		
12	March 27, 1983	Spring Break	$5,908,574		
13	April 3, 1983	Spring Break	$4,448,821		
14	April 10, 1983	Tootsie	$3,430,963	Tootsie reclaimed #1 in seventeenth weekend of release and became Columbia Pictures highest-grossing film in the US and Canada, surpassing Close Encounters of the Third Kind.	
15	April 17, 1983	Lone Wolf McQuade	$4,295,300		
16	April 24, 1983	Flashdance	$4,085,494	Flashdance reached No. 1 in its second weekend of release.	
17	May 1, 1983	Flashdance	$4,095,000		
18	May 8, 1983	Flashdance	$3,385,578		
19	May 15, 1983	Blue Thunder	$8,258,149		
20	May 22, 1983	Spacehunter: Adventures in the Forbidden Zone	$7,053,016		
21	May 30, 1983^{4-day weekend}	Return of the Jedi †	$30,490,619	Return of the Jedi had the highest weekend of all-time beating E.T. the Extra-Terrestrial's 4th weekend gross of $17.3 million, Rocky III's 4-day opening weekend gross of $16.0 million and Star Trek II: The Wrath of Khan's 3-day opening weekend gross of $14.3 million.	
22	June 5, 1983	Return of the Jedi †	$17,229,694	Return of the Jedi also claimed the record for highest second weekend beating E.T. the Extra-Terrestrial.	
23	June 12, 1983	Return of the Jedi †	$11,995,064		
24	June 19, 1983	Superman III	$13,352,357		
25	June 26, 1983	Return of the Jedi †	$11,127,915	Return of the Jedi reclaimed #1 in fifth weekend of release.	
26	July 4, 1983^{4-day weekend}	Return of the Jedi †	$12,038,626		
27	July 10, 1983	Return of the Jedi †	$7,337,926		
28	July 17, 1983	Staying Alive	$12,146,143		
29	July 24, 1983	Jaws 3-D	$13,422,500	Jaws 3-D broke Friday the 13th Part III's ($9.40 million) record for highest weekend debut for a 3-D film.	
30	July 31, 1983	National Lampoon's Vacation	$8,333,358		
31	August 7, 1983	National Lampoon's Vacation	$7,191,832		
32	August 14, 1983	National Lampoon's Vacation	$6,161,649		
33	August 21, 1983	Easy Money	$5,844,974		
34	August 28, 1983	Mr. Mom	$6,445,106	Mr. Mom reached No. 1 in its second weekend of release.	
35	September 5, 1983^{4-day weekend}	Mr. Mom	$8,221,715		
36	September 11, 1983	Mr. Mom	$4,686,652		
37	September 18, 1983	Mr. Mom	$3,860,064		
38	September 25, 1983	Mr. Mom	$3,207,199		
39	October 2, 1983	The Big Chill	$3,662,152		
40	October 10, 1983^{4-day weekend}	Never Say Never Again	$10,958,157	Never Say Never Again sets a record weekend debut for October over the Columbus Day weekend.	
41	October 16, 1983	Never Say Never Again	$7,233,884		
42	October 23, 1983	Never Say Never Again	$6,011,610		
43	October 30, 1983	Never Say Never Again	$3,781,141		
44	November 6, 1983	Deal of the Century	$3,520,605		
45	November 13, 1983	The Big Chill	$2,929,243	The Big Chill reclaimed #1 in seventh weekend of release.	
46	November 20, 1983	Amityville 3-D	$2,366,472		
47	November 27, 1983	A Christmas Story	$3,935,944	A Christmas Story reached No. 1 in its second weekend of release.	
48	December 4, 1983	Terms of Endearment	$3,125,453	Terms of Endearment reached No. 1 in its second weekend of release.	
49	December 11, 1983	Sudden Impact	$9,688,561		
50	December 18, 1983	Sudden Impact	$7,143,953		
51	December 26, 1983^{4-day weekend}	Sudden Impact	$5,957,766		
52	January 2, 1984^{4-day weekend}	Terms of Endearment	$9,058,537	Terms of Endearment reclaimed #1 in sixth weekend of release.	

== Highest-grossing films ==
=== Calendar Gross ===
Highest-grossing films of 1983 by Calendar Gross

Rank	Title	Studio(s)	Actor(s)	Director(s)	Gross
1.	Return of the Jedi	20th Century Fox	Mark Hamill, Harrison Ford, Carrie Fisher, Billy Dee Williams, Anthony Daniels, David Prowse, Kenny Baker, Peter Mayhew and Frank Oz	Richard Marquand	$247,371,242
2.	Tootsie	Columbia Pictures	Dustin Hoffman, Jessica Lange, Teri Garr, Dabney Coleman and Charles Durning	Sydney Pollack	$146,259,321
3.	Flashdance	Paramount Pictures	Jennifer Beals and Michael Nouri	Adrian Lyne	$92,921,203
4.	Trading Places	Paramount Pictures	Dan Aykroyd, Eddie Murphy, Ralph Bellamy, Don Ameche, Denholm Elliott and Jamie Lee Curtis	John Landis	$90,404,800
5.	WarGames	United Artists	Matthew Broderick, Dabney Coleman, John Wood and Ally Sheedy	John Badham	$79,567,667
6.	Octopussy	United Artists	Roger Moore, Maud Adams, Louis Jourdan, Kristina Wayborn, Kabir Bedi and Steven Berkoff	John Glen	$67,893,619
7.	Staying Alive	Paramount Pictures	John Travolta, Cynthia Rhodes, Finola Hughes and Steve Inwood	Sylvester Stallone	$64,892,670
8.	Risky Business	Warner Bros. Pictures	Tom Cruise and Rebecca De Mornay	Paul Brickman	$63,541,777
9.	Mr. Mom	20th Century Fox	Michael Keaton, Teri Garr, Martin Mull, Ann Jillian and Christopher Lloyd	Stan Dragoti	$63,090,965
10.	National Lampoon's Vacation	Warner Bros. Pictures	Chevy Chase, Beverly D'Angelo, Imogene Coca, Randy Quaid, John Candy and Christie Brinkley	Harold Ramis	$61,399,552

=== In-Year Release ===
Highest-grossing films of 1983 by In-year release
Rank	Title	Distributor	Domestic gross
1.	Return of the Jedi	20th Century Fox	$309,306,177
2.	Terms of Endearment	Paramount	$108,423,489
3.	Flashdance	Paramount	$92,921,203
4.	Trading Places	Paramount	$90,404,800
5.	WarGames	United Artists	$79,567,667
6.	Octopussy	United Artists	$67,893,619
7.	Sudden Impact	Warner Bros.	$67,642,693
8.	Staying Alive	Paramount	$64,892,670
9.	Mr. Mom	20th Century Fox	$64,783,827
10.	Risky Business	Warner Bros.	$63,541,777

Highest-grossing films by MPAA rating of 1983
G	Snow White and the Seven Dwarfs (1983 Re-issue)
PG	Return of the Jedi
R	Flashdance

== See also ==
- List of American films — American films by year
- Lists of box office number-one films

== Chronology ==
Preceded by 1982	1983	Succeeded by 1984
