= List of 1985 box office number-one films in the United States =

This is a list of films which have placed number one at the weekend box office in the United States during 1985.

== Number-one films ==
| † | This implies the highest-grossing movie of the year. |

| # | Weekend end date | Film | Box office | Notes | Ref |
|---|---|---|---|---|---|
| 1 | January 6, 1985 | Beverly Hills Cop | $11,515,665 | | |
| 2 | January 13, 1985 | Beverly Hills Cop | $9,616,239 | | |
| 3 | January 20, 1985 | Beverly Hills Cop | $6,475,055 | | |
| 4 | January 27, 1985 | Beverly Hills Cop | $8,216,877 | | |
| 5 | February 3, 1985 | Beverly Hills Cop | $7,143,280 | | |
| 6 | February 10, 1985 | Beverly Hills Cop | $6,026,722 | | |
| 7 | February 18, 1985^{4-day weekend} | Beverly Hills Cop | $7,770,244 | | |
| 8 | February 24, 1985 | Beverly Hills Cop | $5,857,274 | | |
| 9 | March 3, 1985 | Beverly Hills Cop | $5,114,137 | | |
| 10 | March 10, 1985 | Witness | $4,506,587 | Witness reached #1 in its fifth weekend of release after being #2 for the past four weekends. | |
| 11 | March 17, 1985 | Beverly Hills Cop | $4,614,165 | Beverly Hills Cop reclaimed #1 in fifteenth weekend of release. | |
| 12 | March 24, 1985 | Friday the 13th: A New Beginning | $8,032,883 | | |
| 13 | March 31, 1985 | Police Academy 2: Their First Assignment | $10,675,896 | Police Academy 2 had the biggest opening in March ever. | |
| 14 | April 7, 1985 | Police Academy 2: Their First Assignment | $8,608,385 | | |
| 15 | April 14, 1985 | Police Academy 2: Their First Assignment | $5,406,970 | | |
| 16 | April 21, 1985 | Police Academy 2: Their First Assignment | $4,052,568 | | |
| 17 | April 28, 1985 | Stick | $3,358,299 | | |
| 18 | May 5, 1985 | Code of Silence | $5,512,461 | | |
| 19 | May 12, 1985 | Code of Silence | $3,583,099 | | |
| 20 | May 19, 1985 | Code of Silence | $2,803,483 | | |
| 21 | May 27, 1985^{4-day weekend} | Rambo: First Blood Part II | $25,169,330 | Rambo: First Blood Part II had the highest weekend debut of 1985 and broke Beverly Hills Cop's record ($15.2 million) for highest weekend debut for a R-rated film. It was TriStar Pictures' first film to gross over $10 million in a weekend. | |
| 22 | June 2, 1985 | Rambo: First Blood Part II | $14,810,543 | | |
| 23 | June 9, 1985 | Rambo: First Blood Part II | $10,228,608 | | |
| 24 | June 16, 1985 | Rambo: First Blood Part II | $9,162,153 | | |
| 25 | June 23, 1985 | Cocoon | $7,936,427 | | |
| 26 | June 30, 1985 | Pale Rider | $9,119,111 | | |
| 27 | July 7, 1985 | Back to the Future † | $11,152,500 | | |
| 28 | July 14, 1985 | Back to the Future † | $10,555,133 | | |
| 29 | July 21, 1985 | Back to the Future † | $10,315,305 | | |
| 30 | July 28, 1985 | National Lampoon's European Vacation | $12,329,627 | National Lampoon's European Vacation broke record Police Academy 2: Their First Assignment ($10 million) for the highest weekend debut for a comedy film. | |
| 31 | August 4, 1985 | Back to the Future † | $8,428,452 | Back to the Future reclaimed #1 in its fifth weekend of release. | |
| 32 | August 11, 1985 | Back to the Future † | $8,074,395 | | |
| 33 | August 18, 1985 | Back to the Future † | $7,252,140 | | |
| 34 | August 25, 1985 | Back to the Future † | $6,927,360 | | |
| 35 | September 2, 1985^{4-day weekend} | Back to the Future † | $9,049,668 | | |
| 36 | September 8, 1985 | Back to the Future † | $5,214,465 | | |
| 37 | September 15, 1985 | Back to the Future † | $4,134,257 | | |
| 38 | September 22, 1985 | Back to the Future † | $3,924,156 | | |
| 39 | September 29, 1985 | Invasion U.S.A. | $6,891,609 | | |
| 40 | October 6, 1985 | Commando | $7,700,015 | | |
| 41 | October 14, 1985^{4-day weekend} | Commando | $6,540,130 | | |
| 42 | October 20, 1985 | Commando | $4,171,033 | | |
| 43 | October 27, 1985 | Jagged Edge | $3,216,053 | Jagged Edge reached #1 in its fourth weekend of release. | |
| 44 | November 3, 1985 | Death Wish 3 | $5,319,116 | | |
| 45 | November 10, 1985 | Death Wish 3 | $3,161,679 | | |
| 46 | November 17, 1985 | Once Bitten | $4,025,657 | | |
| 47 | November 24, 1985 | King Solomon's Mines | $5,005,788 | | |
| 48 | December 1, 1985 | Rocky IV | $19,991,537 | Rocky IV set the record opening for a three-day weekend beating Star Trek III: The Search for Spock's $16.7 million and also recorded the biggest Thanksgiving opening | |
| 49 | December 8, 1985 | Rocky IV | $11,189,102 | | |
| 50 | December 15, 1985 | Rocky IV | $7,208,991 | | |
| 51 | December 22, 1985 | Rocky IV | $8,445,197 | | |
| 52 | December 29, 1985 | Rocky IV | $10,755,123 | | |

== Highest-grossing films ==
=== Calendar Gross ===
Highest-grossing films of 1985 by Calendar Gross

| Rank | Title | Studio(s) | Actor(s) | Director(s) | Gross |
|---|---|---|---|---|---|
| 1. | Back to the Future | Universal Pictures | Michael J. Fox, Christopher Lloyd, Lea Thompson, Crispin Glover and Thomas F. Wilson | Robert Zemeckis | $190,581,407 |
| 2. | Beverly Hills Cop | Paramount Pictures | Eddie Murphy, Judge Reinhold, John Ashton, Lisa Eilbacher, Steven Berkoff, Ronny Cox, Paul Reiser and Jonathan Banks | Martin Brest | $157,304,980 |
| 3. | Rambo: First Blood Part II | TriStar Pictures | Sylvester Stallone, Richard Crenna, Charles Napier, Julia Nickson and Steven Berkoff | George P. Cosmatos | $150,415,432 |
| 4. | Rocky IV | MGM/UA Entertainment Company | Sylvester Stallone, Talia Shire, Burt Young, Carl Weathers, Brigitte Nielsen and Dolph Lundgren | Sylvester Stallone | $89,102,648 |
| 5. | Cocoon | 20th Century Fox | Don Ameche, Wilford Brimley, Hume Cronyn, Brian Dennehy, Jack Gilford, Steve Guttenberg, Maureen Stapleton, Jessica Tandy, Gwen Verdon, Herta Ware and Tahnee Welch | Ron Howard | $76,113,124 |
| 6. | Witness | Paramount Pictures | Harrison Ford, Kelly McGillis, Lukas Haas, Josef Sommer, Jan Rubes and Alexander Godunov | Peter Weir | $68,706,993 |
| 7. | The Goonies | Warner Bros. Pictures | Sean Astin, Josh Brolin, Jeff Cohen, Corey Feldman, Kerri Green, Martha Plimpton and Ke Huy Quan | Richard Donner | $61,389,680 |
| 8. | Police Academy 2: Their First Assignment | Warner Bros. Pictures | Bobcat Goldthwait, Steve Guttenberg, Bubba Smith, David Graf, Michael Winslow, Bruce Mahler, Colleen Camp, Art Metrano, Marion Ramsey, Howard Hesseman and George Gaynes | Jerry Paris | $55,600,000 |
| 9. | Fletch | Universal Pictures | Chevy Chase, Joe Don Baker, Dana Wheeler-Nicholson, Richard Libertini, Kareem Abdul-Jabbar and Tim Matheson | Michael Ritchie | $50,612,888 |
| 10. | A View to a Kill | United Artists | Roger Moore, Tanya Roberts, Grace Jones, Patrick Macnee and Christopher Walken | John Glen | $50,327,960 |

=== In-Year Release ===
Highest-grossing films of 1985 by In-year release
| Rank | Title | Distributor | Domestic gross |
|---|---|---|---|
| 1. | Back to the Future | Universal | $210,609,762 |
| 2. | Rambo: First Blood Part II | TriStar | $150,415,432 |
| 3. | Rocky IV | United Artists | $127,873,716 |
| 4. | The Color Purple | Warner Bros. | $94,175,854 |
| 5. | Out of Africa | Universal | $87,071,205 |
| 6. | Cocoon | 20th Century Fox | $76,113,124 |
| 7. | The Jewel of the Nile | 20th Century Fox | $75,973,200 |
| 8. | Witness | Paramount | $68,706,993 |
| 9. | The Goonies | Warner Bros. | $61,389,680 |
| 10. | Spies Like Us | Warner Bros. | $60,088,980 |

Highest-grossing films by MPAA rating of 1985
| G | 101 Dalmatians (1985 Re-issue) |
| PG | Back to the Future |
| PG-13 | The Color Purple |
| R | Rambo: First Blood Part II |

== See also ==
- List of American films — American films by year
- Lists of box office number-one films

== Chronology ==
| Preceded by 1984 | 1985 | Succeeded by 1986 |
