= List of American films of 2028 =

This is a list of American films that are scheduled to release in 2028.

== January–March ==
| Opening | | Title | Production company | Cast and crew | Ref. |
|---|---|---|---|---|---|
| J A N U A R Y | 14 | Grandgear | Columbia Pictures / Bad Robot | Takashi Yamazaki (director/screenplay); Sam Nivola, Nico Parker, Corey Hawkins, Paul Giamatti | |
| J A N U A R Y | 14 | Untitled Longlegs film | Paramount Pictures | Osgood Perkins (director/screenplay); Nicolas Cage, Sterling K. Brown | |
| J A N U A R Y | 21 | Viva La Madness | Black Bear Pictures | Guy Ritchie (director/screenplay); J. J. Connolly (screenplay); Jason Statham, Vinnie Jones, Jason Isaacs, Babs Olusanmokun, Camila Mendes, Ben Foster, Jonny Lee Miller, Raúl Alejandro | |
| F E B R U A R Y | 4 | Murder, She Wrote | Universal Pictures / Lord Miller / Pascal Pictures | Jason Moore (director); Lauren Schuker Blum, Rebecca Angelo (screenplay); Jamie Lee Curtis | |
| F E B R U A R Y | 4 | Heart Eyes 2 | Paramount Pictures / Spyglass Media Group / Divide/Conquer | Josh Ruben (director/screenplay); Darcy Fowler (screenplay) | |
| F E B R U A R Y | 18 | The Batman: Part II | Warner Bros. Pictures / DC Studios | Matt Reeves (director/screenplay); Mattson Tomlin (screenplay); Robert Pattinson, Jeffrey Wright, Andy Serkis, Colin Farrell, Jayme Lawson, Scarlett Johansson, Sebastian Stan, Charles Dance, Brian Tyree Henry | |
| F E B R U A R Y | 18 | Untitled Walt Disney Pictures film | Walt Disney Pictures | | |
| M A R C H | 3 | Elden Ring | A24 / DNA Films / Bandai Namco Filmworks | Alex Garland (director/screenplay); Kit Connor, Cailee Spaeny, Ben Whishaw, Nick Offerman, Tom Burke, Havana Rose Liu, Sonoya Mizuno, Emma Laird, Peter Serafinowicz, Jonathan Pryce | |
| M A R C H | 10 | Ghost Market | Walt Disney Pictures / Pixar Animation Studios | Trevor Jimenez, Jesse Andrews (directors) | |
| M A R C H | 17 | Fast Forever | Universal Pictures / Original Film / One Race Films / Seven Bucks Productions / Roth/Kirschenbaum Films | Louis Leterrier (director); Michael Lesslie (screenplay); Vin Diesel, Cody Walker, Michelle Rodriguez, Dwayne Johnson | |
| M A R C H | 17 | Oh, the Places You'll Go! | Warner Bros. Pictures / Warner Bros. Pictures Animation / Bad Robot | Jon M. Chu, Jill Culton (directors); Rob Lieber (screenplay); Ariana Grande, Josh Gad | |
| M A R C H | 31 | Tangled | Walt Disney Pictures / Burr! Productions | Michael Gracey (director); Jennifer Kaytin Robinson, Michael Montemayor (screenplay), Teagan Croft, Milo Manheim, Kathryn Hahn, Diego Luna | |

== April–June ==
| Opening | | Title | Production company | Cast and crew | Ref. |
|---|---|---|---|---|---|
| A P R I L | 7 | The Beatles – A Four-Film Cinematic Event | Columbia Pictures / Neal Street Productions / Apple Corps | Sam Mendes (director); Jez Butterworth, Peter Straughan, Jack Thorne (screenplay); Harris Dickinson, Paul Mescal, Joseph Quinn, Barry Keoghan, Saoirse Ronan, Anna Sawai, James Norton, Mia McKenna-Bruce, Aimee Lou Wood, Harry Lloyd | |
| A P R I L | 7 | Evil Dead Wrath | Warner Bros. Pictures / New Line Cinema / Screen Gems / Ghost House Pictures | Francis Galluppi (director/screenplay); Charlotte Hope, Jessica McNamee, Zach Gilford, Josh Helman | |
| A P R I L | 12 | Untitled Illumination and Nintendo film | Universal Pictures / Illumination / Nintendo | | |
| M A Y | 5 | Untitled X-Men film | Marvel Studios | Jake Schreier (director); Michael Lesslie, Joanna Calo, Lee Sung Jin (screenplay); Sadie Sink, Kit Connor, Christopher Abbott, Samara Weaving, Inde Navarrette, Maya Boyd, Adam Driver, Asa Germann | |
| M A Y | 12 | Final Destination 7 | Warner Bros. Pictures / New Line Cinema | Michiel Blanchart (director); Lori Evans Taylor (screenplay) | |
| M A Y | 12 | One Italian Summer | Paramount Pictures / Temple Hill Entertainment | Harry Bradbeer (director/screenplay); Brie Larson | |
| M A Y | 19 | Miami Vice '85 | Universal Pictures | Joseph Kosinski (director); Dan Gilroy, Eric Warren Singer (screenplay); Michael B. Jordan, Austin Butler, Alden Ehrenreich, Whitney Peak, Camila Morrone, Danny Ramirez, Edi Gathegi, Dominic Sessa, Haley Lu Richardson, André Holland, Andrew Schulz, Walton Goggins, John Leguizamo | |
| M A Y | 25 | The Resurrection of the Christ: Part Two | Lionsgate / Icon Productions | Mel Gibson (director/screenplay); Randall Wallace (screenplay); Jaakko Ohtonen, Mariela Garriga, Pier Luigi Pasino, Kasia Smutniak, Riccardo Scamarcio, Rupert Everett | |
| M A Y | 26 | Lilo & Stitch 2 | Walt Disney Pictures | Chris Sanders (director/screenplay); Maia Kealoha, Sydney Elizabeth Agudong, Billy Magnussen, Chris Sanders, Jacob Batalon, Courtney B. Vance | |
| J U N E | 2 | Untitled Days of Thunder sequel | Paramount Pictures / Jerry Bruckheimer Films / TC Productions | Jonathan Levine (director); Will Staples (screenplay); Tom Cruise, Anne Hathaway | |
| J U N E | 9 | Helldivers | Columbia Pictures / PlayStation Productions | Justin Lin (director); Gary Dauberman (screenplay); Alan Ritchson | |
| J U N E | 9 | The Mandela Catalogue | United Artists / Amblin Entertainment | Alex Kister (director/screenplay); Tyler Clifton (screenplay) | |
| J U N E | 16 | Incredibles 3 | Walt Disney Pictures / Pixar Animation Studios | Peter Sohn (director); Brad Bird (screenplay); Sarah Vowell, Holly Hunter, Craig T. Nelson, Samuel L. Jackson | |
| J U N E | 30 | Call of Duty | Paramount Pictures / Activision | Peter Berg (director/screenplay); Taylor Sheridan (screenplay) | |
| J U N E | 30 | Donkey | Universal Pictures / DreamWorks Animation | Charlie Bean (director); Eddie Murphy | |

== July–September ==
| Opening | | Title | Production company | Cast and crew | Ref. |
|---|---|---|---|---|---|
| J U L Y | 21 | Untitled Hello Kitty film | Warner Bros. Pictures / New Line Cinema / Warner Bros. Pictures Animation / Flynn Picture Company | David Derrick Jr., John Aoshima (directors); Jeff Chan (screenplay) | |
| J U L Y | 28 | Ghost Rider | Marvel Studios / 21 Laps Entertainment | Shawn Levy (director); Jonathan Tropper (screenplay); Ryan Gosling, Sacha Baron Cohen | |
| A U G U S T | 11 | The Flood | Warner Bros. Pictures / New Line Cinema / Amblin Entertainment / Vertigo Entertainment | Zach Cregger (director/screenplay); Jennifer Lawrence | |
| S E P T E M B E R | 8 | Gladys | Warner Bros. Pictures / New Line Cinema / Vertigo Entertainment | Zach Cregger, Zach Shields (screenplay); Amy Madigan | |
| S E P T E M B E R | 22 | Dynamic Duo | Warner Bros. Pictures / DC Studios / Warner Bros. Pictures Animation | Arthur Mintz (director); Scott Neustadter, Michael H. Weber (screenplay); Mason Thames, Logan Kim, Marsai Martin, Lee Pace, Steve Buscemi | |

== October–December ==
| Opening | | Title | Production company | Cast and crew | Ref. |
|---|---|---|---|---|---|
| O C T O B E R | 6 | Gremlins 3 | Warner Bros. Pictures / Amblin Entertainment / 26th Street Pictures | Chris Columbus (director/screenplay); Zach Lipovsky, Adam B. Stein (screenplay) | |
| O C T O B E R | 13 | Freddy the 13th | Paramount Pictures / Paramount Animation | Dan Trachtenberg (director) | |
| O C T O B E R | 20 | Untitled G.I. Joe film | Paramount Pictures / di Bonaventura Pictures / Hasbro Entertainment / Rough House Pictures | Danny McBride (director/screenplay); Jeff Fradley, John Carcieri (screenplay); Bradley Cooper | |
| N O V E M B E R | 3 | The Lunar Chronicles | Warner Bros. Pictures / Warner Bros. Pictures Animation / Locksmith Animation | Noëlle Raffaele (director); Lindsey Ferrentino, Kalen Egan, Travis Sentell (screenplay) | |
| N O V E M B E R | 3 | Untitled The Duffer Brothers film | Paramount Pictures / Upside Down Pictures | Matt Duffer and Ross Duffer (directors/screenplay) | |
| N O V E M B E R | 10 | Untitled Walt Disney Pictures film | Walt Disney Pictures | | |
| N O V E M B E R | 17 | Untitled Teenage Mutant Ninja Turtles film | Paramount Pictures / Nickelodeon Movies / Original Film | | |
| N O V E M B E R | 22 | Jehanne d'Arc | Warner Bros. Pictures / Bazmark Films | Baz Luhrmann (director/screenplay); Ava Pickett (screenplay); Isla Johnston | |
| N O V E M B E R | 22 | Clay | Walt Disney Pictures / Walt Disney Animation Studios | Fawn Veerasunthorn (director); Kieran Culkin | |
| D E C E M B E R | 15 | Black Panther III | Marvel Studios | Ryan Coogler (director/screenplay); David Jonsson, Letitia Wright, Winston Duke, Denzel Washington | |
| D E C E M B E R | 22 | Untitled Sonic the Hedgehog spin-off film | Paramount Pictures / Sega Sammy Group / Original Film | | |
