= List of 2023 box office number-one films in the United States =

This is a list of films which ranked number one at the weekend box office for the year 2023.

== Number-one films ==
| † | This implies the highest-grossing movie of the year. |

| # | Weekend end date | Film | Gross | Notes | Ref. |
|---|---|---|---|---|---|
| 1 | January 8, 2023 | Avatar: The Way of Water | $45,838,986 | Black Panther: Wakanda Forever and Avatar: The Way of Water became the first two films to consecutively top the box office for four consecutive weekends each since The Hunger Games: Mockingjay – Part 2 and Star Wars: The Force Awakens in 2015 and 2016. | |
| 2 | January 15, 2023 | Avatar: The Way of Water | $32,824,684 | Black Panther: Wakanda Forever and Avatar: The Way of Water became the first two films to consecutively top the box office for five consecutive weekends each since Stakeout and Fatal Attraction in 1987. | |
| 3 | January 22, 2023 | Avatar: The Way of Water | $20,133,106 | Avatar: The Way of Water became the first film since The Wretched to top the box office for six consecutive weekends. It also became the first film since Spider-Man: No Way Home to top the box office in its sixth weekend, as well as for six total weekends. During the weekend, the film surpassed $2 billion at the global box office. | |
| 4 | January 29, 2023 | Avatar: The Way of Water | $15,968,532 | Avatar: The Way of Water became the first film since Avatar to top the box office for seven consecutive weekends, as well as the first film since Spider-Man: No Way Home to top the box office in its seventh weekend. | |
| 5 | February 5, 2023 | Knock at the Cabin | $14,127,170 | | |
| 6 | February 12, 2023 | Magic Mike's Last Dance | $8,305,317 | | |
| 7 | February 19, 2023 | Ant-Man and the Wasp: Quantumania | $106,109,650 | | |
| 8 | February 26, 2023 | Ant-Man and the Wasp: Quantumania | $31,964,803 | | |
| 9 | March 5, 2023 | Creed III | $58,370,007 | Creed III broke Creed II's record ($35.2 million) for the highest weekend debut for a boxing film, as well as The Longest Yard's record ($47.6 million) for the highest weekend debut for a sports film. | |
| 10 | March 12, 2023 | Scream VI | $44,447,270 | | |
| 11 | March 19, 2023 | Shazam! Fury of the Gods | $30,111,158 | | |
| 12 | March 26, 2023 | John Wick: Chapter 4 | $73,817,950 | | |
| 13 | April 2, 2023 | Dungeons & Dragons: Honor Among Thieves | $37,205,784 | | |
| 14 | April 9, 2023 | The Super Mario Bros. Movie | $146,361,865 | The Super Mario Bros. Movie broke Sonic the Hedgehog 2's record ($72.1 million) for the highest weekend debut for a video game adaptation as well as surpassing the former's lifetime gross ($190.9 million) to become the highest grossing video game adaptation of all time at the domestic box office. It also broke The Secret Life of Pets' records ($104.3 million) for the highest weekend debuts for a non-sequel animated film and the highest weekend debut for an Illumination film. Its worldwide opening weekend ($377 million) broke Frozen II's record ($358.5 million) for the highest worldwide opening weekend for an animated film. | |
| 15 | April 16, 2023 | The Super Mario Bros. Movie | $92,347,190 | The Super Mario Bros. Movie broke Frozen II's record ($85.9 million) for the highest second weekend gross for an animated film. It also surpassed Warcraft to become the highest-grossing video game adaptation of all time at the global box office. | |
| 16 | April 23, 2023 | The Super Mario Bros. Movie | $59,930,940 | The Super Mario Bros. Movie broke Incredibles 2's record ($46.4 million) for the highest third weekend gross for an animated film. | |
| 17 | April 30, 2023 | The Super Mario Bros. Movie | $40,835,805 | The Super Mario Bros. Movie broke Incredibles 2's record ($28.4 million) for the highest fourth weekend gross for an animated film. It also became the first film since Avatar: The Way of Water to top the box office for four consecutive weekends and the first animated film to pass $1 billion at the global box office since Frozen II. | |
| 18 | May 7, 2023 | Guardians of the Galaxy Vol. 3 | $118,414,021 | | |
| 19 | May 14, 2023 | Guardians of the Galaxy Vol. 3 | $62,008,548 | | |
| 20 | May 21, 2023 | Fast X | $67,017,410 | | |
| 21 | May 28, 2023 | The Little Mermaid | $95,578,040 | | |
| 22 | June 4, 2023 | Spider-Man: Across the Spider-Verse | $120,663,589 | | |
| 23 | June 11, 2023 | Transformers: Rise of the Beasts | $61,045,464 | | |
| 24 | June 18, 2023 | The Flash | $55,043,679 | | |
| 25 | June 25, 2023 | Spider-Man: Across the Spider-Verse | $19,003,633 | Spider-Man: Across the Spider-Verse reclaimed the #1 spot in its fourth weekend of release, making it the first film since The Super Mario Bros. Movie to top the box office in its fourth weekend. | |
| 26 | July 2, 2023 | Indiana Jones and the Dial of Destiny | $60,368,101 | | |
| 27 | July 9, 2023 | Insidious: The Red Door | $33,013,036 | | |
| 28 | July 16, 2023 | Mission: Impossible – Dead Reckoning Part One | $54,688,347 | | |
| 29 | July 23, 2023 | Barbie † | $162,022,044 | Barbie broke The Hangover Part II's record ($85.9 million) for the highest weekend debut for a live-action comedy, Captain Marvel's record ($153 million) for the highest weekend debut for a female-directed film, Transformers: Revenge of the Fallen's record ($108.9 million) for highest weekend debut for a film based on a toy, and The Dark Knight Rises' record ($160.8 million) for the highest weekend debut for a non-3D film. It had the highest weekend debut of 2023. In second place, Oppenheimer's $82.4 million weekend debut broke Straight Outta Compton's record ($60.2 million) for the highest weekend debut for a biopic. | |
| 30 | July 30, 2023 | Barbie † | $93,011,602 | Barbie had the biggest second weekend for a film since Avengers: Endgame ($147.4 million). | |
| 31 | August 6, 2023 | Barbie † | $53,008,647 | | |
| 32 | August 13, 2023 | Barbie † | $33,833,294 | Barbie became the first film since The Super Mario Bros. Movie to top the box office for four consecutive weekends and the first film since Spider-Man: Across the Spider-Verse to top the box office in its fourth weekend. | |
| 33 | August 20, 2023 | Blue Beetle | $25,030,225 | During the week, Oppenheimer surpassed Sing to become the highest grossing film to never hit #1. | |
| 34 | August 27, 2023 | Gran Turismo | $17,410,552 | | |
| 35 | September 3, 2023 | The Equalizer 3 | $34,604,229 | | |
| 36 | September 10, 2023 | The Nun II | $32,603,336 | | |
| 37 | September 17, 2023 | The Nun II | $14,534,579 | During the weekend, Oppenheimer's worldwide total ($912.7 million) surpassed Bohemian Rhapsody's total ($902 million) as the all-time highest-grossing biopic film. | |
| 38 | September 24, 2023 | The Nun II | $8,550,110 | | |
| 39 | October 1, 2023 | PAW Patrol: The Mighty Movie | $22,764,354 | | |
| 40 | October 8, 2023 | The Exorcist: Believer | $26,497,600 | | |
| 41 | October 15, 2023 | Taylor Swift: The Eras Tour | $93,224,755 | Taylor Swift: The Eras Tour broke Hannah Montana and Miley Cyrus: Best of Both Worlds Concert Tour's record ($31.1 million) for the highest weekend debut for a concert film. It became the highest-grossing concert film of all time worldwide as well, breaking Justin Bieber: Never Say Never's record ($99 million). | |
| 42 | October 22, 2023 | Taylor Swift: The Eras Tour | $33,209,039 | Taylor Swift: The Eras Tour became the first concert film to top the box office for two weekends. | |
| 43 | October 29, 2023 | Five Nights at Freddy's | $80,001,720 | Simultaneously released on Peacock. Five Nights at Freddy's broke Puss in Boots' record ($34.1 million) for the highest Halloween weekend debut. | |
| 44 | November 5, 2023 | Five Nights at Freddy's | $19,001,870 | | |
| 45 | November 12, 2023 | The Marvels | $46,110,859 | | |
| 46 | November 19, 2023 | The Hunger Games: The Ballad of Songbirds & Snakes | $44,607,143 | | |
| 47 | November 26, 2023 | The Hunger Games: The Ballad of Songbirds & Snakes | $29,042,517 | | |
| 48 | December 3, 2023 | Renaissance: A Film by Beyoncé | $21,801,216 | | |
| 49 | December 10, 2023 | The Boy and the Heron | $13,011,722 | The Boy and the Heron became the first foreign language film as well as the first Japanese animated film since Dragon Ball Super: Super Hero to reach #1 at the box office. | |
| 50 | December 17, 2023 | Wonka | $39,005,800 | | |
| 51 | December 24, 2023 | Aquaman and the Lost Kingdom | $27,686,211 | | |
| 52 | December 31, 2023 | Wonka | $22,477,006 | Wonka reclaimed the #1 spot in its third weekend of release. | |

== Highest-grossing films ==
=== Calendar gross ===
Highest-grossing films of 2023 by Calendar Gross

| Rank | Title | Studio(s) | Actor(s) | Director(s) | Domestic Gross |
|---|---|---|---|---|---|
| 1. | Barbie | Warner Bros. | Margot Robbie, Ryan Gosling, America Ferrera, Kate McKinnon, Issa Rae, Rhea Perlman and Will Ferrell | Greta Gerwig | $636,225,983 |
| 2. | The Super Mario Bros. Movie | Universal | voices of Chris Pratt, Anya Taylor-Joy, Charlie Day, Jack Black, Keegan-Michael Key, Seth Rogen and Fred Armisen | Aaron Horvath and Michael Jelenic | $574,934,330 |
| 3. | Spider-Man: Across the Spider-Verse | Sony Pictures | voices of Shameik Moore, Hailee Steinfeld, Brian Tyree Henry, Lauren Vélez, Jake Johnson, Jason Schwartzman, Issa Rae, Karan Soni, Shea Whigham, Greta Lee, Daniel Kaluuya, Mahershala Ali and Oscar Isaac | Joaquim Dos Santos, Kemp Powers and Justin K. Thompson | $381,593,754 |
| 4. | Guardians of the Galaxy Vol. 3 | Walt Disney Studios | Chris Pratt, Zoe Saldaña, Dave Bautista, Karen Gillan, Pom Klementieff, Vin Diesel, Bradley Cooper, Will Poulter, Sean Gunn, Chukwudi Iwuji, Linda Cardellini, Nathan Fillion and Sylvester Stallone | James Gunn | $358,995,815 |
| 5. | Oppenheimer | Universal | Cillian Murphy, Emily Blunt, Matt Damon, Robert Downey Jr., Florence Pugh, Josh Hartnett, Casey Affleck, Rami Malek and Kenneth Branagh | Christopher Nolan | $326,101,370 |
| 6. | The Little Mermaid | Walt Disney Studios | Halle Bailey, Jonah Hauer-King, Daveed Diggs, Awkwafina, Jacob Tremblay, Noma Dumezweni, Art Malik, Javier Bardem and Melissa McCarthy | Rob Marshall | $298,172,056 |
| 7. | Avatar: The Way of Water | Disney/20th Century Studios | Sam Worthington, Zoe Saldaña, Sigourney Weaver, Stephen Lang, Kate Winslet, Joel David Moore, CCH Pounder, Giovanni Ribisi, Dileep Rao, Matt Gerald, Cliff Curtis, Edie Falco and Jemaine Clement | James Cameron | $283,067,859 |
| 8. | Ant-Man and the Wasp: Quantumania | Walt Disney Studios | Paul Rudd, Evangeline Lilly, Jonathan Majors, Kathryn Newton, David Dastmalchian, Katy O'Brian, William Jackson Harper, Bill Murray, Michelle Pfeiffer, Corey Stoll and Michael Douglas | Peyton Reed | $214,504,909 |
| 9. | John Wick: Chapter 4 | Lionsgate | Keanu Reeves, Donnie Yen, Laurence Fishburne, Bill Skarsgård, Lance Reddick, Scott Adkins, Rina Sawayama, Hiroyuki Sanada, Shamier Anderson, Clancy Brown and Ian McShane | Chad Stahelski | $187,131,806 |
| 10. | Sound of Freedom | Angel Studios | Jim Caviezel, Mira Sorvino and Bill Camp | Alejandro Monteverde | $184,177,725 |

=== In-Year Release ===
Highest-grossing films of 2023 by In-year release
| Rank | Title | Distributor | Domestic gross |
|---|---|---|---|
| 1. | Barbie | Warner Bros. | $636,236,401 |
| 2. | The Super Mario Bros. Movie | Universal | $574,934,330 |
| 3. | Spider-Man: Across the Spider-Verse | Sony | $381,593,754 |
| 4. | Guardians of the Galaxy Vol. 3 | Disney | $358,995,815 |
| 5. | Oppenheimer | Universal | $330,078,895 |
| 6. | The Little Mermaid | Disney | $298,172,056 |
| 7. | Wonka | Warner Bros. | $218,402,312 |
| 8. | Ant-Man and the Wasp: Quantumania | Disney | $214,504,909 |
| 9. | John Wick: Chapter 4 | Lionsgate | $187,131,806 |
| 10. | Sound of Freedom | Angel Studios | $184,178,046 |

Highest-grossing films by MPA rating of 2023
| G | Teddy's Christmas |
| PG | The Super Mario Bros. Movie |
| PG-13 | Barbie |
| R | Oppenheimer |

== See also ==
- Lists of American films — American films by year
- Lists of box office number-one films

== Chronology ==
| Preceded by 2022 | 2023 | Succeeded by 2024 |
