= List of 2026 box office number-one films in the United States =

This is a list of films that ranked number one at the weekend box office for the year 2026.

== Number-one films ==
#	Weekend end date	Film	Gross	Notes	Ref.
1	January 4, 2026	Avatar: Fire and Ash	$41,419,407	Avatar: Fire and Ash became the first film since Lilo & Stitch to top the box office for three consecutive weekends.	
2	January 11, 2026	Avatar: Fire and Ash	$21,502,272	Avatar: Fire and Ash became the first film since Barbie to top the box office for four consecutive weekends and the first film since Weapons to top the box office in its fourth weekend.	
3	January 18, 2026	Avatar: Fire and Ash	$14,489,184	Avatar: Fire and Ash became the first film since Avatar: The Way of Water to top the box office for five consecutive weekends and the first film since Mufasa: The Lion King to top the box office in its fifth weekend.	
4	January 25, 2026	Mercy	$10,809,178		
5	February 1, 2026	Send Help	$19,102,299		
6	February 8, 2026	Send Help	$9,046,059		
7	February 15, 2026	Wuthering Heights	$32,801,647		
8	February 22, 2026	Goat	$16,855,460	Goat reached the #1 spot in its second weekend of release.	
9	March 1, 2026	Scream 7	$63,615,172		
10	March 8, 2026	Hoppers	$45,349,901		
11	March 15, 2026	Hoppers	$28,661,727		
12	March 22, 2026	Project Hail Mary	$80,506,007	Project Hail Mary broke Creed III's record ($58.4 million) for the highest weekend debut for an Amazon MGM Studios film.	
13	March 29, 2026	Project Hail Mary	$54,537,595		
14	April 5, 2026	The Super Mario Galaxy Movie	$131,703,340		
15	April 12, 2026	The Super Mario Galaxy Movie	$68,083,645		
16	April 19, 2026	The Super Mario Galaxy Movie	$36,497,250	The Super Mario Galaxy Movie became the first film of 2026 to top the box office for three consecutive weekends.	
17	April 26, 2026	Michael	$97,206,874	Michael broke Straight Outta Compton's record ($60.2 million) for the highest weekend debut for a music biopic and Oppenheimer's record ($82.4 million) for the highest weekend debut for any biopic.	
18	May 3, 2026	The Devil Wears Prada 2	$76,747,075		
19	May 10, 2026	The Devil Wears Prada 2	$41,602,986		
20	May 17, 2026	Michael	$26,140,937	Michael reclaimed the #1 spot in its fourth weekend of release, making it the first film since Avatar: Fire and Ash to top the box office in its fourth weekend.	
21	May 24, 2026	Star Wars: The Mandalorian and Grogu	$81,670,433		
22	May 31, 2026	Backrooms	$81,402,424	Backrooms broke Civil War's record ($25.7 million) for the highest weekend debut for an A24 film. Kane Parsons (age 20) became the youngest director to have a number-one film, breaking the record previously held by John Singleton (age 25) for Poetic Justice.	
23	June 7, 2026	Scary Movie	$54,336,626	Scary Movie broke Scary Movie 4's record ($40.2 million) as the highest weekend debut both for the entire Scary Movie film series and for a parody film.	
24	June 14, 2026	Disclosure Day	$44,530,925	Disclosure Day had the highest opening weekend debut for an original film directed by Steven Spielberg not based on an existing IP. During its fifth weekend, Obsession's director Curry Barker (age 26) became the youngest filmmaker to gross over $300 million worldwide, breaking the record previously held by Spielberg (age 27), for his film Jaws, and its total domestic gross ($260 million).	
25	June 21, 2026	Toy Story 5	$159,677,837		
26	June 28, 2026	Toy Story 5	$70,829,028	During its tenth weekend, Michael's worldwide total surpassed Oppenheimer's total ($976.8 million) as the all-time highest-grossing biopic film.	
27	July 5, 2026	Minions & Monsters	$37,003,505	During its eighth weekend, Obsession's worldwide total surpassed Enter the Dragon's total ($400 million) as the highest-grossing film with a budget under $1 million.	
28	July 12, 2026	Moana	$43,142,824		
29	July 19, 2026	The Odyssey	$123,502,900		
30	July 26, 2026	The Odyssey	$90,022,510	The Odyssey's –27.1% drop broke Wicked's record (–27.9%) for the smallest second-weekend drop for any film debuting with over $100 million in its opening weekend. In third place, Hadestown: The Musical's $10.2 million opening weekend broke Hamilton's record ($10.1 million) for the highest weekend debut for a Broadway stage capture feature film.	
31	August 2, 2026	Spider-Man: Brand New Day	$360,091,572	Spider-Man: Brand New Day's $72 million gross from Thursday night preview showings broke Avengers: Endgame's record ($60 million) for the highest Thursday night gross of all-time. Its opening day gross of $169.8 million broke Avengers: Endgame's records ($157.5 million) for the highest opening day and single-day grosses of all-time. It also broke Deadpool & Wolverine's records ($211.4 million) for the highest weekend debuts in July and for a summer release, Spider-Man: No Way Home's record ($260.1 million) for the highest weekend debut for a Marvel Cinematic Universe film outside of the Avengers films, as well as Avengers: Endgame's records ($357.1 million) for the highest weekend debuts for a superhero film, a 3D film, a PG-13 rated film, and of all-time. It currently has the highest weekend debut of 2026.	
32	August 9, 2026	Spider-Man: Brand New Day	$144,254,386	Spider-Man: Brand New Day broke Suicide Squad's record ($133.6 million) for the highest weekend gross in August and had the biggest second weekend for a film since Avengers: Endgame ($147.4 million).	
33	August 16, 2026	Spider-Man: Brand New Day	$70,711,990	Spider-Man: Brand New Day became the first film since The Super Mario Galaxy Movie to top the box office for three consecutive weekends.	
34	August 23, 2026	Spider-Man: Brand New Day	$39,000,155	Spider-Man: Brand New Day became the first film since Avatar: Fire and Ash to top the box office for four consecutive weekends and the first film since Michael to top the box office in its fourth weekend. During the week, Spider-Man: Brand New Day ($863.3 million) surpassed Avengers: Endgame ($858.4 million) to become the highest grossing superhero film domestically. During its sixth weekend, The Odyssey's worldwide total ($1.452 billion) surpassed Deadpool & Wolverine's total ($1.338 billion) as the highest-grossing R-rated film of all time.	
35	August 30, 2026	Spider-Man: Brand New Day	$22,513,101	Spider-Man: Brand New Day became the first film since Avatar: Fire and Ash to top the box office in its fifth weekend, as well as for five consecutive weekends. During the week, The Odyssey became the first R-rated film in history to gross $1 billion at the international box office.	
36	September 6, 2026	Spider-Man: Brand New Day	$18,178,872	Spider-Man: Brand New Day became the first film since Avatar: The Way of Water to top the box office for six consecutive weekends and the first film since Deadpool & Wolverine to top the box office in its sixth weekend.	
37	September 13, 2026	Practical Magic 2	$30,002,526		
38	September 20, 2026	Resident Evil	$60,152,878	During the week, Spider-Man: Brand New Day's box office total surpassed Star Wars: The Force Awakens' total ($936.6 million) to become the highest-grossing film in the United States and Canada.	
39	September 27, 2026	Avengers Endgame: Encore	$26,106,643	Avengers Endgame: Encore became the first re-release since The Lion King (3D) in 2011 to top the box office.	
40	October 4, 2026	Verity	$32,031,011	During the weekend, Avengers: Endgame's worldwide box office total surpassed Avatar's total ($2.9255 billion) to become the highest-grossing film of all-time.	
41	October 11, 2026	Other Mommy	$27,805,825		
42	October 18, 2026	Street Fighter	$30,775,377	In second place, You Can See Everything's $15.6 million opening weekend was the largest debut weekend for a documentary feature since Fahrenheit 9/11 ($23.9 million) in June 2004.	
43	October 25, 2026	Clayface	$24,002,731	In second place, You Can See Everything's $19.5 million second weekend broke Fahrenheit 9/11's record ($16.3 million) for the highest second weekend gross for a documentary film.	
44	November 1, 2026	You Can See Everything	$11,445,628	You Can See Everything reached the #1 spot in its third weekend of release, making it the first documentary since Fahrenheit 9/11 to top the box office.	
45	November 8, 2026	Godzilla Minus Zero	$30,587,672	Godzilla Minus Zero broke Hero's record ($18 million) for the highest weekend debut for a live-action foreign language film.	
46	November 15, 2026	Ebenezer	$19,012,017		
47	November 22, 2026	The Hunger Games: Sunrise on the Reaping	$120,000,000		

== Highest-grossing films ==
=== In-Year Release ===
Highest-grossing films of 2026 by In-year release
Rank	Title	Distributor	Domestic gross
1.	Spider-Man: Brand New Day	Sony	$959,006,311
2.	The Odyssey	Universal	$625,595,435
3.	Toy Story 5	Disney	$480,294,461
4.	The Super Mario Galaxy Movie	Universal	$429,814,610
5.	Michael	Lionsgate	$372,303,388
6.	Project Hail Mary	MGM	$344,050,007
7.	Obsession	Focus	$263,451,715
8.	The Devil Wears Prada 2	20th Century	$220,556,651
9.	Backrooms	A24	$197,523,512
10.	Minions & Monsters	Universal	$183,171,260

Highest-grossing films by MPA rating of 2026
G	Cars (re-release)
PG	Toy Story 5
PG-13	Spider-Man: Brand New Day
R	The Odyssey

== See also ==
- Lists of American films — American films by year
- Lists of box office number-one films

== Chronology ==
Preceded by 2025	2026	Succeeded by 2027
