= List of 2025 box office number-one films in the United States =

This is a list of films that ranked number one at the weekend box office for the year 2025.

== Number-one films ==
†	This implies the highest-grossing movie of the year.

#	Weekend end date	Film	Gross	Notes	Ref.
1	January 5, 2025	Mufasa: The Lion King	$23,461,633	Mufasa: The Lion King reached the #1 spot in its third weekend of release.	
2	January 12, 2025	Den of Thieves 2: Pantera	$15,022,909	Den of Thieves 2: Pantera became the first film from Lionsgate to top the box office since The Hunger Games: The Ballad of Songbirds & Snakes in 2023.	
3	January 19, 2025	Mufasa: The Lion King	$12,055,589	Mufasa: The Lion King reclaimed the #1 spot in its fifth weekend of release, making it the first film since Deadpool & Wolverine to top the box office in its fifth weekend. Initial estimates had One of Them Days ahead of Mufasa: The Lion King.	
4	January 26, 2025	Flight Risk	$11,583,488		
5	February 2, 2025	Dog Man	$36,001,940		
6	February 9, 2025	Dog Man	$13,807,775		
7	February 16, 2025	Captain America: Brave New World	$88,842,603		
8	February 23, 2025	Captain America: Brave New World	$28,170,093		
9	March 2, 2025	Captain America: Brave New World	$14,850,888	Captain America: Brave New World became the first film of 2025 to top the box office for three consecutive weekends.	
10	March 9, 2025	Mickey 17	$19,002,852		
11	March 16, 2025	Novocaine	$8,809,436		
12	March 23, 2025	Snow White	$42,206,415		
13	March 30, 2025	A Working Man	$15,510,312		
14	April 6, 2025	A Minecraft Movie †	$162,753,003	A Minecraft Movie broke The Super Mario Bros. Movie's record ($146.4 million) for the highest weekend debut for a video game adaptation. It had the highest weekend debut of 2025.	
15	April 13, 2025	A Minecraft Movie †	$78,503,124	A Minecraft Movie had the biggest second weekend for a film since Inside Out 2 ($101.2 million). In second place, The King of Kings' $19.4 million opening weekend broke The Prince of Egypt's record ($14 million) for the highest weekend debut for an animated biblical film.	
16	April 20, 2025	Sinners	$48,007,468	Sinners had the highest opening weekend for an original film since Nope ($43.6 million) in 2022.	
17	April 27, 2025	Sinners	$45,708,664	Sinners' -5% drop broke Get Out's record (-19.5%) for the smallest second-weekend drop for a horror film. In second place, Star Wars: Episode III – Revenge of the Sith (20th Anniversary)'s $25.4 million opening weekend had the highest weekend debut for a re-release since The Lion King (in 3D) ($30.1 million) in September 2011.	
18	May 4, 2025	Thunderbolts*	$74,300,608		
19	May 11, 2025	Thunderbolts*	$32,390,811		
20	May 18, 2025	Final Destination Bloodlines	$51,600,106		
21	May 25, 2025	Lilo & Stitch	$146,016,175	Lilo & Stitch broke Top Gun: Maverick's record ($126.7 million) for the highest Memorial Day weekend debut.	
22	June 1, 2025	Lilo & Stitch	$61,808,626		
23	June 8, 2025	Lilo & Stitch	$32,362,543	Lilo & Stitch became the first film since Captain America: Brave New World to top the box office for three consecutive weekends.	
24	June 15, 2025	How to Train Your Dragon	$84,633,315		
25	June 22, 2025	How to Train Your Dragon	$36,577,190		
26	June 29, 2025	F1	$57,001,667	F1 broke Talladega Nights: The Ballad of Ricky Bobby's record ($47 million) for the highest weekend debut for a live-action motorsports film. It also broke Killers of the Flower Moon's record ($23.3 million) for the highest weekend debut for an Apple Original Film.	
27	July 6, 2025	Jurassic World Rebirth	$92,016,065		
28	July 13, 2025	Superman	$125,021,735		
29	July 20, 2025	Superman	$58,450,094		
30	July 27, 2025	The Fantastic Four: First Steps	$117,644,828		
31	August 3, 2025	The Fantastic Four: First Steps	$38,695,752		
32	August 10, 2025	Weapons	$43,501,217		
33	August 17, 2025	Weapons	$24,457,003		
34	August 24, 2025	KPop Demon Hunters	$19,200,000	KPop Demon Hunters became the first film from Netflix to top the box office.	
35	August 31, 2025	Weapons	$10,471,712	Weapons reclaimed the #1 spot in its fourth weekend of release, making it the first film since Wonka to top the box office in its fourth weekend and for three nonconsecutive weekends.	
36	September 7, 2025	The Conjuring: Last Rites	$84,006,121	In second place, Hamilton's $10.1 million opening weekend broke Newsies: The Broadway Musical's weekend debut ($1.3 million) for the highest weekend debut for a Broadway stage capture feature film.	
37	September 14, 2025	Demon Slayer: Kimetsu no Yaiba – The Movie: Infinity Castle	$70,611,098	Demon Slayer: Kimetsu no Yaiba – The Movie: Infinity Castle broke Pokémon: The First Movie's record ($31 million) for the highest weekend debut for an anime film as well as Demon Slayer: Kimetsu no Yaiba – The Movie: Mugen Train's record ($21.1 million) for the highest weekend debut for a foreign language film.	
38	September 21, 2025	Demon Slayer: Kimetsu no Yaiba – The Movie: Infinity Castle	$17,303,707		
39	September 28, 2025	One Battle After Another	$22,000,387		
40	October 5, 2025	Taylor Swift: The Official Release Party of a Showgirl	$34,062,774		
41	October 12, 2025	Tron: Ares	$33,241,433		
42	October 19, 2025	Black Phone 2	$27,332,040		
43	October 26, 2025	Chainsaw Man – The Movie: Reze Arc	$18,030,883		
44	November 2, 2025	Black Phone 2	$8,323,210	Black Phone 2 reclaimed the #1 spot in its third weekend of release. Initial estimates had Regretting You ahead of Black Phone 2.	
45	November 9, 2025	Predator: Badlands	$40,016,853		
46	November 16, 2025	Now You See Me: Now You Don't	$21,013,793		
47	November 23, 2025	Wicked: For Good	$147,004,640	Wicked: For Good broke Wicked's record ($112.5 million) for the highest weekend debut for a film based on a Broadway musical.	
48	November 30, 2025	Zootopia 2	$100,262,540	Zootopia 2's worldwide opening weekend ($560.3 million) broke Moana 2's record ($386.3 million) for the highest worldwide opening weekend for an animated film. Wicked: For Good and Zootopia 2 became the first two films since Wicked and Moana 2 in 2024 to bring in over $100 million over two consecutive weekends.	
49	December 7, 2025	Five Nights at Freddy's 2	$64,007,430		
50	December 14, 2025	Zootopia 2	$25,880,118	Zootopia 2 reclaimed the #1 spot in its third weekend of release. It also broke Inside Out 2's record (19 days) for the fastest animated film to reach $1 billion worldwide, doing so in 17 days.	
51	December 21, 2025	Avatar: Fire and Ash	$89,160,860	In second place, David's $22 million opening weekend broke The King of Kings' record ($19.4 million) for the highest weekend debut for an animated biblical film.	
52	December 28, 2025	Avatar: Fire and Ash	$63,087,667		

== Highest-grossing films ==
=== Calendar gross ===
Highest-grossing films of 2025 by Calendar Gross

Rank	Title	Studio(s)	Actor(s)	Director(s)	Domestic Gross
1.	A Minecraft Movie	Warner Bros.	Jason Momoa, Jack Black, Emma Myers, Danielle Brooks, Sebastian Hansen, and Jennifer Coolidge	Jared Hess	$423,949,195
2.	Lilo & Stitch	Disney	Sydney Elizebeth Agudong, Billy Magnussen, Hannah Waddingham, Chris Sanders, Courtney B. Vance, Zach Galifianakis, and Maia Kealoha	Dean Fleischer Camp	$423,778,855
3.	Superman	Warner Bros.	David Corenswet, Rachel Brosnahan, Nicholas Hoult, Edi Gathegi, Anthony Carrigan, Nathan Fillion, and Isabela Merced	James Gunn	$354,184,465
4.	Jurassic World Rebirth	Universal	Scarlett Johansson, Mahershala Ali, Jonathan Bailey, Rupert Friend, Manuel Garcia-Rulfo, and Ed Skrein	Gareth Edwards	$339,640,400
5.	Zootopia 2	Disney	voices of Ginnifer Goodwin, Jason Bateman, Shakira, Idris Elba, Alan Tudyk, Nate Torrence, Don Lake, Bonnie Hunt, Jenny Slate, Ke Huy Quan, Fortune Feimster, Andy Samberg, David Strathairn, Patrick Warburton, Quinta Brunson, and Danny Trejo	Jared Bush, Byron Howard	$337,903,155
6.	Wicked: For Good	Universal	Ariana Grande, Cynthia Erivo, Jonathan Bailey, Ethan Slater, Bowen Yang, Michelle Yeoh, and Jeff Goldblum	Jon M. Chu	$335,438,675
7.	Sinners	Warner Bros.	Michael B. Jordan, Hailee Steinfeld, Miles Caton, Jack O'Connell, Wunmi Mosaku, Jayme Lawson, Omar Miller, and Delroy Lindo	Ryan Coogler	$279,653,537
8.	The Fantastic Four: First Steps	Disney	Pedro Pascal, Vanessa Kirby, Ebon Moss-Bachrach, Joseph Quinn, Julia Garner, Sarah Niles, Mark Gatiss, Natasha Lyonne, Paul Walter Hauser, and Ralph Ineson	Matt Shakman	$274,286,610
9.	How to Train Your Dragon	Universal	Mason Thames, Nico Parker, Gabriel Howell, Julian Dennison, Bronwyn James, Harry Trevaldwyn, Peter Serafinowicz, Ruth Codd, Naomi Wirthner, Nick Frost, and Gerard Butler	Dean DeBlois	$262,958,100
10.	Avatar: Fire and Ash	20th Century	Sam Worthington, Zoe Saldaña, Sigourney Weaver, Stephen Lang, and Kate Winslet	James Cameron	$250,353,869

=== In-Year Release ===
Highest-grossing films of 2025 by In-year release
Rank	Title	Distributor	Domestic gross
1.	Zootopia 2	Disney	$428,130,160
2.	A Minecraft Movie	Warner Bros.	$424,087,780
3.	Lilo & Stitch	Disney	$423,778,855
4.	Avatar: Fire and Ash	20th Century	$404,340,010
5.	Superman	Warner Bros.	$354,184,465
6.	Wicked: For Good	Universal	$342,915,090
7.	Jurassic World Rebirth	Universal	$339,640,400
8.	Sinners	Warner Bros.	$279,653,537
9.	The Fantastic Four: First Steps	Disney	$274,286,610
10.	How to Train Your Dragon	Universal	$262,958,100

Highest-grossing films by MPA rating of 2025
G	Gabby's Dollhouse: The Movie
PG	Zootopia 2
PG-13	Avatar: Fire and Ash
R	Sinners

== See also ==
- Lists of American films — American films by year
- Lists of box office number-one films

== Chronology ==
Preceded by 2024	2025	Succeeded by 2026
