= List of 2017 box office number-one films in the United States =

This is a list of films which placed number one at the weekend box office for the year 2017.

== Number-one films ==
†	This implies the highest-grossing movie of the year.

#	Weekend end date	Film	Gross	Notes	Ref
1	January 8, 2017	Hidden Figures	$22,800,057	Hidden Figures reached #1 after two weekends of limited release. Initial estimates had Rogue One: A Star Wars Story ahead of Hidden Figures.	
2	January 15, 2017	Hidden Figures	$20,853,947	Hidden Figures became the first film since Star Wars: The Force Awakens to hold the top spot in its fourth weekend of release.	
3	January 22, 2017	Split	$40,010,975	During the weekend, Sing passed My Big Fat Greek Wedding to become the highest-grossing film to never hit #1.	
4	January 29, 2017	Split	$25,655,440		
5	February 5, 2017	Split	$14,424,195	Split became the first film of 2017 to be #1 three consecutive weekends.	
6	February 12, 2017	The Lego Batman Movie	$53,003,468		
7	February 19, 2017	The Lego Batman Movie	$32,655,114		
8	February 26, 2017	Get Out	$33,377,060		
9	March 5, 2017	Logan	$88,411,916	Logan broke 300's record ($70.8 million) for the highest grossing opening weekend in March for an R-rated film.	
10	March 12, 2017	Kong: Skull Island	$61,025,472		
11	March 19, 2017	Beauty and the Beast	$174,750,616	Beauty and the Beast broke Batman v Superman: Dawn of Justice's records ($166 million) for the highest weekend debuts in March and for a spring release, The Lorax's record ($70.4 million) for a musical film, Pitch Perfect 2's record ($69.2 million) for the highest weekend debut for a live-action musical film, Finding Dory's record ($135.1 million) for the highest weekend debut for a PG-rated film, Harry Potter and the Deathly Hallows – Part 2's record ($169.2 million) for the highest weekend debut for a live-action fantasy film, and The Hunger Games: Catching Fire's record ($158.1 million) for the highest weekend debut for a film with a female protagonist.	
12	March 26, 2017	Beauty and the Beast	$90,426,717		
13	April 2, 2017	The Boss Baby	$50,198,902		
14	April 9, 2017	The Boss Baby	$26,363,488		
15	April 16, 2017	The Fate of the Furious	$98,786,705	The Fate of the Furious' $532.5 million worldwide opening broke Star Wars: The Force Awakens' record ($529 million) for the highest worldwide opening weekend of all time.	
16	April 23, 2017	The Fate of the Furious	$38,408,415		
17	April 30, 2017	The Fate of the Furious	$19,936,540		
18	May 7, 2017	Guardians of the Galaxy Vol. 2	$146,510,104		
19	May 14, 2017	Guardians of the Galaxy Vol. 2	$65,263,492		
20	May 21, 2017	Alien: Covenant	$36,160,621		
21	May 28, 2017	Pirates of the Caribbean: Dead Men Tell No Tales	$62,983,253		
22	June 4, 2017	Wonder Woman	$103,251,471	Wonder Woman broke Fifty Shades of Grey's record ($85.1 million) for the highest weekend debut for a female directed film.	
23	June 11, 2017	Wonder Woman	$58,520,672		
24	June 18, 2017	Cars 3	$53,688,680		
25	June 25, 2017	Transformers: The Last Knight	$44,680,073		
26	July 2, 2017	Despicable Me 3	$72,414,390	Despicable Me 3 had the widest release ever at 4529 locations, overtaking the 4468 locations of The Twilight Saga: Eclipse.	
27	July 9, 2017	Spider-Man: Homecoming	$117,027,503	In second place, Despicable Me 3 increased to 4535 locations, breaking its record from the previous week.	
28	July 16, 2017	War for the Planet of the Apes	$56,262,929		
29	July 23, 2017	Dunkirk	$50,513,488		
30	July 30, 2017	Dunkirk	$26,611,130		
31	August 6, 2017	The Dark Tower	$19,153,698		
32	August 13, 2017	Annabelle: Creation	$35,006,404		
33	August 20, 2017	The Hitman's Bodyguard	$21,384,504	During the weekend, Wonder Woman passed Spider-Man ($403.7 million) as the highest grossing superhero origin film of all time.	
34	August 27, 2017	The Hitman's Bodyguard	$10,262,619		
35	September 3, 2017	The Hitman's Bodyguard	$10,536,010		
36	September 10, 2017	It	$123,403,419	It's $13.5 million Thursday night gross broke Paranormal Activity 3's record ($8 million) for the highest Thursday night gross for an R-rated horror film and Deadpool's record ($12.7 million) for the highest Thursday night gross for an R-rated film. It also broke Hotel Transylvania 2's record ($48.5 million) for the highest weekend debut in September, Paranormal Activity 3's record ($52.5 million) for the highest weekend debut for a horror film, and Gravity's record ($55.8 million) for the highest weekend debut for a fall release.	
37	September 17, 2017	It	$60,103,110		
38	September 24, 2017	Kingsman: The Golden Circle	$39,023,010		
39	October 1, 2017	Kingsman: The Golden Circle	$16,935,675	Initial estimates had It ahead of Kingsman: The Golden Circle. During the week, It passed The Exorcist ($232.9 million) as the highest grossing horror film of all time.	
40	October 8, 2017	Blade Runner 2049	$32,753,122	Ninth straight week for an R-Rated film in the #1 Spot (Annabelle: Creation, The Hitman's Bodyguard, It, Kingsman: The Golden Circle). This previously occurred with Stakeout and Fatal Attraction in 1987.	
41	October 15, 2017	Happy Death Day	$26,039,025		
42	October 22, 2017	Boo 2! A Madea Halloween	$21,226,953		
43	October 29, 2017	Jigsaw	$16,640,452		
44	November 5, 2017	Thor: Ragnarok	$122,744,989		
45	November 12, 2017	Thor: Ragnarok	$57,078,306		
46	November 19, 2017	Justice League	$93,842,239		
47	November 26, 2017	Coco	$50,802,605		
48	December 3, 2017	Coco	$27,533,304		
49	December 10, 2017	Coco	$18,452,315	Coco became the first animated film since Moana to top the box office for three consecutive weekends.	
50	December 17, 2017	Star Wars: The Last Jedi †	$220,009,584	Star Wars: The Last Jedi had the highest weekend debut of 2017 and became the widest release in the month of December, beating Star Wars: The Force Awakens. Star Wars: The Last Jedi grossed $104.7 million in its opening day, becoming only the second film (along with Star Wars: The Force Awakens) to gross more than $100 million in a single day, and making the Star Wars franchise the first film series to include two films that recorded $100 million grossing days.	
51	December 24, 2017	Star Wars: The Last Jedi †	$71,565,498		
52	December 31, 2017	Star Wars: The Last Jedi †	$52,520,140	Coco and Star Wars: The Last Jedi became the first two films to top the box office for at least three consecutive weekends since Moana and Rogue One: A Star Wars Story in 2016. On December 30, Star Wars: The Last Jedi surpassed a billion dollars at the global box office, making Star Wars the first franchise to release three consecutive billion-dollar-grossing films and the first franchise to release billion-dollar-grossing films in three consecutive years (along with 2015's Star Wars: The Force Awakens and 2016's Rogue One: A Star Wars Story).	

== Highest-grossing films ==
=== Calendar Gross ===
Highest-grossing films of 2017 by Calendar Gross

Rank	Title	Studio(s)	Actor(s)	Director(s)	Gross
1.	Star Wars: The Last Jedi	Walt Disney Studios	Mark Hamill, Carrie Fisher, Adam Driver, Daisy Ridley, John Boyega, Oscar Isaac, Andy Serkis, Lupita Nyong'o, Domhnall Gleeson, Anthony Daniels, Gwendoline Christie, Kelly Marie Tran, Laura Dern, Frank Oz and Benicio del Toro	Rian Johnson	$517,218,368
2.	Beauty and the Beast	Walt Disney Studios	Emma Watson, Dan Stevens, Luke Evans, Kevin Kline, Josh Gad, Ewan McGregor, Stanley Tucci, Audra McDonald, Gugu Mbatha-Raw, Ian McKellen and Emma Thompson	Bill Condon	$504,014,165
3.	Wonder Woman	Warner Bros. Pictures	Gal Gadot, Chris Pine, Robin Wright, Danny Huston, David Thewlis, Connie Nielsen and Elena Anaya	Patty Jenkins	$412,563,408
4.	Guardians of the Galaxy Vol. 2	Walt Disney Studios	Chris Pratt, Zoe Saldaña, Dave Bautista, Vin Diesel, Bradley Cooper, Michael Rooker, Karen Gillan, Pom Klementieff, Elizabeth Debicki, Chris Sullivan, Sean Gunn, Sylvester Stallone and Kurt Russell	James Gunn	$389,813,101
5.	Spider-Man: Homecoming	Sony Pictures	Tom Holland, Michael Keaton, Jon Favreau, Zendaya, Donald Glover, Jacob Batalon, Laura Harrier, Tony Revolori, Bokeem Woodbine, Tyne Daly, Marisa Tomei and Robert Downey Jr.	Jon Watts	$334,201,140
6.	It	Warner Bros. Pictures	Jaeden Lieberher and Bill Skarsgård	Andy Muschietti	$327,481,748
7.	Thor: Ragnarok	Walt Disney Studios	Chris Hemsworth, Tom Hiddleston, Cate Blanchett, Idris Elba, Jeff Goldblum, Tessa Thompson, Karl Urban, Mark Ruffalo and Anthony Hopkins	Taika Waititi	$311,225,150
8.	Despicable Me 3	Universal Pictures	voices of Steve Carell, Kristen Wiig, Trey Parker, Pierre Coffin, Miranda Cosgrove, Steve Coogan, Jenny Slate, Dana Gaier and Julie Andrews	Pierre Coffin and Kyle Balda	$264,624,300
9.	Logan	20th Century Fox	Hugh Jackman, Patrick Stewart, Richard E. Grant, Boyd Holbrook, Stephen Merchant and Dafne Keen	James Mangold	$226,258,569
10.	The Fate of the Furious	Universal Pictures	Vin Diesel, Dwayne Johnson, Jason Statham, Michelle Rodriguez, Tyrese Gibson, Chris "Ludacris" Bridges, Scott Eastwood, Nathalie Emmanuel, Elsa Pataky, Kurt Russell and Charlize Theron	F. Gary Gray	$225,764,765

=== In-Year Release ===
Highest-grossing films of 2017 by In-year release
Rank	Title	Distributor	Domestic gross
1.	Star Wars: The Last Jedi	Disney	$620,181,382
2.	Beauty and the Beast	Disney	$504,014,165
3.	Wonder Woman	Warner Bros.	$412,563,408
4.	Jumanji: Welcome to the Jungle	Sony	$404,172,864
5.	Guardians of the Galaxy Vol. 2	Disney	$389,813,101
6.	Spider-Man: Homecoming	Sony	$334,201,140
7.	It	Warner Bros.	$327,382,162
8.	Thor: Ragnarok	Disney	$315,058,289
9.	Despicable Me 3	Universal	$264,624,300
10.	Justice League	Warner Bros.	$229,024,295

Highest-grossing films by MPAA rating of 2017
G	Cars 3
PG	Beauty and the Beast
PG-13	Star Wars: The Last Jedi
R	It

== See also ==
- List of American films — American films by year
- Lists of box office number-one films

== Chronology ==
Preceded by 2016	2017	Succeeded by 2018
