= List of 2020 box office number-one films in the United States =

This is a list of films which placed number one at the weekend box office for the year 2020.

The year was severely impacted by the COVID-19 pandemic. The vast majority of theaters around the country closed in March, and grosses plummeted. Many number one films during the height of the closures were independent films with limited releases, and films were primarily viewed through drive-in theaters. Total grosses from all movies combined in 2020 generated $2.28 billion in the United States, an 80% decline from 2019's $11.4 billion.

== Number-one films ==
†	This implies the highest-grossing movie of the year.

#	Weekend end date	Film	Gross	Notes	Refs
1	January 5, 2020	Star Wars: The Rise of Skywalker	$34,524,815		
2	January 12, 2020	1917	$37,000,200	1917 reached the #1 spot after two weeks of limited release.	
3	January 19, 2020	Bad Boys for Life †	$62,504,105	Bad Boys for Life had the highest weekend debut of 2020. This would remain the highest weekly total until the week ending on June 27, 2021, which saw F9 debut to $70,043,165.	
4	January 26, 2020	Bad Boys for Life †	$34,011,714		
5	February 2, 2020	Bad Boys for Life †	$17,682,959	Bad Boys for Life became the first film in 2020 to top the box office for three consecutive weekends.	
6	February 9, 2020	Birds of Prey	$33,010,017		
7	February 16, 2020	Sonic the Hedgehog	$58,018,348	Sonic the Hedgehog broke Detective Pikachu's record ($54.4 million) for the highest weekend debut for a video game adaptation.	
8	February 23, 2020	Sonic the Hedgehog	$26,192,294		
9	March 1, 2020	The Invisible Man	$28,205,665		
10	March 8, 2020	Onward	$39,119,861		
11	March 15, 2020	Onward	$10,601,952	During the week, Sonic the Hedgehog ($145.0 million) broke Detective Pikachu's record ($144.1 million) for the highest grossing video game adaptation domestically.	
12–33	March 22, 2020–August 16, 2020	These are weekends for which most box office reporting was suspended due to the COVID-19 pandemic following the closure of theaters			
34	August 23, 2020	Unhinged	$4,000,761	Unhinged reached number one in its second weekend of release (and first in American theaters). It was the first wide release film since March.	
35	August 30, 2020	The New Mutants	$7,037,017		
36	September 6, 2020	Tenet	$9,353,090	With 65% of theaters in the country open, Tenet reached number one, and was highest-grossing weekend for a film since March.	
37	September 13, 2020	Tenet	$6,603,467		
38	September 20, 2020	Tenet	$4,568,470		
39	September 27, 2020	Tenet	$3,348,340		
40	October 4, 2020	Tenet	$2,664,202		
41	October 11, 2020	The War with Grandpa	$3,623,880		
42	October 18, 2020	Honest Thief	$4,115,249		
43	October 25, 2020	Honest Thief	$2,354,022		
44	November 1, 2020	Come Play	$3,119,875		
45	November 8, 2020	Let Him Go	$4,000,470		
46	November 15, 2020	Freaky	$3,600,355		
47	November 22, 2020	Freaky	$1,281,150		
48	November 29, 2020	The Croods: A New Age	$9,724,200		
49	December 6, 2020	The Croods: A New Age	$4,439,855		
50	December 13, 2020	The Croods: A New Age	$3,060,535		
51	December 20, 2020	Monster Hunter	$2,201,269		
52	December 27, 2020	Wonder Woman 1984	$16,701,957	Simultaneously released on HBO Max. First week above 10 million since March.	

== Highest-grossing films ==
=== Calendar Gross ===
Highest-grossing films of 2020 by Calendar Gross

Rank	Title	Studio(s)	Actor(s)	Director(s)	Domestic Gross
1.	Bad Boys for Life	Sony Pictures	Will Smith, Martin Lawrence, Vanessa Hudgens, Alexander Ludwig, Charles Melton, Paola Núñez, Kate del Castillo, Nicky Jam and Joe Pantoliano	Adil El Arbi and Bilall Fallah	$204,417,855
2.	1917	Universal Pictures	George MacKay, Dean-Charles Chapman, Mark Strong, Andrew Scott, Richard Madden, Claire Duburcq, Colin Firth and Benedict Cumberbatch	Sam Mendes	$157,901,466
3.	Sonic the Hedgehog	Paramount Pictures	James Marsden, Ben Schwartz, Tika Sumpter, Jim Carrey, Lee Majdoub, Adam Pally, Frank C. Turner, Tom Butler and Natasha Rothwell	Jeff Fowler	$146,066,470
4.	Jumanji: The Next Level	Sony Pictures	Dwayne Johnson, Jack Black, Kevin Hart, Karen Gillan, Nick Jonas, Awkwafina, Alex Wolff, Morgan Turner, Ser'Darius Blain, Madison Iseman, Danny Glover and Danny DeVito	Jake Kasdan	$124,736,710
5.	Star Wars: The Rise of Skywalker	Walt Disney Studios	Carrie Fisher, Mark Hamill, Adam Driver, Daisy Ridley, John Boyega, Oscar Isaac, Anthony Daniels, Naomi Ackie, Domhnall Gleeson, Richard E. Grant, Lupita Nyong'o, Keri Russell, Joonas Suotamo, Kelly Marie Tran, Ian McDiarmid and Billy Dee Williams	J. J. Abrams	$124,496,308
6.	Birds of Prey	Warner Bros. Pictures	Margot Robbie, Mary Elizabeth Winstead, Jurnee Smollett-Bell, Rosie Perez, Chris Messina, Ella Jay Basco, Ali Wong and Ewan McGregor	Cathy Yan	$84,158,461
7.	Dolittle	Universal Pictures	Robert Downey Jr., Antonio Banderas, Michael Sheen, Emma Thompson, Rami Malek, John Cena, Kumail Nanjiani, Octavia Spencer, Tom Holland, Craig Robinson, Ralph Fiennes, Selena Gomez and Marion Cotillard	Stephen Gaghan	$77,047,065
8.	Little Women	Sony Pictures	Saoirse Ronan, Emma Watson, Florence Pugh, Eliza Scanlen, Laura Dern, Timothée Chalamet, Meryl Streep, Tracy Letts, Bob Odenkirk, James Norton, Louis Garrel and Chris Cooper	Greta Gerwig	$70,508,087
9.	The Invisible Man	Universal Pictures	Elisabeth Moss, Aldis Hodge, Storm Reid, Harriet Dyer, Michael Dorman and Oliver Jackson-Cohen	Leigh Whannell	$64,914,050
10.	The Call of the Wild	20th Century Studios	Harrison Ford, Omar Sy, Cara Gee, Dan Stevens, Karen Gillan and Bradley Whitford	Chris Sanders	$62,342,368

=== In-Year Release ===
Highest-grossing films of 2020 by In-year release
Rank	Title	Distributor	Domestic gross
1.	Bad Boys for Life	Sony	$206,305,244
2.	Sonic the Hedgehog	Paramount	$148,974,665
3.	Birds of Prey	Warner Bros.	$84,158,461
4.	Dolittle	Universal	$77,047,065
5.	The Invisible Man	Universal	$70,410,000
6.	The Call of the Wild	20th Century	$62,342,368
7.	Onward	Disney	$61,555,145
8.	The Croods: A New Age	Universal	$58,544,525
9.	Tenet	Warner Bros.	$58,456,624
10.	Wonder Woman 1984 (Note: Streaming simultaneously on HBO Max)	Warner Bros.	$46,534,027

Highest-grossing films by MPAA rating of 2020
G	Toy Story (re-release)
PG	Sonic the Hedgehog
PG-13	Tenet
R	Bad Boys for Life

== See also ==
- List of American films — American films by year
- Lists of box office number-one films

== Chronology ==
Preceded by 2019	2020	Succeeded by 2021
