= List of 2019 box office number-one films in the United States =

This is a list of films which placed number one at the weekend box office for the year 2019.

== Number-one films ==
†	This implies the highest-grossing movie of the year.

#	Weekend end date	Film	Gross	Notes	Refs
1	January 6, 2019	Aquaman	$31,003,280	Aquaman's worldwide gross ($940 million) surpassed Batman v Superman: Dawn of Justice ($873.6 million) as the highest-grossing film globally in the DC Extended Universe. Its international gross ($680 million) also surpassed The Dark Knight Rises' ($636.8 million) as the highest grossing international gross for a film based on a DC Comics property.	
2	January 13, 2019	The Upside	$20,355,000	Aquaman became the only film in the DC Extended Universe to gross $1 billion worldwide.	
3	January 20, 2019	Glass	$40,328,920		
4	January 27, 2019	Glass	$18,884,440	During the weekend, Aquaman's worldwide total ($1.091 billion) surpassed The Dark Knight Rises ($1.084 billion) as the all-time highest-grossing film based on a DC Comics property.	
5	February 3, 2019	Glass	$9,548,795	Glass became the first film in 2019 to top the box office for three consecutive weekends.	
6	February 10, 2019	The Lego Movie 2: The Second Part	$34,115,335		
7	February 17, 2019	Alita: Battle Angel	$28,525,613		
8	February 24, 2019	How to Train Your Dragon: The Hidden World	$55,022,245		
9	March 3, 2019	How to Train Your Dragon: The Hidden World	$30,028,540		
10	March 10, 2019	Captain Marvel	$153,433,423	Captain Marvel broke Wonder Woman's record ($103.2 million) for the highest weekend debut for a female directed film.	
11	March 17, 2019	Captain Marvel	$67,988,130		
12	March 24, 2019	Us	$71,117,625	Us broke Ted's record ($54.4 million) for the highest opening for an original R-rated film and A Quiet Place's record ($50.2 million) for the highest opening for an original horror film.	
13	March 31, 2019	Dumbo	$45,990,748		
14	April 7, 2019	Shazam!	$53,505,326		
15	April 14, 2019	Shazam!	$24,453,514		
16	April 21, 2019	The Curse of La Llorona	$26,347,631		
17	April 28, 2019	Avengers: Endgame †	$357,115,007	Avengers: Endgame's $60 million gross from Thursday night preview showings broke Star Wars: The Force Awakens' record ($57 million) for the highest Thursday night gross of all-time. Its opening day gross of $157 million broke Star Wars: The Force Awakens' record ($119.1 million) for the highest single day and opening day gross of all-time. It also broke Avengers: Infinity War's records ($257.7 million) for the highest weekend debuts in April, for a spring release, a superhero film, a Walt Disney Studios film, a 3D film, a PG-13-rated film, and of all-time. It also became the first film to gross over $300 million for an opening weekend and had the highest weekend debut of 2019. Its $1.2 billion worldwide opening weekend broke Avengers: Infinity War's records ($640.5 million) for the highest worldwide opening weekend debut for a comic book film and of all-time. It also broke Avengers: Infinity War's record (11 days) for the fastest film to reach $1 billion worldwide, doing so in 5 days. It opened in 4662 locations, breaking Despicable Me 3's record (4535 locations) for the widest release of all time.	
18	May 5, 2019	Avengers: Endgame †	$147,383,211	Avengers: Endgame broke Avatar's record (47 days) for the fastest film to reach $2 billion worldwide, doing so in 11 days.	
19	May 12, 2019	Avengers: Endgame †	$63,299,066	Avengers: Endgame ($723.5 million) surpassed Black Panther ($700.1 million) as the highest grossing superhero film domestically. In second place, Detective Pikachu's $54.4 million opening weekend broke Lara Croft: Tomb Raider's record ($47.7 million) for the highest weekend debut for a video game adaptation.	
20	May 19, 2019	John Wick: Chapter 3 – Parabellum	$56,818,067		
21	May 26, 2019	Aladdin	$91,500,929		
22	June 2, 2019	Godzilla: King of the Monsters	$47,776,293		
23	June 9, 2019	The Secret Life of Pets 2	$46,652,680		
24	June 16, 2019	Men in Black: International	$30,035,838		
25	June 23, 2019	Toy Story 4	$120,908,065	Toy Story 4 broke Toy Story 3's record ($110.3 million) for the highest weekend debut for a G-rated film. Its worldwide opening weekend ($244.5 million) broke Incredibles 2's record ($235.8 million) for the highest worldwide opening weekend for an animated film.	
26	June 30, 2019	Toy Story 4	$59,700,331		
27	July 7, 2019	Spider-Man: Far From Home	$92,579,212	Spider-Man: Far From Home's $39.3 million opening day gross broke The Amazing Spider-Man's record ($35 million) for the highest Tuesday gross of all time.	
28	July 14, 2019	Spider-Man: Far From Home	$45,353,359		
29	July 21, 2019	The Lion King	$191,770,759	The Lion King's opening day gross of $77.9 million broke Incredibles 2's record ($71.2 million) for the highest opening day gross for an animated film. It also broke Harry Potter and the Deathly Hallows – Part 2's record ($169.2 million) for the highest weekend debut in July, Incredibles 2's records ($182.7 million) for the highest weekend debuts for an animated film and a PG-rated film as well as Beauty and the Beast's record ($174.8 million) for the highest weekend debut for a musical film. During the weekend, Avengers: Endgame ($2.79 billion) surpassed Avatar ($2.789 billion) as the highest-grossing film worldwide of all time.	
30	July 28, 2019	The Lion King	$76,621,553		
31	August 4, 2019	Fast & Furious Presents: Hobbs & Shaw	$60,038,950		
32	August 11, 2019	Fast & Furious Presents: Hobbs & Shaw	$25,265,795		
33	August 18, 2019	Good Boys	$21,402,605		
34	August 25, 2019	Angel Has Fallen	$21,380,987		
35	September 1, 2019	Angel Has Fallen	$11,799,409		
36	September 8, 2019	It Chapter Two	$91,062,152		
37	September 15, 2019	It Chapter Two	$39,606,550		
38	September 22, 2019	Downton Abbey	$31,033,665		
39	September 29, 2019	Abominable	$20,612,100		
40	October 6, 2019	Joker	$96,202,337	Joker broke Venom's record ($80.3 million) for the highest weekend debut in October.	
41	October 13, 2019	Joker	$55,861,403		
42	October 20, 2019	Maleficent: Mistress of Evil	$36,948,713		
43	October 27, 2019	Maleficent: Mistress of Evil	$19,369,877	Initial estimates had Joker ahead of Maleficent: Mistress of Evil. Joker's ($848.2 million) worldwide total broke Deadpool 2's record ($785.0 million) for the highest grossing R-rated film worldwide.	
44	November 3, 2019	Terminator: Dark Fate	$29,033,832		
45	November 10, 2019	Midway	$17,897,419		
46	November 17, 2019	Ford v Ferrari	$31,474,958	During the week, Joker became the first R-rated film to gross $1 billion worldwide.	
47	November 24, 2019	Frozen 2	$130,263,358	Frozen II broke Zootopia's record ($75 million) for the highest weekend debut for a Walt Disney Animation Studios film. Its worldwide opening weekend ($358.5 million) broke Toy Story 4's record ($235.8 million) for the highest worldwide opening weekend for an animated film.	
48	December 1, 2019	Frozen 2	$85,977,773	Frozen II broke The Hunger Games: Catching Fire's record ($74.1 million) for the highest Thanksgiving weekend ever and Incredibles 2's record ($80.9 million) for the highest second weekend gross for an animated film.	
49	December 8, 2019	Frozen 2	$35,165,614	Frozen II became the first animated film since Ralph Breaks the Internet to top the box office for three consecutive weekends.	
50	December 15, 2019	Jumanji: The Next Level	$59,251,543	During the weekend, Frozen II reached $1.03 billion worldwide, becoming the tenth animated film to reach the billion-dollar mark and the 45th overall to do so.	
51	December 22, 2019	Star Wars: The Rise of Skywalker	$177,383,864		
52	December 29, 2019	Star Wars: The Rise of Skywalker	$72,389,590		

== Highest-grossing films ==
=== Calendar Gross ===
Highest-grossing films of 2019 by Calendar Gross

Rank	Title	Distributor(s)	Actor(s)	Director(s)	Gross
1.	Avengers: Endgame	Walt Disney Studios Motion Pictures	Robert Downey Jr., Chris Evans, Mark Ruffalo, Chris Hemsworth, Scarlett Johansson, Jeremy Renner, Don Cheadle, Paul Rudd, Brie Larson, Karen Gillan, Danai Gurira, Benedict Wong, Jon Favreau, Bradley Cooper, Gwyneth Paltrow and Josh Brolin	Russo brothers	$858,373,000
2.	The Lion King	Walt Disney Studios Motion Pictures	voices of Donald Glover, Seth Rogen, Chiwetel Ejiofor, Alfre Woodard, Billy Eichner, John Kani, John Oliver, Beyoncé and James Earl Jones	Jon Favreau	$543,638,043
3.	Toy Story 4	Walt Disney Studios Motion Pictures	voices of Tom Hanks, Tim Allen, Annie Potts, Tony Hale, Keegan-Michael Key, Jordan Peele, Madeleine McGraw, Christina Hendricks, Keanu Reeves, Ally Maki, Jay Hernandez, Lori Alan, Joan Cusack, Don Rickles, Wallace Shawn, John Ratzenberger, Estelle Harris, Blake Clark, Bonnie Hunt, Jeff Garlin, Kristen Schaal and Timothy Dalton	Josh Cooley	$434,038,008
4.	Frozen 2	Walt Disney Studios Motion Pictures	voices of Kristen Bell, Idina Menzel, Josh Gad and Jonathan Groff	Chris Buck and Jennifer Lee	$430,144,682
5.	Captain Marvel	Walt Disney Studios Motion Pictures	Brie Larson, Samuel L. Jackson, Ben Mendelsohn, Djimon Hounsou, Lee Pace, Lashana Lynch, Gemma Chan, Annette Bening, Clark Gregg and Jude Law	Anna Boden and Ryan Fleck	$426,829,839
6.	Star Wars: The Rise of Skywalker	Walt Disney Studios Motion Pictures	Carrie Fisher, Mark Hamill, Adam Driver, Daisy Ridley, John Boyega, Oscar Isaac, Anthony Daniels, Naomi Ackie, Domhnall Gleeson, Richard E. Grant, Lupita Nyong'o, Keri Russell, Joonas Suotamo, Kelly Marie Tran, Ian McDiarmid and Billy Dee Williams	J. J. Abrams	$390,706,234
7.	Spider-Man: Far From Home	Sony Pictures Releasing	Tom Holland, Samuel L. Jackson, Zendaya, Cobie Smulders, Jon Favreau, J. B. Smoove, Jacob Batalon, Martin Starr, Tony Revolori, Marisa Tomei and Jake Gyllenhaal	Jon Watts	$390,532,085
8.	Aladdin	Walt Disney Studios Motion Pictures	Will Smith, Mena Massoud, Naomi Scott, Marwan Kenzari, Navid Negahban, Nasim Pedrad and Billy Magnussen	Guy Ritchie	$355,559,216
9.	Joker	Warner Bros. Pictures	Joaquin Phoenix, Robert De Niro, Zazie Beetz and Frances Conroy	Todd Phillips	$333,494,002
10.	It Chapter Two	Warner Bros. Pictures	Jessica Chastain, James McAvoy, Bill Hader, Isaiah Mustafa, Jay Ryan, James Ransone, Andy Bean and Bill Skarsgård	Andy Muschietti	$211,593,228

=== In-Year Release ===
Highest-grossing films of 2019 by In-year release
Rank	Title	Distributor	Domestic gross
1.	Avengers: Endgame	Disney	$858,373,000
2.	The Lion King	Disney	$543,638,043
3.	Star Wars: The Rise of Skywalker	Disney	$515,202,542
4.	Frozen 2	Disney	$477,373,578
5.	Toy Story 4	Disney	$434,038,008
6.	Captain Marvel	Disney	$426,829,839
7.	Spider-Man: Far From Home	Sony	$390,532,085
8.	Aladdin	Disney	$355,559,216
9.	Joker	Warner Bros.	$335,451,311
10.	Jumanji: The Next Level	Sony	$320,314,960

Highest-grossing films of 2019 by MPAA rating
G	Toy Story 4
PG	The Lion King
PG-13	Avengers: Endgame
R	Joker

== See also ==
- List of American films — American films by year
- Lists of box office number-one films

== Chronology ==
Preceded by 2018	2019	Succeeded by 2020
