= List of 2016 box office number-one films in the United States =

This is a list of films which placed number one at the weekend box office for the year 2016.

== Number-one films ==
†	This implies the highest-grossing movie of the year.

#	Weekend end date	Film	Gross	Notes	Ref
1	January 3, 2016	Star Wars: The Force Awakens	$90,241,673	Star Wars: The Force Awakens broke Avatar's record ($68.4 million) for the highest third weekend gross of all time and American Sniper's record ($89.2 million) for the highest weekend gross in January.	
2	January 10, 2016	Star Wars: The Force Awakens	$42,353,785	The Hunger Games: Mockingjay – Part 2 and Star Wars: The Force Awakens became the first two films to consecutively top the box office for four consecutive weekends each since Dumb and Dumber and Legends of the Fall in 1994 and 1995. The latter also became the first film in history to gross over $800 million at the domestic box office.	
3	January 17, 2016	Ride Along 2	$35,243,095		
4	January 24, 2016	The Revenant	$16,009,718	The Revenant reached #1 on its third weekend in wide release and fifth overall weekend of release. It also became the first film since The Martian to top the box office in its fifth weekend.	
5	January 31, 2016	Kung Fu Panda 3	$41,282,042	Kung Fu Panda 3 broke The Nut Job's record ($19.4 million) for the biggest January opening for an animated film.	
6	February 7, 2016	Kung Fu Panda 3	$21,242,181	In third place, Star Wars: The Force Awakens became the first film in history to gross over $900 million at the domestic box office and became the third film to gross over $2 billion worldwide after Avatar and Titanic.	
7	February 14, 2016	Deadpool	$132,434,639	Deadpool's $12.5 million Thursday night gross broke The Hangover Part II's record ($10.4 million) for the highest Thursday night gross for an R-rated film. It also broke Fifty Shades of Grey's records ($85.1 million) for the highest weekend debuts in February and for the President's Day weekend, American Sniper's record ($89.2 million) for the highest weekend debut for a winter release, The Matrix Reloaded's record ($91.7 million) for the highest weekend debut for an R-rated film, and Star Wars: Episode III – Revenge of the Sith's record ($108.4 million) for the largest opening weekend for 20th Century Fox.	
8	February 21, 2016	Deadpool	$56,470,167		
9	February 28, 2016	Deadpool	$31,115,195	Deadpool became the first film of 2016 to top the box office for three consecutive weekends.	
10	March 6, 2016	Zootopia	$75,063,401	Zootopia broke The Lorax's record ($70.2 million) for the biggest March opening for an animated film and Frozen's record ($67.4 million) for the highest wide opening weekend for a Walt Disney Animation Studios film.	
11	March 13, 2016	Zootopia	$51,339,887		
12	March 20, 2016	Zootopia	$37,164,158	Zootopia and Deadpool became the first two films to win at least three consecutive weekends in a row since Ride Along and The Lego Movie in 2014. The former also became the first animated film since The Lego Movie to top the box office for three consecutive weekends.	
13	March 27, 2016	Batman v Superman: Dawn of Justice	$166,007,347	Batman v Superman: Dawn of Justice broke The Hunger Games' records ($152.5 million) for the highest weekend debuts in March and for a spring release, Furious 7's record ($147.2 million) for the highest Easter weekend debut, Man of Steel's record ($116.6 million) for the highest opening weekend for a film starring Superman and The Dark Knight Rises' records ($160.8 million) for the highest opening weekends for a film based on a DC Comics property and a film starring Batman. Its $422.5 million worldwide opening weekend broke The Avengers' record ($392.5 million) for the highest worldwide opening weekend debut for a comic book film.	
14	April 3, 2016	Batman v Superman: Dawn of Justice	$51,335,254	During the week, Deadpool became the second highest grossing R-rated film of all-time ($355.1 million) behind The Passion of the Christ ($370.7 million).	
15	April 10, 2016	The Boss	$23,586,645		
16	April 17, 2016	The Jungle Book	$103,261,464	During the week, Zootopia became the tenth animated film to gross over $300 million.	
17	April 24, 2016	The Jungle Book	$61,538,821		
18	May 1, 2016	The Jungle Book	$43,714,706		
19	May 8, 2016	Captain America: Civil War	$179,139,142	Captain America: Civil War broke Iron Man 3's record ($174.1 million) for the highest weekend debut for a film in the Marvel Cinematic Universe outside of the Avengers films and Spider-Man 3's record ($151.1 million) for the highest debut for a film featuring Spider-Man. It had the highest weekend debut of 2016.	
20	May 15, 2016	Captain America: Civil War	$72,637,142		
21	May 22, 2016	The Angry Birds Movie	$38,155,177		
22	May 29, 2016	X-Men: Apocalypse	$65,769,562		
23	June 5, 2016	Teenage Mutant Ninja Turtles: Out of the Shadows	$35,316,382		
24	June 12, 2016	The Conjuring 2	$40,406,314		
25	June 19, 2016	Finding Dory †	$135,060,273	Finding Dory's $54.7 million opening day gross broke Minions' record ($46 million) for the highest opening day gross for an animated film. It also broke Toy Story 3's record ($110.3 million) for the highest weekend debut for a Pixar animated film and Shrek the Third's records ($121.6 million) for the highest weekend debuts for an animated film and a PG-rated film.	
26	June 26, 2016	Finding Dory †	$72,959,954	Finding Dory broke Shrek 2's record ($72.1 million) for the highest second weekend for an animated film.	
27	July 3, 2016	Finding Dory †	$41,817,176	Finding Dory broke Shrek 2's record ($37.9 million) for the highest third weekend for an animated film and became the fastest animated movie ever to reach $300 million. It also became the first animated film since Zootopia to top the box office for three consecutive weekends.	
28	July 10, 2016	The Secret Life of Pets	$104,352,905	The Secret Life of Pets broke Inside Out's records ($90.4 million) for the highest weekend debut for an original film and for a non-sequel animated film. During the week, Finding Dory became the fifth animated film to gross over $400 million.	
29	July 17, 2016	The Secret Life of Pets	$50,838,355	During the week, Finding Dory surpassed Shrek 2 ($441.2 million) as the highest grossing animated film of all time.	
30	July 24, 2016	Star Trek Beyond	$59,253,211		
31	July 31, 2016	Jason Bourne	$59,215,365		
32	August 7, 2016	Suicide Squad	$133,682,248	Suicide Squad broke Guardians of the Galaxy's record ($94.3 million) for the highest weekend debut in August.	
33	August 14, 2016	Suicide Squad	$43,536,013		
34	August 21, 2016	Suicide Squad	$20,855,401		
35	August 28, 2016	Don't Breathe	$26,411,706		
36	September 4, 2016	Don't Breathe	$15,833,223		
37	September 11, 2016	Sully	$35,028,301		
38	September 18, 2016	Sully	$21,653,017		
39	September 25, 2016	The Magnificent Seven	$34,703,397		
40	October 2, 2016	Miss Peregrine's Home for Peculiar Children	$28,871,140		
41	October 9, 2016	The Girl on the Train	$24,536,265		
42	October 16, 2016	The Accountant	$24,710,273		
43	October 23, 2016	Boo! A Madea Halloween	$28,501,448		
44	October 30, 2016	Boo! A Madea Halloween	$17,220,312		
45	November 6, 2016	Doctor Strange	$85,058,311		
46	November 13, 2016	Doctor Strange	$42,970,065		
47	November 20, 2016	Fantastic Beasts and Where To Find Them	$74,403,387		
48	November 27, 2016	Moana	$56,631,401		
49	December 4, 2016	Moana	$28,270,989		
50	December 11, 2016	Moana	$18,533,804		
51	December 18, 2016	Rogue One: A Star Wars Story	$155,081,681	Rogue One: A Star Wars Story broke Minions' record ($115.7 million) for the highest weekend debut for a prequel.	
52	December 25, 2016	Rogue One: A Star Wars Story	$64,033,768		
53	January 1, 2017	Rogue One: A Star Wars Story	$49,609,002	Rogue One: A Star Wars Story and Moana became the first two films to top the box office for at least three consecutive weekends in a row since Deadpool and Zootopia.	

== Highest-grossing films ==
=== Calendar Gross ===
Highest-grossing films of 2016 by Calendar Gross

Rank	Title	Distributor(s)	Actor(s)	Director(s)	Gross
1.	Finding Dory	Walt Disney Studios Motion Pictures	voices of Ellen DeGeneres, Albert Brooks, Hayden Rolence, Ed O'Neill, Kaitlin Olson, Ty Burrell, Diane Keaton and Eugene Levy	Andrew Stanton	$486,295,561
2.	Rogue One: A Star Wars Story	Walt Disney Studios Motion Pictures	Felicity Jones, Diego Luna, Ben Mendelsohn, Donnie Yen, Mads Mikkelsen, Alan Tudyk, Jiang Wen and Forest Whitaker	Gareth Edwards	$408,235,850
3.	Captain America: Civil War	Walt Disney Studios Motion Pictures	Chris Evans, Robert Downey Jr., Scarlett Johansson, Sebastian Stan, Anthony Mackie, Don Cheadle, Jeremy Renner, Chadwick Boseman, Paul Bettany, Elizabeth Olsen, Paul Rudd, Emily VanCamp, Marisa Tomei, Tom Holland, Frank Grillo, Martin Freeman, William Hurt and Daniel Brühl	The Russo brothers	$408,084,349
4.	The Secret Life of Pets	Universal Pictures	voices of Louis C.K., Eric Stonestreet, Kevin Hart, Jenny Slate, Ellie Kemper, Lake Bell, Dana Carvey, Hannibal Buress, Bobby Moynihan, Steve Coogan and Albert Brooks	Chris Renaud	$368,384,330
5.	The Jungle Book	Walt Disney Studios Motion Pictures	Neel Sethi, Bill Murray, Ben Kingsley, Idris Elba, Lupita Nyong'o, Scarlett Johansson, Giancarlo Esposito and Christopher Walken	Jon Favreau	$364,001,123
6.	Deadpool	20th Century Fox	Ryan Reynolds, Morena Baccarin, Ed Skrein, T.J. Miller, Gina Carano and Brianna Hildebrand	Tim Miller	$363,042,311
7.	Zootopia	Walt Disney Studios Motion Pictures	voices of Ginnifer Goodwin, Jason Bateman, Idris Elba, Jenny Slate, Nate Torrence, Bonnie Hunt, Don Lake, Tommy Chong, J. K. Simmons, Octavia Spencer, Alan Tudyk and Shakira	Byron Howard and Rich Moore	$341,268,248
8.	Batman v Superman: Dawn of Justice	Warner Bros. Pictures	Ben Affleck, Henry Cavill, Amy Adams, Jesse Eisenberg, Diane Lane, Laurence Fishburne, Jeremy Irons, Holly Hunter and Gal Gadot	Zack Snyder	$330,360,194
9.	Suicide Squad	Warner Bros. Pictures	Will Smith, Jared Leto, Margot Robbie, Joel Kinnaman, Viola Davis, Jai Courtney, Jay Hernandez, Adewale Akinnuoye-Agbaje, Ike Barinholtz, Scott Eastwood and Cara Delevingne	David Ayer	$325,100,054
10.	Star Wars: The Force Awakens	Walt Disney Studios Motion Pictures	Harrison Ford, Mark Hamill, Carrie Fisher, Adam Driver, Daisy Ridley, John Boyega, Oscar Isaac, Lupita Nyong'o, Andy Serkis, Domhnall Gleeson, Anthony Daniels, Peter Mayhew and Max von Sydow	J. J. Abrams	$283,676,870

=== In-Year Release ===
Highest-grossing films of 2016 by In-year release
Rank	Title	Distributor	Domestic gross
1.	Rogue One: A Star Wars Story	Disney	$532,177,324
2.	Finding Dory	Disney	$486,295,561
3.	Captain America: Civil War	Disney	$408,084,349
4.	The Secret Life of Pets	Universal	$368,384,330
5.	The Jungle Book	Disney	$364,001,123
6.	Deadpool	Fox	$363,070,709
7.	Zootopia	Disney	$341,268,248
8.	Batman v Superman: Dawn of Justice	Warner Bros.	$330,360,194
9.	Suicide Squad	Warner Bros.	$325,100,054
10.	Sing	Universal	$270,329,045

Highest-grossing films by MPAA rating of 2016
G	A Beautiful Planet
PG	Finding Dory
PG-13	Rogue One: A Star Wars Story
R	Deadpool

== See also ==
- List of American films — American films by year
- List of box office number-one films

== Chronology ==
Preceded by 2015	2016	Succeeded by 2017
