= List of 2018 box office number-one films in the United States =

This is a list of films which placed number one at the weekend box office for the year 2018.

== Number-one films ==
| † | This implies the highest-grossing movie of the year. |

| # | Weekend end date | Film | Gross | Notes | Ref |
|---|---|---|---|---|---|
| 1 | January 7, 2018 | Jumanji: Welcome to the Jungle | $37,233,653 | Jumanji: Welcome to the Jungle reached the #1 spot in its third weekend of release. | |
| 2 | January 14, 2018 | Jumanji: Welcome to the Jungle | $28,101,972 | Jumanji: Welcome to the Jungle became the first film since Hidden Figures to top the box office in its fourth weekend of release. | |
| 3 | January 21, 2018 | Jumanji: Welcome to the Jungle | $19,505,170 | Jumanji: Welcome to the Jungle became the first film in 2018 to top the box office for three consecutive weekends. It also became the first film since The Revenant to top the box office in its fifth weekend. | |
| 4 | January 28, 2018 | Maze Runner: The Death Cure | $24,167,011 | | |
| 5 | February 4, 2018 | Jumanji: Welcome to the Jungle | $10,930,222 | Jumanji: Welcome to the Jungle reclaimed the #1 spot on its seventh weekend of release, making it the first film since Avatar to top the box office in its seventh weekend. It also became the first film since Star Wars: The Force Awakens to top the box office for four weekends as well as the first film since The Martian to top the box office for four nonconsecutive weekends. | |
| 6 | February 11, 2018 | Fifty Shades Freed | $38,560,195 | | |
| 7 | February 18, 2018 | Black Panther † | $202,003,951 | Black Panther broke Captain America: Civil War's record ($179.1 million) for the highest weekend debut for a film in the Marvel Cinematic Universe outside of the Avengers films. It also broke Deadpool's records ($132.4 million) for the highest weekend debuts in February, for a winter release, and for the President's Day weekend. | |
| 8 | February 25, 2018 | Black Panther † | $111,658,835 | | |
| 9 | March 4, 2018 | Black Panther † | $66,306,935 | | |
| 10 | March 11, 2018 | Black Panther † | $40,817,579 | Black Panther became the first film since Star Wars: The Force Awakens to top the box office for four consecutive weekends. | |
| 11 | March 18, 2018 | Black Panther † | $26,650,690 | Black Panther became the first film since Avatar to top the box office for five consecutive weekends. It also became the first film since Jumanji: Welcome to the Jungle to top the box office in its fifth weekend. | |
| 12 | March 25, 2018 | Pacific Rim Uprising | $28,116,535 | During the weekend, Black Panther became the highest-grossing superhero film ever domestically, surpassing The Avengers. | |
| 13 | April 1, 2018 | Ready Player One | $41,764,050 | | |
| 14 | April 8, 2018 | A Quiet Place | $50,203,562 | A Quiet Place broke The Conjuring's record ($41.8 million) for the highest weekend debut for an original horror film. | |
| 15 | April 15, 2018 | Rampage | $35,753,093 | | |
| 16 | April 22, 2018 | A Quiet Place | $20,911,809 | A Quiet Place reclaimed the #1 spot in its third weekend of release. | |
| 17 | April 29, 2018 | Avengers: Infinity War | $257,698,183 | Avengers: Infinity War broke Furious 7's record ($147.2 million) for the highest weekend debut in April, Beauty and the Beast's record ($174.8 million) for the highest weekend debut for a spring release, The Avengers' record ($207.4 million) for the highest weekend debut for a superhero film and Star Wars: The Force Awakens' records ($248 million) for the highest weekend debut for a Walt Disney Studios film, a 3D film, a PG-13-rated film, and of all-time. Its $640.5 million worldwide opening weekend broke Batman v Superman: Dawn of Justice's record ($422.5 million) for the highest worldwide opening weekend debut for a comic book film and The Fate of the Furious' record ($541.9 million) for the highest worldwide opening of all-time. It had the highest weekend debut of 2018. | |
| 18 | May 6, 2018 | Avengers: Infinity War | $114,774,810 | Avengers: Infinity War broke Star Wars: The Force Awakens' record (12 days) for the fastest film to gross $1 billion worldwide, crossing the mark in 11 days. | |
| 19 | May 13, 2018 | Avengers: Infinity War | $62,078,047 | | |
| 20 | May 20, 2018 | Deadpool 2 | $125,507,153 | Deadpool 2 broke It's records for the highest grossing Thursday preview night ($13.5 million) and the biggest opening day ($50.4 million) for an R-rated film with $18.6 million and $53.3 million respectively. It also broke The Matrix Reloaded's record ($91.7 million) for the biggest opening weekend for an R-rated sequel. | |
| 21 | May 27, 2018 | Solo: A Star Wars Story | $84,420,489 | | |
| 22 | June 3, 2018 | Solo: A Star Wars Story | $29,396,882 | | |
| 23 | June 10, 2018 | Ocean's 8 | $41,607,378 | | |
| 24 | June 17, 2018 | Incredibles 2 | $182,687,905 | Incredibles 2's opening day gross of $71.6 million broke Finding Dory's record ($54.7 million) for the highest opening day gross for an animated film. It also broke Finding Dory's records ($135.1 million) for the highest weekend debuts for a Pixar animated film, an animated film overall, and Beauty and the Beast's record ($174.8 million) for the highest weekend debut for a PG-rated film. | |
| 25 | June 24, 2018 | Jurassic World: Fallen Kingdom | $148,024,610 | Incredibles 2 and Jurassic World: Fallen Kingdom became the first two films to bring in over $100 million over two consecutive weekends since Shrek the Third and Pirates of the Caribbean: At World's End in 2007, and the first time this had ever happened over two non-holiday weekends. In second place, Incredibles 2's second-weekend gross of $80.9 million broke Finding Dory's record ($72.9 million) for the highest second-weekend gross for an animated film. | |
| 26 | July 1, 2018 | Jurassic World: Fallen Kingdom | $60,912,195 | | |
| 27 | July 8, 2018 | Ant-Man and the Wasp | $75,812,205 | During the weekend, Incredibles 2 ($503.7 million) broke Finding Dory's record for the highest grossing animated film and highest grossing Pixar film of all time ($486.3 million) and became the first animated film to gross $500 million. | |
| 28 | July 15, 2018 | Hotel Transylvania 3: Summer Vacation | $44,076,225 | | |
| 29 | July 22, 2018 | The Equalizer 2 | $36,011,640 | | |
| 30 | July 29, 2018 | Mission: Impossible – Fallout | $61,236,534 | | |
| 31 | August 5, 2018 | Mission: Impossible – Fallout | $35,323,815 | During the weekend, Black Panther became the first superhero film, and third film overall, to gross $700 million. | |
| 32 | August 12, 2018 | The Meg | $45,402,195 | The Meg broke Deep Blue Sea's record ($19.1 million) for highest opening for a live-action shark film. | |
| 33 | August 19, 2018 | Crazy Rich Asians | $26,510,140 | | |
| 34 | August 26, 2018 | Crazy Rich Asians | $24,808,202 | | |
| 35 | September 2, 2018 | Crazy Rich Asians | $21,964,345 | During the weekend, Incredibles 2 became the first animated film to gross $600 million. | |
| 36 | September 9, 2018 | The Nun | $53,807,379 | | |
| 37 | September 16, 2018 | The Predator | $24,632,284 | | |
| 38 | September 23, 2018 | The House with a Clock in Its Walls | $26,608,020 | | |
| 39 | September 30, 2018 | Night School | $27,257,615 | | |
| 40 | October 7, 2018 | Venom | $80,255,756 | Venom broke Gravity's record ($55.8 million) for the highest weekend debut in October. | |
| 41 | October 14, 2018 | Venom | $35,006,107 | | |
| 42 | October 21, 2018 | Halloween | $76,221,545 | Halloween broke Friday the 13th's record ($40.5 million) for the highest weekend debut for a slasher film. | |
| 43 | October 28, 2018 | Halloween | $31,419,070 | | |
| 44 | November 4, 2018 | Bohemian Rhapsody | $51,061,119 | | |
| 45 | November 11, 2018 | The Grinch | $67,572,855 | The Grinch broke How the Grinch Stole Christmas' record ($55 million) for the highest weekend debut for a Christmas-themed film. | |
| 46 | November 18, 2018 | Fantastic Beasts: The Crimes of Grindelwald | $62,163,104 | | |
| 47 | November 25, 2018 | Ralph Breaks the Internet | $56,237,634 | In second place, Creed II's $35.2 million opening weekend broke Creed's record ($30.1 million) for the highest weekend debut for a boxing film and 101 Dalmatians' record ($33.5 million) for the highest live-action Thanksgiving opening. | |
| 48 | December 2, 2018 | Ralph Breaks the Internet | $25,566,945 | | |
| 49 | December 9, 2018 | Ralph Breaks the Internet | $16,253,831 | Ralph Breaks the Internet became the first animated film since Coco to top the box office for three consecutive weekends. | |
| 50 | December 16, 2018 | Spider-Man: Into the Spider-Verse | $35,363,376 | Ralph Breaks the Internet and Spider-Man: Into the Spider-Verse became the first two animated films to top the box office for four consecutive weekends since Finding Dory and The Secret Life of Pets in 2016. | |
| 51 | December 23, 2018 | Aquaman | $67,873,522 | | |
| 52 | December 30, 2018 | Aquaman | $52,114,571 | | |

== Highest-grossing films ==
=== Calendar Gross ===
Highest-grossing films of 2018 by Calendar Gross

| Rank | Title | Studio(s) | Actor(s) | Director(s) | Gross |
|---|---|---|---|---|---|
| 1. | Black Panther | Walt Disney Studios | Chadwick Boseman, Michael B. Jordan, Lupita Nyong'o, Danai Gurira, Martin Freeman, Daniel Kaluuya, Letitia Wright, Winston Duke, Sterling K. Brown, Angela Bassett, Forest Whitaker and Andy Serkis | Ryan Coogler | $700,059,566 |
| 2. | Avengers: Infinity War | Walt Disney Studios | Robert Downey Jr., Chris Hemsworth, Mark Ruffalo, Chris Evans, Scarlett Johansson, Benedict Cumberbatch, Don Cheadle, Tom Holland, Chadwick Boseman, Paul Bettany, Elizabeth Olsen, Anthony Mackie, Sebastian Stan, Danai Gurira, Letitia Wright, Tom Hiddleston, Idris Elba, Peter Dinklage, Benedict Wong, Pom Klementieff, Karen Gillan, Dave Bautista, Zoe Saldaña, Vin Diesel, Bradley Cooper, Gwyneth Paltrow, Benicio del Toro, Josh Brolin and Chris Pratt | Anthony Russo and Joe Russo | $678,815,482 |
| 3. | Incredibles 2 | Walt Disney Studios | voices of Craig T. Nelson, Holly Hunter, Sarah Vowell, Huckleberry Milner, Samuel L. Jackson, Bob Odenkirk, Catherine Keener and Jonathan Banks | Brad Bird | $608,581,744 |
| 4. | Jurassic World: Fallen Kingdom | Universal Pictures | Chris Pratt, Bryce Dallas Howard, Rafe Spall, Toby Jones, Ted Levine, BD Wong and Jeff Goldblum | J. A. Bayona | $417,719,760 |
| 5. | Deadpool 2 | 20th Century Fox | Ryan Reynolds, Josh Brolin, Morena Baccarin, Julian Dennison, Zazie Beetz, T. J. Miller, Brianna Hildebrand and Jack Kesy | David Leitch | $318,482,400 |
| 6. | The Grinch | Universal Pictures | voices of Benedict Cumberbatch, Rashida Jones, Kenan Thompson, Cameron Seely, Angela Lansbury and Pharrell Williams | Scott Mosier and Yarrow Cheney | $266,280,410 |
| 7. | Jumanji: Welcome to the Jungle | Sony Pictures | Dwayne Johnson, Jack Black, Kevin Hart, Karen Gillan, Nick Jonas and Bobby Cannavale | Jake Kasdan | $235,512,923 |
| 8. | Mission: Impossible – Fallout | Paramount Pictures | Tom Cruise, Henry Cavill, Ving Rhames, Simon Pegg, Rebecca Ferguson, Sean Harris, Angela Bassett, Michelle Monaghan and Alec Baldwin | Christopher McQuarrie | $220,159,104 |
| 9. | Ant-Man and the Wasp | Walt Disney Studios | Paul Rudd, Evangeline Lilly, Michael Peña, Walton Goggins, Bobby Cannavale, Judy Greer, Tip "T.I." Harris, David Dastmalchian, Hannah John-Kamen, Abby Ryder Fortson, Randall Park, Michelle Pfeiffer, Laurence Fishburne and Michael Douglas | Peyton Reed | $216,648,740 |
| 10. | Solo: A Star Wars Story | Walt Disney Studios | Alden Ehrenreich, Woody Harrelson, Emilia Clarke, Donald Glover, Thandiwe Newton, Phoebe Waller-Bridge, Joonas Suotamo and Paul Bettany | Ron Howard | $213,767,512 |

=== In-Year Release ===
Highest-grossing films of 2018 by In-year release
| Rank | Title | Distributor | Domestic gross |
|---|---|---|---|
| 1. | Black Panther | Disney | $700,059,566 |
| 2. | Avengers: Infinity War | Disney | $678,815,482 |
| 3. | Incredibles 2 | Disney | $608,581,744 |
| 4. | Jurassic World: Fallen Kingdom | Universal | $416,769,345 |
| 5. | Aquaman | Warner Bros. | $335,061,807 |
| 6. | Deadpool 2 | 20th Century Fox | $318,491,426 |
| 7. | The Grinch | Universal | $270,620,950 |
| 8. | Mission: Impossible – Fallout | Paramount | $220,159,104 |
| 9. | Ant-Man and the Wasp | Disney | $216,648,740 |
| 10. | Bohemian Rhapsody | 20th Century Fox | $216,428,042 |

Highest-grossing films by MPAA rating of 2018
| G | Pandas |
| PG | Incredibles 2 |
| PG-13 | Black Panther |
| R | Deadpool 2 |

== See also ==
- List of American films — American films by year
- Lists of box office number-one films

== Chronology ==
| Preceded by 2017 | 2018 | Succeeded by 2019 |
