= List of 2022 box office number-one films in the United States =

This is a list of films which ranked number one at the weekend box office for the year 2022.

== Number-one films ==
†	This implies the highest-grossing movie of the year.

#	Weekend end date	Film	Gross	Notes	Ref.
1	January 9, 2022	Spider-Man: No Way Home	$32,617,921	Spider-Man: No Way Home became the first film since Shang-Chi and the Legend of the Ten Rings to top the box office for four consecutive weekends. During the weekend, Sing 2 became the first animated film since the COVID-19 lockdowns in North America to surpass $100 million domestically.	
2	January 16, 2022	Scream	$30,018,805		
3	January 23, 2022	Spider-Man: No Way Home	$14,005,614	Spider-Man: No Way Home reclaimed the #1 spot in its sixth weekend of release, making it the first film since Guardians of the Galaxy to top the box office in its sixth weekend. It also became the first film since The Croods: A New Age to top the box office for five weekends as well as for five nonconsecutive weekends.	
4	January 30, 2022	Spider-Man: No Way Home	$11,003,528	Spider-Man: No Way Home became the first film since Jumanji: Welcome to the Jungle to top the box office in its seventh weekend. It also became the first film since Avatar to top the box office for six weekends as well as the first film since Back to the Future to top the box office for six nonconsecutive weekends. During the weekend, the film surpassed $1 billion at the international box office.	
5	February 6, 2022	Jackass Forever	$23,154,388		
6	February 13, 2022	Death on the Nile	$12,891,123		
7	February 20, 2022	Uncharted	$44,010,155		
8	February 27, 2022	Uncharted	$23,001,773		
9	March 6, 2022	The Batman	$134,008,624		
10	March 13, 2022	The Batman	$66,511,221	In third place, BTS Permission to Dance on Stage — Seoul: Live Viewing's $6.8 million opening weekend broke Burn the Stage: The Movie's record ($2.4 million) for the highest opening for an event cinema film.	
11	March 20, 2022	The Batman	$36,723,197	The Batman became the first film in 2022 to top the box office for three consecutive weekends.	
12	March 27, 2022	The Lost City	$30,453,269	During the weekend, Spider-Man: No Way Home became the third film to gross over $800 million at the domestic box office after Star Wars: The Force Awakens and Avengers: Endgame.	
13	April 3, 2022	Morbius	$39,005,895		
14	April 10, 2022	Sonic the Hedgehog 2	$72,105,176	Sonic the Hedgehog 2 broke Sonic the Hedgehog's record ($58 million) for the highest weekend debut for a video game adaptation.	
15	April 17, 2022	Fantastic Beasts: The Secrets of Dumbledore	$42,151,256		
16	April 24, 2022	The Bad Guys	$23,950,245	During the week, Sonic the Hedgehog 2 ($149.5 million) passed Sonic the Hedgehog ($148.9 million) to become the highest grossing video game adaptation of all time at the domestic box office.	
17	May 1, 2022	The Bad Guys	$16,237,070		
18	May 8, 2022	Doctor Strange in the Multiverse of Madness	$187,420,998	Doctor Strange in the Multiverse of Madness had the highest weekend debut of 2022.	
19	May 15, 2022	Doctor Strange in the Multiverse of Madness	$61,755,804		
20	May 22, 2022	Doctor Strange in the Multiverse of Madness	$32,304,560		
21	May 29, 2022	Top Gun: Maverick †	$126,707,459	Top Gun: Maverick broke Pirates of the Caribbean: At World's End's record ($114.7 million) for the highest Memorial Day weekend debut.	
22	June 5, 2022	Top Gun: Maverick †	$90,037,011	Top Gun: Maverick's –28.9% drop broke Shrek 2's record (–33.2%) for the smallest drop in its second weekend of any film debuting with over $100 million in its opening weekend.	
23	June 12, 2022	Jurassic World Dominion	$145,075,625		
24	June 19, 2022	Jurassic World Dominion	$59,150,175		
25	June 26, 2022	Elvis	$31,211,579	Initial estimates had Top Gun: Maverick ahead of Elvis.	
26	July 3, 2022	Minions: The Rise of Gru	$107,010,140	Minions: The Rise of Gru broke Transformers: Dark of the Moon's record ($97.9 million) for the highest Fourth of July weekend debut. It also became the first animated film to open with $100 million during the COVID-19 pandemic era.	
27	July 10, 2022	Thor: Love and Thunder	$144,165,107	Minions: The Rise of Gru and Thor: Love and Thunder became the first two films to bring in over $100 million over two consecutive weekends since Incredibles 2 and Jurassic World: Fallen Kingdom in 2018.	
28	July 17, 2022	Thor: Love and Thunder	$46,632,172		
29	July 24, 2022	Nope	$44,366,910	Nope had the highest opening weekend for an original film since director Jordan Peele's previous film Us in 2019.	
30	July 31, 2022	DC League of Super-Pets	$23,003,441		
31	August 7, 2022	Bullet Train	$30,030,156		
32	August 14, 2022	Bullet Train	$13,405,022		
33	August 21, 2022	Dragon Ball Super: Super Hero	$21,053,798	Dragon Ball Super: Super Hero became the first foreign language film since Demon Slayer: Mugen Train to reach #1 at the box office, as well as the first Japanese animated film since Demon Slayer: Mugen Train to reach #1 at the box office.	
34	August 28, 2022	The Invitation	$6,805,468		
35	September 4, 2022	Top Gun: Maverick †	$6,014,128	Top Gun: Maverick reclaimed the #1 spot in its fifteenth week of release after twelve weekends out of the top spot, making it the first film since Titanic to top the box office in its fifteenth weekend and the first film since The Martian to top the box office for three nonconsecutive weekends. Initial estimates had Spider-Man: No Way Home (The More Fun Stuff Version) ahead of Top Gun: Maverick.	
36	September 11, 2022	Barbarian	$10,543,948		
37	September 18, 2022	The Woman King	$19,051,442		
38	September 25, 2022	Don't Worry Darling	$19,353,213		
39	October 2, 2022	Smile	$22,609,925		
40	October 9, 2022	Smile	$18,461,772	Smile's –18.3% drop marked the best non-holiday hold of the COVID-19 pandemic era.	
41	October 16, 2022	Halloween Ends	$40,050,355	Simultaneously released on Peacock.	
42	October 23, 2022	Black Adam	$67,004,323		
43	October 30, 2022	Black Adam	$27,472,140		
44	November 6, 2022	Black Adam	$18,271,625		
45	November 13, 2022	Black Panther: Wakanda Forever	$181,339,761	Black Panther: Wakanda Forever broke The Hunger Games: Catching Fire's record ($158.1 million) for the highest weekend debut in November as well as Beauty and the Beast's record ($174.7 million) for the highest weekend debut for a film with a female protagonist.	
46	November 20, 2022	Black Panther: Wakanda Forever	$66,482,266		
47	November 27, 2022	Black Panther: Wakanda Forever	$45,583,904	Black Adam and Black Panther: Wakanda Forever became the first two films to top the box office for at least three consecutive weekends in a row since Star Wars: The Last Jedi and Jumanji: Welcome to the Jungle.	
48	December 4, 2022	Black Panther: Wakanda Forever	$17,540,051	Black Panther: Wakanda Forever became the first film since Spider-Man: No Way Home to top the box office for four consecutive weekends.	
49	December 11, 2022	Black Panther: Wakanda Forever	$11,234,702	Black Panther: Wakanda Forever became the first film since Spider-Man: No Way Home to top the box office for five weekends as well as the first film since Tenet to top the box office for five consecutive weekends.	
50	December 18, 2022	Avatar: The Way of Water	$134,100,226	Avatar: The Way of Water broke Avatar's record ($77 million) for the highest weekend debut for an environmentalist film and Deadpool's record ($132.4 million) for the highest weekend debut for a 20th Century Studios film.	
51	December 25, 2022	Avatar: The Way of Water	$63,338,220		
52	January 1, 2023	Avatar: The Way of Water	$67,409,155	Black Adam, Black Panther: Wakanda Forever, and Avatar: The Way of Water became the first three films since Coco, Star Wars: The Last Jedi, and Jumanji: Welcome to the Jungle to each top the box office for at least three consecutive weekends in a row.	

== Highest-grossing films ==
=== Calendar gross ===
Highest-grossing films of 2022 by Calendar Gross

Rank	Title	Studio(s)	Actor(s)	Director(s)	Domestic Gross
1.	Top Gun: Maverick	Paramount	Tom Cruise, Miles Teller, Jennifer Connelly, Jon Hamm, Glen Powell, Lewis Pullman, Ed Harris and Val Kilmer	Joseph Kosinski	$718,732,821
2.	Black Panther: Wakanda Forever	Walt Disney Studios	Letitia Wright, Lupita Nyong'o, Danai Gurira, Winston Duke, Florence Kasumba, Dominique Thorne, Michaela Coel, Tenoch Huerta Mejía, Martin Freeman, Julia Louis-Dreyfus and Angela Bassett	Ryan Coogler	$436,499,646
3.	Doctor Strange in the Multiverse of Madness	Walt Disney Studios	Benedict Cumberbatch, Elizabeth Olsen, Chiwetel Ejiofor, Benedict Wong, Xochitl Gomez, Michael Stuhlbarg and Rachel McAdams	Sam Raimi	$411,331,607
4.	Avatar: The Way of Water	20th Century Studios	Sam Worthington, Zoe Saldaña, Sigourney Weaver, Stephen Lang, Kate Winslet, Joel David Moore, CCH Pounder, Giovanni Ribisi, Dileep Rao, Matt Gerald, Cliff Curtis, Edie Falco and Jemaine Clement	James Cameron	$401,007,908
5.	Jurassic World Dominion	Universal	Chris Pratt, Bryce Dallas Howard, Isabella Sermon, Laura Dern, Jeff Goldblum, Sam Neill, DeWanda Wise, Mamoudou Athie, BD Wong and Omar Sy	Colin Trevorrow	$376,851,080
6.	Minions: The Rise of Gru	Universal	voices of Steve Carell, Pierre Coffin, Taraji P. Henson, Michelle Yeoh, Russell Brand, Julie Andrews and Alan Arkin	Kyle Balda	$369,695,210
7.	The Batman	Warner Bros.	Robert Pattinson, Zoë Kravitz, Paul Dano, Jeffrey Wright, John Turturro, Peter Sarsgaard, Andy Serkis and Colin Farrell	Matt Reeves	$369,345,583
8.	Thor: Love and Thunder	Walt Disney Studios	Chris Hemsworth, Christian Bale, Tessa Thompson, Jaimie Alexander, Taika Waititi, Russell Crowe and Natalie Portman	Taika Waititi	$343,256,830
9.	Spider-Man: No Way Home	Sony Pictures	Tom Holland, Zendaya, Benedict Cumberbatch, Jacob Batalon, Jon Favreau, Jamie Foxx, Willem Dafoe, Alfred Molina, Benedict Wong, Tony Revolori, Marisa Tomei, Andrew Garfield and Tobey Maguire	Jon Watts	$241,130,301
10.	Sonic the Hedgehog 2	Paramount	James Marsden, Ben Schwartz, Tika Sumpter, Colleen O'Shaughnessey, Natasha Rothwell, Adam Pally, Shemar Moore, Lee Majdoub, Idris Elba and Jim Carrey	Jeff Fowler	$190,872,904

=== In-Year Release ===
Highest-grossing films of 2022 by In-year release
Rank	Title	Distributor	Domestic gross
1.	Top Gun: Maverick	Paramount	$718,732,821
2.	Avatar: The Way of Water	20th Century	$684,075,767
3.	Black Panther: Wakanda Forever	Disney	$453,829,060
4.	Doctor Strange in the Multiverse of Madness	Disney	$411,331,607
5.	Jurassic World Dominion	Universal	$376,851,080
6.	Minions: The Rise of Gru	Universal	$369,695,210
7.	The Batman	Warner Bros.	$369,345,583
8.	Thor: Love and Thunder	Disney	$343,256,830
9.	Sonic the Hedgehog 2	Paramount	$190,872,904
10.	Puss in Boots: The Last Wish	Universal	$185,535,345

Highest-grossing films by MPA rating of 2022
G	Pandas (re-release)
PG	Minions: The Rise of Gru
PG-13	Top Gun: Maverick
R	Nope

== See also ==
- Lists of American films — American films by year
- Lists of box office number-one films

== Chronology ==
Preceded by 2021	2022	Succeeded by 2023
