= List of 2021 box office number-one films in the United States =

This is a list of films which ranked number one at the weekend box office for the year 2021.

== Number-one films ==
†	This implies the highest-grossing movie of the year.

#	Weekend end date	Film	Gross	Notes	Ref
1	January 3, 2021	Wonder Woman 1984	$5,429,210		
2	January 10, 2021	Wonder Woman 1984	$2,960,015		
3	January 17, 2021	The Marksman	$3,104,204		
4	January 24, 2021	The Marksman	$2,029,944		
5	January 31, 2021	The Little Things	$4,705,527	Simultaneously released on HBO Max.	
6	February 7, 2021	The Little Things	$2,051,189		
7	February 14, 2021	The Croods: A New Age	$2,079,825	The Croods: A New Age reclaimed the #1 spot in its twelfth weekend of release after eight weekends out of the top spot, making it the first film since Titanic to top the box office in its twelfth weekend. It also became the first film since Tenet to top the box office for four weekends as well as the first film since Jumanji: Welcome to the Jungle to top the box office for four nonconsecutive weekends.	
8	February 21, 2021	The Croods: A New Age	$1,718,455	The Croods: A New Age became the first film since Titanic to top the box office in its thirteenth weekend. It also became the first film since Tenet to top the box office for five weekends as well as the first film since Forrest Gump to top the box office for five nonconsecutive weekends.	
9	February 28, 2021	Tom & Jerry	$14,112,629	Simultaneously released on HBO Max.	
10	March 7, 2021	Raya and the Last Dragon	$8,502,498	Simultaneously released on Disney+ Premier Access.	
11	March 14, 2021	Raya and the Last Dragon	$5,706,633	During the weekend, Avatar ($2.83 billion) surpassed Avengers: Endgame ($2.79 billion) as the highest-grossing film worldwide of all time following its re-release in China.	
12	March 21, 2021	Raya and the Last Dragon	$5,129,473	Raya and the Last Dragon became the first film in 2021 to top the box office for three consecutive weekends.	
13	March 28, 2021	Nobody	$6,820,100		
14	April 4, 2021	Godzilla vs. Kong	$31,625,971	Simultaneously released on HBO Max. Godzilla vs. Kong was the first film since the COVID-19 lockdowns to open in more than 3,000 locations.	
15	April 11, 2021	Godzilla vs. Kong	$13,882,474		
16	April 18, 2021	Godzilla vs. Kong	$7,847,227		
17	April 25, 2021	Mortal Kombat	$23,302,576	Simultaneously released on HBO Max. In second place, Demon Slayer: Kimetsu no Yaiba – The Movie: Mugen Train's $21.1 million opening weekend broke Hero's record ($17.8 million) for the highest weekend debut for a foreign language film.	
18	May 2, 2021	Demon Slayer: Kimetsu no Yaiba – The Movie: Mugen Train	$6,412,933	Demon Slayer: Kimetsu no Yaiba – The Movie: Mugen Train reached #1 in its second weekend of release. It also became the first foreign language film since Hero and the first Japanese animated film since Pokémon: The First Movie to reach #1 at the box office.	
19	May 9, 2021	Wrath of Man	$8,309,007		
20	May 16, 2021	Spiral	$8,750,034		
21	May 23, 2021	Spiral	$4,595,320		
22	May 30, 2021	A Quiet Place Part II	$47,547,231		
23	June 6, 2021	The Conjuring: The Devil Made Me Do It	$24,104,332	Simultaneously released on HBO Max.	
24	June 13, 2021	A Quiet Place Part II	$12,012,263	A Quiet Place Part II reclaimed the #1 spot in its third weekend of release. This weekend, it became the first film since the COVID-19 lockdowns in North America to surpass $100 million domestically.	
25	June 20, 2021	Hitman's Wife's Bodyguard	$11,397,820		
26	June 27, 2021	F9	$70,043,165	F9 was the first film since the COVID-19 lockdowns to open in more than 4,000 locations.	
27	July 4, 2021	F9	$23,008,860		
28	July 11, 2021	Black Widow	$80,366,312	Simultaneously released on Disney+ Premier Access.	
29	July 18, 2021	Space Jam: A New Legacy	$31,053,362	Simultaneously released on HBO Max. Space Jam: A New Legacy broke Space Jam's record ($27.5 million) for the highest weekend debut for a basketball film.	
30	July 25, 2021	Old	$16,854,735		
31	August 1, 2021	Jungle Cruise	$35,018,731	Simultaneously released on Disney+ Premier Access.	
32	August 8, 2021	The Suicide Squad	$26,205,415	Simultaneously released on HBO Max.	
33	August 15, 2021	Free Guy	$28,365,416		
34	August 22, 2021	Free Guy	$18,504,022		
35	August 29, 2021	Candyman	$22,001,750	Candyman director Nia DaCosta became the first black female director to top the domestic box office.	
36	September 5, 2021	Shang-Chi and the Legend of the Ten Rings	$75,388,688	Shang-Chi and the Legend of the Ten Rings broke Halloween's record ($26.3 million) for the highest Labor Day weekend debut.	
37	September 12, 2021	Shang-Chi and the Legend of the Ten Rings	$34,701,070		
38	September 19, 2021	Shang-Chi and the Legend of the Ten Rings	$21,670,751		
39	September 26, 2021	Shang-Chi and the Legend of the Ten Rings	$13,031,411	Shang-Chi and the Legend of the Ten Rings became the first film since Tenet to top the box office for four consecutive weekends. During the week, it also became the first film since the COVID-19 lockdowns in North America to surpass $200 million domestically.	
40	October 3, 2021	Venom: Let There Be Carnage	$90,033,210		
41	October 10, 2021	No Time to Die	$55,225,007		
42	October 17, 2021	Halloween Kills	$49,404,980	Simultaneously released on Peacock.	
43	October 24, 2021	Dune	$41,011,174	Simultaneously released on HBO Max.	
44	October 31, 2021	Dune	$15,413,486		
45	November 7, 2021	Eternals	$71,297,219		
46	November 14, 2021	Eternals	$26,850,128		
47	November 21, 2021	Ghostbusters: Afterlife	$44,008,406		
48	November 28, 2021	Encanto	$27,206,494		
49	December 5, 2021	Encanto	$13,147,618		
50	December 12, 2021	West Side Story	$10,574,618		
51	December 19, 2021	Spider-Man: No Way Home †	$260,138,569	Spider-Man: No Way Home broke Black Panther's record ($202 million) for the highest weekend debut for a film in the Marvel Cinematic Universe outside of the Avengers films. It also broke Star Wars: The Force Awakens' records ($248 million) for the highest weekend debuts in December and for the holiday season. It was the first film of the COVID-19 pandemic to gross over $100 and $200 million in one weekend. It had the highest weekend debut of 2021.	
52	December 26, 2021	Spider-Man: No Way Home †	$84,548,505	During the weekend, Spider-Man: No Way Home became the first film of the COVID-19 pandemic era to gross $1 billion worldwide.	
53	January 2, 2022	Spider-Man: No Way Home †	$56,023,590		

== Highest-grossing films ==
=== Calendar gross ===
Highest-grossing films of 2021 by Calendar Gross

Rank	Title	Studio(s)	Actor(s)	Director(s)	Domestic Gross
1.	Spider-Man: No Way Home	Sony Pictures	Tom Holland, Zendaya, Benedict Cumberbatch, Jacob Batalon, Jon Favreau, Jamie Foxx, Willem Dafoe, Alfred Molina, Benedict Wong, Tony Revolori, Marisa Tomei, Andrew Garfield and Tobey Maguire	Jon Watts	$572,984,769
2.	Shang-Chi and the Legend of the Ten Rings	Walt Disney Studios	Simu Liu, Awkwafina, Meng'er Zhang, Fala Chen, Florian Munteanu, Benedict Wong, Michelle Yeoh, Ben Kingsley and Tony Leung	Destin Daniel Cretton	$224,543,292
3.	Venom: Let There Be Carnage	Sony Pictures	Tom Hardy, Michelle Williams, Naomie Harris, Reid Scott, Stephen Graham and Woody Harrelson	Andy Serkis	$212,527,511
4.	Black Widow (Note: Streaming simultaneously on Disney+ Premier Access)	Walt Disney Studios	Scarlett Johansson, Florence Pugh, David Harbour, O-T Fagbenle, Olga Kurylenko, William Hurt, Ray Winstone and Rachel Weisz	Cate Shortland	$183,651,655
5.	F9	Universal Pictures	Vin Diesel, Michelle Rodriguez, Tyrese Gibson, Chris "Ludacris" Bridges, John Cena, Nathalie Emmanuel, Jordana Brewster, Sung Kang, Helen Mirren, Kurt Russell and Charlize Theron	Justin Lin	$173,005,945
6.	Eternals	Walt Disney Studios	Gemma Chan, Richard Madden, Kumail Nanjiani, Lia McHugh, Brian Tyree Henry, Lauren Ridloff, Barry Keoghan, Don Lee, Harish Patel, Kit Harington, Salma Hayek and Angelina Jolie	Chloé Zhao	$164,855,144
7.	No Time To Die	Metro-Goldwyn-Mayer	Daniel Craig, Rami Malek, Léa Seydoux, Lashana Lynch, Ben Whishaw, Naomie Harris, Jeffrey Wright, Christoph Waltz and Ralph Fiennes	Cary Joji Fukunaga	$160,772,007
8.	A Quiet Place Part II (Note: Streaming simultaneously on Paramount+ after exclusively playing in theaters for 45 days)	Paramount Pictures	Emily Blunt, Cillian Murphy, Millicent Simmonds, Noah Jupe, Djimon Hounsou and John Krasinski	John Krasinski	$160,215,261
9.	Ghostbusters: Afterlife	Sony Pictures	Carrie Coon, Finn Wolfhard, Mckenna Grace, Paul Rudd, Logan Kim, Celeste O'Connor, Bill Murray, Dan Aykroyd, Ernie Hudson, Annie Potts and Sigourney Weaver	Jason Reitman	$122,403,060
10.	Free Guy	20th Century Studios	Ryan Reynolds, Jodie Comer, Lil Rel Howery, Utkarsh Ambudkar, Joe Keery and Taika Waititi	Shawn Levy	$121,626,598

=== In-year release ===
Highest-grossing films of 2021 by In-year release
Rank	Title	Distributor	Domestic gross
1.	Spider-Man: No Way Home	Sony	$804,793,477
2.	Shang-Chi and the Legend of the Ten Rings	Disney	$224,543,292
3.	Venom: Let There Be Carnage	Sony	$213,550,366
4.	Black Widow	Disney	$183,651,655
5.	F9	Universal	$173,005,945
6.	Eternals	Disney	$164,870,234
7.	Sing 2	Universal	$162,790,990
8.	No Time To Die	MGM	$160,891,007
9.	A Quiet Place Part II	Paramount	$160,215,261
10.	Ghostbusters: Afterlife	Sony	$129,360,575

Highest-grossing films by MPAA rating of 2021
G	Paw Patrol: The Movie (Note: Released simultaneously the same day in theaters and on Paramount+)
PG	Sing 2
PG-13	Spider-Man: No Way Home
R	Halloween Kills (Note: Streaming simultaneously on Peacock)

== See also ==
- Lists of American films — American films by year
- Lists of box office number-one films

== Chronology ==
Preceded by 2020	2021	Succeeded by 2022
