= List of 2024 box office number-one films in the United States =

This is a list of films that ranked number one at the weekend box office for the year 2024.

== Number-one films ==
†	This implies the highest-grossing movie of the year.

#	Weekend end date	Film	Gross	Notes	Ref.
1	January 7, 2024	Wonka	$14,077,078	Wonka became the first film since Barbie to top the box office in its fourth weekend and the first film since Top Gun: Maverick to top the box office for three nonconsecutive weekends.	
2	January 14, 2024	Mean Girls	$28,635,307		
3	January 21, 2024	Mean Girls	$11,663,166		
4	January 28, 2024	Mean Girls	$6,902,347	Mean Girls became the first film of 2024 to top the box office for three consecutive weekends. Initial estimates had The Beekeeper ahead of Mean Girls.	
5	February 4, 2024	Argylle	$17,473,540		
6	February 11, 2024	Argylle	$6,249,360		
7	February 18, 2024	Bob Marley: One Love	$28,659,004		
8	February 25, 2024	Bob Marley: One Love	$13,458,354		
9	March 3, 2024	Dune: Part Two	$82,505,391		
10	March 10, 2024	Kung Fu Panda 4	$57,989,905		
11	March 17, 2024	Kung Fu Panda 4	$30,149,970		
12	March 24, 2024	Ghostbusters: Frozen Empire	$45,004,673		
13	March 31, 2024	Godzilla x Kong: The New Empire	$80,006,561		
14	April 7, 2024	Godzilla x Kong: The New Empire	$31,203,359		
15	April 14, 2024	Civil War	$25,712,608	Civil War broke Hereditary's record ($13.6 million) for the highest weekend debut for an A24 film and the first from the company that debuted #1 at the weekend box office.	
16	April 21, 2024	Civil War	$11,127,753		
17	April 28, 2024	Challengers	$15,011,061		
18	May 5, 2024	The Fall Guy	$27,747,035		
19	May 12, 2024	Kingdom of the Planet of the Apes	$58,400,788		
20	May 19, 2024	IF	$33,715,801		
21	May 26, 2024	Furiosa: A Mad Max Saga	$26,326,462		
22	June 2, 2024	The Garfield Movie	$14,005,272	The Garfield Movie reached the #1 spot in its second weekend of release.	
23	June 9, 2024	Bad Boys: Ride or Die	$56,527,324		
24	June 16, 2024	Inside Out 2 †	$154,201,673		
25	June 23, 2024	Inside Out 2 †	$101,210,550	Inside Out 2 broke The Super Mario Bros. Movie's record ($92.3 million) for the highest second weekend gross for an animated film and had the biggest second weekend for a film since Avengers: Endgame ($147.4 million). It also became the first animated film to gross $100 million in its second weekend.	
26	June 30, 2024	Inside Out 2 †	$57,520,208	Inside Out 2 became the first film since Mean Girls to top the box office for three consecutive weekends. It also broke Frozen II's record (25 days) for the fastest animated film to reach $1 billion worldwide, doing so in 19 days.	
27	July 7, 2024	Despicable Me 4	$75,009,210		
28	July 14, 2024	Despicable Me 4	$43,598,695		
29	July 21, 2024	Twisters	$81,251,415	Twisters broke The Day After Tomorrow's record ($68.7 million) for the highest weekend debut for a natural disaster film. During the week, Inside Out 2 broke Frozen II's record as the highest-grossing animated film worldwide.	
30	July 28, 2024	Deadpool & Wolverine	$211,435,291	Deadpool & Wolverine broke Deadpool 2's records for the highest Thursday preview night ($18.6 million) and the biggest opening day ($53.3 million) for an R-rated film with $38.5 million and $96 million respectively. It also broke The Lion King's record ($191.8 million) for the highest weekend debut in July, Deadpool's record ($132.4 million) for the highest weekend debut for an R-rated film, and Jurassic World's record ($208.8 million) for the highest weekend debut for a summer release. It had the highest weekend debut of 2024. During the weekend, Inside Out 2 broke Incredibles 2's records ($608.6 million) for the highest-grossing animated film and highest-grossing Pixar film of all time at the domestic box office.	
31	August 4, 2024	Deadpool & Wolverine	$96,809,328	Deadpool & Wolverine broke American Sniper's record ($64.6 million) for the highest second weekend gross for an R-rated film. It also broke The Passion of the Christ's record ($370.7 million) for the highest grossing R-rated film domestically.	
32	August 11, 2024	Deadpool & Wolverine	$53,774,969	Deadpool & Wolverine became the first film since Inside Out 2 to top the box office for three consecutive weekends. During the week, Deadpool & Wolverine broke Joker's record as the highest-grossing R-rated film worldwide.	
33	August 18, 2024	Alien: Romulus	$42,003,361		
34	August 25, 2024	Deadpool & Wolverine	$18,310,240	Deadpool & Wolverine reclaimed the #1 spot in its fifth weekend of release, making it the first film since Avatar: The Way of Water to top the box office in its fifth weekend and the first film since The Croods: A New Age to top the box office for four nonconsecutive weekends. During the weekend, Inside Out 2 became the first animated film to gross $1 billion at the international box office.	
35	September 1, 2024	Deadpool & Wolverine	$15,469,312	Deadpool & Wolverine became the first film since Avatar: The Way of Water to top the box office in its sixth weekend of release and the first film since Spider-Man: No Way Home to top the box office for five nonconsecutive weekends.	
36	September 8, 2024	Beetlejuice Beetlejuice	$111,003,345		
37	September 15, 2024	Beetlejuice Beetlejuice	$51,350,355		
38	September 22, 2024	Beetlejuice Beetlejuice	$25,937,144	Beetlejuice Beetlejuice became the first film since Deadpool & Wolverine to top the box office for three consecutive weekends.	
39	September 29, 2024	The Wild Robot	$35,790,150		
40	October 6, 2024	Joker: Folie à Deux	$37,678,467		
41	October 13, 2024	Terrifier 3	$18,928,113		
42	October 20, 2024	Smile 2	$23,021,692		
43	October 27, 2024	Venom: The Last Dance	$51,012,404		
44	November 3, 2024	Venom: The Last Dance	$25,902,766		
45	November 10, 2024	Venom: The Last Dance	$15,904,148	Venom: The Last Dance became the first film since Beetlejuice Beetlejuice to top the box office for three consecutive weekends.	
46	November 17, 2024	Red One	$32,106,112		
47	November 24, 2024	Wicked	$112,508,890	Wicked broke Into the Woods' record ($31.1 million) for the highest weekend debut for a film based on a Broadway musical. In second place, Gladiator II's $55.5 million opening weekend broke 8 Mile's record ($51.2 million) for the highest weekend debut for a historical action film.	
48	December 1, 2024	Moana 2	$139,787,385	Moana 2 broke Frozen II's records for the highest weekend debut for a Walt Disney Animation Studios film ($130.3 million) and the highest Thanksgiving weekend ever ($86 million) as well as Frozen's record ($67.4 million) for the highest Thanksgiving weekend debut. Its worldwide opening weekend ($386.3 million) broke The Super Mario Bros. Movie's record ($377 million) for the highest worldwide opening weekend for an animated film. In second place, Wicked's –27.9% drop broke Top Gun: Maverick's record (–28.9%) for the smallest second-weekend drop for any film debuting with over $100 million in its opening weekend. It also broke Grease's record ($190 million) for the highest-grossing Broadway adaptation at the domestic box office. Wicked and Moana 2 became the first two films since Minions: The Rise of Gru and Thor: Love and Thunder in 2022 to bring in over $100 million over two consecutive weekends.	
49	December 8, 2024	Moana 2	$51,287,053		
50	December 15, 2024	Moana 2	$26,499,368	Moana 2 became the first film since Venom: The Last Dance to top the box office for three consecutive weekends.	
51	December 22, 2024	Sonic the Hedgehog 3	$60,102,146		
52	December 29, 2024	Sonic the Hedgehog 3	$37,010,506		

== Highest-grossing films ==
=== Calendar gross ===
Highest-grossing films of 2024 by Calendar Gross

Rank	Title	Studio(s)	Actor(s)	Director(s)	Domestic Gross
1.	Inside Out 2	Disney	voices of Amy Poehler, Maya Hawke, Kensington Tallman, Liza Lapira, Tony Hale, Lewis Black, Phyllis Smith, Ayo Edebiri, Lilimar Hernandez, Grace Lu, Sumayyah Nuriddin-Green, Adèle Exarchopoulos, Diane Lane, Kyle MacLachlan and Paul Walter Hauser	Kelsey Mann	$652,980,194
2.	Deadpool & Wolverine	Disney	Ryan Reynolds, Hugh Jackman, Emma Corrin, Morena Baccarin, Rob Delaney, Leslie Uggams, Aaron Stanford and Matthew Macfadyen	Shawn Levy	$636,745,858
3.	Wicked	Universal	Cynthia Erivo, Ariana Grande, Jonathan Bailey, Ethan Slater, Bowen Yang, Marissa Bode, Peter Dinklage, Michelle Yeoh and Jeff Goldblum	Jon M. Chu	$432,943,285
4.	Moana 2	Disney	voices of Auliʻi Cravalho, Dwayne Johnson, Hualālai Chung, Rose Matafeo, David Fane, Awhimai Fraser, Khaleesi Lambert-Tsuda, Temuera Morrison, Nicole Scherzinger, Rachel House, Gerald Ramsey and Alan Tudyk	David Derrick Jr., Jason Hand and Dana Ledoux Miller	$404,017,489
5.	Despicable Me 4	Universal	voices of Steve Carell, Kristen Wiig, Pierre Coffin, Joey King, Miranda Cosgrove, Steve Coogan, Sofía Vergara, Stephen Colbert, Chris Renaud, Madison Polan, Dana Gaier, Chloe Fineman and Will Ferrell	Chris Renaud	$361,004,205
6.	Beetlejuice Beetlejuice	Warner Bros.	Michael Keaton, Winona Ryder, Catherine O'Hara, Justin Theroux, Monica Bellucci, Jenna Ortega and Willem Dafoe	Tim Burton	$294,100,435
7.	Dune: Part Two	Warner Bros.	Timothée Chalamet, Zendaya, Rebecca Ferguson, Josh Brolin, Austin Butler, Florence Pugh, Dave Bautista, Christopher Walken, Léa Seydoux, Stellan Skarsgård, Charlotte Rampling and Javier Bardem	Denis Villeneuve	$282,144,358
8.	Twisters	Universal	Daisy Edgar-Jones, Glen Powell, Anthony Ramos, Brandon Perea, Maura Tierney and Sasha Lane	Lee Isaac Chung	$267,762,265
9.	Godzilla x Kong: The New Empire	Warner Bros.	Rebecca Hall, Brian Tyree Henry, Dan Stevens, Kaylee Hottle, Alex Ferns and Fala Chen	Adam Wingard	$196,350,016
10.	Kung Fu Panda 4	Universal	voices of Jack Black, Awkwafina, Bryan Cranston, James Hong, Ian McShane, Ke Huy Quan, Dustin Hoffman and Viola Davis	Mike Mitchell	$193,590,620

=== In-Year Release ===
Highest-grossing films of 2024 by In-year release
Rank	Title	Distributor	Domestic gross
1.	Inside Out 2	Disney	$652,980,194
2.	Deadpool & Wolverine	Disney	$636,742,741
3.	Wicked	Universal	$473,231,120
4.	Moana 2	Disney	$460,405,297
5.	Despicable Me 4	Universal	$361,004,205
6.	Beetlejuice Beetlejuice	Warner Bros.	$294,100,435
7.	Dune: Part Two	Warner Bros.	$282,144,358
8.	Twisters	Universal	$267,762,265
9.	Mufasa: The Lion King	Disney	$254,567,693
10.	Sonic the Hedgehog 3	Paramount	$236,115,100

Highest-grossing films by MPA rating of 2024
G	The Blue Angels
PG	Inside Out 2
PG-13	Beetlejuice Beetlejuice
R	Deadpool & Wolverine

== See also ==
- Lists of American films — American films by year
- Lists of box office number-one films

== Chronology ==
Preceded by 2023	2024	Succeeded by 2025
