= Teddy's Christmas =

2022 Norwegian family film

- Release date: 11 November 2022
- Country: Norway

Teddy's Christmas (Norwegian: Teddybjørnens jul), or Alf Prøysen's Teddy's Christmas is a 2022 Norwegian family film, dubbed in English for Christmas 2023. It was directed by Andrea Eckerbom. The film was inspired by Alf Prøysens children's song Teddybjørnens vise, and the script was written by Harald Rosenløw Eeg and Lars Gudmestad. In the film, the teddy bear is animated, while the other roles are live action.

== Reception ==
The film had its Norwegian cinema premiere on 11 November 2022. Around 250,000 people saw the film in Norwegian cinemas. As one of the five most watched films in Norwegian cinemas in the period from July 2022 to June 2023, it was nominated for The People's Amanda in 2023. The film was also shown in cinemas in several other European countries, and had 30,000 visitors in the first weekend at the cinema in Germany. The 2023 English-dubbed version was the only G-rated theatrical release in the US of that year.

== Cast ==
- Marte Klerck-Nilssen: Mariann
- John Brungot: Teddy (voice)
- Zachary Levi: Teddy (English language voice)
- Vegard Strand Eide: Marianns lillebror
- Mariann Hole: Hilma, Marinanns mor
- Jan Gunnar Røise: Roger, Marianns far
- Kai Remlov: Bestefar
- Marianne Krogness: Bestemor
- Nader Khademi: Kjøpmann og Paulas far
- Medina Iqbal: Paula
- Morten Rudå: Kjøpmann
