= List of 2006 box office number-one films in the United States =

This is a list of films which have placed number one at the weekend box office in the United States during 2006.

== Number-one films ==
†	This implies the highest-grossing movie of the year.

#	Weekend end date	Film	Gross	Notes	Ref
1	January 8, 2006	Hostel	$19,556,099		
2	January 15, 2006	Glory Road	$13,594,739		
3	January 22, 2006	Underworld: Evolution	$26,857,181		
4	January 29, 2006	Big Momma's House 2	$27,736,056		
5	February 5, 2006	When a Stranger Calls	$21,607,203	When a Stranger Calls broke Boogeyman's record ($19 million) for the highest Super Bowl weekend debut.	
6	February 12, 2006	The Pink Panther	$20,220,412		
7	February 19, 2006	Eight Below	$20,188,176		
8	February 26, 2006	Madea's Family Reunion	$30,030,661		
9	March 5, 2006	Madea's Family Reunion	$12,648,954		
10	March 12, 2006	Failure to Launch	$24,411,322		
11	March 19, 2006	V for Vendetta	$25,642,340		
12	March 26, 2006	Inside Man	$28,954,945		
13	April 2, 2006	Ice Age: The Meltdown	$68,033,544	Ice Age: The Meltdown broke Ice Age's records ($46.3 million) for the highest weekend debut in March and for a spring release.	
14	April 9, 2006	Ice Age: The Meltdown	$33,823,894		
15	April 16, 2006	Scary Movie 4	$40,222,875	Scary Movie 4 broke Panic Room's record ($30.1 million) for the highest Easter weekend debut.	
16	April 23, 2006	Silent Hill	$20,152,598		
17	April 30, 2006	RV	$16,414,767		
18	May 7, 2006	Mission: Impossible III	$47,743,273		
19	May 14, 2006	Mission: Impossible III	$25,008,971		
20	May 21, 2006	The Da Vinci Code	$77,073,388		
21	May 28, 2006	X-Men: The Last Stand	$102,750,665	X-Men: The Last Stand broke The Lost World: Jurassic Park's record ($72.1 million) for the highest Memorial Day weekend debut, and Shrek 2's record ($72.2 million) for the highest Memorial Day weekend ever.	
22	June 4, 2006	The Break-Up	$39,172,785		
23	June 11, 2006	Cars	$60,119,509		
24	June 18, 2006	Cars	$33,731,634		
25	June 25, 2006	Click	$40,011,365		
26	July 2, 2006	Superman Returns	$52,535,096	In second place The Devil Wears Prada's $27.5 million weekend broke The Patriot's record ($22.4 million) for the highest non #1 Independence Day opening weekend.	
27	July 9, 2006	Pirates of the Caribbean: Dead Man's Chest †	$135,634,554	Pirates of the Caribbean: Dead Man's Chest's opening day gross of $55.8 million broke Star Wars: Episode III – Revenge of the Sith's record ($50 million) for the highest single-day tally of all time. It also broke Spider-Man's records ($114.8 million) for the highest weekend debut for a summer release, for a PG-13 rated film, and of all-time as well as Spider-Man 2's record ($88.2 million) for the highest weekend debut in July and The Incredibles' ($70.7 million) record for the highest weekend debut for a Walt Disney Studios film. Pirates of the Caribbean: Dead Man's Chest was the first film ever to gross more than $100 million in 2 days, and had the highest weekend debut of 2006.	
28	July 16, 2006	Pirates of the Caribbean: Dead Man's Chest †	$62,345,264		
29	July 23, 2006	Pirates of the Caribbean: Dead Man's Chest †	$35,215,201		
30	July 30, 2006	Miami Vice	$25,723,815		
31	August 6, 2006	Talladega Nights: The Ballad of Ricky Bobby	$47,042,215		
32	August 13, 2006	Talladega Nights: The Ballad of Ricky Bobby	$22,126,226		
33	August 20, 2006	Snakes on a Plane	$13,806,311	Initial estimates had Talladega Nights: The Ballad of Ricky Bobby ahead of Snakes on a Plane.	
34	August 27, 2006	Invincible	$17,031,122		
35	September 3, 2006	Invincible	$12,151,426		
36	September 10, 2006	The Covenant	$8,852,485		
37	September 17, 2006	Gridiron Gang	$14,414,630		
38	September 24, 2006	Jackass Number Two	$29,002,002		
39	October 1, 2006	Open Season	$23,624,548		
40	October 8, 2006	The Departed	$26,887,467		
41	October 15, 2006	The Grudge 2	$20,825,300		
42	October 22, 2006	The Prestige	$14,801,808		
43	October 29, 2006	Saw III	$33,610,391	Saw III broke Saw II's record ($31.7 million) for the highest Halloween opening weekend.	
44	November 5, 2006	Borat	$26,455,463	Borat broke Fahrenheit 9/11's record ($23.9 million) for the highest weekend debut in less than 1,000 theaters.	
45	November 12, 2006	Borat	$28,269,900		
46	November 19, 2006	Happy Feet	$41,533,432		
47	November 26, 2006	Happy Feet	$37,038,046		
48	December 3, 2006	Happy Feet	$17,545,418		
49	December 10, 2006	Apocalypto	$15,005,604		
50	December 17, 2006	The Pursuit of Happyness	$26,541,709		
51	December 24, 2006	Night at the Museum	$30,433,781		
52	December 31, 2006	Night at the Museum	$36,766,905	In third place, Dreamgirls' $14.1 million opening weekend broke Rent's records ($10.1 million) for the highest weekend debuts for a film based on a Broadway musical and for a live-action musical film.	

== Highest-grossing films ==
=== Calendar Gross ===
Highest-grossing films of 2006 by Calendar Gross

Rank	Title	Studio(s)	Actor(s)	Director(s)	Gross
1.	Pirates of the Caribbean: Dead Man's Chest	Walt Disney Pictures	Johnny Depp, Orlando Bloom, Keira Knightley, Stellan Skarsgård, Bill Nighy, Jack Davenport, Kevin R. McNally and Jonathan Pryce	Gore Verbinski	$423,317,154
2.	Cars	Walt Disney Pictures	voices of Owen Wilson, Paul Newman, Bonnie Hunt, Larry the Cable Guy, Tony Shalhoub, Cheech Marin, Michael Wallis, George Carlin, Paul Dooley, Jenifer Lewis, Guido Quaroni, Michael Keaton, Katherine Helmond, John Ratzenberger and Richard Petty	John Lasseter	$244,082,982
3.	X-Men: The Last Stand	20th Century Fox	Hugh Jackman, Halle Berry, Ian McKellen, Famke Janssen, Anna Paquin, Kelsey Grammer, James Marsden, Rebecca Romijn, Shawn Ashmore, Aaron Stanford, Vinnie Jones and Patrick Stewart	Brett Ratner	$234,362,462
4.	The Da Vinci Code	Columbia Pictures	Tom Hanks, Audrey Tautou, Ian McKellen, Alfred Molina, Jürgen Prochnow, Paul Bettany and Jean Reno	Ron Howard	$217,536,138
5.	Superman Returns	Warner Bros. Pictures	Brandon Routh, Kate Bosworth, James Marsden, Frank Langella, Eva Marie Saint, Parker Posey, Kal Penn, Sam Huntington and Kevin Spacey	Bryan Singer	$200,081,192
6.	Ice Age: The Meltdown	20th Century Fox	voices of Ray Romano, John Leguizamo, Denis Leary, Seann William Scott, Josh Peck and Queen Latifah	Carlos Saldanha	$195,330,621
7.	Happy Feet	Warner Bros. Pictures	voices of Elijah Wood, Robin Williams, Brittany Murphy, Hugh Jackman, Nicole Kidman, Hugo Weaving, Anthony La Paglia, Magda Szubanski, Steve Irwin and E.G. Daily	George Miller	$175,967,627
8.	Over the Hedge	Paramount Pictures	voices of Bruce Willis, Garry Shandling, Steve Carell, William Shatner, Wanda Sykes, Nick Nolte, Thomas Haden Church, Allison Janney, Eugene Levy, Catherine O'Hara, Avril Lavigne and Omid Djalili	Tim Johnson and Karey Kirkpatrick	$155,019,340
9.	Casino Royale	Columbia Pictures	Daniel Craig, Eva Green, Mads Mikkelsen, Jeffrey Wright and Judi Dench	Martin Campbell	$153,531,944
10.	Talladega Nights: The Ballad of Ricky Bobby	Columbia Pictures	Will Ferrell, John C. Reilly, Sacha Baron Cohen, Gary Cole, Michael Clarke Duncan, Leslie Bibb, Jane Lynch, Amy Adams and Andy Richter	Adam McKay	$148,213,377

=== In-Year Release ===
Highest-grossing films of 2006 by In-year release
Rank	Title	Distributor	Domestic Gross
1.	Pirates of the Caribbean: Dead Man's Chest	Disney	$423,315,812
2.	Night at the Museum	20th Century Fox	$250,863,268
3.	Cars	Disney	$244,082,982
4.	X-Men: The Last Stand	20th Century Fox	$234,362,462
5.	The Da Vinci Code	Columbia	$217,536,138
6.	Superman Returns	Warner Bros.	$200,081,192
7.	Happy Feet	Warner Bros.	$198,000,317
8.	Ice Age: The Meltdown	20th Century Fox	$195,330,621
9.	Casino Royale	MGM/Columbia	$167,445,960
10.	The Pursuit of Happyness	Columbia	$163,566,459

Highest-grossing films by MPAA rating of 2006
G	Cars
PG	Night at the Museum
PG-13	Pirates of the Caribbean: Dead Man's Chest
R	The Departed

== See also ==
- List of American films — American films by year
- List of box office number-one films

== Chronology ==
Preceded by 2005	2006	Succeeded by 2007
