= List of 2005 box office number-one films in the United States =

This is a list of films which have placed number one at the weekend box office in the United States during 2005.

== Number-one films ==
†	This implies the highest-grossing movie of the year.

#	Weekend end date	Film	Box office	Notes	Ref
1	January 9, 2005	Meet the Fockers	$28,498,160		
2	January 16, 2005	Coach Carter	$24,182,961		
3	January 23, 2005	Are We There Yet?	$18,575,214		
4	January 30, 2005	Hide and Seek	$21,959,233		
5	February 6, 2005	Boogeyman	$19,026,655	Boogeyman broke You Got Served's record ($16.1 million) for the highest Super Bowl weekend debut.	
6	February 13, 2005	Hitch	$43,142,214	Hitch broke 50 First Dates' record ($39.9 million) for the highest weekend debut for a romantic comedy.	
7	February 20, 2005	Hitch	$31,355,930		
8	February 27, 2005	Diary of a Mad Black Woman	$21,905,089		
9	March 6, 2005	The Pacifier	$30,522,694		
10	March 13, 2005	Robots	$36,045,301		
11	March 20, 2005	The Ring Two	$35,065,237		
12	March 27, 2005	Guess Who	$20,671,446		
13	April 3, 2005	Sin City	$29,102,733		
14	April 10, 2005	Sahara	$18,068,372		
15	April 17, 2005	The Amityville Horror	$23,507,007		
16	April 24, 2005	The Interpreter	$22,822,455		
17	May 1, 2005	The Hitchhiker's Guide to the Galaxy	$21,103,203		
18	May 8, 2005	Kingdom of Heaven	$19,635,996		
19	May 15, 2005	Monster-in-Law	$23,105,133		
20	May 22, 2005	Star Wars: Episode III – Revenge of the Sith †	$108,435,841	Star Wars Episode III: Revenge of the Sith's $16.9 million gross from midnight showings broke The Lord of the Rings: The Return of the King's record ($8 million) for the highest midnight opening ever. Its $50 million opening day gross broke Spider-Man 2's record ($40.4 million) for the highest opening day gross, Shrek 2's record ($44.8 million) for the highest single-day tally of all time, and The Matrix Reloaded's record ($37.5 million) for the highest Thursday gross of all-time. It also broke Star Wars: Episode II – Attack of the Clones' record ($80 million) for the highest weekend debut for a prequel. It had the highest weekend debut of 2005.	
21	May 29, 2005	Star Wars: Episode III – Revenge of the Sith †	$55,205,972		
22	June 5, 2005	Madagascar	$28,110,235	Madagascar reached #1 in its second weekend of release.	
23	June 12, 2005	Mr. & Mrs. Smith	$50,342,878		
24	June 19, 2005	Batman Begins	$48,745,440		
25	June 26, 2005	Batman Begins	$27,589,389		
26	July 3, 2005	War of the Worlds	$64,878,725		
27	July 10, 2005	Fantastic Four	$56,061,504		
28	July 17, 2005	Charlie and the Chocolate Factory	$56,178,450		
29	July 24, 2005	Charlie and the Chocolate Factory	$28,253,338		
30	July 31, 2005	Wedding Crashers	$20,023,159	Wedding Crashers reached #1 in its third weekend of release.	
31	August 7, 2005	The Dukes of Hazzard	$30,675,314		
32	August 14, 2005	Four Brothers	$21,176,925		
33	August 21, 2005	The 40-Year-Old Virgin	$21,422,815		
34	August 28, 2005	The 40-Year-Old Virgin	$16,275,895		
35	September 4, 2005	Transporter 2	$16,540,720	Transporter 2 broke Jeepers Creepers 2's record ($15.3 million) for the highest Labor Day weekend debut.	
36	September 11, 2005	The Exorcism of Emily Rose	$30,054,300		
37	September 18, 2005	Just like Heaven	$16,408,718		
38	September 25, 2005	Flightplan	$24,629,938		
39	October 2, 2005	Flightplan	$14,805,739		
40	October 9, 2005	Wallace & Gromit: The Curse of the Were-Rabbit	$16,025,987		
41	October 16, 2005	The Fog	$11,752,917		
42	October 23, 2005	Doom	$15,488,870		
43	October 30, 2005	Saw II	$31,752,652	Saw II broke Stargate's record ($16.6 million) for the highest Halloween opening weekend.	
44	November 6, 2005	Chicken Little	$40,049,778		
45	November 13, 2005	Chicken Little	$31,653,590		
46	November 20, 2005	Harry Potter and the Goblet of Fire	$102,685,961	Harry Potter and the Goblet of Fire broke Harry Potter and the Sorcerer's Stone's records ($90.3 million) for the highest weekend debut in November and for the holiday season. It also broke Harry Potter and the Prisoner of Azkaban's record ($93.6 million) for the highest opening for a Warner Bros. film. In second place, Walk the Line's $22.3 million opening weekend broke Ray's record ($20 million) for the highest weekend debut for a music biopic.	
47	November 27, 2005	Harry Potter and the Goblet of Fire	$54,727,138	In fifth place, Rent's $10.1 million opening weekend broke Grease's records ($9.8 million) for the highest weekend debuts for a film based on a Broadway musical and for a live-action musical film.	
48	December 4, 2005	Harry Potter and the Goblet of Fire	$19,878,136		
49	December 11, 2005	The Chronicles of Narnia: The Lion, the Witch and the Wardrobe	$65,556,312		
50	December 18, 2005	King Kong	$50,130,145		
51	December 25, 2005	King Kong	$21,259,320		
52	January 1, 2006	The Chronicles of Narnia: The Lion, the Witch and the Wardrobe	$25,686,555	The Chronicles of Narnia: The Lion, the Witch and the Wardrobe reclaimed #1 in its fourth weekend of release, becoming the first film to top the box office in its fourth weekend of release since The Lord of the Rings: The Return of the King.	

== Highest-grossing films ==
=== Calendar Gross ===
Highest-grossing films of 2005 by Calendar Gross

Rank	Title	Studio(s)	Actor(s)	Director(s)	Gross
1.	Star Wars: Episode III – Revenge of the Sith	20th Century Fox	Ewan McGregor, Natalie Portman, Hayden Christensen, Ian McDiarmid, Samuel L. Jackson, Christopher Lee, Anthony Daniels, Kenny Baker and Frank Oz	George Lucas	$380,270,577
2.	Harry Potter and the Goblet of Fire	Warner Bros. Pictures	Daniel Radcliffe, Rupert Grint, Emma Watson, Robbie Coltrane, Ralph Fiennes, Michael Gambon, Brendan Gleeson, Jason Isaacs, Gary Oldman, Alan Rickman, Maggie Smith and Timothy Spall	Mike Newell	$290,281,180
3.	War of the Worlds	Paramount Pictures	Tom Cruise, Dakota Fanning, Miranda Otto and Tim Robbins	Steven Spielberg	$234,280,354
4.	The Chronicles of Narnia: The Lion, the Witch and the Wardrobe	Buena Vista Pictures Distribution	William Moseley, Anna Popplewell, Skandar Keynes, Georgie Henley, Tilda Swinton, James McAvoy, Jim Broadbent and Liam Neeson	Andrew Adamson	$209,440,087
5.	Wedding Crashers	New Line Cinema	Owen Wilson, Vince Vaughn, Christopher Walken, Rachel McAdams, Isla Fisher, Bradley Cooper and Jane Seymour	David Dobkin	$209,253,921
6.	Charlie and the Chocolate Factory	Warner Bros. Pictures	Johnny Depp, Freddie Highmore, David Kelly, Helena Bonham Carter, Noah Taylor, Missi Pyle, James Fox, Deep Roy and Christopher Lee	Tim Burton	$206,459,076
7.	Batman Begins	Warner Bros. Pictures	Christian Bale, Michael Caine, Liam Neeson, Katie Holmes, Gary Oldman, Cillian Murphy, Tom Wilkinson, Rutger Hauer, Ken Watanabe and Morgan Freeman	Christopher Nolan	$205,343,774
8.	Madagascar	DreamWorks Pictures	voices of Ben Stiller, Chris Rock, David Schwimmer, Jada Pinkett Smith, Sacha Baron Cohen, Cedric the Entertainer, Andy Richter, Tom McGrath, Christopher Knights, Chris Miller and Conrad Vernon	Eric Darnell and Tom McGrath	$193,595,521
9.	Mr. & Mrs. Smith	20th Century Fox	Brad Pitt, Angelina Jolie, Adam Brody and Kerry Washington	Doug Liman	$186,336,279
10.	Hitch	Sony Pictures Releasing	Will Smith, Eva Mendes, Kevin James, Amber Valletta, Michael Rapaport and Adam Arkin	Andy Tennant	$179,495,555

=== In-Year Release ===
Highest-grossing films of 2005 by In-year release
Rank	Title	Distributor	Domestic Gross
1.	Star Wars: Episode III – Revenge of the Sith	20th Century Fox	$380,270,577
2.	The Chronicles of Narnia: The Lion, the Witch and the Wardrobe	Disney	$291,710,957
3.	Harry Potter and the Goblet of Fire	Warner Bros.	$290,013,036
4.	War of the Worlds	Paramount / DreamWorks	$234,280,354
5.	King Kong	Universal	$218,080,025
6.	Wedding Crashers	New Line	$209,255,921
7.	Charlie and the Chocolate Factory	Warner Bros.	$206,459,076
8.	Batman Begins	Warner Bros.	$205,343,774
9.	Madagascar	DreamWorks	$193,595,521
10.	Mr. & Mrs. Smith	20th Century Fox	$186,336,279

Highest-grossing films by MPAA rating of 2005
G	Chicken Little
PG	The Chronicles of Narnia: The Lion, the Witch and the Wardrobe
PG-13	Star Wars: Episode III – Revenge of the Sith
R	Wedding Crashers

== See also ==
- List of American films — American films by year
- List of box office number-one films

== Chronology ==
Preceded by 2004	2005	Succeeded by 2006
