= List of 2012 box office number-one films in the United States =

This is a list of films which placed number one at the weekend box office for the year 2012.

== Number-one films ==
†	This implies the highest-grossing movie of the year.

#	Weekend end date	Film	Gross	Notes	Ref
1	January 8, 2012	The Devil Inside	$33,732,515		
2	January 15, 2012	Contraband	$24,349,815		
3	January 22, 2012	Underworld: Awakening	$25,306,725		
4	January 29, 2012	The Grey	$19,665,101		
5	February 5, 2012	Chronicle	$22,004,098	Chronicle broke Jaws's record ($7 million) for the highest opening debut for a young filmmaker.	
6	February 12, 2012	The Vow	$41,202,458	The Vow broke Hitch's record ($7.5 million) for the highest mid-week Valentine's Day gross with $11.6 million.	
7	February 19, 2012	Safe House	$23,641,575	Safe House reached #1 in its second weekend of release.	
8	February 26, 2012	Act of Valor	$24,476,632		
9	March 4, 2012	The Lorax	$70,217,070	The Lorax broke Tangled's records ($48.8 million) for the highest weekend debuts for a musical film and for an animated musical film.	
10	March 11, 2012	The Lorax	$38,846,020		
11	March 18, 2012	21 Jump Street	$36,302,612		
12	March 25, 2012	The Hunger Games	$152,535,747	The Hunger Games broke Alice in Wonderland's records ($116.1 million) for the highest weekend debut in March, for a non-sequel, and for a spring release. It also broke The Twilight Saga: New Moon's record ($142.8 million) for highest weekend debut for a film featuring a female protagonist. It also broke The Day After Tomorrow record ($68 million) for the highest debut for a Lionsgate film and Madea Goes to Jail record ($41 million) for the highest debut for a film disturbed by lionsgate.	
13	April 1, 2012	The Hunger Games	$58,551,063		
14	April 8, 2012	The Hunger Games	$33,111,557		
15	April 15, 2012	The Hunger Games	$21,096,824	The Hunger Games became the first film since Avatar to top the box office for four consecutive weekends. It also became the first film since The Help to top the box office in its fourth weekend.	
16	April 22, 2012	Think Like a Man	$33,636,303		
17	April 29, 2012	Think Like a Man	$17,604,141		
18	May 6, 2012	The Avengers †	$207,438,708	The Avengers broke Spider-Man 3's record ($151.1 million) for the highest weekend debut in May. It also broke The Dark Knight's record ($158.4 million) for the highest weekend debut for a superhero film as well as Harry Potter and the Deathly Hallows – Part 2's records ($169.2 million) for the highest weekend debut for a summer release, a 3D film, and of all-time. It also became the first film to gross $200 million in one weekend. The Avengers had the highest weekend debut of 2012.	
19	May 13, 2012	The Avengers †	$103,052,274	The Avengers broke Avatar's record ($75.6 million) for the highest second weekend gross of all-time, and also became the first film to gross $100 million in its second weekend of release.	
20	May 20, 2012	The Avengers †	$55,644,102	The Avengers broke The Dark Knight's record (27 days) for the fastest film to reach $450 million domestically.	
21	May 27, 2012	Men in Black 3	$54,592,779		
22	June 3, 2012	Snow White & the Huntsman	$56,217,700		
23	June 10, 2012	Madagascar 3: Europe's Most Wanted	$60,316,738		
24	June 17, 2012	Madagascar 3: Europe's Most Wanted	$34,055,474		
25	June 24, 2012	Brave	$66,323,594		
26	July 1, 2012	Ted	$54,415,205	Ted broke The Hangover's record ($45 million) for the highest weekend debut for an original R-rated comedy.	
27	July 8, 2012	The Amazing Spider-Man	$62,004,688	The Amazing Spider-Man's $35 million Tuesday gross broke Transformers' record ($27.8 million) for the highest Tuesday gross of all time.	
28	July 15, 2012	Ice Age: Continental Drift	$46,629,259		
29	July 22, 2012	The Dark Knight Rises	$160,887,295	The Dark Knight Rises's $2.3 million midnight gross in IMAX broke Harry Potter and the Deathly Hallows – Part 2's record ($2 million) for the highest midnight gross in IMAX. It also broke The Dark Knight's record ($158.4 million) for the highest weekend debut for a non-3D film.	
30	July 29, 2012	The Dark Knight Rises	$62,101,451		
31	August 5, 2012	The Dark Knight Rises	$35,737,330		
32	August 12, 2012	The Bourne Legacy	$38,142,825		
33	August 19, 2012	The Expendables 2	$28,591,370		
34	August 26, 2012	The Expendables 2	$13,423,579		
35	September 2, 2012	The Possession	$17,732,480		
36	September 9, 2012	The Possession	$9,317,472		
37	September 16, 2012	Resident Evil: Retribution	$21,052,227		
38	September 23, 2012	End of Watch	$13,152,683	Initial estimates had End of Watch tied with House at the End of the Street.	
39	September 30, 2012	Hotel Transylvania	$42,522,194	Hotel Transylvania broke Sweet Home Alabama's record ($35.6 million) for the highest weekend debut in September.	
40	October 7, 2012	Taken 2	$49,514,769		
41	October 14, 2012	Taken 2	$21,873,127		
42	October 21, 2012	Paranormal Activity 4	$29,003,866		
43	October 28, 2012	Argo	$12,085,059	Argo reached #1 in its third weekend of release.	
44	November 4, 2012	Wreck-It Ralph	$49,038,712	Wreck-It Ralph broke Tangled's record ($48.8 million) for the highest weekend debut for a Walt Disney Animation Studios film.	
45	November 11, 2012	Skyfall	$88,364,714	Skyfall broke Austin Powers in Goldmember's record ($73 million) for the highest weekend debut for a spy film.	
46	November 18, 2012	The Twilight Saga: Breaking Dawn – Part 2	$141,067,634		
47	November 25, 2012	The Twilight Saga: Breaking Dawn – Part 2	$43,641,448		
48	December 2, 2012	The Twilight Saga: Breaking Dawn – Part 2	$17,416,362		
49	December 9, 2012	Skyfall	$10,780,201	Skyfall reclaimed the #1 spot in its fifth weekend of release, making it the first film since How to Train Your Dragon to take the top spot in its fifth weekend.	
50	December 16, 2012	The Hobbit: An Unexpected Journey	$84,617,303	The Hobbit: An Unexpected Journey broke I Am Legend's record ($77.2 million) for the highest weekend debut in December.	
51	December 23, 2012	The Hobbit: An Unexpected Journey	$36,888,365		
52	December 30, 2012	The Hobbit: An Unexpected Journey	$31,926,068		

== Highest-grossing films ==
=== Calendar Gross ===
Highest-grossing films of 2012 by Calendar Gross

Rank	Title	Studio(s)	Actor(s)	Director(s)	Gross
1.	The Avengers	Walt Disney Studios	Robert Downey Jr., Chris Evans, Mark Ruffalo, Chris Hemsworth, Scarlett Johansson, Jeremy Renner, Tom Hiddleston, Clark Gregg, Cobie Smulders, Stellan Skarsgård and Samuel L. Jackson	Joss Whedon	$619,257,177
2.	The Dark Knight Rises	Warner Bros. Pictures	Christian Bale, Michael Caine, Gary Oldman, Anne Hathaway, Tom Hardy, Marion Cotillard, Joseph Gordon-Levitt and Morgan Freeman	Christopher Nolan	$448,139,099
3.	The Hunger Games	Lionsgate	Jennifer Lawrence, Josh Hutcherson, Liam Hemsworth, Woody Harrelson, Elizabeth Banks, Lenny Kravitz, Stanley Tucci and Donald Sutherland	Gary Ross	$408,010,692
4.	Skyfall	Columbia Pictures	Daniel Craig, Javier Bardem, Ralph Fiennes, Naomie Harris, Ben Whishaw, Bérénice Lim Marlohe, Albert Finney and Judi Dench	Sam Mendes	$288,704,271
5.	The Twilight Saga: Breaking Dawn – Part 2	Summit Entertainment	Kristen Stewart, Robert Pattinson, Taylor Lautner, Billy Burke, Peter Facinelli, Elizabeth Reaser, Kellan Lutz, Nikki Reed, Jackson Rathbone, Ashley Greene, Michael Sheen and Dakota Fanning	Bill Condon	$286,422,893
6.	The Amazing Spider-Man	Columbia Pictures	Andrew Garfield, Emma Stone, Rhys Ifans, Denis Leary, Campbell Scott, Irrfan Khan, Martin Sheen and Sally Field	Marc Webb	$261,569,291
7.	Brave	Walt Disney Studios	voices of Kelly Macdonald, Billy Connolly, Emma Thompson, Julie Walters, Robbie Coltrane, Kevin McKidd and Craig Ferguson	Mark Andrews and Brenda Chapman	$236,686,287
8.	The Hobbit: An Unexpected Journey	Warner Bros. Pictures	Ian McKellen, Martin Freeman, Richard Armitage, James Nesbitt, Ken Stott, Cate Blanchett, Ian Holm, Christopher Lee, Hugo Weaving, Elijah Wood and Andy Serkis	Peter Jackson	$228,546,604
9.	Ted	Universal Pictures	Mark Wahlberg, Mila Kunis, Seth MacFarlane, Joel McHale and Giovanni Ribisi	Seth MacFarlane	$218,815,487
10.	Madagascar 3: Europe's Most Wanted	Paramount Pictures	voices of Ben Stiller, Chris Rock, David Schwimmer, Jada Pinkett Smith, Sacha Baron Cohen, Cedric the Entertainer, Andy Richter, Tom McGrath, Jessica Chastain, Bryan Cranston, Martin Short and Frances McDormand	Eric Darnell, Conrad Vernon and Tom McGrath	$216,391,482

=== In-Year Release ===
Highest-grossing films of 2012 by In-year release
Rank	Title	Distributor	Domestic gross
1.	The Avengers	Disney	$623,357,910
2.	The Dark Knight Rises	Warner Bros.	$448,139,099
3.	The Hunger Games	Lionsgate	$408,010,692
4.	Skyfall	Sony	$304,360,277
5.	The Hobbit: An Unexpected Journey	Warner Bros.	$303,003,568
6.	The Twilight Saga: Breaking Dawn – Part 2	Summit	$292,324,737
7.	The Amazing Spider-Man	Sony	$262,030,663
8.	Brave	Disney	$237,283,207
9.	Ted	Universal	$218,815,487
10.	Madagascar 3: Europe's Most Wanted	Paramount	$216,391,482

Highest-grossing films by MPAA rating of 2012
G	Beauty and the Beast (3-D Re-issue)
PG	Brave
PG-13	The Avengers
R	Ted

== See also ==
- List of American films — American films by year
- List of box office number-one films

== Chronology ==
Preceded by 2011	2012	Succeeded by 2013
