= List of 2014 box office number-one films in the United States =

This is a list of films which placed number one at the weekend box office for the year 2014.

== Number-one films ==
†	This implies the highest-grossing movie of the year.

#	Weekend end date	Film	Gross	Notes	Ref
1	January 5, 2014	Frozen	$19,575,525	Frozen reclaimed the #1 spot in its sixth overall weekend of release, and also became the first film since Avatar to take the top spot in its sixth weekend.	
2	January 12, 2014	Lone Survivor	$37,849,910	Lone Survivor reached the #1 spot after two weekends of limited release.	
3	January 19, 2014	Ride Along	$41,516,170	Ride Along broke Cloverfield's two records ($40.1 million) for the highest weekend debut in January and for the highest Martin Luther King Jr. Day three-day weekend debut.	
4	January 26, 2014	Ride Along	$21,299,495		
5	February 2, 2014	Ride Along	$12,035,720	Ride Along became the first film of 2014 to top the box office for three consecutive weekends.	
6	February 9, 2014	The Lego Movie	$69,050,279		
7	February 16, 2014	The Lego Movie	$49,846,430		
8	February 23, 2014	The Lego Movie	$31,305,359	The Lego Movie and Ride Along became the first two films to win at least three consecutive weekends in a row since The Dark Knight and Tropic Thunder in 2008. The former also became the first animated film since Shrek Forever After to top the box office for three consecutive weekends.	
9	March 2, 2014	Non-Stop	$28,875,635		
10	March 9, 2014	300: Rise of an Empire	$45,038,460		
11	March 16, 2014	Mr. Peabody & Sherman	$21,809,249	Mr. Peabody & Sherman reached the #1 spot in its second weekend of release.	
12	March 23, 2014	Divergent	$54,607,747		
13	March 30, 2014	Noah	$43,720,472		
14	April 6, 2014	Captain America: The Winter Soldier	$95,023,721	Captain America: The Winter Soldier broke Fast Five's record ($86.2 million) for the highest weekend debut in April.	
15	April 13, 2014	Captain America: The Winter Soldier	$41,274,861		
16	April 20, 2014	Captain America: The Winter Soldier	$25,587,056		
17	April 27, 2014	The Other Woman	$24,763,752		
18	May 4, 2014	The Amazing Spider-Man 2	$91,608,337		
19	May 11, 2014	Neighbors	$49,033,915		
20	May 18, 2014	Godzilla	$93,188,384	Godzilla broke The Lost World: Jurassic Park's record ($72.1 million) for the highest weekend debut for a creature feature film and The Day After Tomorrow's record ($68.7 million) for the highest weekend debut for a disaster film.	
21	May 25, 2014	X-Men: Days of Future Past	$90,823,660		
22	June 1, 2014	Maleficent	$69,431,298		
23	June 8, 2014	The Fault in Our Stars	$48,002,523		
24	June 15, 2014	22 Jump Street	$57,071,445	Along with The Lego Movie, directors Phil Lord and Christopher Miller became the first directors to open two films in the same year with a $50 million debut each.	
25	June 22, 2014	Think Like a Man Too	$29,241,911	Along with Ride Along, director Tim Story became the first African American director to have two films in the same year reach #1 during their weekend debuts.	
26	June 29, 2014	Transformers: Age of Extinction	$100,038,390 (Note: The $100 million opening for Transformers: Age of Extinction is disputed within the industry. According to Rentrak—which collected 97 percent of the grosses—the total for the three-day opening weekend is $97.76 million. For Transformers to have crossed the $100 million threshold, the remaining 3 percent of grosses collected by Paramount Pictures would have needed to be three times the national average. Some media outlets have elected to go with the Rentrak figure.)		
27	July 6, 2014	Transformers: Age of Extinction	$37,050,185	Transformers: Age of Extinction became the first summer film of 2014 to stay at number one at the box office for two consecutive weeks.	
28	July 13, 2014	Dawn of the Planet of the Apes	$72,611,427		
29	July 20, 2014	Dawn of the Planet of the Apes	$36,254,310		
30	July 27, 2014	Lucy	$43,899,340		
31	August 3, 2014	Guardians of the Galaxy †	$94,320,883	Guardians of the Galaxy broke The Bourne Ultimatum's record ($69.3 million) for the highest weekend debut in August.	
32	August 10, 2014	Teenage Mutant Ninja Turtles	$65,575,105		
33	August 17, 2014	Teenage Mutant Ninja Turtles	$28,523,147		
34	August 24, 2014	Guardians of the Galaxy †	$17,202,212	Guardians of the Galaxy reclaimed the #1 spot in its fourth weekend of release, becoming the first film since The Hunger Games to take the top spot in its fourth weekend of release.	
35	August 31, 2014	Guardians of the Galaxy †	$17,082,262	Guardians of the Galaxy became the first film since Skyfall to take the top spot in its fifth weekend of release as well as the first film since Signs to top the box office for three nonconsecutive weekends.	
36	September 7, 2014	Guardians of the Galaxy †	$10,357,345	Guardians of the Galaxy became the first film since The Hunger Games to top the box office for four weekends. It also became the first film since Frozen to take the top spot in its sixth weekend, as well as the first film since The Passion of the Christ to top the box office for four nonconsecutive weekends.	
37	September 14, 2014	No Good Deed	$24,250,283		
38	September 21, 2014	The Maze Runner	$32,512,804		
39	September 28, 2014	The Equalizer	$34,137,828		
40	October 5, 2014	Gone Girl	$37,513,109		
41	October 12, 2014	Gone Girl	$26,406,134		
42	October 19, 2014	Fury	$23,702,421		
43	October 26, 2014	Ouija	$19,875,995		
44	November 2, 2014	Ouija	$10,740,980	Initial estimates had Nightcrawler ahead of Ouija.	
45	November 9, 2014	Big Hero 6	$56,215,889		
46	November 16, 2014	Dumb and Dumber To	$36,111,775		
47	November 23, 2014	The Hunger Games: Mockingjay – Part 1	$121,897,634	The Hunger Games: Mockingjay – Part 1 had the highest weekend debut of 2014.	
48	November 30, 2014	The Hunger Games: Mockingjay – Part 1	$56,972,599		
49	December 7, 2014	The Hunger Games: Mockingjay – Part 1	$22,026,762		
50	December 14, 2014	Exodus: Gods and Kings	$24,115,934		
51	December 21, 2014	The Hobbit: The Battle of the Five Armies	$54,724,334		
52	December 28, 2014	The Hobbit: The Battle of the Five Armies	$40,921,395	In second place, Into the Woods' $31.1 million opening weekend broke Mamma Mia!'s record ($27.8 million) for the highest weekend debut for a film based on a Broadway musical.	

== Highest-grossing films ==
=== Calendar Gross ===
Highest-grossing films of 2014 by Calendar Gross

Rank	Title	Studio(s)	Actor(s)	Director(s)	Gross
1.	Guardians of the Galaxy	Walt Disney Studios	Chris Pratt, Zoe Saldaña, Dave Bautista, Vin Diesel, Bradley Cooper, Lee Pace, Michael Rooker, Karen Gillan, Djimon Hounsou, John C. Reilly, Glenn Close and Benicio del Toro	James Gunn	$328,095,589
2.	The Hunger Games: Mockingjay – Part 1	Lionsgate	Jennifer Lawrence, Josh Hutcherson, Liam Hemsworth, Woody Harrelson, Elizabeth Banks, Julianne Moore, Philip Seymour Hoffman, Jeffrey Wright, Stanley Tucci and Donald Sutherland	Francis Lawrence	$313,282,914
3.	Captain America: The Winter Soldier	Walt Disney Studios	Chris Evans, Scarlett Johansson, Sebastian Stan, Anthony Mackie, Cobie Smulders, Frank Grillo, Emily VanCamp, Hayley Atwell, Toby Jones, Jenny Agutter, Robert Redford and Samuel L. Jackson	Anthony Russo and Joe Russo	$259,766,572
4.	The Lego Movie	Warner Bros. Pictures	voices of Chris Pratt, Will Ferrell, Elizabeth Banks, Will Arnett, Nick Offerman, Alison Brie, Charlie Day, Liam Neeson and Morgan Freeman	Phil Lord and Christopher Miller	$257,760,692
5.	Transformers: Age of Extinction	Paramount Pictures	Mark Wahlberg, Jack Reynor, Nicola Peltz, Kelsey Grammer, Sophia Myles, Bingbing Li, Titus Welliver, T. J. Miller and Stanley Tucci	Michael Bay	$245,438,974
6.	Maleficent	Walt Disney Studios	Angelina Jolie, Sharlto Copley, Elle Fanning, Sam Riley, Imelda Staunton, Juno Temple and Lesley Manville	Robert Stromberg	$236,412,469
7.	X-Men: Days of Future Past	20th Century Fox	Hugh Jackman, James McAvoy, Michael Fassbender, Jennifer Lawrence, Halle Berry, Anna Paquin, Elliot Page, Peter Dinklage, Ian McKellen and Patrick Stewart	Bryan Singer	$233,904,517
8.	Dawn of the Planet of the Apes	20th Century Fox	Andy Serkis, Jason Clarke, Gary Oldman, Keri Russell, Toby Kebbell and Kodi Smit-McPhee	Matt Reeves	$208,491,141
9.	Big Hero 6	Walt Disney Studios	voices of Scott Adsit, Ryan Potter, Daniel Henney, T. J. Miller, Jamie Chung, Damon Wayans Jr., Génesis Rodríguez, James Cromwell, Maya Rudolph and Alan Tudyk	Don Hall and Chris Williams	$204,576,654
10.	The Amazing Spider-Man 2	Columbia Pictures	Andrew Garfield, Emma Stone, Jamie Foxx, Dane DeHaan, Campbell Scott, Embeth Davidtz, Colm Feore, Paul Giamatti and Sally Field	Marc Webb	$201,911,219

=== In-Year Release ===
Highest-grossing films of 2014 by In-year release
Rank	Title	Distributor	Domestic gross
1.	American Sniper	Warner Bros.	$350,126,372
2.	The Hunger Games: Mockingjay – Part 1	Lionsgate	$337,135,885
3.	Guardians of the Galaxy	Disney	$333,176,600
4.	Captain America: The Winter Soldier	Disney	$259,766,572
5.	The Lego Movie	Warner Bros.	$257,760,692
6.	The Hobbit: The Battle of the Five Armies	Warner Bros.	$255,119,788
7.	Transformers: Age of Extinction	Paramount	$245,439,076
8.	Maleficent	Disney	$241,410,378
9.	X-Men: Days of Future Past	Fox	$233,921,534
10.	Big Hero 6	Disney	$222,527,828

Highest-grossing films by MPAA rating of 2014
G	Rio 2
PG	The Lego Movie
PG-13	The Hunger Games: Mockingjay – Part 1
R	American Sniper

== See also ==
- List of American films – American films by year
- List of box office number-one films

== Chronology ==
Preceded by 2013	2014	Succeeded by 2015
