= List of 2007 box office number-one films in the United States =

This is a list of films which have placed number one at the weekend box office in the United States during 2007.

== Number-one films ==
| † | This implies the highest-grossing movie of the year. |

| # | Weekend end date | Film | Gross | Notes | Ref |
|---|---|---|---|---|---|
| 1 | January 7, 2007 | Night at the Museum | $23,743,960 | | |
| 2 | January 14, 2007 | Stomp the Yard | $21,833,312 | | |
| 3 | January 21, 2007 | Stomp the Yard | $12,287,352 | | |
| 4 | January 28, 2007 | Epic Movie | $18,612,544 | | |
| 5 | February 4, 2007 | The Messengers | $14,713,321 | | |
| 6 | February 11, 2007 | Norbit | $34,195,434 | | |
| 7 | February 18, 2007 | Ghost Rider | $45,388,836 | Ghost Rider broke Daredevil's record ($40.3 million) for the highest President's Day weekend debut. | |
| 8 | February 25, 2007 | Ghost Rider | $20,067,443 | | |
| 9 | March 4, 2007 | Wild Hogs | $39,699,023 | | |
| 10 | March 11, 2007 | 300 | $70,885,301 | 300 broke Ice Age: The Meltdown's records ($68 million) for the highest weekend debut in March and for a spring release. | |
| 11 | March 18, 2007 | 300 | $32,877,328 | | |
| 12 | March 25, 2007 | TMNT | $24,255,205 | | |
| 13 | April 1, 2007 | Blades of Glory | $33,014,202 | | |
| 14 | April 8, 2007 | Blades of Glory | $22,522,330 | | |
| 15 | April 15, 2007 | Disturbia | $22,224,982 | | |
| 16 | April 22, 2007 | Disturbia | $13,010,778 | | |
| 17 | April 29, 2007 | Disturbia | $9,023,835 | | |
| 18 | May 6, 2007 | Spider-Man 3 † | $151,116,516 | Spider-Man 3's opening day gross of $59.8 million broke Pirates of the Caribbean: Dead Man's Chest's record ($55.8 million) for the highest single-day tally of all time. It also broke Pirates of the Caribbean: Dead Man's Chest's records ($135.6 million) for the highest weekend debut for a summer release, for a PG-13 rated film, and of all-time as well as Spider-Man's records ($114.8 million) for the highest weekend debut in May, for a superhero film, and a Sony film. Spider-Man 3 was the first film ever to gross more than $150 million in one weekend (3 days). Spider-Man 3 had the highest weekend debut of 2007. | |
| 19 | May 13, 2007 | Spider-Man 3 † | $58,166,256 | | |
| 20 | May 20, 2007 | Shrek the Third | $121,629,270 | Shrek the Third broke Shrek 2's records ($108 million) for the highest weekend debut for an animated film and a PG-rated film. | |
| 21 | May 27, 2007 | Pirates of the Caribbean: At World's End | $114,732,820 | Pirates of the Caribbean: At World's End and Shrek the Third became the first two films in history to bring in over $100 million over two consecutive weekends. The former also broke X-Men: The Last Stand's record ($102.8 million) for the highest Memorial Day weekend debut. | |
| 22 | June 3, 2007 | Pirates of the Caribbean: At World's End | $44,206,660 | | |
| 23 | June 10, 2007 | Ocean's Thirteen | $36,133,403 | | |
| 24 | June 17, 2007 | Fantastic Four: Rise of the Silver Surfer | $58,051,684 | | |
| 25 | June 24, 2007 | Evan Almighty | $31,192,615 | | |
| 26 | July 1, 2007 | Ratatouille | $47,027,395 | | |
| 27 | July 8, 2007 | Transformers | $70,502,384 | Transformers' $27.8 million opening day gross broke Pirates of the Caribbean: Dead Man's Chest's record ($15.7 million) for the highest Tuesday gross of all time. | |
| 28 | July 15, 2007 | Harry Potter and the Order of the Phoenix | $77,108,414 | Harry Potter and the Order of the Phoenix's $44.2 million Wednesday gross broke Spider-Man 2's record ($40.4 million) for the highest Wednesday gross of all time. | |
| 29 | July 22, 2007 | I Now Pronounce You Chuck & Larry | $34,233,750 | In third place, Hairspray's $27.5 million opening weekend broke Dreamgirls' records ($14.1 million) for the highest weekend debuts for a film based on a Broadway musical and for a live-action musical film. | |
| 30 | July 29, 2007 | The Simpsons Movie | $74,036,787 | The Simpsons Movie broke Mission: Impossible 2's record ($57.8 million) for highest weekend debut for a film based on a television show. It also broke The Incredibles' record ($70.4 million) for the highest weekend debut for a non-sequel animated film. | |
| 31 | August 5, 2007 | The Bourne Ultimatum | $69,283,690 | The Bourne Ultimatum broke Rush Hour 2's record ($67.4 million) for the highest weekend debut in August. | |
| 32 | August 12, 2007 | Rush Hour 3 | $49,100,158 | | |
| 33 | August 19, 2007 | Superbad | $33,052,411 | | |
| 34 | August 26, 2007 | Superbad | $18,044,369 | | |
| 35 | September 2, 2007 | Halloween | $26,362,367 | Halloween broke Transporter 2's record ($16.5 million) for the highest Labor Day weekend debut, and The Sixth Sense's record ($22.9 million) for the highest Labor Day weekend ever. | |
| 36 | September 9, 2007 | 3:10 to Yuma | $14,035,033 | | |
| 37 | September 16, 2007 | The Brave One | $13,471,488 | | |
| 38 | September 23, 2007 | Resident Evil: Extinction | $23,678,580 | | |
| 39 | September 30, 2007 | The Game Plan | $22,950,971 | | |
| 40 | October 7, 2007 | The Game Plan | $16,609,377 | | |
| 41 | October 14, 2007 | Why Did I Get Married? | $21,353,789 | | |
| 42 | October 21, 2007 | 30 Days of Night | $15,951,902 | | |
| 43 | October 28, 2007 | Saw IV | $31,756,764 | | |
| 44 | November 4, 2007 | American Gangster | $43,565,115 | | |
| 45 | November 11, 2007 | Bee Movie | $25,565,462 | Bee Movie reached #1 in its second weekend of release. | |
| 46 | November 18, 2007 | Beowulf | $27,515,871 | | |
| 47 | November 25, 2007 | Enchanted | $34,440,317 | Enchanted broke Hairspray's record ($27.5 million) for the highest weekend debut for a live-action musical film. | |
| 48 | December 2, 2007 | Enchanted | $16,403,316 | | |
| 49 | December 9, 2007 | The Golden Compass | $25,783,232 | | |
| 50 | December 16, 2007 | I Am Legend | $77,211,321 | I Am Legend broke The Lord of the Rings: The Return of the King's record ($72.6 million) for the highest weekend debut in December. | |
| 51 | December 23, 2007 | National Treasure: Book of Secrets | $44,783,772 | | |
| 52 | December 30, 2007 | National Treasure: Book of Secrets | $35,672,708 | | |

== Highest-grossing films ==
=== Calendar Gross ===
Highest-grossing films of 2007 by Calendar Gross

| Rank | Title | Studio | Actor(s) | Director(s) | Gross |
|---|---|---|---|---|---|
| 1. | Spider-Man 3 | Columbia Pictures | Tobey Maguire, Kirsten Dunst, James Franco, Thomas Haden Church, Topher Grace, Bryce Dallas Howard, James Cromwell, Rosemary Harris and J. K. Simmons | Sam Raimi | $336,530,303 |
| 2. | Shrek the Third | Paramount Pictures | voices of Mike Myers, Eddie Murphy, Cameron Diaz, Antonio Banderas, Julie Andrews, John Cleese, Rupert Everett, Eric Idle and Justin Timberlake | Chris Miller | $322,719,944 |
| 3. | Transformers | Paramount Pictures | Shia LaBeouf, Tyrese Gibson, Josh Duhamel, Anthony Anderson, Megan Fox, Rachael Taylor, John Turturro, Jon Voight, Peter Cullen and Hugo Weaving | Michael Bay | $319,246,193 |
| 4. | Pirates of the Caribbean: At World's End | Walt Disney Studios | Johnny Depp, Orlando Bloom, Keira Knightley, Stellan Skarsgård, Bill Nighy, Chow Yun-Fat, Geoffrey Rush, Tom Hollander, Jack Davenport, Kevin R. McNally and Jonathan Pryce | Gore Verbinski | $309,420,425 |
| 5. | Harry Potter and the Order of the Phoenix | Warner Bros. Pictures | Daniel Radcliffe, Rupert Grint, Emma Watson, Helena Bonham Carter, Robbie Coltrane, Warwick Davis, Ralph Fiennes, Michael Gambon, Brendan Gleeson, Richard Griffiths, Jason Isaacs, Gary Oldman, Alan Rickman, Fiona Shaw, Maggie Smith, Imelda Staunton, David Thewlis, Emma Thompson and Julie Walters | David Yates | $292,004,738 |
| 6. | The Bourne Ultimatum | Universal Pictures | Matt Damon, Julia Stiles, David Strathairn, Scott Glenn, Paddy Considine, Édgar Ramírez, Albert Finney and Joan Allen | Paul Greengrass | $227,471,070 |
| 7. | 300 | Warner Bros. Pictures | Gerard Butler, Lena Headey, David Wenham and Dominic West | Zack Snyder | $210,614,939 |
| 8. | Ratatouille | Walt Disney Studios | voices of Patton Oswalt, Ian Holm, Lou Romano, Janeane Garofalo, Brad Garrett, Peter O'Toole, Brian Dennehy, Peter Sohn and Will Arnett | Brad Bird | $206,445,654 |
| 9. | I Am Legend | Warner Bros. Pictures | Will Smith, Alice Braga, Charlie Tahan and Dash Mihok | Francis Lawrence | $199,345,154 |
| 10. | The Simpsons Movie | 20th Century Fox | voices of Dan Castellaneta, Julie Kavner, Nancy Cartwright, Yeardley Smith, Hank Azaria, Harry Shearer, Pamela Hayden, Tress MacNeille, Karl Wiedergott, Marcia Wallace, Maggie Roswell, Russi Taylor, Joe Mantegna and Albert Brooks | David Silverman | $183,135,014 |

=== In-Year Release ===
Highest-grossing films of 2007 by In-year release
| Rank | Title | Distributor | Domestic gross |
|---|---|---|---|
| 1. | Spider-Man 3 | Columbia Pictures | $336,530,303 |
| 2. | Shrek the Third | Paramount Pictures | $322,719,944 |
| 3. | Transformers | Paramount Pictures | $319,246,193 |
| 4. | Pirates of the Caribbean: At World's End | Walt Disney Pictures | $309,420,425 |
| 5. | Harry Potter and the Order of the Phoenix | Warner Bros. | $292,004,738 |
| 6. | I Am Legend | Warner Bros. | $256,393,010 |
| 7. | The Bourne Ultimatum | Universal Studios | $227,471,070 |
| 8. | National Treasure: Book of Secrets | Walt Disney Pictures | $219,964,115 |
| 9. | Alvin and the Chipmunks | 20th Century Fox | $217,326,974 |
| 10. | 300 | Warner Bros. | $210,614,939 |

Highest-grossing films by MPAA rating of 2007
| G | Ratatouille |
| PG | Shrek the Third |
| PG-13 | Spider-Man 3 |
| R | 300 |

== See also ==
- List of American films — American films by year
- Lists of box office number-one films

== Chronology ==
| Preceded by 2006 | 2007 | Succeeded by 2008 |
