= List of 2015 box office number-one films in the United States =

This is a list of films which placed number one at the weekend box office for the year 2015.

== Number-one films ==
†	This implies the highest-grossing movie of the year.

#	Weekend end date	Film	Gross	Notes	Refs
1	January 4, 2015	The Hobbit: The Battle of the Five Armies	$21,732,090		
2	January 11, 2015	Taken 3	$39,201,657		
3	January 18, 2015	American Sniper	$89,269,066	American Sniper reached #1 for its wide-debut, after three weekends of limited (four theaters) release. It also broke Ride Along's records ($41.5 million) for the highest weekend debut in January, which was also the highest Martin Luther King Jr. Day three-day weekend debut. The film also broke two records Avatar had set, for the highest overall weekend gross in January ($68.4 million) and for the Martin Luther King weekend ($42.7 million). It also broke The Passion of the Christ's record ($83.8 million) for the highest weekend debut for a winter release.	
4	January 25, 2015	American Sniper	$64,628,304	In addition to breaking The Hangover Part II's record (3,675 theaters) for the widest release for an R-rated film (3,705); American Sniper's second weekend also broke The Passion of the Christ's record ($53.2 million) for the biggest second weekend gross for an R-rated film.	
5	February 1, 2015	American Sniper	$30,660,528	American Sniper became the first film in 2015 to top the box office for three consecutive weekends.	
6	February 8, 2015	The SpongeBob Movie: Sponge Out of Water	$55,365,012		
7	February 15, 2015	Fifty Shades of Grey	$85,171,450	Fifty Shades of Grey broke The Passion of the Christ's record ($83.8 million) for the highest weekend debut in February and Valentine's Day's record ($63.1 million) for the highest President's Day weekend debut. It also broke Twilight's record ($69.6 million) for the highest weekend debut for a female-directed film.	
8	February 22, 2015	Fifty Shades of Grey	$22,259,030		
9	March 1, 2015	Focus	$18,685,137		
10	March 8, 2015	Chappie	$13,346,782		
11	March 15, 2015	Cinderella	$67,877,361		
12	March 22, 2015	The Divergent Series: Insurgent	$52,263,680		
13	March 29, 2015	Home	$52,107,731		
14	April 5, 2015	Furious 7	$147,187,040	Furious 7 broke Captain America: The Winter Soldier's record ($95 million) for the highest weekend debut in April and Clash of the Titans' record ($61.2 million) for the highest Easter weekend debut.	
15	April 12, 2015	Furious 7	$59,585,930		
16	April 19, 2015	Furious 7	$29,156,595	During the week, Furious 7 broke Avatar's record (19 days) for the fastest film to gross $1 billion worldwide, crossing the mark in 17 days.	
17	April 26, 2015	Furious 7	$17,821,440	Furious 7 became the first film since The Hunger Games to top the box office for four consecutive weekends. It also became the first film since Guardians of the Galaxy to top the box office in its fourth week of release.	
18	May 3, 2015	Avengers: Age of Ultron	$191,271,109	Avengers: Age of Ultron's $3 million gross from Thursday preview showings in IMAX broke The Dark Knight Rises' record ($2.3 million) for the highest grossing Thursday from IMAX showings of all-time.	
19	May 10, 2015	Avengers: Age of Ultron	$77,746,929		
20	May 17, 2015	Pitch Perfect 2	$69,216,890	Pitch Perfect 2 broke High School Musical 3: Senior Year's record ($42 million) for the highest weekend debut for a live-action musical film.	
21	May 24, 2015	Tomorrowland	$33,028,165		
22	May 31, 2015	San Andreas	$54,588,173		
23	June 7, 2015	Spy	$29,085,719		
24	June 14, 2015	Jurassic World †	$208,806,270	Jurassic World broke Man of Steel's record ($116.6 million) for the highest weekend debut in June and Godzilla's record ($93.2 million) for the highest weekend debut for a creature feature film. It also broke The Avengers' records ($207.4 million) for the highest weekend debuts for a summer release, a 3D film, a PG-13 rated film, and of all-time.	
25	June 21, 2015	Jurassic World †	$106,588,440	Jurassic World broke The Avengers' record ($103.1 million) for the highest second-weekend gross of all-time. In second place, Inside Out's $90.4 million opening weekend broke The Day After Tomorrow's record ($68.7 million) for the highest weekend debut for a film that did not open in first place, Avatar's record ($77 million) for the highest weekend debut for an original film, and The Simpsons Movie's record ($74 million) for the highest weekend debut for a non-sequel animated feature.	
26	June 28, 2015	Jurassic World †	$54,532,615	During the week, Jurassic World broke Furious 7's record (17 days) for the fastest film to gross $1 billion worldwide, crossing the mark in 13 days.	
27	July 5, 2015	Inside Out	$29,771,224	Inside Out reached the #1 spot in its third weekend of release. Initial estimates had Jurassic World ahead of Inside Out.	
28	July 12, 2015	Minions	$115,718,405	Minions' $46.2 million opening day gross broke Toy Story 3's record ($41.1 million) for the highest opening day gross for an animated film. It also broke Star Wars: Episode III – Revenge of the Sith's record ($108.4 million) for the highest weekend debut for a prequel.	
29	July 19, 2015	Ant-Man	$57,225,526		
30	July 26, 2015	Ant-Man	$24,909,332		
31	August 2, 2015	Mission: Impossible – Rogue Nation	$55,520,089		
32	August 9, 2015	Mission: Impossible – Rogue Nation	$28,502,372		
33	August 16, 2015	Straight Outta Compton	$60,200,180	Straight Outta Compton broke Walk the Line's records ($22.3 million) for the highest weekend debut for a music biopic and for biopic. It also American Pie 2's record ($45.1 million) for highest grossing opening weekend in August for an R-rated film.	
34	August 23, 2015	Straight Outta Compton	$26,364,020		
35	August 30, 2015	Straight Outta Compton	$13,133,560		
36	September 6, 2015	War Room	$9,480,535	War Room reached the #1 spot in its second weekend of release.	
37	September 13, 2015	The Perfect Guy	$25,888,154		
38	September 20, 2015	Maze Runner: The Scorch Trials	$30,316,510		
39	September 27, 2015	Hotel Transylvania 2	$48,464,322	Hotel Transylvania 2 broke Hotel Transylvania's record ($42.5 million) for the highest weekend debut in September.	
40	October 4, 2015	The Martian	$54,308,575		
41	October 11, 2015	The Martian	$37,005,266		
42	October 18, 2015	Goosebumps	$23,618,556		
43	October 25, 2015	The Martian	$15,732,907	The Martian reclaimed the #1 spot in its fourth weekend of release, making it the first film since Furious 7 to top the box office in its fourth weekend and the first film since Guardians of the Galaxy to top the box office for three nonconsecutive weekends.	
44	November 1, 2015	The Martian	$11,715,097	The Martian became the first film since Furious 7 to top the box office for four weekends as well as the first film since Guardians of the Galaxy to top the box office in its fifth weekend and for four nonconsecutive weekends.	
45	November 8, 2015	Spectre	$70,403,148		
46	November 15, 2015	Spectre	$33,681,104		
47	November 22, 2015	The Hunger Games: Mockingjay – Part 2	$102,665,981		
48	November 29, 2015	The Hunger Games: Mockingjay – Part 2	$52,004,595	In third place, Creed's $30.1 million opening weekend broke Real Steel's record ($27.3 million) for the highest weekend debut for a boxing film.	
49	December 6, 2015	The Hunger Games: Mockingjay – Part 2	$18,857,547		
50	December 13, 2015	The Hunger Games: Mockingjay – Part 2	$11,413,316	The Hunger Games: Mockingjay – Part 2 became the first film since Furious 7 to top the box office for four consecutive weekends.	
51	December 20, 2015	Star Wars: The Force Awakens	$247,966,675	Star Wars: The Force Awakens' $57 million gross from Thursday night preview showings broke Harry Potter and the Deathly Hallows – Part 2's record ($43.5 million) for the highest grossing Thursday night gross of all-time, and its $5.7 million gross from Thursday night IMAX showings broke Avengers: Age of Ultron's record ($3 million) for the highest grossing Thursday from IMAX showings of all-time. Its $119.1 million opening day gross broke Harry Potter and the Deathly Hallows – Part 2's records ($91.1 million) for the highest single and opening day gross of all time. It also broke The Hobbit: An Unexpected Journey's record ($84.6 million) for the highest weekend debut in December, The Hunger Games: Catching Fire's record ($158 million) for the highest weekend debut in the holiday season, and Jurassic World's records ($208.8 million) for the highest weekend debuts for a 3D film, a PG-13 rated film, and of all-time. It had the highest weekend debut of 2015.	
52	December 27, 2015	Star Wars: The Force Awakens	$149,202,860	Star Wars: The Force Awakens broke Jurassic World's record ($106.6 million) for the highest second-weekend gross of all-time, and its $49.3 million gross on Christmas Day broke Sherlock Holmes' record ($24.6 million) for the highest grossing Christmas Day of all time. It also broke Jurassic World's record (13 days) for the fastest film to gross $1 billion worldwide, crossing the mark in 12 days.	

== Highest-grossing films ==
=== Calendar Gross ===
Highest-grossing films of 2015 by Calendar Gross

Rank	Title	Studio(s)	Actor(s)	Director(s)	Gross
1.	Jurassic World	Universal Pictures	Chris Pratt, Bryce Dallas Howard, Vincent D'Onofrio, Ty Simpkins, Nick Robinson, Omar Sy, BD Wong and Irrfan Khan	Colin Trevorrow	$652,270,595
2.	Star Wars: The Force Awakens	Walt Disney Studios	Harrison Ford, Mark Hamill, Carrie Fisher, Adam Driver, Daisy Ridley, John Boyega, Oscar Isaac, Lupita Nyong'o, Andy Serkis, Domhnall Gleeson, Anthony Daniels, Peter Mayhew and Max von Sydow	J. J. Abrams	$651,967,269
3.	Avengers: Age of Ultron	Walt Disney Studios	Robert Downey Jr., Chris Hemsworth, Mark Ruffalo, Chris Evans, Scarlett Johansson, Jeremy Renner, Don Cheadle, Aaron Taylor-Johnson, Elizabeth Olsen, Paul Bettany, Cobie Smulders, Anthony Mackie, Hayley Atwell, Idris Elba, Linda Cardellini, Stellan Skarsgård, James Spader and Samuel L. Jackson	Joss Whedon	$455,530,367
4.	Inside Out	Walt Disney Studios	voices of Amy Poehler, Phyllis Smith, Richard Kind, Lewis Black, Bill Hader, Mindy Kaling, Kaitlyn Dias, Diane Lane and Kyle MacLachlan	Pete Docter	$353,612,437
5.	Furious 7	Universal Pictures	Vin Diesel, Paul Walker, Dwayne Johnson, Michelle Rodriguez, Tyrese Gibson, Chris "Ludacris" Bridges, Jordana Brewster, Djimon Hounsou, Kurt Russell and Jason Statham	James Wan	$353,007,020
6.	American Sniper	Warner Bros. Pictures	Bradley Cooper and Sienna Miller	Clint Eastwood	$348,797,145
7.	Minions	Universal Pictures	voices of Sandra Bullock, Jon Hamm, Michael Keaton, Allison Janney, Steve Coogan, Jennifer Saunders, Pierre Coffin and Geoffrey Rush	Pierre Coffin and Kyle Balda	$336,045,770
8.	The Hunger Games: Mockingjay – Part 2	Lionsgate	Jennifer Lawrence, Josh Hutcherson, Liam Hemsworth, Woody Harrelson, Elizabeth Banks, Julianne Moore, Philip Seymour Hoffman, Jeffrey Wright, Stanley Tucci and Donald Sutherland	Francis Lawrence	$269,569,121
9.	The Martian	20th Century Fox	Matt Damon, Jessica Chastain, Kristen Wiig, Jeff Daniels, Michael Peña, Kate Mara, Sean Bean, Sebastian Stan, Aksel Hennie, Benedict Wong, Donald Glover and Chiwetel Ejiofor	Ridley Scott	$225,345,353
10.	Cinderella	Walt Disney Studios	Cate Blanchett, Lily James, Richard Madden, Stellan Skarsgård, Holliday Grainger, Derek Jacobi and Helena Bonham Carter	Kenneth Branagh	$197,584,850

=== In-Year Release ===
Highest-grossing films of 2015 by In-year release
Rank	Title	Distributor	Domestic gross
1.	Star Wars: The Force Awakens	Disney	$936,662,225
2.	Jurassic World	Universal	$652,270,625
3.	Avengers: Age of Ultron	Disney	$459,005,868
4.	Inside Out	Disney	$356,461,711
5.	Furious 7	Universal	$353,007,020
6.	Minions	Universal	$336,045,770
7.	The Hunger Games: Mockingjay – Part 2	Lionsgate	$281,723,902
8.	The Martian	Fox	$228,433,663
9.	Cinderella	Disney	$201,151,353
10.	Spectre	Sony	$200,074,609

Highest-grossing films by MPAA rating of 2015
G	The Peanuts Movie
PG	Inside Out
PG-13	Star Wars: The Force Awakens
R	The Revenant

== See also ==
- List of American films — American films by year
- Lists of box office number-one films

== Chronology ==
Preceded by 2014	2015	Succeeded by 2016
