= List of 2010 box office number-one films in the United States =

This is a list of films which have placed number one at the weekend box office in the United States during 2010.

== Number-one films ==
| † | This implies the highest-grossing movie of the year. |

| # | Weekend end date | Film | Gross | Notes | Ref |
|---|---|---|---|---|---|
| 1 | January 3, 2010 | Avatar † | $68,490,688 | Avatar broke Spider-Man's record ($45 million) for the highest third weekend gross of all time, and Cloverfield's record ($40.1 million) for the highest weekend gross in January. | |
| 2 | January 10, 2010 | Avatar † | $50,306,217 | Avatar broke Titanic's record ($28.7 million) for the highest fourth weekend gross of all time. It also became the first film since The Dark Knight to top the box office for four consecutive weekends. It also broke Pirates of the Caribbean: Dead Man's Chest's record (63 days) for the fastest film to gross $1 billion worldwide, crossing the mark in 19 days. | |
| 3 | January 17, 2010 | Avatar † | $42,785,612 | Avatar broke Titanic's record ($30 million) for the highest fifth weekend gross of all time, and Cloverfield's record ($40.1 million) for the highest Martin Luther King Jr. Day long-weekend gross ever. It also became the first film since The Sixth Sense to top the box office for five consecutive weekends and the first film since Signs to top the box office in its fifth weekend. | |
| 4 | January 24, 2010 | Avatar † | $34,944,081 | Avatar broke Titanic's record ($25.5 million) for the highest sixth weekend gross of all time. It also became the first film since Titanic to top the box office for six consecutive weekends. With this intake, it became the highest-grossing film of all time. | |
| 5 | January 31, 2010 | Avatar † | $31,280,029 | Avatar broke Titanic's record ($25.9 million) for the highest seventh weekend gross of all time. It also became the first film since Titanic to top the box office for seven consecutive weekends and the first film since The Passion of the Christ to top the box office in its seventh weekend. | |
| 6 | February 7, 2010 | Dear John | $30,468,614 | | |
| 7 | February 14, 2010 | Valentine's Day | $56,260,707 | Valentine's Day broke Ghost Rider's record ($45.4 million) for the highest President's Day weekend debut. | |
| 8 | February 21, 2010 | Shutter Island | $41,062,440 | | |
| 9 | February 28, 2010 | Shutter Island | $22,665,205 | | |
| 10 | March 7, 2010 | Alice in Wonderland | $116,101,023 | Alice in Wonderland broke 300's record ($70.9 million) for the highest weekend debut in March and Fast & Furious' record ($71 million) for the highest weekend debut for a spring release. It also broke Spider-Man's record ($114.8 million) for the highest weekend debut for a non-sequel, Harry Potter and the Goblet of Fire's record ($102.7 million) for the highest weekend debut for a live-action fantasy film, and Avatar's record ($77 million) for the highest weekend debut for a 3-D film. | |
| 11 | March 14, 2010 | Alice in Wonderland | $62,714,076 | | |
| 12 | March 21, 2010 | Alice in Wonderland | $34,189,969 | | |
| 13 | March 28, 2010 | How to Train Your Dragon | $43,732,319 | | |
| 14 | April 4, 2010 | Clash of the Titans | $61,235,105 | Clash of the Titans broke Scary Movie 4's record ($40.2 million) for the highest Easter weekend debut. | |
| 15 | April 11, 2010 | Clash of the Titans | $26,633,209 | Initial estimates had Date Night ahead of Clash of the Titans. | |
| 16 | April 18, 2010 | Kick-Ass | $19,828,687 | Initial estimates had How to Train Your Dragon ahead of Kick-Ass. | |
| 17 | April 25, 2010 | How to Train Your Dragon | $15,350,213 | How to Train Your Dragon reclaimed the #1 spot in its fifth weekend of release. It became the first film since Avatar to top the box office in its fifth weekend. | |
| 18 | May 2, 2010 | A Nightmare on Elm Street | $32,902,299 | | |
| 19 | May 9, 2010 | Iron Man 2 | $128,122,480 | Iron Man 2 had the highest weekend debut of 2010. | |
| 20 | May 16, 2010 | Iron Man 2 | $52,041,005 | | |
| 21 | May 23, 2010 | Shrek Forever After | $70,838,207 | | |
| 22 | May 30, 2010 | Shrek Forever After | $43,311,063 | | |
| 23 | June 6, 2010 | Shrek Forever After | $25,486,465 | | |
| 24 | June 13, 2010 | The Karate Kid | $55,665,805 | | |
| 25 | June 20, 2010 | Toy Story 3 | $110,307,189 | Toy Story 3 broke Transformers: Revenge of the Fallen's record ($109 million) for the highest weekend debut in June and Finding Nemo's record ($70.3 million) for the highest opening weekend for a G-rated film. Its $41.1 million opening day gross broke Shrek the Third's record ($38 million) for the biggest single day gross for an animated film. | |
| 26 | June 27, 2010 | Toy Story 3 | $59,337,669 | | |
| 27 | July 4, 2010 | The Twilight Saga: Eclipse | $64,832,191 | The Twilight Saga: Eclipse's $30.1 million gross from midnight showings broke The Twilight Saga: New Moon's record ($26.3 million) for the highest midnight opening ever. It also broke Transformers: Revenge of the Fallen's records for the highest midnight gross in IMAX ($959,000) with $1 million and the highest Wednesday gross of all-time with $68.5 million. | |
| 28 | July 11, 2010 | Despicable Me | $56,397,125 | | |
| 29 | July 18, 2010 | Inception | $62,785,337 | | |
| 30 | July 25, 2010 | Inception | $42,725,012 | | |
| 31 | August 1, 2010 | Inception | $27,485,245 | | |
| 32 | August 8, 2010 | The Other Guys | $35,543,162 | | |
| 33 | August 15, 2010 | The Expendables | $34,825,135 | | |
| 34 | August 22, 2010 | The Expendables | $16,968,032 | | |
| 35 | August 29, 2010 | Takers | $20,512,304 | Initial estimates had The Last Exorcism ahead of Takers. | |
| 36 | September 5, 2010 | The American | $13,177,790 | | |
| 37 | September 12, 2010 | Resident Evil: Afterlife | $26,650,264 | | |
| 38 | September 19, 2010 | The Town | $23,808,032 | | |
| 39 | September 26, 2010 | Wall Street: Money Never Sleeps | $19,011,188 | | |
| 40 | October 3, 2010 | The Social Network | $22,445,653 | | |
| 41 | October 10, 2010 | The Social Network | $15,451,991 | | |
| 42 | October 17, 2010 | Jackass 3D | $50,353,641 | Jackass 3D broke Scary Movie 3's records ($48.1 million) for the highest weekend debut in October and for any fall release. Jackass 3D also broke Brüno's record ($30.4 million) for the biggest weekend debut for a docu-comedy. | |
| 43 | October 24, 2010 | Paranormal Activity 2 | $40,678,424 | Paranormal Activity 2 broke Friday the 13th's record ($40.5 million) for the highest weekend debut for a horror film. | |
| 44 | October 31, 2010 | Saw 3D | $22,530,123 | | |
| 45 | November 7, 2010 | Megamind | $46,016,833 | | |
| 46 | November 14, 2010 | Megamind | $29,120,461 | | |
| 47 | November 21, 2010 | Harry Potter and the Deathly Hallows – Part 1 | $125,017,372 | Harry Potter and the Deathly Hallows – Part 1's $1.4 million midnight gross in IMAX broke The Twilight Saga: Eclipse's record ($1 million) for the highest midnight gross in IMAX. It also broke Alice in Wonderland's record ($116.1 million) for the highest weekend debut for a live-action fantasy film. | |
| 48 | November 28, 2010 | Harry Potter and the Deathly Hallows – Part 1 | $49,087,101 | In second place, Tangled's $48.8 million opening weekend broke The Lion King's records ($40.9 million) for the highest weekend debuts for a Walt Disney Animation Studios film and for a musical animated film. It also broke High School Musical 3: Senior Year's record ($42 million) for the highest weekend debut for a musical film. | |
| 49 | December 5, 2010 | Tangled | $21,608,891 | Tangled reached #1 in its second weekend of release. | |
| 50 | December 12, 2010 | The Chronicles of Narnia: The Voyage of the Dawn Treader | $24,005,069 | | |
| 51 | December 19, 2010 | Tron: Legacy | $44,026,211 | | |
| 52 | December 26, 2010 | Little Fockers | $30,833,665 | | |
| 53 | January 2, 2011 | Little Fockers | $25,766,485 | | |

== Highest-grossing films ==
=== Calendar Gross ===
Highest-grossing films of 2010 by Calendar Gross

| Rank | Title | Studio(s) | Actor(s) | Director(s) | Gross |
|---|---|---|---|---|---|
| 1. | Avatar | 20th Century Fox | Sam Worthington, Zoe Saldaña, Stephen Lang, Michelle Rodriguez and Sigourney Weaver | James Cameron | $466,141,929 |
| 2. | Toy Story 3 | Walt Disney Studios | voices of Tom Hanks, Tim Allen, Joan Cusack, Don Rickles, Wallace Shawn, John Ratzenberger, Estelle Harris, Blake Clark, Jeff Pidgeon, Ned Beatty, Michael Keaton, Jodi Benson and John Morris | Lee Unkrich | $410,171,027 |
| 3. | Alice in Wonderland | Walt Disney Studios | Johnny Depp, Anne Hathaway, Helena Bonham Carter, Crispin Glover, Matt Lucas, Mia Wasikowska, Alan Rickman, Stephen Fry, Michael Sheen and Timothy Spall | Tim Burton | $332,430,200 |
| 4. | Iron Man 2 | Paramount Pictures | Robert Downey Jr., Gwyneth Paltrow, Don Cheadle, Scarlett Johansson, Sam Rockwell, Mickey Rourke and Samuel L. Jackson | Jon Favreau | $312,433,331 |
| 5. | The Twilight Saga: Eclipse | Summit Entertainment | Kristen Stewart, Robert Pattinson, Taylor Lautner, Bryce Dallas Howard, Billy Burke and Dakota Fanning | David Slade | $300,531,751 |
| 6. | Inception | Warner Bros. Pictures | Leonardo DiCaprio, Ken Watanabe, Joseph Gordon-Levitt, Marion Cotillard, Elliot Page, Tom Hardy, Cillian Murphy, Tom Berenger and Michael Caine | Christopher Nolan | $292,558,188 |
| 7. | Harry Potter and the Deathly Hallows – Part 1 | Warner Bros. Pictures | Daniel Radcliffe, Rupert Grint, Emma Watson, Helena Bonham Carter, Robbie Coltrane, Warwick Davis, Ralph Fiennes, Michael Gambon, Brendan Gleeson, Richard Griffiths, John Hurt, Rhys Ifans, Jason Isaacs, Alan Rickman, Fiona Shaw, Timothy Spall, Imelda Staunton and David Thewlis | David Yates | $280,230,127 |
| 8. | Despicable Me | Universal Pictures | voices of Steve Carell, Jason Segel, Russell Brand, Kristen Wiig, Miranda Cosgrove, Will Arnett and Julie Andrews | Pierre Coffin and Chris Renaud | $251,083,040 |
| 9. | Shrek Forever After | Paramount Pictures | voices of Mike Myers, Eddie Murphy, Cameron Diaz, Antonio Banderas, Julie Andrews, John Cleese, Walt Dohrn, Jane Lynch, Jon Hamm, Craig Robinson, Lake Bell, Mary Kay Place, Kathy Griffin and Kristen Schaal | Mike Mitchell | $238,736,787 |
| 10. | How to Train Your Dragon | Paramount Pictures | voices of Jay Baruchel, Gerard Butler, Craig Ferguson, America Ferrera, Jonah Hill, Christopher Mintz-Plasse, T. J. Miller, Kristen Wiig and David Tennant | Chris Sanders and Dean DeBlois | $217,581,231 |

=== In-Year Release ===
Highest-grossing films of 2010 by In-year release
| Rank | Title | Distributor | Domestic gross |
|---|---|---|---|
| 1. | Toy Story 3 | Disney | $415,004,880 |
| 2. | Alice in Wonderland | Disney | $334,191,110 |
| 3. | Iron Man 2 | Paramount | $312,433,331 |
| 4. | The Twilight Saga: Eclipse | Summit | $300,531,751 |
| 5. | Harry Potter and the Deathly Hallows – Part 1 | Warner Bros. | $295,983,305 |
| 6. | Inception | Warner Bros. | $292,576,195 |
| 7. | Despicable Me | Universal | $251,513,985 |
| 8. | Shrek Forever After | Paramount | $238,736,787 |
| 9. | How to Train Your Dragon | Paramount | $217,581,231 |
| 10. | Tangled | Disney | $200,821,936 |

Highest-grossing films by MPAA rating of 2010
| G | Toy Story 3 |
| PG | Alice in Wonderland |
| PG-13 | Iron Man 2 |
| R | The King's Speech |

== See also ==
- List of American films — American films by year
- Lists of box office number-one films

== Chronology ==
| Preceded by 2009 | 2010 | Succeeded by 2011 |
