= List of 2009 box office number-one films in the United States =

This is a list of films which have placed number one at the weekend box office in the United States during 2009.

== Number-one films ==
†	This implies the highest-grossing movie of the year.

#	Weekend end date	Film	Box office	Notes	Ref
1	January 4, 2009	Marley & Me	$24,263,763		
2	January 11, 2009	Gran Torino	$29,484,388	Gran Torino reached #1 after four weekends of limited release.	
3	January 18, 2009	Paul Blart: Mall Cop	$31,832,636		
4	January 25, 2009	Paul Blart: Mall Cop	$21,623,182		
5	February 1, 2009	Taken	$24,717,037		
6	February 8, 2009	He's Just Not That Into You	$27,785,487		
7	February 15, 2009	Friday the 13th	$40,570,365	Friday the 13th broke Freddy vs. Jason's record ($36.4 million) for the highest debut for a slasher film.	
8	February 22, 2009	Madea Goes to Jail	$41,030,947	Madea Goes to Jail ($41 million) broke Saw III's record ($33 million) for the highest weekend debut for a film distributed by Lionsgate.	
9	March 1, 2009	Madea Goes to Jail	$16,175,926		
10	March 8, 2009	Watchmen	$55,214,334		
11	March 15, 2009	Race to Witch Mountain	$24,402,214		
12	March 22, 2009	Knowing	$24,604,751		
13	March 29, 2009	Monsters vs. Aliens	$59,321,095	Monsters vs. Aliens broke Spy Kids 3-D: Game Over's record ($33.4 million) for the highest weekend debut for a 3-D film.	
14	April 5, 2009	Fast & Furious	$70,950,500	Fast & Furious broke Anger Management's record ($42.2 million) for the highest weekend debut in April and 300's record ($70.8 million) for the highest weekend debut for a spring release.	
15	April 12, 2009	Hannah Montana: The Movie	$32,324,487		
16	April 19, 2009	17 Again	$23,722,310		
17	April 26, 2009	Obsessed	$28,612,730		
18	May 3, 2009	X-Men Origins: Wolverine	$85,058,003		
19	May 10, 2009	Star Trek	$75,204,289	Star Trek broke The Simpsons Movie's record ($74 million) for the highest weekend debut for a film based on a television show.	
20	May 17, 2009	Angels & Demons	$46,204,168		
21	May 24, 2009	Night at the Museum: Battle of the Smithsonian	$54,173,286		
22	May 31, 2009	Up	$68,108,790	Up broke Monsters vs. Aliens' record ($59.3 million) for the highest weekend debut for a 3-D film (which was set just two months earlier).	
23	June 7, 2009	The Hangover	$44,979,319	The Hangover broke Scary Movie's record ($42.3 million) for the highest weekend debut for an original R-rated comedy. Initial estimates had Up ahead of The Hangover.	
24	June 14, 2009	The Hangover	$32,794,387		
25	June 21, 2009	The Proposal	$33,627,598		
26	June 28, 2009	Transformers: Revenge of the Fallen †	$108,966,307	Transformers: Revenge of the Fallen's $959,000 midnight gross in IMAX broke The Dark Knight's record ($640,000) for the highest midnight gross in IMAX. Its $62 million opening day gross broke Harry Potter and the Order of the Phoenix's record ($44.2 million) for the highest Wednesday gross of all-time. It also broke Harry Potter and the Prisoner of Azkaban's record ($93.7 million) for the highest weekend debut in June and Star Trek's record ($75.2 million) for the highest weekend debut for a film based on a television show.	
27	July 5, 2009	Transformers: Revenge of the Fallen †	$42,320,877	Initial estimates had Transformers: Revenge of the Fallen tied with Ice Age: Dawn of the Dinosaurs. In second place, Ice Age: Dawn of the Dinosaurs' $41.6 million opening weekend broke The Devil Wears Prada's record ($27.5 million) for the highest non #1 Independence Day opening weekend.	
28	July 12, 2009	Brüno	$30,619,130	Brüno broke Borat's record ($26 million) for the highest weekend debut for a mockumentary.	
29	July 19, 2009	Harry Potter and the Half-Blood Prince	$77,835,727	Harry Potter and the Half-Blood Prince's $22.2 million gross from midnight showings broke The Dark Knight's record ($18.5 million) for the highest midnight opening ever.	
30	July 26, 2009	G-Force	$31,706,934		
31	August 2, 2009	Funny People	$22,657,780		
32	August 9, 2009	G.I. Joe: The Rise of Cobra	$54,713,046		
33	August 16, 2009	District 9	$37,354,308		
34	August 23, 2009	Inglourious Basterds	$38,054,676		
35	August 30, 2009	The Final Destination	$27,408,309		
36	September 6, 2009	The Final Destination	$12,368,882		
37	September 13, 2009	I Can Do Bad All by Myself	$23,446,785		
38	September 20, 2009	Cloudy with a Chance of Meatballs	$30,304,648		
39	September 27, 2009	Cloudy with a Chance of Meatballs	$25,038,803		
40	October 4, 2009	Zombieland	$24,733,155		
41	October 11, 2009	Couples Retreat	$34,286,740		
42	October 18, 2009	Where the Wild Things Are	$32,695,407		
43	October 25, 2009	Paranormal Activity	$21,104,070	Paranormal Activity reached #1 after four weekends of limited release.	
44	November 1, 2009	Michael Jackson's This Is It	$23,234,394		
45	November 8, 2009	A Christmas Carol	$30,051,075		
46	November 15, 2009	2012	$65,237,614		
47	November 22, 2009	The Twilight Saga: New Moon	$142,839,137	The Twilight Saga: New Moon's $26.3 million gross from midnight showings broke Harry Potter and the Half-Blood Prince's record ($22.2 million) for the highest midnight opening ever. Its opening day gross of $72.7 million broke The Dark Knight's record ($67.2 million) for the highest single-day tally of all time. It also broke Harry Potter and the Goblet of Fire's records ($102.7 million) for the highest weekend debut in November and for the holiday season as well as Twilight's records ($69.6 million) for the highest weekend debut for a vampire film and for a film featuring a female protagonist. It had the highest weekend debut of 2009.	
48	November 29, 2009	The Twilight Saga: New Moon	$42,870,031		
49	December 6, 2009	The Blind Side	$20,043,181	The Blind Side reached #1 in its third weekend of release.	
50	December 13, 2009	The Princess and the Frog	$24,208,916	The Princess and the Frog reached #1 after two weekends of limited release.	
51	December 20, 2009	Avatar	$77,025,481	Avatar broke The Day After Tomorrow's record ($68.7 million) for the highest opening weekend for an environmentalist film. It also broke Up's record ($68.1 million) for the highest weekend debut for a 3-D film and The Incredibles' record ($70.5 million) for the highest weekend debut for an original film.	
52	December 27, 2009	Avatar	$75,617,183	Avatar broke The Dark Knight's record ($75.2 million) for the highest second weekend gross of all time. In second place, Sherlock Holmes's opening day gross of $24.6 million broke Marley & Me's record ($14.3 million) for the highest Christmas Day opening of all time as well as Meet the Fockers' record ($19.5 million) for the highest Christmas Day gross of all time.	

== Highest-grossing films ==
=== Calendar Gross ===
Highest-grossing films of 2009 by Calendar Gross

Rank	Title	Studio(s)	Actor(s)	Director(s)	Gross
1.	Transformers: Revenge of the Fallen	Paramount Pictures	Shia LaBeouf, Megan Fox, Josh Duhamel, Tyrese Gibson, John Turturro, Peter Cullen and Hugo Weaving	Michael Bay	$402,111,870
2.	Harry Potter and the Half-Blood Prince	Warner Bros. Pictures	Daniel Radcliffe, Rupert Grint, Emma Watson, Jim Broadbent, Helena Bonham Carter, Robbie Coltrane, Warwick Davis, Michael Gambon, Alan Rickman, Maggie Smith, Timothy Spall, David Thewlis and Julie Walters	David Yates	$301,959,197
3.	Up	Walt Disney Pictures	voices of Ed Asner, Christopher Plummer, Jordan Nagai and Bob Peterson	Pete Docter	$287,002,967
4.	The Twilight Saga: New Moon	Summit Entertainment	Kristen Stewart, Robert Pattinson, Taylor Lautner, Ashley Greene, Rachelle Lefevre, Billy Burke, Peter Facinelli, Elizabeth Reaser, Nikki Reed, Kellan Lutz, Jackson Rathbone, Anna Kendrick, Michael Sheen and Dakota Fanning	Chris Weitz	$284,512,392
5.	Avatar	20th Century Fox	Sam Worthington, Zoe Saldaña, Stephen Lang, Michelle Rodriguez and Sigourney Weaver	James Cameron	$283,624,210
6.	The Hangover	Warner Bros. Pictures	Bradley Cooper, Ed Helms, Zach Galifianakis, Heather Graham, Justin Bartha and Jeffrey Tambor	Todd Phillips	$277,322,503
7.	Star Trek	Paramount Pictures	John Cho, Ben Cross, Bruce Greenwood, Simon Pegg, Chris Pine, Zachary Quinto, Winona Ryder, Zoe Saldaña, Karl Urban, Anton Yelchin, Eric Bana and Leonard Nimoy	J. J. Abrams	$253,730,019
8.	Monsters vs. Aliens	Paramount Pictures	voices of Reese Witherspoon, Seth Rogen, Hugh Laurie, Will Arnett, Kiefer Sutherland, Rainn Wilson, Paul Rudd and Stephen Colbert	Conrad Vernon and Rob Letterman	$198,351,526
9.	Ice Age: Dawn of the Dinosaurs	20th Century Fox	voices of voices of Ray Romano, John Leguizamo, Denis Leary, Queen Latifah, Seann William Scott, Josh Peck and Simon Pegg	Carlos Saldanha	$196,573,705
10.	The Blind Side	Warner Bros. Pictures	Sandra Bullock, Tim McGraw, Quinton Aaron and Kathy Bates	John Lee Hancock	$196,563,318

=== In-Year Release ===
Highest-grossing films of 2009 by In-year release
Rank	Title	Distributor	Domestic Gross
1.	Avatar	20th Century Fox	$749,766,139
2.	Transformers: Revenge of the Fallen	Paramount Pictures	$402,111,870
3.	Harry Potter and the Half-Blood Prince	Warner Bros.	$301,959,197
4.	The Twilight Saga: New Moon	Summit Entertainment	$296,623,634
5.	Up	Walt Disney Pictures	$293,004,164
6.	The Hangover	Warner Bros.	$277,322,503
7.	Star Trek	Paramount Pictures	$257,730,019
8.	The Blind Side	Warner Bros.	$255,959,475
9.	Alvin and the Chipmunks: The Squeakquel	20th Century Fox	$219,614,612
10.	Sherlock Holmes	Warner Bros.	$209,028,679

Highest-grossing films by MPAA rating of 2009
G	The Princess and the Frog
PG	Harry Potter and the Half-Blood Prince
PG-13	Avatar
R	The Hangover

== See also ==
- List of American films — American films by year
- Lists of box office number-one films

== Chronology ==
Preceded by 2008	2009	Succeeded by 2010
