= List of 2011 box office number-one films in the United States =

This is a list of films which have placed number one at the weekend box office in the United States during 2011.

== Number-one films ==
†	This implies the highest-grossing movie of the year.

#	Weekend end date	Film	Gross	Notes	Ref
1	January 9, 2011	True Grit	$14,605,135	True Grit reached #1 in its third weekend of release.	
2	January 16, 2011	The Green Hornet	$33,526,876		
3	January 23, 2011	No Strings Attached	$19,652,921		
4	January 30, 2011	The Rite	$14,789,393		
5	February 6, 2011	The Roommate	$15,002,635		
6	February 13, 2011	Just Go with It	$30,514,732		
7	February 20, 2011	Unknown	$21,856,389		
8	February 27, 2011	Hall Pass	$13,535,374	Initial estimates had Gnomeo and Juliet ahead of Hall Pass.	
9	March 6, 2011	Rango	$38,079,323		
10	March 13, 2011	Battle: Los Angeles	$35,573,187		
11	March 20, 2011	Limitless	$18,907,302		
12	March 27, 2011	Diary of a Wimpy Kid: Rodrick Rules	$23,751,502		
13	April 3, 2011	Hop	$37,543,710		
14	April 10, 2011	Hop	$21,298,240		
15	April 17, 2011	Rio	$39,225,962		
16	April 24, 2011	Rio	$26,323,321		
17	May 1, 2011	Fast Five	$86,198,765	Fast Five broke Fast & Furious' record ($71 million) for the highest weekend debut in April.	
18	May 8, 2011	Thor	$65,723,338		
19	May 15, 2011	Thor	$34,703,035		
20	May 22, 2011	Pirates of the Caribbean: On Stranger Tides	$90,151,958		
21	May 29, 2011	The Hangover Part II	$85,946,294	The Hangover Part II broke The Simpsons Movie's record ($74 million) for the highest weekend debut for a comedy. It also broke Austin Powers in Goldmember's record ($73 million) for the highest weekend debut for a live-action comedy.	
22	June 5, 2011	X-Men: First Class	$55,101,604		
23	June 12, 2011	Super 8	$35,451,168		
24	June 19, 2011	Green Lantern	$53,174,303		
25	June 26, 2011	Cars 2	$66,135,507		
26	July 3, 2011	Transformers: Dark of the Moon	$97,852,865	Transformers: Dark of the Moon broke Spider-Man 2's record ($88.2 million) for the highest Fourth of July weekend debut.	
27	July 10, 2011	Transformers: Dark of the Moon	$47,103,276		
28	July 17, 2011	Harry Potter and the Deathly Hallows – Part 2 †	$169,189,427	Harry Potter and the Deathly Hallows – Part 2's $43.5 million gross from midnight showings broke The Twilight Saga: Eclipse's record ($30.1 million) for the highest midnight opening of all time. Its $2 million midnight gross in IMAX broke the previous film, Harry Potter and the Deathly Hallows – Part 1's record ($1.4 million) for the highest midnight gross in IMAX. Its opening day gross of $91.1 million broke The Twilight Saga: New Moon's record ($72.7 million) for the highest single-day tally of all time. It also broke The Dark Knight's records ($158.4 million) for the highest weekend debut in July, for a summer release, a PG-13 rated film, a Warner Bros. film, and of all time, Alice in Wonderland's record ($116.1 million) for the highest weekend debut for a 3-D film, and Harry Potter and the Deathly Hallows – Part 1's record ($125 million) for the highest weekend debut for a live-action fantasy film. It had the highest weekend debut of 2011.	
29	July 24, 2011	Captain America: The First Avenger	$65,058,524		
30	July 31, 2011	Cowboys & Aliens	$36,431,290	Initial estimates had Cowboys and Aliens tied with The Smurfs.	
31	August 7, 2011	Rise of the Planet of the Apes	$54,806,191		
32	August 14, 2011	Rise of the Planet of the Apes	$27,832,307		
33	August 21, 2011	The Help	$20,018,659	The Help reached #1 in its second weekend of release.	
34	August 28, 2011	The Help	$14,536,118		
35	September 4, 2011	The Help	$14,594,623	The Help became the first film since Avatar to top the box office in its fourth weekend.	
36	September 11, 2011	Contagion	$22,403,596		
37	September 18, 2011	The Lion King (in 3D)	$30,151,614	The Lion King became the first re-release to reach #1 at the box office since Return of the Jedi (Special Edition) in March 1997.	
38	September 25, 2011	The Lion King (in 3D)	$21,929,332	The Lion King became the first re-release to reach #1 for two weeks at the box office since The Empire Strikes Back (Special Edition) in March 1997.	
39	October 2, 2011	Dolphin Tale	$13,912,419	Dolphin Tale reached #1 in its second weekend of release.	
40	October 9, 2011	Real Steel	$27,319,677	Real Steel broke Rocky IV's record ($20 million) for the highest weekend debut for a boxing film.	
41	October 16, 2011	Real Steel	$16,291,655		
42	October 23, 2011	Paranormal Activity 3	$52,568,183	Paranormal Activity 3 broke Paranormal Activity 2's record ($40.6 million) for the highest weekend debut for a horror film. It also broke Jackass 3D's record ($50.3 million) for the highest weekend debut in October and for any fall release.	
43	October 30, 2011	Puss in Boots	$34,077,439	Puss in Boots broke Saw III's record ($33.6 million) for the highest Halloween weekend debut.	
44	November 6, 2011	Puss in Boots	$33,054,644		
45	November 13, 2011	Immortals	$32,206,425		
46	November 20, 2011	The Twilight Saga: Breaking Dawn – Part 1	$138,122,261		
47	November 27, 2011	The Twilight Saga: Breaking Dawn – Part 1	$41,683,574		
48	December 4, 2011	The Twilight Saga: Breaking Dawn – Part 1	$16,535,465		
49	December 11, 2011	New Year's Eve	$13,019,180		
50	December 18, 2011	Sherlock Holmes: A Game of Shadows	$39,637,079		
51	December 25, 2011	Mission: Impossible – Ghost Protocol	$29,556,629	Mission: Impossible – Ghost Protocol reached #1 after one weekend of limited release in IMAX.	
52	January 1, 2012	Mission: Impossible – Ghost Protocol	$29,421,879		

== Highest-grossing films ==
=== Calendar Gross ===
Highest-grossing films of 2011 by Calendar Gross

Rank	Title	Studio(s)	Actor(s)	Director(s)	Gross
1.	Harry Potter and the Deathly Hallows – Part 2	Warner Bros. Pictures	Daniel Radcliffe, Rupert Grint, Emma Watson, Helena Bonham Carter, Robbie Coltrane, Warwick Davis, Ralph Fiennes, Michael Gambon, John Hurt, Jason Isaacs, Gary Oldman, Alan Rickman, Maggie Smith, David Thewlis and Julie Walters	David Yates	$381,011,219
2.	Transformers: Dark of the Moon	Paramount Pictures	Shia LaBeouf, Josh Duhamel, John Turturro, Tyrese Gibson, Rosie Huntington-Whiteley, Patrick Dempsey, Kevin Dunn, Julie White, John Malkovich and Frances McDormand	Michael Bay	$346,890,543
3.	The Twilight Saga: Breaking Dawn – Part 1	Summit Entertainment	Kristen Stewart, Robert Pattinson, Taylor Lautner, Billy Burke, Peter Facinelli, Elizabeth Reaser, Kellan Lutz, Nikki Reed, Jackson Rathbone, Ashley Greene and Anna Kendrick	Bill Condon	$274,841,954
4.	The Hangover Part II	Warner Bros. Pictures	Bradley Cooper, Ed Helms, Zach Galifianakis, Ken Jeong, Jeffrey Tambor, Justin Bartha and Paul Giamatti	Todd Phillips	$254,464,305
5.	Pirates of the Caribbean: On Stranger Tides	Walt Disney Studios	Johnny Depp, Penélope Cruz, Ian McShane, Kevin McNally and Geoffrey Rush	Rob Marshall	$237,710,309
6.	Fast Five	Universal Pictures	Vin Diesel, Paul Walker, Jordana Brewster, Tyrese Gibson, Chris "Ludacris" Bridges, Matt Schulze, Sung Kang, Tego Calderon, Don Omar, Gal Gadot and Dwayne Johnson	Justin Lin	$209,837,675
7.	Cars 2	Walt Disney Studios	voices of Owen Wilson, Larry the Cable Guy, Michael Caine, Emily Mortimer, John Turturro and Eddie Izzard	John Lasseter	$190,518,314
8.	Thor	Paramount Pictures	Chris Hemsworth, Natalie Portman, Tom Hiddleston, Stellan Skarsgård, Kat Dennings, Clark Gregg, Colm Feore, Ray Stevenson, Idris Elba, Jaimie Alexander, Rene Russo and Anthony Hopkins	Kenneth Branagh	$181,030,624
9.	Rise of the Planet of the Apes	20th Century Fox	James Franco, Freida Pinto, John Lithgow, Brian Cox, Tom Felton, David Oyelowo and Andy Serkis	Rupert Wyatt	$176,760,185
10.	Captain America: The First Avenger	Paramount Pictures	Chris Evans, Tommy Lee Jones, Hugo Weaving, Hayley Atwell, Sebastian Stan, Dominic Cooper, Toby Jones, Neal McDonough, Derek Luke and Stanley Tucci	Joe Johnston	$176,654,505

=== In-Year Release ===
Highest-grossing films of 2011 by In-year release
Rank	Title	Distributor	Domestic gross
1.	Harry Potter and the Deathly Hallows – Part 2	Warner Bros.	$381,011,219
2.	Transformers: Dark of the Moon	Paramount Pictures	$352,390,543
3.	The Twilight Saga: Breaking Dawn – Part 1	Summit Entertainment	$281,287,133
4.	The Hangover Part II	Warner Bros.	$254,464,305
5.	Pirates of the Caribbean: On Stranger Tides	Walt Disney Pictures	$241,071,802
6.	Fast Five	Universal Pictures	$209,837,675
7.	Mission: Impossible – Ghost Protocol	Paramount Pictures	$209,397,903
8.	Cars 2	Walt Disney Pictures	$191,452,396
9.	Sherlock Holmes: A Game of Shadows	Warner Bros.	$186,848,418
10.	Thor	Paramount Pictures	$181,030,624

Highest-grossing films by MPAA rating of 2011
G	Cars 2
PG	Kung Fu Panda 2
PG-13	Harry Potter and the Deathly Hallows – Part 2
R	The Hangover Part II

== See also ==
- List of American films — American films by year
- Lists of box office number-one films

== Chronology ==
Preceded by 2010	2011	Succeeded by 2012
