= List of 2013 box office number-one films in the United States =

This is a list of films which placed number one at the weekend box office for the year 2013.

== Number-one films ==
†	This implies the highest-grossing movie of the year.

#	Weekend end date	Film	Gross	Notes	Ref
1	January 6, 2013	Texas Chainsaw 3D	$21,744,470		
2	January 13, 2013	Zero Dark Thirty	$24,438,936	Zero Dark Thirty reached #1 after three weekends of limited release.	
3	January 20, 2013	Mama	$28,402,311		
4	January 27, 2013	Hansel & Gretel: Witch Hunters	$19,690,956		
5	February 3, 2013	Warm Bodies	$20,353,967		
6	February 10, 2013	Identity Thief	$34,551,025		
7	February 17, 2013	A Good Day to Die Hard	$24,834,845		
8	February 24, 2013	Identity Thief	$14,017,085	Identity Thief reclaimed the #1 spot in its third weekend of release.	
9	March 3, 2013	Jack the Giant Slayer	$27,202,226		
10	March 10, 2013	Oz the Great and Powerful	$79,110,453		
11	March 17, 2013	Oz the Great and Powerful	$41,252,704		
12	March 24, 2013	The Croods	$43,639,736		
13	March 31, 2013	G.I. Joe: Retaliation	$40,501,814		
14	April 7, 2013	Evil Dead	$25,775,847		
15	April 14, 2013	42	$27,487,144	42 broke The Benchwarmers' record ($19.7 million) for the highest weekend debut for a baseball film.	
16	April 21, 2013	Oblivion	$37,054,485		
17	April 28, 2013	Pain & Gain	$20,244,505		
18	May 5, 2013	Iron Man 3 †	$174,144,585	Iron Man 3 had the highest weekend debut of 2013.	
19	May 12, 2013	Iron Man 3 †	$72,525,615		
20	May 19, 2013	Star Trek Into Darkness	$70,165,559		
21	May 26, 2013	Fast & Furious 6	$97,375,245		
22	June 2, 2013	Fast & Furious 6	$35,164,440		
23	June 9, 2013	The Purge	$34,058,360	The Purge broke The Devil Inside's record ($33.7 million) for the highest weekend debut for an original R-rated horror film.	
24	June 16, 2013	Man of Steel	$116,619,362	Man of Steel broke Toy Story 3's record ($110.3 million) for the highest weekend debut in June.	
25	June 23, 2013	Monsters University	$82,429,469	In second place, World War Z's opening ($66.4 million) broke Dawn of the Dead's ($26.7 million) record for the highest weekend debut for a zombie film.	
26	June 30, 2013	Monsters University	$45,607,745		
27	July 7, 2013	Despicable Me 2	$83,517,315		
28	July 14, 2013	Despicable Me 2	$43,892,895		
29	July 21, 2013	The Conjuring	$41,855,326	The Conjuring broke The Purge's record ($34.1 million) for the highest weekend debut for an original R-rated horror film (which had been set one month earlier).	
30	July 28, 2013	The Wolverine	$53,113,752		
31	August 4, 2013	2 Guns	$27,059,130		
32	August 11, 2013	Elysium	$29,807,393		
33	August 18, 2013	The Butler	$24,637,312		
34	August 25, 2013	The Butler	$16,503,812		
35	September 1, 2013	One Direction: This Is Us (3-day)	$15,815,497	Without the inclusion of the Labor Day holiday, One Direction: This Is Us was #1 for the three-day frame. The Butler was #2 ($14,878,286) for the three-day frame.	
35	September 1, 2013	The Butler (4-day)	$20,201,272	With the inclusion of the Labor Day holiday, The Butler was #1 (for the third consecutive week) during the four-day time-frame. Also, The Butler became the first 2013 film to win three consecutive weekends. One Direction: This Is Us was #2 ($18,472,875) for the four-day frame.	
36	September 8, 2013	Riddick	$19,030,375		
37	September 15, 2013	Insidious: Chapter 2	$40,272,103		
38	September 22, 2013	Prisoners	$20,817,053		
39	September 29, 2013	Cloudy with a Chance of Meatballs 2	$34,017,930		
40	October 6, 2013	Gravity	$55,785,112	Gravity broke Paranormal Activity 3's records ($52 million) for the highest weekend debut in October and for a fall release.	
41	October 13, 2013	Gravity	$43,188,256		
42	October 20, 2013	Gravity	$30,027,161	Gravity became the first film of 2013 to top the box office for three consecutive weekends.	
43	October 27, 2013	Bad Grandpa	$32,055,177		
44	November 3, 2013	Ender's Game	$27,017,351		
45	November 10, 2013	Thor: The Dark World	$85,737,841		
46	November 17, 2013	Thor: The Dark World	$36,586,016		
47	November 24, 2013	The Hunger Games: Catching Fire	$158,074,286	The Hunger Games: Catching Fire broke The Twilight Saga: New Moon's records ($142.9 million) for the highest weekend debut in November and for the holiday season. It also broke The Hunger Games' record ($152.2 million) for highest weekend debut for a film featuring a female protagonist.	
48	December 1, 2013	The Hunger Games: Catching Fire	$74,179,601	The Hunger Games: Catching Fire broke Harry Potter and the Sorcerer's Stone's record ($57.4 million) for the highest Thanksgiving weekend ever. In second place, Frozen's $67.4 million opening weekend broke Toy Story 2's record ($57.3 million) for the highest Thanksgiving weekend debut and Wreck-It Ralph's record ($49 million) for the highest weekend debut for a Walt Disney Animation Studios film.	
49	December 8, 2013	Frozen	$31,616,230	Frozen reached the #1 spot in its second weekend of wide release and third overall week of release.	
50	December 15, 2013	The Hobbit: The Desolation of Smaug	$73,645,197		
51	December 22, 2013	The Hobbit: The Desolation of Smaug	$31,505,278		
52	December 29, 2013	The Hobbit: The Desolation of Smaug	$29,031,732		

== Highest-grossing films ==
=== Calendar Gross ===
Highest-grossing films of 2013 by Calendar Gross

Rank	Title	Studio(s)	Actor(s)	Director(s)	Gross
1.	Iron Man 3	Walt Disney Studios	Robert Downey Jr., Gwyneth Paltrow, Don Cheadle, Guy Pearce, Rebecca Hall, Stéphanie Szostak, James Badge Dale, William Sadler, Miguel Ferrer, Jon Favreau and Ben Kingsley	Shane Black	$406,609,688
2.	The Hunger Games: Catching Fire	Lionsgate	Jennifer Lawrence, Josh Hutcherson, Liam Hemsworth, Woody Harrelson, Elizabeth Banks, Lenny Kravitz, Philip Seymour Hoffman, Jeffrey Wright, Stanley Tucci and Donald Sutherland	Francis Lawrence	$395,526,705
3.	Despicable Me 2	Universal Pictures	voices of Steve Carell, Kristen Wiig, Benjamin Bratt, Miranda Cosgrove, Russell Brand and Ken Jeong	Chris Renaud and Pierre Coffin	$367,793,270
4.	Man of Steel	Warner Bros. Pictures	Henry Cavill, Amy Adams, Michael Shannon, Kevin Costner, Diane Lane, Laurence Fishburne, Antje Traue, Ayelet Zurer, Christopher Meloni and Russell Crowe	Zack Snyder	$291,045,518
5.	Monsters University	Walt Disney Studios	voices of Billy Crystal, John Goodman, Steve Buscemi, Helen Mirren, Peter Sohn, Joel Murray, Sean Hayes, Dave Foley, Charlie Day, Aubrey Plaza, and Nathan Fillion	Dan Scanlon	$263,763,344
6.	Frozen	Walt Disney Studios	voices of Kristen Bell, Idina Menzel, Jonathan Groff, Josh Gad and Santino Fontana	Chris Buck and Jennifer Lee	$263,092,648
7.	Gravity	Warner Bros. Pictures	Sandra Bullock and George Clooney	Alfonso Cuarón	$254,861,229
8.	Fast & Furious 6	Universal Pictures	Vin Diesel, Paul Walker, Dwayne Johnson, Michelle Rodriguez, Jordana Brewster, Tyrese Gibson, Ludacris, Sung Kang, Luke Evans, Gina Carano and John Ortiz	Justin Lin	$238,679,850
9.	Oz the Great and Powerful	Walt Disney Studios	James Franco, Mila Kunis, Rachel Weisz, Michelle Williams, Zach Braff, Bill Cobbs, Joey King and Tony Cox	Sam Raimi	$232,613,195
10.	Star Trek Into Darkness	Paramount Pictures	John Cho, Benedict Cumberbatch, Alice Eve, Bruce Greenwood, Simon Pegg, Chris Pine, Zachary Quinto, Zoe Saldaña, Karl Urban, Peter Weller and Anton Yelchin	J. J. Abrams	$226,778,661

=== In-Year Release ===
Highest-grossing films of 2013 by In-year release
Rank	Title	Distributor	Domestic gross
1.	The Hunger Games: Catching Fire	Lionsgate	$424,668,047
2.	Iron Man 3	Disney	$409,013,994
3.	Frozen	Disney	$400,738,009
4.	Despicable Me 2	Universal	$368,065,385
5.	Man of Steel	Warner Bros.	$291,045,518
6.	Gravity	Warner Bros.	$274,092,705
7.	Monsters University	Disney	$268,492,764
8.	The Hobbit: The Desolation of Smaug	Warner Bros.	$258,366,855
9.	Fast & Furious 6	Universal	$238,679,850
10.	Oz the Great and Powerful	Disney	$234,911,825

Highest-grossing films by MPAA rating of 2013
G	Monsters University
PG	Frozen
PG-13	The Hunger Games: Catching Fire
R	The Heat

== See also ==
- List of American films — American films by year
- Lists of box office number-one films

== Chronology ==
Preceded by 2012	2013	Succeeded by 2014
