= List of 2008 box office number-one films in the United States =

This is a list of films which have placed number one at the weekend box office in the United States during 2008.

== Number-one films ==
†	This implies the highest-grossing movie of the year.

#	Weekend end date	Film	Gross	Notes	Ref
1	January 6, 2008	National Treasure: Book of Secrets	$20,062,684		
2	January 13, 2008	The Bucket List	$19,392,416	The Bucket List reached #1 after two weekends of limited release.	
3	January 20, 2008	Cloverfield	$40,058,229	Cloverfield broke Star Wars (Special Edition)'s record ($35.9 million) for the highest weekend debut in January, Black Hawk Down's record ($28.6 million) for the highest Martin Luther King Jr. Day long-weekend debut, and Titanic's record ($30.0 million) for the highest Martin Luther King Jr. Day long-weekend gross ever.	
4	January 27, 2008	Meet the Spartans	$18,505,530		
5	February 3, 2008	Hannah Montana & Miley Cyrus: Best of Both Worlds Concert	$31,117,834	Hannah Montana and Miley Cyrus: Best of Both Worlds Concert broke When a Stranger Calls' record ($21.6 million) for the highest Super Bowl weekend debut, and Borat's record ($26.4 million) for highest opening weekend for a film opening in less than 1,000 theaters.	
6	February 10, 2008	Fool's Gold	$21,589,295		
7	February 17, 2008	Jumper	$27,354,808		
8	February 24, 2008	Vantage Point	$22,874,936		
9	March 2, 2008	Semi-Pro	$15,075,114		
10	March 9, 2008	10,000 BC	$35,867,488		
11	March 16, 2008	Horton Hears a Who!	$45,012,998		
12	March 23, 2008	Horton Hears a Who!	$24,590,596		
13	March 30, 2008	21	$24,105,943		
14	April 6, 2008	21	$15,337,418		
15	April 13, 2008	Prom Night	$20,804,941		
16	April 20, 2008	The Forbidden Kingdom	$21,401,121		
17	April 27, 2008	Baby Mama	$17,407,110		
18	May 4, 2008	Iron Man	$98,618,668		
19	May 11, 2008	Iron Man	$51,190,629		
20	May 18, 2008	The Chronicles of Narnia: Prince Caspian	$55,034,805		
21	May 26, 2008	Indiana Jones and the Kingdom of the Crystal Skull	$100,137,835		
22	June 1, 2008	Sex and the City	$57,038,404	Sex and the City broke Hitch's record ($43.1 million) for the highest weekend debut for a romantic comedy and The Village's record ($50.7 million) for highest weekend debut for a film featuring a female protagonist.	
23	June 8, 2008	Kung Fu Panda	$60,239,130		
24	June 15, 2008	The Incredible Hulk	$55,414,050		
25	June 22, 2008	Get Smart	$38,683,480		
26	June 29, 2008	WALL-E	$63,087,526		
27	July 6, 2008	Hancock	$62,603,879		
28	July 13, 2008	Hellboy II: The Golden Army	$34,539,115		
29	July 20, 2008	The Dark Knight †	$158,411,483	The Dark Knight's $18.5 million gross from midnight showings broke Star Wars: Episode III – Revenge of the Sith's record ($16.9 million) for the highest midnight opening ever. Its $67.1 million gross on opening day broke Spider-Man 3's record ($59.8 million) for the highest single-day tally of all time. It also broke Pirates of the Caribbean: Dead Man's Chest's record ($135.6 million) for the highest weekend debut in July, Harry Potter and the Goblet of Fire's record ($102.6 million) for the highest opening for a Warner Bros. film, and Spider-Man 3's records ($151.1 million) for the highest weekend debut for a summer release, for a PG-13 rated film, a superhero film, and of all-time. The Dark Knight had the highest weekend debut of 2008. In second place, Mamma Mia!'s $27.8 million opening weekend broke Hairspray's record ($27.5 million) for the highest weekend debut for a Broadway adaptation.	
30	July 27, 2008	The Dark Knight †	$75,166,466	The Dark Knight broke Shrek 2's record ($72.1 million) for the highest second weekend gross of all time.	
31	August 3, 2008	The Dark Knight †	$42,664,219		
32	August 10, 2008	The Dark Knight †	$26,117,030	The Dark Knight became the first film since The Lord of the Rings: The Return of the King to hold the top spot at the box office for four consecutive weekends. It also became the first film since The Chronicles of Narnia: The Lion, the Witch and the Wardrobe to top the box office in its fourth weekend as well as the first film since The Passion of the Christ to top the box office for four weekends.	
33	August 17, 2008	Tropic Thunder	$25,812,796		
34	August 24, 2008	Tropic Thunder	$16,272,195		
35	August 31, 2008	Tropic Thunder	$11,518,611	Tropic Thunder and The Dark Knight became the first two films to win at least three consecutive weekends in a row since The Lord of the Rings: The Fellowship of the Ring and Black Hawk Down.	
36	September 7, 2008	Bangkok Dangerous	$7,783,266		
37	September 14, 2008	Burn After Reading	$19,128,001		
38	September 21, 2008	Lakeview Terrace	$15,004,672		
39	September 28, 2008	Eagle Eye	$29,150,721		
40	October 5, 2008	Beverly Hills Chihuahua	$29,300,465		
41	October 12, 2008	Beverly Hills Chihuahua	$17,502,077		
42	October 19, 2008	Max Payne	$17,639,849		
43	October 26, 2008	High School Musical 3: Senior Year	$42,030,184	High School Musical 3: Senior Year broke The Lion King's record ($40.9 million) for the highest weekend debut for a musical film and Enchanted's record ($34.4 million) for highest weekend debut for a live-action musical film.	
44	November 2, 2008	High School Musical 3: Senior Year	$15,316,072		
45	November 9, 2008	Madagascar: Escape 2 Africa	$63,106,589		
46	November 16, 2008	Quantum of Solace	$67,528,882		
47	November 23, 2008	Twilight	$69,637,740	Twilight broke Van Helsing's record ($51.7 million) for the highest weekend debut for a vampire film and Sex and the City's record ($57.0 million) for highest weekend debut for a film featuring a female protagonist. It also broke Deep Impact's record ($41.1 million) for the highest weekend debut for a female-directed film.	
48	November 30, 2008	Four Christmases	$31,069,826		
49	December 7, 2008	Four Christmases	$16,755,478		
50	December 14, 2008	The Day the Earth Stood Still	$30,480,153		
51	December 21, 2008	Yes Man	$18,262,471		
52	December 28, 2008	Marley & Me	$36,357,586	Marley & Me's opening day gross of $14.3 million broke Ali's record ($10.2 million) for the highest Christmas Day opening of all time.	

== Highest-grossing films ==
=== Calendar Gross ===
Highest-grossing films of 2008 by Calendar Gross

Rank	Title	Studio(s)	Actor(s)	Director(s)	Gross
1.	The Dark Knight	Warner Bros. Pictures	Christian Bale, Michael Caine, Heath Ledger, Gary Oldman, Aaron Eckhart, Maggie Gyllenhaal and Morgan Freeman	Christopher Nolan	$530,924,926
2.	Iron Man	Paramount Pictures	Robert Downey Jr., Terrence Howard, Jeff Bridges, Shaun Toub and Gwyneth Paltrow	Jon Favreau	$318,313,199
3.	Indiana Jones and the Kingdom of the Crystal Skull	Paramount Pictures	Harrison Ford, Cate Blanchett, Karen Allen, Ray Winstone, John Hurt, Jim Broadbent and Shia LaBeouf	Steven Spielberg	$317,101,119
4.	Hancock	Columbia Pictures	Will Smith, Charlize Theron, Jason Bateman and Eddie Marsan	Peter Berg	$227,860,802
5.	WALL-E	Walt Disney Studios	voices of Ben Burtt, Elissa Knight, Jeff Garlin, Fred Willard, John Ratzenberger, Kathy Najimy and Sigourney Weaver	Andrew Stanton	$223,797,414
6.	Kung Fu Panda	Paramount Pictures	voices of Jack Black, Dustin Hoffman, Angelina Jolie, Ian McShane, Seth Rogen, Lucy Liu, David Cross, Randall Duk Kim, James Hong, Dan Fogler, Michael Clarke Duncan and Jackie Chan	John Stevenson and Mark Osborne	$215,434,591
7.	Madagascar: Escape 2 Africa	Paramount Pictures	voices of Ben Stiller, Chris Rock, David Schwimmer, Jada Pinkett Smith, Sacha Baron Cohen, Cedric the Entertainer, Andy Richter, Bernie Mac, Alec Baldwin, Sherri Shepherd, will.i.am, Elisa Gabrielli, Tom McGrath, John DiMaggio, Chris Miller, Christopher Knights and Conrad Vernon	Eric Darnell and Tom McGrath	$175,687,934
8.	Twilight	Summit Entertainment	Kristen Stewart, Robert Pattinson, Billy Burke, Peter Facinelli and Taylor Lautner	Catherine Hardwicke	$170,672,975
9.	Quantum of Solace	Columbia Pictures	Daniel Craig, Olga Kurylenko, Mathieu Amalric, Gemma Arterton, Giancarlo Giannini, Jeffrey Wright and Judi Dench	Marc Forster	$165,258,802
10.	Horton Hears a Who!	20th Century Fox	voices of Jim Carrey, Steve Carell, Carol Burnett, Will Arnett, Seth Rogen, Dan Fogler, Isla Fisher, Jonah Hill, Amy Poehler and Charles Osgood	Jimmy Hayward and Steve Martino	$154,529,439

=== In-Year Release ===
Highest-grossing films of 2008 by In-year release
Rank	Title	Distributor	Domestic Gross
1.	The Dark Knight	Warner Bros.	$533,345,358
2.	Iron Man	Paramount Pictures	$319,412,101
3.	Indiana Jones and the Kingdom of the Crystal Skull	Paramount Pictures	$317,101,119
4.	Hancock	Columbia Pictures	$227,946,274
5.	WALL-E	Walt Disney Pictures	$223,808,164
6.	Kung Fu Panda	Paramount Pictures	$215,434,591
7.	Twilight	Summit Entertainment	$192,769,854
8.	Madagascar: Escape 2 Africa	Paramount Pictures	$180,010,950
9.	Quantum of Solace	Columbia Pictures	$168,368,427
10.	Horton Hears a Who!	20th Century Fox	$154,529,439

Highest-grossing films by MPAA rating of 2008
G	WALL-E
PG	Kung Fu Panda
PG-13	The Dark Knight
R	Sex and the City

== See also ==
- List of American films — American films by year
- Lists of box office number-one films

== Chronology ==
Preceded by 2007	2008	Succeeded by 2009
