= Congo (film) =

- Theatrical release poster
- Directed by: Frank Marshall
- Screenplay by: John Patrick Shanley
- Based on: Congo by Michael Crichton
- Produced by: Kathleen Kennedy; Sam Mercer
- Starring: Laura Linney; Dylan Walsh; Ernie Hudson; Grant Heslov; Joe Don Baker; Tim Curry
- Cinematography: Allen Daviau
- Edited by: Anne V. Coates
- Music by: Jerry Goldsmith
- Production company: The Kennedy/Marshall Company
- Distributed by: Paramount Pictures
- Release date: June 9, 1995
- Running time: 108 minutes
- Country: United States
- Language: English
- Budget: $50 million
- Box office: $152 million

Congo is a 1995 American science fiction action-adventure film directed by Frank Marshall from a screenplay by John Patrick Shanley, based on the 1980 novel by Michael Crichton. It stars Laura Linney, Dylan Walsh, Ernie Hudson, Grant Heslov, Joe Don Baker and Tim Curry. The film tells the story of an expedition team and a mountain gorilla owned by one of its members who go to the Congolian rainforests to find a missing expedition and the ruins of an ancient civilization where diamonds might be located while encountering the undiscovered and violent gorilla species that lurks near there.

Released on June 9, 1995, by Paramount Pictures, Congo received negative reviews but performed better than expected at the box office. It was nominated for seven Golden Raspberry Awards including for Worst Picture. Conversely, the film was also nominated for three Saturn Awards, including Best Science Fiction Film.

== Plot ==
Searching for rare blue diamonds that could enable a revolutionary communications laser, TraviCom employees Charles Travis and Jeffrey Weems discover the ruins of a lost city near a remote volcano in the Congolian rainforests. Karen Ross, Charles's ex-fiancée and a former CIA operative, and R.B. Travis, Charles's father and the CEO of TraviCom, lose contact with the team while tracking their progress at the company headquarters. A remote camera shows the camp destroyed and strewn with corpses, before what appears to be a monstrous gray gorilla destroys the camera. Travis asks Karen to lead another expedition to the site.

Primatologist Peter Elliott and his assistant Richard teach human communication to a mountain gorilla named Amy, whose sign language is translated into a digitized voice. Peter is concerned by Amy's nightmares, drawings of jungles, and the Eye of Providence and wants to return her to Africa. Karen and Romanian philanthropist Herkermer Homolka join the expedition.

The group flies to Uganda and meets wilderness guide Monroe Kelly. Captain Wanta warns them not to trust Homolka and lets them proceed only upon receipt of a large bribe. On their journey via Tanzania and then Zaire, Monroe reveals that Homolka has led previous, disastrous safaris in search of the "Lost City of Zinj", which was built over a diamond mine owned by King Solomon. Their plane is shot down as they parachute into the jungle.

A native tribe leads them to Bob Driscoll, a wounded member of Charles's expedition who dies screaming upon sight of Amy. The group continues by boat, and they learn that Homolka believes Amy can lead them to the mine. They find the ruined camp near the City of Zinj. Richard and some porters are killed by a gray gorilla. The group keeps the gray gorillas at bay with automated sentry guns.

At daybreak, they explore the city and surmise from hieroglyphs that the inhabitants bred the gray gorillas to guard the mine but were overthrown by them. At the mine, Homolka begins collecting diamonds, only to be killed by the gray gorillas. Monroe, Karen, and Peter flee deeper into the mine, where they discover Jeffrey and Charles's bodies, with the latter still holding a giant blue diamond. Karen fits the diamond into a portable laser and uses it to kill several gray gorillas. The volcano erupts, and the four escape as lava floods the city, killing the gray gorillas.

Karen reports to Travis, but when she learns that Travis was only interested in the diamond and not Charlie, she destroys the TraviCom satellite. They find a hot-air balloon in one of Travis's wrecked cargo planes. Seeing Amy with fellow mountain gorillas, Peter bids her goodbye. The three take off in the balloon, and Karen has Peter throw the diamond into the jungle below. Amy watches the departing balloon, then joins the other mountain gorillas.

== Cast ==
- Laura Linney as Karen Ross, an electronics expert employed by TraviCom and former CIA operative who travels to Zaire in search of her ex-fiancé
- Dylan Walsh as Peter Elliott, a primatologist taking his pet gorilla back to Zaire
- Ernie Hudson as Captain Monroe Kelly, a mercenary guide employed by Karen
- Tim Curry as Herkermer Homolka, a Romanian philanthropist in an obsessive search for the lost city of Zinj
- Grant Heslov as Richard, Peter's travel weary research assistant.
- Joe Don Baker as R.B. Travis, the CEO TraviCom who sends Karen to Zaire in search of his son
- Bruce Campbell as Charlie Travis, a TraviCom employee, Karen's ex-fiancé, and R.B.'s son who goes missing in Zaire
- Taylor Nichols as Jeffrey Weems, a TraviCom employee who accompanied Charlie to Zaire and went missing
- John Hawkes as Bob Driscoll, a TraviCom employee who accompanied Charlie to Zaire and went missing
- Adewale Akinnuoye-Agbaje as Kahega, Monroe's friend and deputy
- Shayna Fox as the voice of Amy, a mountain gorilla owned by Peter who wears a special backpack and high-tech glove that translates her sign language
  - Lola Noh & Misty Rosas provide the in-suit performers of Amy.
- Delroy Lindo as Captain Wanta, a Ugandan military officer
- Joe Pantoliano as Eddie Ventro, a tour guide in Uganda
- Thom Barry as Samahani, Monroe's truck driver and a member of the expedition
- Michael Chinyamurindi as Claude, a member of the Zaire expedition
- Fidel Bateke as Mizumu, a Zairean tribal leader
- James Karen as a college president, Peter's boss
- Mary Ellen Trainor as Moira, an attendee at Peter's college lecture
- Stuart Pankin as Boyd, an attendee at Peter's college lecture
- Peter Jason as Mr. Janus
- Jimmy Buffett as a 727 Pilot, who flies the expedition group over the Congo
- Darnell Suttles as a Ugandan Hospital Interrogator
- Kevin Grevioux as a roadblock officer

== Production ==
=== Development and writing ===
After the success of The First Great Train Robbery, Crichton decided to write a screenplay specifically for Sean Connery as the character Charles Munro, an archetypal "great white hunter" akin to H. Rider Haggard's hero Allan Quatermain. The film was envisioned as an homage to classic pulp adventure tales, and Crichton successfully pitched the movie to 20th Century Fox in 1979 without a fleshed out story. Crichton left the project when he learned that he could not use a real gorilla to portray the character of Amy. In an ironic twist, Connery portrayed Quatermain in his final film role, 2003's The League of Extraordinary Gentlemen It was offered to several directors including Steven Spielberg and John Carpenter. A brief attempt was made to revive the project in the late 1980s. Eventually, Frank Marshall directed the film with little, if any, involvement from Crichton. The film's teaser credits John Patrick Shanley and Crichton as co-screenwriters, but the trailer and the film itself credit Shanley alone.

Originally, Delroy Lindo was set to shoot his scene in the Dominican Republic, but ended up shooting it in Pasadena, California.

The gorilla suits for Amy the mountain gorilla and the gray gorillas as well as the hippopotamus puppet were created by Stan Winston's company Stan Winston Studio.

== Release ==
=== Marketing ===
A teaser trailer for Congo debuted in theaters on November 18, 1994, with the release of Star Trek Generations. It was also attached to the VHS release of Forrest Gump. Promotional partners included Taco Bell, Pepsi, and Kenner Products.

=== Home media ===
Congo was released on VHS and LaserDisc on November 21, 1995. The LaserDisc release is THX certified and consists of widescreen and pan and scan fullscreen versions, while also featuring a Dolby Digital AC-3 track. A widescreen VHS release debuted a year later on September 10, 1996. The DVD was released on July 27, 1999.

In 2024, ahead of the film's 30th anniversary, Vinegar Syndrome announced a 4K Blu-ray release of the film as part of their "Ultra" sub-label, under license from Paramount and newly remastered from the original film elements.

== Reception ==
=== Box office ===
Congo was estimated to gross $13–15 million in its opening weekend, but surprised the industry when it grossed $24.6 million for the weekend, placing number one at the US box office ahead of Casper. It was overtaken by Batman Forever during its second weekend. In the United States and Canada, the film grossed $81,022,101. The final worldwide gross was $152,022,101 versus a $50,000,000 budget.

=== Critical response ===
Rotten Tomatoes collected 54 reviews to give the film an approval rating of 24%. The site's consensus states: "Mired in campy visual effects and charmless characters, Congo is a suspenseless adventure that betrays little curiosity about the scientific concepts it purports to care about." Metacritic rated it 22/100 based on 19 reviews, meaning "generally unfavorable" reviews. Roger Ebert of Chicago Sun-Times rated it 3 out of 4 stars. He called the film a splendid example of a genre no longer much in fashion, the jungle adventure story. It was nominated for seven Golden Raspberry Awards. Hal Hinson of The Washington Post called the film a "Spielberg knockoff...shamelessly lifting themes and ideas from a handful of Steven's greatest hits." He criticized Amy the gorilla as "the most disappointing 'performance' of all" and opined that the supporting actors, Tim Curry and Ernie Hudson, stood out more than the lead actors.

The A.V. Club's Ignatiy Vishnevetsky said Congo was full of "goofy pleasures" like "delectably goofy" lasers and "mutant killer apes", calling it one of the most enjoyable films that came out of the post–Jurassic Park period. He said he enjoyed the film more as a campy comedy than as the thriller the trailers made it out to be, and concluded with "Is Congo a good film? It's certainly a good time."

=== Accolades ===
Award	Category	Subject	Result
Golden Raspberry Award	Worst New Star	Amy the Talking Gorilla	Nominated
Golden Raspberry Award	Worst Supporting Actress	Amy the Talking Gorilla	Nominated
Golden Raspberry Award	Worst Supporting Actor	Tim Curry	Nominated
Golden Raspberry Award	Worst Original Song	Jerry Goldsmith "(Feel) the Spirit of Africa"	Nominated
Golden Raspberry Award	Worst Screenplay	John Patrick Shanley	Nominated
Golden Raspberry Award	Worst Picture	Kathleen Kennedy; Sam Mercer	Nominated
Golden Raspberry Award	Worst Director	Frank Marshall	Nominated
Saturn Award	Best Science Fiction Film	Kathleen Kennedy; Sam Mercer	Nominated
Saturn Award	Best Director	Frank Marshall	Nominated

== Other media ==
=== Video game ===
A video game based on the film, Congo the Movie: The Lost City of Zinj, was released for Sega Saturn in 1996. A different game for the Super Nintendo Entertainment System and Sega Genesis was in development, but was cancelled. Another adventure game was released for PC and Macintosh called Congo the Movie: Descent into Zinj.

=== Pinball ===
A Williams pinball machine named Congo was produced in 1995 that was based on the film.
