= List of 2000 box office number-one films in the United States =

This is a list of films which have placed number one at the weekend box office in the United States during 2000.

== Number-one films ==
†	This implies the highest-grossing movie of the year.

#	Weekend end date	Film	Gross	Notes	Ref
1	January 9, 2000	Stuart Little	$11,214,503	Stuart Little became the first film since Forrest Gump to top the box office for three nonconsecutive weekends.	
2	January 16, 2000	Next Friday	$14,465,156		
3	January 23, 2000	Next Friday	$8,009,943		
4	January 30, 2000	Eye of the Beholder	$5,959,447		
5	February 6, 2000	Scream 3	$34,713,342	Scream 3 broke The Empire Strikes Back (Special Edition)'s record ($22 million) for the highest weekend debut in February and Scream 2's record ($32.9 million) for highest weekend debut for a horror film and a Miramax film. It also broke Wild Wild West's record for the widest release ever at 3,467 theaters.	
6	February 13, 2000	Scream 3	$16,318,053		
7	February 20, 2000	The Whole Nine Yards	$13,731,070		
8	February 27, 2000	The Whole Nine Yards	$9,563,311		
9	March 5, 2000	The Whole Nine Yards	$7,174,183		
10	March 12, 2000	Mission to Mars	$22,855,247		
11	March 19, 2000	Erin Brockovich	$28,138,465	Erin Brockovich broke Waterworld's record ($21.2 million) for the highest weekend debut for an environmentalist film.	
12	March 26, 2000	Erin Brockovich	$18,545,755		
13	April 2, 2000	Erin Brockovich	$13,798,460		
14	April 9, 2000	Rules of Engagement	$15,011,181		
15	April 16, 2000	Rules of Engagement	$10,933,627		
16	April 23, 2000	U-571	$19,553,310	U-571 broke Crimson Tide's record ($18.6 million) for the highest weekend debut for a submarine film.	
17	April 30, 2000	U-571	$12,203,655		
18	May 7, 2000	Gladiator	$34,819,017		
19	May 14, 2000	Gladiator	$24,645,129		
20	May 21, 2000	Dinosaur	$38,854,851	Dinosaur broke Tarzan's record for the widest release for a Disney film.	
21	May 28, 2000	Mission: Impossible 2	$57,845,297	Mission: Impossible 2 broke Austin Powers: The Spy Who Shagged Me's record ($54.1 million) for the highest weekend debut for a spy film and Mission: Impossible's record ($45.4 million) for the highest weekend debut for a film based on a TV show and a Paramount film. It had the highest weekend debut of 2000. It also broke Scream 3's record for the widest release ever at 3,653 theaters.	
22	June 4, 2000	Mission: Impossible 2	$27,016,029		
23	June 11, 2000	Gone in 60 Seconds	$25,336,048		
24	June 18, 2000	Shaft	$21,714,757		
25	June 25, 2000	Me, Myself & Irene	$24,209,385	In second place, Chicken Run's $17.5 million opening weekend broke Antz's record ($17.2 million) for the highest weekend debut for a DreamWorks Animation film. It also broke James and the Giant Peach's record ($7.5 million) for highest weekend debut for a stop motion film.	
26	July 2, 2000	The Perfect Storm	$41,325,042		
27	July 9, 2000	Scary Movie	$42,346,669	Scary Movie broke Air Force One's record ($37.1 million) for the highest weekend debut for an R-rated film and Twister's record ($41 million) for highest weekend debut for a film featuring a female protagonist.	
28	July 16, 2000	X-Men	$54,471,475	X-Men broke Men in Black's records ($51.1 million) for the highest weekend debut in July and for a non-sequel as well as Batman Forever's record ($52.7 million) for highest weekend debut for a superhero film. It was the first time that three films had opened with more than $40 million in three consecutive weekends.	
29	July 23, 2000	What Lies Beneath	$29,702,959		
30	July 30, 2000	Nutty Professor II: The Klumps	$42,518,830		
31	August 6, 2000	Hollow Man	$26,414,386		
32	August 13, 2000	Hollow Man	$13,048,132		
33	August 20, 2000	The Cell	$17,515,050		
34	August 27, 2000	Bring It On	$17,362,105		
35	September 3, 2000	Bring It On	$11,447,495		
36	September 10, 2000	The Watcher	$9,062,295		
37	September 17, 2000	The Watcher	$5,805,680		
38	September 24, 2000	Urban Legends: Final Cut	$8,505,513		
39	October 1, 2000	Remember the Titans	$20,905,831		
40	October 8, 2000	Meet the Parents	$28,623,300	Meet the Parents broke Antz's record ($17.2 million) for the highest weekend debut in October.	
41	October 15, 2000	Meet the Parents	$21,168,385		
42	October 22, 2000	Meet the Parents	$16,015,185		
43	October 29, 2000	Meet the Parents	$15,048,475	Meet the Parents became the first film since The Sixth Sense to top the box office for four consecutive weekends.	
44	November 5, 2000	Charlie's Angels	$40,128,550		
45	November 12, 2000	Charlie's Angels	$24,606,860		
46	November 19, 2000	How the Grinch Stole Christmas †	$55,082,330	How the Grinch Stole Christmas broke Home Alone 2: Lost in New York's record ($31.1 million) for the highest weekend debut for a Christmas-themed film and X-Men's record ($54.4 million) for the highest weekend debut for a non-sequel.	
47	November 26, 2000	How the Grinch Stole Christmas †	$52,118,445	How the Grinch Stole Christmas broke Star Wars: Episode I – The Phantom Menace's record ($51.4 million) for the highest second weekend gross. In second place, Unbreakable's $30.3 million opening weekend broke Sleepy Hollow's record ($30.0 million) for the highest weekend debut for a film that did not open in first place.	
48	December 3, 2000	How the Grinch Stole Christmas †	$27,096,630		
49	December 10, 2000	How the Grinch Stole Christmas †	$18,646,520	How the Grinch Stole Christmas became the first film since Meet the Parents to top the box office for four consecutive weekends.	
50	December 17, 2000	What Women Want	$33,614,543	What Women Want broke Scream 2's record ($32.9 million) for the highest weekend debut in December.	
51	December 24, 2000	Cast Away	$28,883,406		
52	December 31, 2000	Cast Away	$30,977,869		

== Highest-grossing films ==
=== Calendar Gross ===
Highest-grossing films of 2000 by Calendar Gross

Rank	Title	Studio(s)	Actor(s)	Director(s)	Gross
1.	How the Grinch Stole Christmas	Universal Pictures	Jim Carrey, Jeffrey Tambor, Christine Baranski, Bill Irwin, Taylor Momsen, Molly Shannon and Anthony Hopkins	Ron Howard	$251,628,705
2.	Mission: Impossible 2	Paramount Pictures	Tom Cruise, Dougray Scott, Thandiwe Newton, Richard Roxburgh, John Polson, Brendan Gleeson, Rade Šerbedžija and Ving Rhames	John Woo	$215,409,889
3.	Gladiator	DreamWorks Pictures	Russell Crowe, Joaquin Phoenix, Connie Nielsen, Oliver Reed, Derek Jacobi, Djimon Hounsou and Richard Harris	Ridley Scott	$186,610,052
4.	The Perfect Storm	Warner Bros. Pictures	George Clooney, Mark Wahlberg, Diane Lane, William Fichtner, Karen Allen, Bob Gunton, Mary Elizabeth Mastrantonio and John C. Reilly	Wolfgang Petersen	$182,618,434
5.	Meet the Parents	Universal Pictures	Robert De Niro, Ben Stiller, Blythe Danner, Teri Polo, James Rebhorn, Jon Abrahams and Owen Wilson	Jay Roach	$161,146,255
6.	X-Men	20th Century Fox	Patrick Stewart, Hugh Jackman, Ian McKellen, Halle Berry, Famke Janssen, James Marsden, Bruce Davison, Rebecca Romijn-Stamos, Ray Park, Tyler Mane and Anna Paquin	Bryan Singer	$157,299,718
7.	Scary Movie	Dimension Films	Jon Abrahams, Carmen Electra, Shannon Elizabeth, Anna Faris, Kurt Fuller, Regina Hall, Lochlyn Munro, Cheri Oteri, Dave Sheridan, Shawn Wayans and Marlon Wayans	Keenen Ivory Wayans	$157,019,771
8.	What Lies Beneath	DreamWorks Pictures	Harrison Ford, Michelle Pfeiffer and Diana Scarwid	Robert Zemeckis	$155,359,812
9.	Dinosaur	Walt Disney Studios	voices of D. B. Sweeney, Alfre Woodard, Ossie Davis, Max Casella, Hayden Panettiere, Samuel E. Wright, Julianna Margulies, Peter Siragusa, Joan Plowright and Della Reese	Ralph Zondag and Eric Leighton	$137,748,063
10.	Erin Brockovich	Universal Pictures	Julia Roberts, Albert Finney and Aaron Eckhart	Steven Soderbergh	$125,595,205

=== In-Year Release ===
Highest-grossing films of 2000 by In-year release
Rank	Title	Distributor	Domestic gross
1.	How the Grinch Stole Christmas	Universal	$260,044,825
2.	Cast Away	20th Century Fox	$233,632,142
3.	Mission: Impossible 2	Paramount	$215,409,889
4.	Gladiator	DreamWorks	$187,705,427
5.	What Women Want	Paramount	$182,811,707
6.	The Perfect Storm	Warner Bros.	$182,618,434
7.	Meet the Parents	Universal	$166,244,045
8.	X-Men	20th Century Fox	$157,299,718
9.	Scary Movie	Dimension	$157,019,771
10.	What Lies Beneath	DreamWorks	$155,464,351

Highest-grossing films by MPAA rating of 2000
G	Chicken Run
PG	How the Grinch Stole Christmas
PG-13	Cast Away
R	Gladiator

== See also ==
- List of American films — American films by year
- Lists of box office number-one films

== Chronology ==
Preceded by 1999	2000	Succeeded by 2001
