= Maximum Risk =

1996 American film directed by Ringo Lam

- Theatrical release poster
- Directed by: Ringo Lam
- Written by: Larry Ferguson
- Produced by: Moshe Diamant
- Starring: Jean-Claude Van Damme; Natasha Henstridge
- Cinematography: Alexander Gruszynski
- Edited by: Bill Pankow
- Music by: Robert Folk
- Production companies: Columbia Pictures; Roger Birnbaum Productions
- Distributed by: Sony Pictures Releasing
- Release date: September 13, 1996 (U.S.)
- Running time: 100 minutes
- Country: United States
- Language: English
- Budget: $25 million
- Box office: $51.7 million

Maximum Risk is a 1996 American action thriller film directed by Hong Kong filmmaker Ringo Lam in his American directorial debut, and starring Jean-Claude Van Damme and Natasha Henstridge. The plot follows French police detective Alain Moreau (Van Damme) as he becomes entangled in an international conspiracy encompassing Russian gangsters and corrupt American officials, with various parties after his life because of his uncanny resemblance to a dead mob informant. His only ally appears to be his doppelganger's girlfriend, Alex Bartlett (Henstridge).

The film was released in the United States on September 13, 1996. It received lukewarm reviews, but it was a moderate commercial success.

== Plot ==
A man is chased through the streets of Nice, France, ultimately resulting in his death. Police officer Alain Moreau is brought by his partner Sebastien to the scene because the victim's face is identical to Alain's. Matches found in his pocket point towards a hotel, where the proprietor mistakes Alain for "Mikhail Suverov" and gives him the phone message "Call Alex Bohemia." In Mikhail's room is a passport with the same birth date as Alain, and a plane ticket to New York City.

Alain's mother admits that he has a twin brother whom she gave up at birth because she was impoverished. Alain and Sebastian visit the office of the lawyer who adopted Mikhail. They find the room in flames, and a Russian man attacks Alain. He escapes with the adoption file, which reveals Mikhail was adopted by a Russian family who immigrated to the United States. Alain takes the passport and plane ticket to New York to investigate Mikhail's death.

In New York, Alain discovers Mikhail was a member of the Russian mafia. After mentioning Alex Bohemia, Alain is referred to the Bohemia Club in Little Odessa. There, a woman named Alex Bartlett mistakes him for Mikhail and gives him a key to a hotel room. Wary, Alain rents the room across the hall.

When Alex comes to meet him later, Alain reveals that he is Mikhail's brother. Ivan (who saw Mikhail in the club) and his thugs arrive to kill him, believing he is Mikhail. Alain and Alex escape. Alex says that Mikhail was her boyfriend and he had a plan to leave the Mafia. At Mikhail's home, Alain finds out Mikhail discovered his existence when he saw an article in the paper about his war exploits. After more Russians come to the house, Alain and Alex flee to her friend's cabin.

The next morning, two FBI agents come to the cabin. They say Mikhail kept evidence against the Mafia that he intended to turn over to them, wanting to reform. They want Alain to pose as Mikhail to access his safe deposit box back in Nice. In actuality, they want to destroy the evidence because it implicates them in colluding with the Mafia.

Realizing that the FBI and not the Mafia knew Mikhail was dead, Alain deduces that it was FBI agents who killed Mikhail, and refuses to cooperate. After a fight, Alain handcuffs the agents together and leaves with Alex to visit Kirov, the Mafia's leader. At a banya, Alain tells Kirov that Ivan was trying to kill him. Enraged, Kirov tells Alain the truth about the so-called evidence he has. Ivan then sends the big Russian thug to kill Kirov and Alain. In the ensuing scuffle Kirov dies. Alain escapes, but is arrested by NYPD. The two corrupt FBI agents find Alex and use her to force Alain, whom they bail out of jail, to access the deposit box.

Bank policy dictates that only Mikhail can access the safe deposit box, forcing the agents to wait outside while Alain passes for him. In the box is the evidence, and the banker also brings him a box in Alain's name. This one has thousands in cash, a gun and a tape recording from Mikhail explaining how he decided to escape the Mafia and reunite with his family. Alain instructs a banker to turn over the evidence to the US Embassy, and sets off the sprinkler system to make his escape. Ivan, waiting with Sebastien as his hostage, sends in the big Russian. The thug kills the banker and takes the evidence, but Alain catches up and kills him in the elevator.

Outside, police officers block off Ivan's escape, giving Alain time to catch up, shoot out Ivan's tires, and rescue Sebastien; Ivan dies in the wreckage. Alain then chases the agents into a meat locker, shoots them both and rescues Alex. Mikhail's evidence of Mafia collusion with the FBI leads to several arrests. Alain takes Alex to meet his mother so she can tell her about Mikhail.

== Cast ==
- Jean-Claude Van Damme as Alain Moreau / Mikhail Suverov
- Natasha Henstridge as Alex Bartlett
- Jean-Hugues Anglade as Sebastien
- Zach Grenier as Ivan Dzasokhov
- Paul Ben-Victor as Agent Pellman
- Frank Senger as Agent Loomis
- David Hemblen as Dmitri Kirov
- Stefanos Miltsakakis as "Red Face"
- Stéphane Audran as Chantal Moreau
- Frank van Keeken as Davis Hartley
- Dan Moran as Yuri
- Rob Kaman as Ilya
- Donald Burda as Nicholas
- Herbie Lovelle as Martin
- Albert Schultz as Agent Anderson
- Kamel Krifa as Boris
- Carlo Rota as Bohemia Bartender
- Joe Pingue and Hugh Thompson as Bohemia Doormen

== Production ==
Maximum Risk was the American film debut of Ringo Lam, whom Jean-Claude Van Damme personally approached to direct the film. Regarding the difference between Hong Kong and American filmmaking styles, Lam said "When I worked on Maximum Risk... I learned that they buy the whole street, they pay all the shops, every car, every extra, they are all paid, right? Everything under control - but that's not the case in Hong Kong."

The film was originally known as The Exchange, then it was retitled Bloodstone. Jason Friedberg and Aaron Seltzer, better known for Scary Movie and their other parodies, performed an uncredited rewrite on the film.

Filming took place on-location in Toronto, Canada (doubling for New York City), Nice and Paris, France. However, the train station sequence was actually shot in both New York and Philadelphia, as a comparable location didn’t exist in Toronto. The chase on the street and subway stairs was filmed at the real Brighton Beach station in Brooklyn, and the platform scenes were filmed at Philadelphia's Berks Market-Frankford Station.

Rémy Julienne was the film’s vehicular stunt coordinator.

== Release ==
Maximum Risk opened on September 13, 1996, and took the number one spot at the weekend box office in the United States, taking in $5.6 million in its first weekend. It grossed $14 million in total in the United States and Canada and $52 million worldwide.

It took the number one spot at the weekend box office in the United States, taking in $5.6 million in its first weekend.

== Reception ==
Rotten Tomatoes, a review aggregator, reports that 34% of 38 surveyed critics gave the film a positive review; the average rating was 4.5/10. Audiences polled by CinemaScore gave the film an average grade of "B−" on an A+ to F scale.

Leonard Klady of Variety wrote, "It's a visceral delight that refuses to be deterred by niceties of plot or character consistency and prefers sweat to emotion." Richard Harrington of The Washington Post wrote that the film depends too much on car chases, which end up dominating the film. Lawrence Van Gelder of The New York Times wrote, "From start to finish, 'Maximum Risk' presents spectacular stunts choreographed and coordinated by Charles Picerni and some hair-raising, stomach-churning automotive chases attributed to Remy Julienne, the French master of the art."

Kevin Thomas of the Los Angeles Times called it "a solid, fast-moving action-adventure" in which Van Damme "does some of his best acting yet". Conversely, Peter Stack of the San Francisco Chronicle criticized Van Damme's acting, which is "hobbled by a weak script that even veteran Hong Kong action director Ringo Lam can't salvage".

== See also ==
- Double Impact, a 1991 action film which also has Van Damme playing identical twins.
- Russian mafia in popular culture
