= Russian mafia in popular culture =

The Russian mafia has frequently been a subject of works in popular culture.

== Anime and manga ==
- The Japanese manga and anime series Black Lagoon prominently features the Hotel Moscow which is a branch of the Russian mafia that operates in the fictional Thailand city of Roanapur.
- Two characters in the Japanese light novel series Durarara!!, Simon Brezhnev and Dennis, are former Russian mafia members who run a sushi shop in Tokyo.
- The Russian mafia appears as a rival to the Yakuza in the manga Sanctuary.

== Comics ==
- A Russian crime syndicate known as the Tracksuit Mafia appears in Hawkeye and The Superior Spider-Man comic books.
- Russian mafioso are frequent antagonists in The Punisher.
- The Russian mafia play a large part in The Winter Men.

== Film ==
- Ivan Drago, his manager and his trainers from Rocky IV (1985) are members of a Russian organized crime syndicate.
- The main plotline in Assa (1988) takes place in Yalta during the winter of 1980 and follows a crime boss' young mistress who falls in love with an underground rock musician.
- In the joint Russian-American produced comedy Weather Is Good on Deribasovskaya, It Rains Again on Brighton Beach (1992), KGB and CIA agents must work together to bring down the head of the Russian mafia who is putting at risk high-level diplomatic talks between the President of the United States and the General Secretary of the Soviet Union.
- The Russian-Jewish mafia of Brooklyn is the subject of Little Odessa (1994).
- The character Valentin Dmitrovich Zukovsky (played by Robbie Coltrane), an ex-KGB agent-turned-Russian mafia head, appears in the James Bond films GoldenEye (1995) and The World Is Not Enough (1999).
- The antagonists in Fair Game (1995) are a crime group made up of rogue KGB operatives.
- The antagonist conspires to sell a thousand electronic pulse rifles to Sergei Petrovsky, a Russian mafia boss in Eraser (1996).
- In Maximum Risk (1996), the protagonist discovers that he had a twin brother who was in the Russian mafia and sets out to avenge his death at the hands of Russian mobsters.
- The Russian cult film Brother (1997) tells a story of a young mobster with a strong sense of loyalty in the 1990s St. Petersburg.
- The film Jungle 2 Jungle (1997) features a Russian mafia in New York City run by Alexei Jovanovic (played by David Ogden Stiers).
- In The Jackal (1997), a Russian mob boss hires the titular assassin to avenge the death of his brother.
- The Russian mafia are major antagonists in Ronin (1998), seeking the mysterious briefcase from an IRA splinter group in France.
- The film Rounders (1998) prominently features members of the Russian mafia.
- A Boston-based Russian mafia clan appears in The Boondock Saints (1999).
- The documentary film The Making of a New Empire (1999) follows Moscow-based Chechen mafia boss Khozh-Ahmed Noukhayev.
- Brother 2 (2000), the sequel to Brother (1997), takes place in Moscow and the United States.
- The Mark of Cain (2000) is a documentary on Russian criminal tattoos.
- Snatch (2000) features Serbian actor Rade Šerbedžija as Boris "The Blade" Yurinov aka Boris the Bullet Dodger, an ex-KGB ethnic Russian Uzbek criminal and arms-dealer operating in London's underworld.
- In the film Training Day (2001), Denzel Washington's character Alonzo Harris is trying to pay a ransom of money for his life after he assaulted a member of the Russian mafia in Las Vegas and took his money. His bosses known as the "Three Wise Men" state how they know that he owes money to the Russian mafia and suggest that he leaves town. In an attempt to escape via Los Angeles International Airport after being thwarted by his partner Jake Hoyt, Alonzo is killed by some Russian mafia operatives in the airport parking lot and the broadcast of his death over the news is hauntingly similar to the one he used to taunt Jake.
- The protagonist of 25th Hour (2002) is associated with the Russian mafia in New York City, despite being of Irish descent himself.
- The film Half Past Dead (2002) has a Russian car thief as the main character.
- The Russian film Tycoon (2002) shows the rise of a Russian oligarch from the Gorbachev era in the late '80s, to absolute power in the Yeltsin era in the '90s.
- The Russian cult B-film Antikiller (2002) shows the mafia hierarchy of the 1990s rather faithfully. It spawned two sequels, none of which repeated the success of the first film.
- Russian gangsters distributing ecstasy in Miami on behalf of a Cuban drug lord appear in Bad Boys II (2003).
- The Russian film Bimmer (2003) is road movie about four friends who get into trouble with the law and flee Moscow in a black BMW. As the men drive across the Russian expanse, they encounter corruption, violence, poverty and various situations characterizing the bleakness and challenges of small-town life in post-Soviet Russia. A sequel was released in 2006.
- The Russian film Dead Man's Bluff (2005) is a dark comedy portraying young mobsters in the 1990s Nizhny Novgorod.
- Russian mobsters operating from Brighton Beach feature briefly early in Lord of War (2005). The film tells the story of Ukrainian-American arms trafficker Yuri Orlov (played by Nicolas Cage and based on Viktor Bout) who also illegally acquires guns and tanks from his uncle, a former Soviet general.
- The film Eastern Promises (2007), subject of which is the Russian mafia in London.
- We Own the Night (2007) is centered around a manager of a Brighton Beach night club which is owned by the Russian mafia.
- In Batman: Gotham Knight (2008), the Russian Mob is depicted as being rivals of Sal Maroni's crime family and are led by Yuri "The Russian" Dimitrov (voiced by Corey Burton).
- Indiana Jones's main adversaries from Indiana Jones and the Kingdom of the Crystal Skull (2008) named Irina Spalko and Antonin Dovchenko are Russian mobsters.
- RocknRolla (2008) features Russian oligarch and his gangsters operating in London.
- Thieves by Law (2010) is a documentary film charting the rise of Russian organized crime in the wake of the fall of the Soviet Union.
- The Spy Next Door (2010) features Russian mobsters as antagonists and they are led by a crime boss named Anton Poldark.
- The 2010 musical adaptation of Matilda featured a member of the Russian Mafia named Sergei as well as his underlings.
- One in the Chamber (2012) involves warring former Soviet gangsters in the Czech Republic with the Russian Suverov crime family rivaling the Armenian mafia Tavanian crime family.
- The Russian film "Break Loose" (2014) (original title was «Восьмёрка», named after Lada Samara one of the characters is driving) depicts a personal conflict between young OMON operatives and a local crime boss.
- The protagonist in the Brooklyn-set film The Drop (2014) has his bar taken over by Chechen mobsters.
- The 2014 film adaptation of The Equalizer (which was directed by the same director of Training Day and also starring Denzel Washington) features the Russian mafia as the primary antagonists where they were led by Vladimir Pushkin (played by Vladimir Kulich).
- The protagonist of John Wick (2014), John Wick, goes to war with the Russian mafia after the boss' son steals his vintage muscle car and kills his dog. In this film, the Russian mafia (known as Tarasov Crime Family or Tarasov Mob) is led by Viggo Tarasov (played by Michael Nyqvist), a notorious, bloodthirsty and vicious Russian mafia boss, John Wick's former employer and the film's main antagonist.
- Our Kind of Traitor (2016) is a British spy thriller film adapted from John le Carré's novel of the same name.
- Triple 9 (2016) is an American heist action thriller film directed by John Hillcoat and written by Matt Cook.
- Red Sparrow (2018) is a spy thriller film involving a seductress working for the Russian Mafia named Dominika Egorova based on a book by Jason Matthews of the same name.

== Literature ==
- The Pyramid. The Soviet Mafia, a 1990 novel by Telman Gdlyan and Evgeny Dodolev.
- Russian and, even more prominently, Chechen mafia appear in Martin Cruz Smith's 1992 crime novel Red Square.
- A 1995 novel "No time for Heroes" by Brian Freemantle features a conspiracy by Russian mafia.
- Since 1998, Russian publishing house "Eksmo" has been printing crime novels under the series "I am a thief by law" («Я-вор в законе»).
- The Russian mafia serve as antagonists in Eoin Colfer's Artemis Fowl: The Arctic Incident (2002), with protagonist Artemis Fowl II trying to rescue his father, a former Irish crime lord, after he is kidnapped by Russian gangsters near Murmansk.
- Tom Clancy's Splinter Cell (2004) and Tom Clancy's Splinter Cell: Operation Barracuda (2005) involve a Russia and Ukraine-based terrorist arms dealing organization named "The Shop", headed by Andrei Zdrok.
- Our Kind of Traitor, a 2010 novel by John le Carré.
- In 2013, Alexei Sherstobitov wrote an autobiography called "The Liquidator" («Ликвидатор»), detailing his life as a hitman for the Russian mafia.
- Paul-Henri Guiter, L'Étoile noire, un aventurier au cœur de la Russie souterraine, Arthaud Edition ISBN 978-2-0813-7600-7, Paris, France, 2017, an autobiographical novel in the Russian mafia.

== Television ==
- In the Elementary season 2 episode Ancient History (2x05), the murder victim, Leo Banim or Vitaly Andropov (played by Dean Neistat) and the entire crime are connected with the Russian mafia, more precisely the Polish branch of a notorious Russian mafia group, the Rukovskaya Bratva. According to Sherlock Holmes (Jonny Lee Miller), Leo Banim (the episode's murder victim), whose real name was Vitaly Andropov, is believed to be one of Rukovskaya Bratva's biggest hitman in Warsaw, Poland.
- In CSI: Miami, the Russian mafia is led by the Ivan Sarnoff (played by Andrew Divoff), a vicious and bloodthirsty Russian mobster and a recurring and tough enemy of Horatio Caine (David Caruso) and his team.
- In the seasons 3 and 4 of Billions, Grigor Andolov (played by John Malkovich) is a Russian oligarch who is the boss of his own criminal group, is known for being ruthless and has several connections in the criminal underworld.
- The Russian mafia is the main theme of McMafia: the main protagonist, Alex Godman (played by James Norton) is a Russian British son of a Russian mafia boss living in London, England. His father, Dimitri Godman (played by Aleksei Serebryakov is the leader of Godman family and a mobster of a considerable influence. Another important character linked to the Russian Mafia is Semiyon Kleiman (played by David Strathairn), a notorious Russian Israeli businessman who is implied to have connections with the Russian Mafia.
- The Solntsevskaya Bratva has a recurring role in the CW TV series Arrow. Oliver Queen has contacts in the organization who he uses to locate criminals. In the Arrowverse, the Pakhan (or leader) of the Solntsevskaya Bratva is Anatoli Knyazev or KGBeast (played by David Nykl).
- The popular Russian TV mini-series Brigada, aired in 2002, depicted a group of underdogs rising the crime ladder to become oligarchs in the 1990s Moscow. Their leader here is Alexandr Belov aka Belyy/White (played by Sergey Bezrukov).
- In the Criminal Minds season 2 episode Honor Among Thieves (2x20), the Behavioral Analysis Unit (or BAU) is on the hunt for a killer responsible for the murders of Russian immigrants in the USA. It turns out a while later that the criminal was a member of the Russian Mafia and that he was murdered by his own father, a powerful Russian Mafia boss named Arseny Lysowsky (played by Elya Baskin).
- The TV series Gotham features Russian mafia family formerly allied to Sicilian gangster Carmine Falcone. They later turns against him with the alliance of Fish Mooney and her gang. The Russian mafia was first led by Nikolai (played by Jeremy Davidson) until he was killed by Oswald Cobblepot during a raid orchestrated by rival Italian Mob boss Sal Maroni. In the episode "Harvey Dent," the rest of the Russian mafia was led by Gregor Kasyanov (played by Steve Cirbus) where they spring explosives expert Ian Hargrove from a prison transport to construct bombs for them. The mobsters target a cache of Falcone's money, but are stopped by the police. During a standoff with the Gotham City Police Department, Gregor and some of the Russian mafia operatives are nearly killed by a bomb that Butch Gilzean set off on Fish Mooney's behalf in order to destroy the money and hurt Falcone.
- The final episodes of the Law & Order Season 9 (1998–99) center around the Russian mafia in Manhattan and their attempts to sabotage prosecution. In this case, the Russian mafia is led by Constantin Volsky (played by Olek Krupa). The Russian mob also figures prominently in the Season 1 (1990–91) episode The Serpent's Tooth (1x19) (also guest-starring Olek Krupa) and the Season 4 (93–94) episode Old Friends (4x22).
- In Law & Order: Special Victims Unit, the Russian mafia is a recurring enemy to the Special Victims Unit. The Russian mafia in this case is led by Sergei Perlman (played by Grigori Gurvich) in season 4 and led by Liev Bodrov (played by Gary Hope) in season 13.
- In Law & Order: Criminal Intent season 1 episode Maledictus (1x19), the murder victim of this episode, Ilana Yushka (played by Alla Kliouka Schaffer) was an author and daughter of a prominent Russian mobster.
- In the Netflix prison series Orange Is the New Black, Galina "Red" Reznikova (played by Kate Mulgrew) is in the prison for her involvement with the Russian mafia in Queens. In Orange Is the New Black, the Queens branch of the Russian mafia is led by Ganya (played by David Ross), Galina's ruthless boss.
- In the HBO Series Oz, the Russian mafia was represented by Jewish-Russian Mafia member Nikolai Stanislofsky (played by Philip Casnoff) and by Cossack hitman Yuri Kosygin (played by Olek Krupa). Kosygin is described in the show as "the most ruthless hitman in Little Odessa".
- The FX series Sons of Anarchy portrays illegal gun trading with the Russian Mob. Here, the Russian mafia is led by Viktor Putlova (played by Keith Szarabajka) and has a recurring role in the season 1, season 4 and season 5 as one of SAMCRO's biggest enemies for control of the territory in Northern California and Oregon.
- In The Sopranos, there were many references and interactions with the Russian mafia. In this case, the New Jersey branch of the Russian mafia is led by Slava Malevsky (played by Frank Ciornei).
- The Brighton Beach-based Yogorov crime family appears in the first three seasons of Person of Interest and is led by Ivan Yogorov (played by Olek Krupa).
- The Netflix's series Bordertown is a Finnish series that has one of the main characters as a former Bratva member. The character in question is the Detective Constable Lena Jaakkola (played by Anu Sinisalo) and secretly is (both) a member of the Russian mafia and an agent of the FSB.
- The TNT series Claws portrays the main characters becoming involved with the Russian mafia in Central Florida. In Claws the Russian mafia was first led by Riva (played by Andrea Sooch) and later by Zlata Ostrovsky (played by Franka Potente), Riva's sister and they have a bloody rivalry with the Dixie Mafia and the Haitian Mob.
- In the season 4 of Queen of the South, the Russian mafia is based in Atlanta, Georgia, is led by Oksana Volkova (played by Vera Cherny) and has business with Teresa Mendoza (played by Alice Braga), the main protagonist of Queen of the South, the founder and head of the powerful Mendoza Cartel, one of the most powerful Mexican drug cartels.
- In the Netflix South African series Queen Sono, the main villain of the series is Ekaterina Gromova (played by Kate Liquorish), a Russian high level military contractor and the heiress of the Gromova crime family, a prominent Russian mafia family based in South Africa and the enemy of Queen Sono (played by Pearl Thusi), the protagonist of the series.
- In the series Average Joe, the main characters confront the Russian mafia in Pittsburgh, Pennsylvania.

== Theatre ==
- The Russian mafia make an appearance in Matilda the Musical, despite being absent from the original novel. They are sold dodgy cars by Mr Wormwood, and come after him for revenge after noticing this, forcing Wormwood and his family to flee to Spain, in stark contrast with the novel, where they flee to Spain to avoid prosecution. Matilda encounters them at the climax of the play, where she impresses them by revealing that she can speak Russian. Impressed by Matilda's intelligence, the Russian mafia let her family go.

== Video games ==
- The Russian mafia appears in multiple Grand Theft Auto games:
  - The Russian mafia appears in Grand Theft Auto 2 (1999).
  - Also in Grand Theft Auto: San Andreas (2004) one of the missions involves Big Smoke taking CJ down to a Hotel in Los Santos where they meet up with a group of Russian mobsters.
  - In the Grand Theft Auto IV (2008) video game, the main protagonist, Niko Bellic and Luis Lopez, were allied with the Russian mafia, only to be betrayed in the later part of the storylines. One of the game's main antagonists are powerful Russian crime lords named Dimitri Rascalov and Ray Bulgarin.
- The main antagonist in Hitman 2: Silent Assassin (2002) is a Russian crime lord named Sergei Zavorotko.
- The main antagonist in Max Payne 2: The Fall of Max Payne is a Russian mob boss named Vladimir Lem.
- A Russian black market arms trading syndicate known as the Zemy appears in the first mission of SOCOM U.S. Navy SEALs (2002).
- Antikiller is a licensed PC game based on the eponymous gangster movie. It came out in 2005 (Russian market) and 2007 (international market), respectively.
- The biggest crime syndicate in The Getaway: Black Monday (2004) are a Russian crime syndicate known as "Thieves in Law", led by Viktor Skobel (a powerful arms dealer, businessman, mob boss and the game's main antagonist) and are the biggest crime syndicate in London after the downfall of the Bethnal Green Mob (the main antagonists of 2002's The Getaway)
- Mercenaries: Playground of Destruction (2005) features the North Korea branch of a Moscow-based Russian mafia group, led by Sergei Voronov before he is usurped by Josef Yurinov, which engages in war profiteering and black market arms dealing.
- The SWAT 4 (2005) expansion pack SWAT 4: The Stechkov Syndicate includes seven new missions featuring the fictional Stetchkov crime family.
- A London-based Russian mafia group called the Zahharov Organization, led by Vladislav Zakharov, is one of five playable gangs in Gangs of London (2006).
- One of three gangs in Crackdown (2007) is the Volk (Russian for "Wolf"), which is made up of former soldiers from Eastern Europe.
- The Hotline Miami games prominently feature the Russian mafia.
  - Hotline Miami (2012) features the Russian mafia as a group of antagonists, as well as the primary enemies.
  - Hotline Miami 2: Wrong Number features the Russian mafia again as enemies and as a protagonist faction in different levels.
- In the espionage RPG Alpha Protocol (2010), the protagonist must navigate a conflict between two rival Moscow organized crime groups, one of which is allied with the corrupt defense contractor the protagonist opposes.
- The San Francisco-based bratva, an offshoot of the Brighton Beach mafia, appears in Watch Dogs 2 (2016), hiding within the city's Jewish population and undertake massive laundering operations and human trafficking schemes.
- Russian mafia is featured in 2003 video game RoadKill, which is known as the "Dreg Lords". They drive garbage trucks, wearing bodypaints and are one of the player's enemies in later parts of the game.
- Mother Russia Bleeds features the Russian mafia being in control of the Soviet Union and pushing a experimental drug trafficking operation. They serve as the primary antagonist for the protagonists.
