= List of 1997 box office number-one films in the United States =

This is a list of films which have placed number one at the weekend box office in the United States during 1997.

== Number-one films ==
†	This implies the highest-grossing movie of the year.

#	Weekend end date	Film	Total weekend gross	Notes	Ref
1	January 5, 1997	Michael	$12,144,926		
2	January 12, 1997	The Relic	$9,064,143		
3	January 19, 1997	Beverly Hills Ninja	$12,220,920		
4	January 26, 1997	Jerry Maguire	$5,518,727	Jerry Maguire reclaimed #1 in its sixth week of release.	
5	February 2, 1997	Star Wars (Special Edition)	$35,906,661	Star Wars (Special Edition) broke 12 Monkeys' record ($13.8 million) for the highest weekend debut in January and Indiana Jones and the Temple of Doom's record ($33.9 million) for the highest weekend debut for a PG-rated film.	
6	February 9, 1997	Star Wars (Special Edition)	$24,277,091	In second place, Dante's Peak ($18.4 million) broke Wayne's World's record ($18.1 million) for the highest weekend debut in February.	
7	February 16, 1997	Star Wars (Special Edition)	$21,370,589		
8	February 23, 1997	The Empire Strikes Back (Special Edition)	$21,975,993	Star Wars: Episode V – The Empire Strikes Back (Special Edition) broke Dante's Peak's record ($18.4 million) for the highest weekend debut in February (which had been set two weeks earlier).	
9	March 2, 1997	The Empire Strikes Back (Special Edition)	$13,145,852		
10	March 9, 1997	Private Parts	$14,616,333		
11	March 16, 1997	Return of the Jedi (Special Edition)	$16,293,531		
12	March 23, 1997	Liar Liar	$31,423,025	Liar Liar broke Teenage Mutant Ninja Turtles's record ($25.4 million) for the highest weekend debut in March and for the highest weekend debut for a spring release.	
13	March 30, 1997	Liar Liar	$25,377,435		
14	April 6, 1997	Liar Liar	$18,275,295		
15	April 13, 1997	Anaconda	$16,620,887		
16	April 20, 1997	Anaconda	$12,013,566		
17	April 27, 1997	Volcano	$14,581,740		
18	May 4, 1997	Breakdown	$12,307,128		
19	May 11, 1997	The Fifth Element	$17,031,345		
20	May 18, 1997	The Fifth Element	$11,410,863		
21	May 25, 1997	The Lost World: Jurassic Park	$72,132,785	The Lost World: Jurassic Park had the widest release of all-time opening in 3,565 theaters and broke Batman Forever's records ($52.7 mil) for the highest weekend debut in the summer, for a PG-13 rated film, and of all time. It also broke Jurassic Park's record ($47.0 mil) for the highest weekend debut for a creature feature film and Mission: Impossible's records ($45.4 mil) for the highest weekend debut in May and for the Memorial Day weekend. The Lost World: Jurassic Park had the highest weekend debut in 1997.	
22	June 1, 1997	The Lost World: Jurassic Park	$34,116,390		
23	June 8, 1997	Con Air	$24,131,738		
24	June 15, 1997	Speed 2: Cruise Control	$16,158,942		
25	June 22, 1997	Batman & Robin	$42,872,605		
26	June 29, 1997	Face/Off	$23,387,530		
27	July 6, 1997	Men in Black †	$51,068,455	Men in Black broke Independence Day's records ($50.2 mil) for the highest weekend debut in July and the highest Fourth of July weekend debut.	
28	July 13, 1997	Men in Black †	$30,062,317		
29	July 20, 1997	Men in Black †	$19,029,928		
30	July 27, 1997	Air Force One	$37,132,505	Air Force One broke Interview with the Vampire's record ($36.4 mil) for the highest weekend debut for an R-rated film.	
31	August 3, 1997	Air Force One	$25,731,622		
32	August 8, 1997	Conspiracy Theory	$19,313,566		
33	August 17, 1997	Cop Land	$13,510,482		
34	August 24, 1997	G.I. Jane	$11,094,241		
35	August 31, 1997	G.I. Jane	$8,183,861		
36	September 7, 1997	Fire Down Below	$6,073,094		
37	September 14, 1997	The Game	$14,337,029		
38	September 21, 1997	In & Out	$15,019,821		
39	September 28, 1997	The Peacemaker	$12,311,939		
40	October 5, 1997	Kiss the Girls	$13,215,167		
41	October 12, 1997	Kiss the Girls	$11,122,441		
42	October 19, 1997	I Know What You Did Last Summer	$15,818,645	I Know What You Did Last Summer broke Freddy's Dead: The Final Nightmare's record ($12.9 million) for highest weekend debut for a slasher film.	
43	October 26, 1997	I Know What You Did Last Summer	$12,507,880		
44	November 2, 1997	I Know What You Did Last Summer	$9,406,297		
45	November 9, 1997	Starship Troopers	$22,058,773		
46	November 16, 1997	The Jackal	$15,164,595		
47	November 23, 1997	Mortal Kombat Annihilation	$16,771,694		
48	November 30, 1997	Flubber	$26,725,207		
49	December 7, 1997	Flubber	$11,292,933		
50	December 14, 1997	Scream 2	$32,926,342	Scream 2 broke Beavis and Butt-Head Do America's record ($20.1 million) for the highest weekend debut in December and I Know What You Did Last Summer's record ($15.8 million) for the highest weekend debut for a slasher film.	
51	December 21, 1997	Titanic	$28,638,131	Titanic held the record for the highest-grossing film of all time ($1.8 billion) until Avatar surpassed it on January 24, 2010.	
52	December 28, 1997	Titanic	$35,455,673	Titanic broke Scream 2's record ($32.9 mil) for the highest weekend gross in December (which had been set two weeks earlier).	

== Highest-grossing films ==
=== Calendar Gross ===
Highest-grossing films of 1997 by Calendar Gross

Rank	Title	Studio(s)	Actor(s)	Director(s)	Gross
1.	Men in Black	Columbia Pictures	Tommy Lee Jones, Will Smith, Linda Fiorentino, Vincent D'Onofrio, Tony Shalhoub and Rip Torn	Barry Sonnenfeld	$250,690,539
2.	The Lost World: Jurassic Park	Universal Pictures	Jeff Goldblum, Julianne Moore, Pete Postlethwaite, Arliss Howard, Vince Vaughn, Vanessa Lee Chester, Richard Schiff, Peter Stormare and Richard Attenborough	Steven Spielberg	$229,086,679
3.	Liar Liar	Universal Pictures	Jim Carrey, Maura Tierney, Justin Cooper, Jennifer Tilly, Cary Elwes, Amanda Donohoe, Jason Bernard, Swoosie Kurtz and Anne Haney	Tom Shadyac	$181,410,615
4.	Air Force One	Columbia Pictures	Harrison Ford, Gary Oldman, Wendy Crewson, Paul Guilfoyle, William H. Macy, Liesel Matthews, Dean Stockwell and Glenn Close	Wolfgang Petersen	$171,482,545
5.	Star Wars (Special Edition)	20th Century Fox	Mark Hamill, Harrison Ford, Carrie Fisher, Peter Cushing, Alec Guinness, David Prowse, James Earl Jones, Anthony Daniels, Kenny Baker and Peter Mayhew	George Lucas	$137,690,767
6.	My Best Friend's Wedding	TriStar Pictures	Julia Roberts, Dermot Mulroney, Cameron Diaz, Rupert Everett and Philip Bosco	P. J. Hogan	$127,120,029
7.	Titanic	Paramount Pictures	Leonardo DiCaprio, Kate Winslet, Billy Zane, Kathy Bates, Frances Fisher, Bernard Hill, Jonathan Hyde, Danny Nucci, David Warner, Gloria Stuart, Suzy Amis and Bill Paxton	James Cameron	$112,594,173
8.	Face/Off	Paramount Pictures	John Travolta, Nicolas Cage, Joan Allen, Gina Gershon, Alessandro Nivola and Colm Feore	John Woo	$112,276,146
9.	Batman & Robin	Warner Bros. Pictures	Arnold Schwarzenegger, George Clooney, Chris O'Donnell, Uma Thurman, Alicia Silverstone, Michael Gough, Pat Hingle and Elle Macpherson	Joel Schumacher	$107,325,195
10.	George of the Jungle	Walt Disney Studios	Brendan Fraser, Leslie Mann, Thomas Haden Church, Holland Taylor, Richard Roundtree, John Cleese and Keith Scott	Sam Weisman	$105,263,257

=== In-Year Release ===
Highest-grossing films of 1997 by In-year release
Rank	Title	Studio	Domestic gross
1.	Titanic	Paramount/20th Century Fox	$600,788,188
2.	Men in Black	Sony	$250,690,539
3.	The Lost World: Jurassic Park	Universal	$229,086,679
4.	Liar Liar	Universal	$181,410,615
5.	Air Force One	Sony	$172,956,409
6.	As Good as It Gets	Sony	$148,478,011
7.	Good Will Hunting	Miramax	$138,433,435
8.	Star Wars (Special Edition)	20th Century Fox	$138,257,865
9.	My Best Friend's Wedding	Sony	$127,120,029
10.	Tomorrow Never Dies	MGM	$125,304,276

Highest-grossing films by MPAA rating of 1997
G	Hercules
PG	Star Wars (Special Edition)
PG-13	Titanic
R	Air Force One

== See also ==
- List of American films — American films by year
- Lists of box office number-one films

== Chronology ==
Preceded by 1996	1997	Succeeded by 1998
