= List of 1995 box office number-one films in the United States =

This is a list of films which have placed number one at the weekend box office in the United States during 1995.

== Number-one films ==
| † | This implies the highest-grossing movie of the year. |

| # | Weekend end date | Film | Total weekend gross | Notes | Ref |
|---|---|---|---|---|---|
| 1 | January 8, 1995 | Dumb and Dumber | $9,177,151 | | |
| 2 | January 16, 1995^{4-day weekend} | Legends of the Fall | $14,038,128 | Legends of the Fall reached number one in its first weekend of wide release and fourth overall week. It was the highest-grossing wide debut in January beating Philadelphia's $13.8 million. | |
| 3 | January 22, 1995 | Legends of the Fall | $9,006,330 | | |
| 4 | January 29, 1995 | Legends of the Fall | $6,309,990 | | |
| 5 | February 5, 1995 | Legends of the Fall | $5,111,888 | Legends of the Fall and Dumb and Dumber became the first two films to consecutively top the box office for four consecutive weekends each since Stakeout and Fatal Attraction in 1987. | |
| 6 | February 12, 1995 | Billy Madison | $6,639,080 | | |
| 7 | February 20, 1995^{4-day weekend} | The Brady Bunch Movie | $14,827,066 | | |
| 8 | February 26, 1995 | The Brady Bunch Movie | $8,379,037 | | |
| 9 | March 5, 1995 | Man of the House | $9,473,317 | | |
| 10 | March 12, 1995 | Outbreak | $13,420,387 | | |
| 11 | March 19, 1995 | Outbreak | $10,808,607 | | |
| 12 | March 26, 1995 | Outbreak | $8,006,220 | | |
| 13 | April 2, 1995 | Tommy Boy | $8,027,843 | | |
| 14 | April 9, 1995 | Bad Boys | $15,523,358 | | |
| 15 | April 16, 1995 | Bad Boys | $11,016,040 | | |
| 16 | April 23, 1995 | While You Were Sleeping | $9,288,915 | | |
| 17 | April 30, 1995 | While You Were Sleeping | $10,491,714 | | |
| 18 | May 7, 1995 | French Kiss | $9,018,022 | | |
| 19 | May 14, 1995 | Crimson Tide | $18,612,190 | | |
| 20 | May 21, 1995 | Die Hard with a Vengeance | $22,162,245 | | |
| 21 | May 28, 1995 | Casper | $16,840,385 | | |
| 22 | June 4, 1995 | Casper | $13,409,610 | | |
| 23 | June 11, 1995 | Congo | $24,642,539 | Congo broke Alien 3's record ($23.1 million) for highest weekend debut for a film featuring a female protagonist. | |
| 24 | June 18, 1995 | Batman Forever † | $52,784,433 | Batman Forever broke Jurassic Park's records ($47 million) for the highest weekend debut in June, for a summer release, a PG-13 rated film, and of all-time. It also broke Batman Returns' records ($45.6 million) for the highest weekend debut for a superhero film and a Warner Bros. film. Batman Forever was the first film ever to gross more than $50 million in one weekend (3 days) and had the highest weekend debut of 1995. | |
| 25 | June 25, 1995 | Pocahontas | $29,531,619 | Pocahontas broke Congo's record ($24.1 million) for highest weekend debut for a film featuring a female protagonist (which was set 2 weeks ago). | |
| 26 | July 2, 1995 | Apollo 13 | $25,353,380 | | |
| 27 | July 9, 1995 | Apollo 13 | $19,635,095 | | |
| 28 | July 16, 1995 | Apollo 13 | $15,630,650 | | |
| 29 | July 23, 1995 | Apollo 13 | $12,457,260 | | |
| 30 | July 30, 1995 | Waterworld | $21,171,780 | | |
| 31 | August 6, 1995 | Waterworld | $13,452,035 | | |
| 32 | August 13, 1995 | Dangerous Minds | $14,931,503 | | |
| 33 | August 20, 1995 | Mortal Kombat | $23,283,887 | Mortal Kombat broke Street Fighter's record ($9 million) for the highest weekend debut of a video game adaptation. | |
| 34 | August 27, 1995 | Mortal Kombat | $10,309,925 | | |
| 35 | September 4, 1995^{4-day weekend} | Mortal Kombat | $8,288,323 | | |
| 36 | September 10, 1995 | To Wong Foo, Thanks for Everything! Julie Newmar | $9,019,180 | | |
| 37 | September 17, 1995 | To Wong Foo, Thanks for Everything! Julie Newmar | $6,544,960 | | |
| 38 | September 24, 1995 | Seven | $13,949,807 | Seven broke Freddy's Dead: The Final Nightmare's record ($12.9 million) for the highest weekend debut in September. | |
| 39 | October 1, 1995 | Seven | $12,378,647 | | |
| 40 | October 8, 1995 | Seven | $10,421,517 | | |
| 41 | October 15, 1995 | Seven | $8,645,354 | | |
| 42 | October 22, 1995 | Get Shorty | $12,700,007 | | |
| 43 | October 29, 1995 | Get Shorty | $10,202,007 | | |
| 44 | November 5, 1995 | Get Shorty | $9,700,007 | | |
| 45 | November 12, 1995 | Ace Ventura: When Nature Calls | $37,804,076 | Ace Ventura: When Nature Calls broke Home Alone 2: Lost in New York's record ($31.1 million) for the highest weekend debut for a comedy film and Interview with the Vampire's record ($36.4 million) for the highest weekend debut in November. | |
| 46 | November 19, 1995 | GoldenEye | $26,205,007 | GoldenEye broke Clear and Present Danger's record ($20.3 million) for the highest weekend debut for a spy film. | |
| 47 | November 26, 1995 | Toy Story | $29,140,617 | Toy Story broke Back to the Future Part II's record ($27.8 million) for the highest Thanksgiving weekend debut. | |
| 48 | December 3, 1995 | Toy Story | $20,164,662 | | |
| 49 | December 10, 1995 | Toy Story | $13,879,803 | | |
| 50 | December 17, 1995 | Jumanji | $11,084,370 | | |
| 51 | December 25, 1995^{4-day weekend} | Waiting to Exhale | $14,126,927 | | |
| 52 | January 1, 1996^{4-day weekend} | Toy Story | $19,395,010 | Toy Story reclaimed #1 in its sixth weekend of release. | |

== Highest-grossing films ==
=== Calendar Gross ===
Highest-grossing films of 1995 by Calendar Gross

| Rank | Title | Studio(s) | Actor(s) | Director(s) | Gross |
|---|---|---|---|---|---|
| 1. | Batman Forever | Warner Bros. Pictures | Val Kilmer, Tommy Lee Jones, Jim Carrey, Nicole Kidman, Chris O'Donnell, Michael Gough and Pat Hingle | Joel Schumacher | $184,031,112 |
| 2. | Apollo 13 | Universal Pictures | Tom Hanks, Kevin Bacon, Bill Paxton, Gary Sinise, Ed Harris and Kathleen Quinlan | Ron Howard | $172,071,312 |
| 3. | Toy Story | Walt Disney Studios | voices of Tom Hanks, Tim Allen, Don Rickles, Jim Varney, Wallace Shawn, John Ratzenberger, Annie Potts, R. Lee Ermey, John Morris, Laurie Metcalf and Erik von Detten | John Lasseter | $146,198,683 |
| 4. | Pocahontas | Walt Disney Studios | voices of Irene Bedard, Mel Gibson, David Ogden Stiers, John Kassir, Russell Means, Christian Bale, Linda Hunt, Danny Mann, Billy Connolly, Frank Welker, Judy Kuhn, Michelle St. John and Gordon Tootoosis | Mike Gabriel and Eric Goldberg | $139,213,552 |
| 5. | Ace Ventura: When Nature Calls | Warner Bros. Pictures | Jim Carrey, Ian McNeice, Simon Callow, Maynard Eziashi and Bob Gunton | Steve Oedekerk | $103,970,943 |
| 6. | Casper | Universal Pictures | Christina Ricci, Bill Pullman, Cathy Moriarty and Eric Idle | Brad Silberling | $100,328,194 |
| 7. | Die Hard with a Vengeance | 20th Century Fox | Bruce Willis, Jeremy Irons, Samuel L. Jackson, Graham Greene, Colleen Camp, Larry Bryggman and Sam Phillips | John McTiernan | $92,731,700 |
| 8. | Crimson Tide | Walt Disney Studios | Denzel Washington, Gene Hackman, George Dzundza, Viggo Mortensen, James Gandolfini and Matt Craven | Tony Scott | $91,387,195 |
| 9. | GoldenEye | MGM/UA Distribution Co. | Pierce Brosnan, Sean Bean, Izabella Scorupco, Famke Janssen and Joe Don Baker | Martin Campbell | $91,349,839 |
| 10. | Waterworld | Universal Pictures | Kevin Costner, Dennis Hopper, Jeanne Tripplehorn, Tina Majorino and Michael Jeter | Kevin Reynolds | $88,246,220 |

=== In-Year Release ===
Highest-grossing films of 1995 by In-year release
| Rank | Title | Distributor | Domestic gross |
|---|---|---|---|
| 1. | Toy Story | Disney | $191,796,233 |
| 2. | Batman Forever | Warner Bros. | $184,031,112 |
| 3. | Apollo 13 | Universal | $172,071,312 |
| 4. | Pocahontas | Disney | $141,579,773 |
| 5. | Ace Ventura: When Nature Calls | Warner Bros. | $108,385,533 |
| 6. | GoldenEye | Metro-Goldwyn-Mayer | $106,429,941 |
| 7. | Jumanji | TriStar | $100,475,249 |
| 8. | Casper | Universal | $100,328,194 |
| 9. | Seven | New Line Cinema | $100,125,643 |
| 10. | Die Hard with a Vengeance | 20th Century Fox | $100,012,499 |

Highest-grossing films by MPAA rating of 1995
| G | Toy Story |
| PG | Apollo 13 |
| PG-13 | Batman Forever |
| R | Seven |

== See also ==
- List of American films — American films by year
- Lists of box office number-one films

== Chronology ==
| Preceded by 1994 | 1995 | Succeeded by 1996 |
