= List of 1998 box office number-one films in the United States =

This is a list of films which have placed number one at the weekend box office in the United States during 1998.

== Number-one films ==
†	This implies the highest-grossing movie of the year.

#	Weekend end date	Film	Box office	Notes	Ref
1	January 4, 1998	Titanic †	$33,315,278		
2	January 11, 1998	Titanic †	$28,716,310	Titanic became the first film since The Birdcage to top the box office for four consecutive weekends.	
3	January 18, 1998	Titanic †	$30,010,633	Titanic became the first film since The Fugitive to top the box office for five consecutive weekends and gross more than $20 million for five weekends.	
4	January 25, 1998	Titanic †	$25,238,720	Titanic became the first film since The Fugitive to top the box office for six consecutive weekends. It also became the first film since Jerry Maguire to top the box office in its sixth weekend.	
5	February 1, 1998	Titanic †	$25,907,172	Titanic became the first film since Home Alone to top the box office for seven consecutive weekends. It also became the first film since Forrest Gump to top the box office in its seventh weekend.	
6	February 8, 1998	Titanic †	$23,027,838	Titanic became the first film since Home Alone to top the box office for eight consecutive weekends. It also became the first film since Aladdin to top the box office in its eighth weekend.	
7	February 15, 1998	Titanic †	$28,167,947	Titanic became the first film since Home Alone to top the box office for nine consecutive weekends. It also became the first film since Forrest Gump to top the box office in its ninth weekend.	
8	February 22, 1998	Titanic †	$21,036,343	Titanic became the first film since Home Alone to top the box office for ten consecutive weekends as well as the first film since Forrest Gump to top the box office in its tenth weekend. It also became the first film to gross more than $10 million for ten consecutive weekends. It reaches that level for another six weekends.	
9	March 1, 1998	Titanic †	$19,633,056	Titanic became the first film since Home Alone to top the box office for eleven consecutive weekends.	
10	March 8, 1998	Titanic †	$17,605,849	Titanic became the first film since Home Alone to top the box office for twelve consecutive weekends.	
11	March 15, 1998	Titanic †	$17,578,815	Titanic became the first film since Beverly Hills Cop to top the box office for thirteen consecutive weekends. Initial estimates had The Man in the Iron Mask as the number one film.	
12	March 22, 1998	Titanic †	$17,165,239	Titanic became the first film since Star Wars to top the box office for fourteen consecutive weekends. It also became the first film since E.T. the Extra-Terrestrial to top the box office in its fourteenth weekend.	
13	March 29, 1998	Titanic †	$15,213,500	Titanic became one of only two films to top the box office for fifteen consecutive weekends. It also became the first film since Beverly Hills Cop to top the box office in its fifteenth weekend. It set a new record for the most consecutive weekends at #1 of the modern era.	
14	April 5, 1998	Lost in Space	$20,154,919	Lost in Space broke Indecent Proposal's record ($18.4 mil) for the highest weekend debut in April.	
15	April 12, 1998	City of Angels	$15,369,048		
16	April 19, 1998	City of Angels	$12,332,194		
17	April 26, 1998	The Big Hit	$10,809,424		
18	May 3, 1998	He Got Game	$7,610,663		
19	May 10, 1998	Deep Impact	$41,152,375		
20	May 17, 1998	Deep Impact	$23,266,622		
21	May 24, 1998	Godzilla	$44,047,541	Godzilla had the highest weekend debut in 1998.	
22	May 31, 1998	Godzilla	$18,020,444		
23	June 7, 1998	The Truman Show	$31,542,121		
24	June 14, 1998	The Truman Show	$20,010,580		
25	June 21, 1998	The X-Files	$30,138,758		
26	June 28, 1998	Doctor Dolittle	$29,014,324		
27	July 5, 1998	Armageddon	$36,089,972		
28	July 12, 1998	Lethal Weapon 4	$34,048,124		
29	July 19, 1998	The Mask of Zorro	$22,525,855		
30	July 26, 1998	Saving Private Ryan	$30,576,104		
31	August 2, 1998	Saving Private Ryan	$23,601,801		
32	August 9, 1998	Saving Private Ryan	$17,398,000		
33	August 16, 1998	Saving Private Ryan	$13,157,819	Saving Private Ryan became the first film since Titanic to top the box office for four consecutive weekends.	
34	August 23, 1998	Blade	$17,073,856		
35	August 30, 1998	Blade	$10,925,976		
36	September 6, 1998	There's Something About Mary	$10,920,201	There's Something About Mary reached #1 in its eighth weekend of release. It also became the first film since Titanic to top the box office in its eighth weekend.	
37	September 13, 1998	Rounders	$8,459,126		
38	September 20, 1998	Rush Hour	$33,001,803	Rush Hour broke The First Wives Club's record ($18.9 mil) for the highest weekend debut in September.	
39	September 27, 1998	Rush Hour	$21,202,929		
40	October 4, 1998	Antz	$17,195,160	Antz broke Stargate's record ($16.7 mil) for the highest weekend debut in October.	
41	October 11, 1998	Antz	$14,713,918		
42	October 18, 1998	Practical Magic	$13,104,694		
43	October 25, 1998	Pleasantville	$8,855,063		
44	November 1, 1998	Vampires	$9,106,497		
45	November 8, 1998	The Waterboy	$39,414,071	The Waterboy broke Ace Ventura: When Nature Calls's record ($37.8 mil) for the highest weekend debut in November.	
46	November 15, 1998	The Waterboy	$24,431,129		
47	November 22, 1998	The Rugrats Movie	$27,321,470	The Rugrats Movie broke Beavis and Butt-Head Do America's record ($20.1 million) for the highest weekend debut for a non-Disney animated film.	
48	November 29, 1998	A Bug's Life	$33,258,052		
49	December 6, 1998	A Bug's Life	$17,174,218		
50	December 13, 1998	Star Trek: Insurrection	$22,052,836		
51	December 20, 1998	You've Got Mail	$18,426,749		
52	December 27, 1998	Patch Adams	$25,262,280		

== Highest-grossing films ==
=== Calendar gross ===
Highest-grossing films of 1998 by calendar gross:

Rank	Title	Studio(s)	Actor(s)	Director(s)	Gross
1.	Titanic	Paramount Pictures	Leonardo DiCaprio, Kate Winslet, Billy Zane, Kathy Bates, Frances Fisher, Bernard Hill, Jonathan Hyde, Danny Nucci, David Warner, Gloria Stuart, Suzy Amis and Bill Paxton	James Cameron	$488,194,015
2.	Armageddon	Walt Disney Studios	Bruce Willis, Billy Bob Thornton, Liv Tyler, Ben Affleck, Will Patton, Peter Stormare, Keith David and Steve Buscemi	Michael Bay	$198,798,517
3.	Saving Private Ryan	DreamWorks Pictures/Paramount Pictures	Tom Hanks, Edward Burns, Matt Damon, Tom Sizemore, Barry Pepper, Giovanni Ribisi, Vin Diesel, Adam Goldberg and Jeremy Davies	Steven Spielberg	$190,805,259
4.	There's Something About Mary	20th Century Fox	Cameron Diaz, Matt Dillon, Ben Stiller, Lee Evans and Chris Elliott	Peter Farrelly; Bobby Farrelly	$174,422,745
5.	The Waterboy	Walt Disney Studios	Adam Sandler, Kathy Bates, Fairuza Balk, Jerry Reed and Henry Winkler	Frank Coraci	$147,895,431
6.	Dr. Dolittle	20th Century Fox	Eddie Murphy, Ossie Davis, Oliver Platt, Jeffrey Tambor, Peter Boyle, Richard Schiff, Raven-Symoné, Kyla Pratt, Norm MacDonald and Chris Rock	Betty Thomas	$144,156,605
7.	Deep Impact	Paramount Pictures	Robert Duvall, Téa Leoni, Elijah Wood, Vanessa Redgrave, Maximilian Schell and Morgan Freeman	Mimi Leder	$140,464,664
8.	Godzilla	TriStar Pictures	Matthew Broderick, Jean Reno, Maria Pitillo, Hank Azaria, Kevin Dunn, Michael Lerner and Harry Shearer	Roland Emmerich	$136,314,294
9.	Rush Hour	New Line Cinema	Jackie Chan, Chris Tucker, Tom Wilkinson, Chris Penn, Elizabeth Peña, Tzi Ma, Ken Leung, Mark Rolston and Rex Linn	Brett Ratner	$136,065,335
10.	Good Will Hunting	Miramax	Robin Williams, Matt Damon, Ben Affleck, Stellan Skarsgård and Minnie Driver	Gus Van Sant	$133,793,781

=== In-year release ===
Highest-grossing films of 1998 by in-year release
Rank	Title	Distributor	Domestic gross
1.	Saving Private Ryan	DreamWorks/Paramount	$216,540,909
2.	Armageddon	Disney	$201,578,182
3.	There's Something About Mary	20th Century Fox	$176,484,651
4.	A Bug's Life	Disney	$162,798,565
5.	The Waterboy	Disney	$161,491,646
6.	Dr. Dolittle	20th Century Fox	$144,156,605
7.	Rush Hour	New Line Cinema	$141,186,864
8.	Deep Impact	Paramount	$140,464,664
9.	Godzilla	TriStar	$136,314,294
10.	Patch Adams	Universal	$135,026,902

Highest-grossing films by MPAA rating of 1998
G	A Bug's Life
PG	The Truman Show
PG-13	Armageddon
R	Saving Private Ryan

== See also ==
- List of American films — American films by year
- Lists of box office number-one films

== Chronology ==
Preceded by 1997	1998	Succeeded by 1999
