= List of 1999 box office number-one films in the United States =

This is a list of films which have placed number one at the weekend box office in the United States during 1999.

== Number-one films ==
†	This implies the highest-grossing movie of the year.

#	Weekend end date	Film	Box office	Notes	Ref
1	January 3, 1999	Patch Adams	$19,050,675		
2	January 10, 1999	A Civil Action	$15,163,484	A Civil Action reached #1 its third weekend of limited release.	
3	January 17, 1999	Varsity Blues	$15,204,148		
4	January 24, 1999	Varsity Blues	$10,574,508		
5	January 31, 1999	She's All That	$16,065,430	She's All That broke Spice World's record ($10.5 million) for the highest Super Bowl weekend debut.	
6	February 7, 1999	Payback	$21,221,526		
7	February 14, 1999	Message in a Bottle	$18,852,976		
8	February 21, 1999	Payback	$10,268,237	Payback reclaimed number 1 in its third weekend of release.	
9	February 28, 1999	8mm	$14,252,888		
10	March 7, 1999	Analyze This	$18,383,507		
11	March 14, 1999	Analyze This	$15,567,669		
12	March 21, 1999	Forces of Nature	$13,510,728		
13	March 28, 1999	Forces of Nature	$9,439,629		
14	April 4, 1999	The Matrix	$27,788,331	The Matrix broke Lost in Space's record ($20.2 million) for the highest weekend debut in April and Indecent Proposal's record ($18.4 mil) for the highest Easter weekend debut.	
15	April 11, 1999	The Matrix	$22,563,331		
16	April 18, 1999	Life	$20,414,775		
17	April 25, 1999	The Matrix	$12,642,717	The Matrix reclaimed number 1 in its fourth weekend of release.	
18	May 2, 1999	Entrapment	$20,145,595		
19	May 9, 1999	The Mummy	$43,369,635	The Mummy sets the record for a non-holiday May opening.	
20	May 16, 1999	The Mummy	$24,856,320		
21	May 23, 1999	Star Wars: Episode I – The Phantom Menace †	$64,820,970	Star Wars: Episode I – The Phantom Menace's $28.5 million opening day gross broke The Lost World: Jurassic Park's record ($26.1 million) for the highest single-day tally of all-time and Independence Day's record ($17.4 million) for the highest-grossing Wednesday of all-time. It also broke Indiana Jones and the Temple of Doom's record ($33.9 million) for the highest weekend debut for a prequel and Star Wars (Special Edition)'s record ($35.9 million) for the highest weekend debut for a PG-rated film. It had the highest weekend debut of 1999.	
22	May 30, 1999	Star Wars: Episode I – The Phantom Menace †	$51,399,863	Star Wars: Episode I – The Phantom Menace broke Jurassic Park's record ($38.5 million) for the highest second weekend gross.	
23	June 6, 1999	Star Wars: Episode I – The Phantom Menace †	$32,891,653		
24	June 13, 1999	Austin Powers: The Spy Who Shagged Me	$54,917,604	Austin Powers: The Spy Who Shagged Me broke Batman Forever's record ($52.8 million) for the highest weekend debut in June, Mission: Impossible's record ($45.4 million) for the highest weekend debut for a spy film and Ace Ventura: When Nature Callss record ($37.8 million) for the highest weekend debut for a comedy. It was the first sequel to gross more in its opening weekend than the original grossed in its entire run.	
25	June 20, 1999	Tarzan	$34,221,968		
26	June 27, 1999	Big Daddy	$41,536,370		
27	July 4, 1999	Wild Wild West	$27,687,484		
28	July 11, 1999	American Pie	$18,709,680		
29	July 18, 1999	Eyes Wide Shut	$21,706,163		
30	July 25, 1999	The Haunting	$33,435,140		
31	August 1, 1999	Runaway Bride	$35,055,556		
32	August 8, 1999	The Sixth Sense	$26,681,262	The Sixth Sense broke The Fugitive's record ($23.8 million) for the highest weekend debut in August.	
33	August 15, 1999	The Sixth Sense	$25,764,991		
34	August 22, 1999	The Sixth Sense	$23,950,008		
35	August 29, 1999	The Sixth Sense	$20,099,149	The Sixth Sense became the first film since Saving Private Ryan to top the box office for four consecutive weekends.	
36	September 5, 1999	The Sixth Sense	$22,896,967	The Sixth Sense broke The Fugitive's record ($17.2 million) for the highest Labor Day weekend ever. It was only the second film after Titanic to gross more than $20 million for five weekends. It was also the first film since Titanic to top the box office for five consecutive weekends.	
37	September 12, 1999	Stigmata	$18,309,666		
38	September 19, 1999	Blue Streak	$19,208,806		
39	September 26, 1999	Double Jeopardy	$23,162,542		
40	October 3, 1999	Double Jeopardy	$17,018,808		
41	October 10, 1999	Double Jeopardy	$13,541,285		
42	October 17, 1999	Fight Club	$11,035,485		
43	October 24, 1999	The Best Man	$9,031,660		
44	October 31, 1999	House on Haunted Hill	$15,946,032		
45	November 7, 1999	The Bone Collector	$16,712,020		
46	November 14, 1999	Pokémon: The First Movie	$31,036,678	Pokémon: The First Movie broke Mortal Kombat's record ($23.2 million) for the highest weekend debut for a video game adaptation and The Rugrats Movie's record ($27.3 million) for the highest weekend debut for a non-Disney animated film.	
47	November 21, 1999	The World Is Not Enough	$35,519,007		
48	November 28, 1999	Toy Story 2	$57,388,839	Toy Story 2 broke The Waterboy's record ($39.4 million) for the highest weekend debut in November and for the holiday season. It also broke 101 Dalmatians' record ($33.5 million) for the highest Thanksgiving weekend debut, and The Lion King's records ($40.9 million) for the highest weekend debut for an animated film and a G-rated film.	
49	December 5, 1999	Toy Story 2	$27,760,276		
50	December 12, 1999	Toy Story 2	$18,249,880		
51	December 19, 1999	Stuart Little	$15,018,223		
52	December 26, 1999	Any Given Sunday	$13,584,625		
53	January 2, 2000	Stuart Little	$16,022,757	Stuart Little reclaimed the number 1 spot in its third weekend of release.	

== Highest-grossing films ==
=== Calendar Gross ===
Highest-grossing films of 1999 by Calendar Gross

Rank	Title	Studio(s)	Actor(s)	Director(s)	Gross
1.	Star Wars: Episode I – The Phantom Menace	20th Century Fox	Liam Neeson, Ewan McGregor, Natalie Portman, Jake Lloyd, Ian McDiarmid, Anthony Daniels, Kenny Baker, Pernilla August and Frank Oz	George Lucas	$430,281,928
2.	The Sixth Sense	Walt Disney Studios	Bruce Willis, Toni Collette, Olivia Williams and Haley Joel Osment	M. Night Shyamalan	$276,113,671
3.	Austin Powers: The Spy Who Shagged Me	New Line Cinema	Mike Myers, Heather Graham, Michael York, Robert Wagner, Seth Green and Elizabeth Hurley	Jay Roach	$206,041,479
4.	Toy Story 2	Walt Disney Studios	voices of Tom Hanks, Tim Allen, Joan Cusack, Kelsey Grammer, Don Rickles, Wallace Shawn, John Ratzenberger, Jim Varney, Annie Potts, Estelle Harris and Wayne Knight	John Lasseter	$199,843,054
5.	The Matrix	Warner Bros. Pictures	Keanu Reeves, Laurence Fishburne, Carrie-Anne Moss, Hugo Weaving and Joe Pantoliano	The Wachowskis	$171,479,930
6.	Tarzan	Walt Disney Studios	voices of Tony Goldwyn, Minnie Driver, Glenn Close, Alex D. Linz, Rosie O'Donnell, Brian Blessed, Nigel Hawthorne, Lance Henriksen, Wayne Knight and Taylor Dempsey	Kevin Lima and Chris Buck	$170,867,780
7.	Big Daddy	Columbia Pictures	Adam Sandler, Joey Lauren Adams, Jon Stewart, Rob Schneider, Cole Sprouse, Dylan Sprouse and Leslie Mann	Dennis Dugan	$163,479,795
8.	The Mummy	Universal Pictures	Brendan Fraser, Rachel Weisz, John Hannah, Arnold Vosloo, Jonathan Hyde and Kevin J. O'Connor	Stephen Sommers	$155,385,488
9.	Runaway Bride	Paramount Pictures	Julia Roberts, Richard Gere, Joan Cusack, Héctor Elizondo, Rita Wilson and Paul Dooley	Garry Marshall	$152,005,535
10.	The Blair Witch Project	Artisan	Heather Donahue, Michael C. Williams and Joshua Leonard	Daniel Myrick and Eduardo Sánchez	$140,539,099

=== In-Year Release ===
Highest-grossing films of 1999 by In-year release
Rank	Title	Distributor	Domestic gross
1.	Star Wars: Episode I – The Phantom Menace	20th Century Fox	$431,088,295
2.	The Sixth Sense	Disney	$293,506,292
3.	Toy Story 2	Disney	$245,852,179
4.	Austin Powers: The Spy Who Shagged Me	New Line Cinema	$206,040,086
5.	The Matrix	Warner Bros.	$171,479,930
6.	Tarzan	Disney	$171,091,819
7.	Big Daddy	Columbia	$163,479,795
8.	The Mummy	Universal	$155,385,488
9.	Runaway Bride	Paramount	$152,257,509
10.	The Blair Witch Project	Artisan	$140,539,099

Highest-grossing films by MPAA rating of 1999
G	Toy Story 2
PG	Star Wars: Episode I – The Phantom Menace
PG-13	The Sixth Sense
R	The Matrix

== See also ==
- List of American films — American films by year
- Lists of box office number-one films

== Chronology ==
Preceded by 1998	1999	Succeeded by 2000
