= List of 1996 box office number-one films in the United States =

This is a list of films which have placed number one at the weekend box office in the United States during 1996.

== Number-one films ==
†	This implies the highest-grossing movie of the year.

#	Weekend end date	Film	Total weekend gross	Notes	Ref
1	January 7, 1996	12 Monkeys	$13,842,990	12 Monkeys broke Good Morning, Vietnam's record ($11.7 million) for the highest weekend debut in January.	
2	January 14, 1996	12 Monkeys	$9,974,510		
3	January 21, 1996	From Dusk till Dawn	$10,240,805		
4	January 28, 1996	Mr. Holland's Opus	$8,297,082	Mr. Holland's Opus reached #1 in its second week of release.	
5	February 4, 1996	Black Sheep	$10,593,609		
6	February 11, 1996	Broken Arrow	$15,583,510		
7	February 18, 1996	Broken Arrow	$11,704,778		
8	February 25, 1996	Rumble in the Bronx	$9,858,380		
9	March 3, 1996	Up Close & Personal	$11,101,955		
10	March 10, 1996	The Birdcage	$18,275,828	The Birdcage was number one for the most weeks (4) in 1996.	
11	March 17, 1996	The Birdcage	$16,034,306		
12	March 24, 1996	The Birdcage	$13,294,404		
13	March 31, 1996	The Birdcage	$10,106,414		
14	April 7, 1996	Primal Fear	$9,871,222		
15	April 14, 1996	Primal Fear	$8,108,561		
16	April 21, 1996	Primal Fear	$6,585,472		
17	April 28, 1996	The Quest	$7,029,120		
18	May 5, 1996	The Craft	$6,710,995		
19	May 12, 1996	Twister	$41,059,405	Twister broke Lethal Weapon 3's record ($33.2 mil) for the highest weekend debut in May and Pocahontas's record ($29.5 million) for highest weekend debut for a film featuring a female protagonist.	
20	May 19, 1996	Twister	$37,093,440		
21	May 26, 1996	Mission: Impossible	$45,436,830	Mission: Impossible was the first film to open in more than 3,000 theaters and broke Twister's record ($41.1 mil) for the highest weekend debut in May (which was set 2 weeks ago). It also broke The Flintstones' records ($29.7 mil) for the highest Memorial Day weekend debut and for a film based on a television show, GoldenEye's record ($26.2 million) for the highest weekend debut for a spy film, and Indiana Jones and the Last Crusade's record ($29.4 mil) for the highest weekend debut for a Paramount film. In second place, Twister broke Jurassic Park's record ($27.7 million) for the highest third weekend gross.	
22	June 2, 1996	Mission: Impossible	$21,629,362		
23	June 9, 1996	The Rock	$25,069,525		
24	June 16, 1996	The Cable Guy	$19,806,226		
25	June 23, 1996	Eraser	$24,566,446		
26	June 30, 1996	The Nutty Professor	$25,411,725		
27	July 7, 1996	Independence Day †	$50,228,264	Independence Day broke Terminator 2: Judgment Day's records ($31.7 mil) for the highest weekend debut in July and for the Fourth of July weekend. It also broke The Lion King's record ($40.8 mil) for the highest weekend debut for an original film. Independence Day had the highest weekend debut of 1996.	
28	July 14, 1996	Independence Day †	$35,242,709		
29	July 21, 1996	Independence Day †	$21,274,817		
30	July 28, 1996	A Time to Kill	$14,823,159		
31	August 4, 1996	A Time to Kill	$13,262,934		
32	August 11, 1996	Jack	$11,191,496		
33	August 18, 1996	Tin Cup	$10,128,834		
34	August 25, 1996	The Island of Dr. Moreau	$9,101,987		
35	September 1, 1996	The Crow: City of Angels	$9,785,111	Highest Labor Day weekend debut.	
36	September 8, 1996	Bulletproof	$6,014,400		
37	September 15, 1996	Maximum Risk	$5,612,707		
38	September 22, 1996	The First Wives Club	$18,913,411	The First Wives Club broke Seven's record ($13.9 mil) for the highest weekend debut in September.	
39	September 29, 1996	The First Wives Club	$15,314,530		
40	October 6, 1996	The First Wives Club	$11,017,356		
41	October 13, 1996	The Ghost and the Darkness	$9,215,063		
42	October 20, 1996	Sleepers	$12,305,745		
43	October 27, 1996	Sleepers	$9,605,059		
44	November 3, 1996	Romeo + Juliet	$11,133,231		
45	November 10, 1996	Ransom	$34,216,088		
46	November 17, 1996	Space Jam	$27,528,529		
47	November 24, 1996	Star Trek: First Contact	$30,716,131		
48	December 1, 1996	101 Dalmatians	$33,504,025	101 Dalmatians broke Toy Story's record ($29.1 million) for the highest Thanksgiving weekend debut.	
49	December 8, 1996	101 Dalmatians	$13,944,053		
50	December 15, 1996	Jerry Maguire	$17,084,296		
51	December 22, 1996	Beavis and Butt-Head Do America	$20,114,233	Beavis and Butt-Head Do America broke Star Trek VI: The Undiscovered Country's record ($18.1 million) for the highest weekend debut in December and The Land Before Time's record ($7.5 million) for the highest weekend debut for a non-Disney animated film.	
52	December 29, 1996	Michael	$17,435,711		

== Highest-grossing films ==
=== Calendar Gross ===
Highest-grossing films of 1996 by Calendar Gross

Rank	Title	Studio(s)	Actor(s)	Director(s)	Gross
1.	Independence Day	20th Century Fox	Will Smith, Bill Pullman, Jeff Goldblum, Mary McDonnell, Judd Hirsch, Margaret Colin, Randy Quaid, Robert Loggia, James Rebhorn and Harvey Fierstein	Roland Emmerich	$306,156,090
2.	Twister	Warner Bros. Pictures	Helen Hunt, Bill Paxton, Jami Gertz, Cary Elwes and Philip Seymour Hoffman	Jan de Bont	$241,721,524
3.	Mission: Impossible	Paramount Pictures	Tom Cruise, Jon Voight, Emmanuelle Béart, Henry Czerny, Jean Reno, Ving Rhames, Kristin Scott Thomas and Vanessa Redgrave	Brian De Palma	$180,981,856
4.	The Rock	Walt Disney Studios	Sean Connery, Nicolas Cage, Ed Harris, Michael Biehn and William Forsythe	Michael Bay	$134,069,511
5.	The Nutty Professor	Universal Pictures	Eddie Murphy, Jada Pinkett, James Coburn, Dave Chappelle, Larry Miller and John Ales	Tom Shadyac	$128,814,019
6.	Ransom	Walt Disney Studios	Mel Gibson, Rene Russo, Gary Sinise, Delroy Lindo and Lili Taylor	Ron Howard	$125,502,048
7.	The Birdcage	United Artists	Robin Williams, Gene Hackman, Nathan Lane, Dianne Wiest, Dan Futterman, Calista Flockhart, Hank Azaria and Christine Baranski	Mike Nichols	$124,060,553
8.	A Time to Kill	Warner Bros. Pictures	Sandra Bullock, Samuel L. Jackson, Matthew McConaughey, Kevin Spacey, Brenda Fricker, Oliver Platt, Charles S. Dutton, Ashley Judd, Patrick McGoohan and Donald Sutherland	Joel Schumacher	$108,766,007
9.	101 Dalmatians	Walt Disney Studios	Glenn Close, Jeff Daniels, Joely Richardson and Joan Plowright	Stephen Herek	$108,240,682
10.	The First Wives Club	Paramount Pictures	Bette Midler, Goldie Hawn, Diane Keaton, Maggie Smith, Dan Hedaya, Bronson Pinchot and Marcia Gay Harden	Hugh Wilson	$105,489,203

=== In-Year Release ===
Highest-grossing films of 1996 by In-year release
Rank	Title	Distributor	Domestic gross
1.	Independence Day	20th Century Fox	$306,169,268
2.	Twister	Warner Bros.	$241,721,524
3.	Mission: Impossible	Paramount Pictures	$180,981,856
4.	Jerry Maguire	TriStar Pictures	$153,952,592
5.	Ransom	Walt Disney Studios	$136,492,681
6.	101 Dalmatians	Walt Disney Studios	$136,189,294
7.	The Rock	Walt Disney Studios	$134,069,511
8.	The Nutty Professor	Universal Pictures	$128,814,019
9.	The Birdcage	Metro-Goldwyn-Mayer	$124,060,553
10.	A Time to Kill	Warner Bros.	$108,766,007

Highest-grossing films by MPAA rating of 1996
G	101 Dalmatians
PG	Space Jam
PG-13	Independence Day
R	Jerry Maguire

== See also ==
- List of American films — American films by year
- Lists of box office number-one films

== Chronology ==
Preceded by 1995	1996	Succeeded by 1997
