= Congo: Descent Into Zinj =

1995 video game

Congo The Movie: Descent into Zinj
- Windows cover
- Developer: Illumina Productions
- Publisher: Viacom New Media
- Platforms: Windows, Classic Mac OS
- Release: 1995
- Genre: Adventure
- Mode: Single-player

Congo: Descent Into Zinj is a 1995 sci-fi adventure game by Viacom New Media.

The game was developed by Illumina Productions, a video game development company and a subsidiary of Illumination Studios.

Versions for the SNES and Genesis was planned by Visual Concepts, but never got off the ground.
