= The Sixth Sense =

1999 film by M. Night Shyamalan

- Theatrical release poster
- Directed by: M. Night Shyamalan
- Written by: M. Night Shyamalan
- Produced by: Frank Marshall; Kathleen Kennedy; Barry Mendel
- Starring: Bruce Willis; Toni Collette; Olivia Williams; Haley Joel Osment
- Cinematography: Tak Fujimoto
- Edited by: Andrew Mondshein
- Music by: James Newton Howard
- Production companies: Hollywood Pictures; Spyglass Entertainment; The Kennedy/Marshall Company; Barry Mendel Productions
- Distributed by: Buena Vista Pictures Distribution
- Release dates: August 2, 1999 (Prince Music Theater); August 6, 1999 (United States)
- Running time: 107 minutes
- Country: United States
- Language: English
- Budget: $40 million
- Box office: $672.8 million

The Sixth Sense is a 1999 American psychological thriller film written and directed by M. Night Shyamalan. It stars Bruce Willis as a child psychologist whose patient (Haley Joel Osment) claims he can see and talk to the dead.

Released by Buena Vista Pictures through its Hollywood Pictures banner on August 6, 1999, The Sixth Sense was well received by critics and was nominated for six Academy Awards, including Best Picture, Best Director and Best Original Screenplay for Shyamalan, Best Supporting Actor for Osment, and Best Supporting Actress for Toni Collette. The film established Shyamalan as a preeminent filmmaker of thrillers and introduced the public to his affinity for twist endings.

The film was a commercial success, grossing over $672 million worldwide, becoming the second-highest-grossing film of 1999 and Shyamalan's highest-grossing film to date.

== Plot ==
In Philadelphia, child psychologist Malcolm Crowe is at home with his wife Anna. Suddenly, Vincent Grey, a former patient he had treated years ago, breaks into their house. He accuses Malcolm of failing him before shooting him and then killing himself.

The next fall, Malcolm has begun working with Cole Sear, a nine-year-old boy who reminds him of Vincent. He feels he must help him in order to rectify his own failure to help Vincent and to reconcile with Anna, who has become cold and distant towards him since the shooting. Lynn Sear, Cole's mother, worries about her son—especially after seeing mysterious signs of physical harm.

At a birthday party, when bullies see that Cole is scared of a cupboard, they lock him in it, causing him to scream in terror about someone seemingly inside with him. Once released, he faints and appears to have been physically assaulted, which his mother attributes to the bullies. Following this, Cole confides to Malcolm that he sees dead people.

Malcolm believes Cole is schizophrenic and may have to be institutionalized, and considers dropping his case. However, after listening to an audiotape from a session with Vincent, he hears a man begging for help in Spanish when Vincent was supposedly alone in the room, suggesting that he had the same ability. Malcolm realizes that Cole is telling the truth and suggests that he try to communicate with the ghosts and help them in order to overcome his fears.

One night, Cole finds Kyra Collins, a female child ghost, vomiting. He works out who she is and goes with Malcolm to the funeral reception at her home, where she recently died after a long illness. In her room, Kyra guides Cole to a videotape that he gives to her father. The tape reveals that her mother poisoned Kyra's food, alerting her father to the cause of her death and saving her younger sister.

Having gained a new sense of confidence upon using his abilities, Cole is given a lead part in his school play. He is coached by a ghost director and gives his performance with Malcolm looking on. Before leaving, Cole suggests Malcolm try speaking to Anna while she is asleep, so she can hear his thoughts and feelings.

After school that day, Cole tells Lynn his secret. When she does not believe him, he tells her that his deceased grandmother visits him, describing details from his mother's childhood that he could not have known. Shocked and emotional, Lynn believes him.

Malcolm returns home to find his wedding video playing and Anna talking in her sleep, asking him why he left her. She drops his wedding ring, and he notices that it is not on his finger. Recalling what Cole told him about dead people not knowing they are dead and only seeing what they want to see, Malcolm locates his own gunshot injury, and realizes that he did not survive being shot by Vincent and has been dead the entire time while working with Cole.

Coming to terms with the fact that he is a ghost himself, Malcolm lets Anna know that he had to help someone. He tells her that she was never second to anything or anyone and that he loves her. Anna's face relaxes, indicating she is at peace and can move on, so Malcolm's spirit departs in a flash of light.

== Cast ==
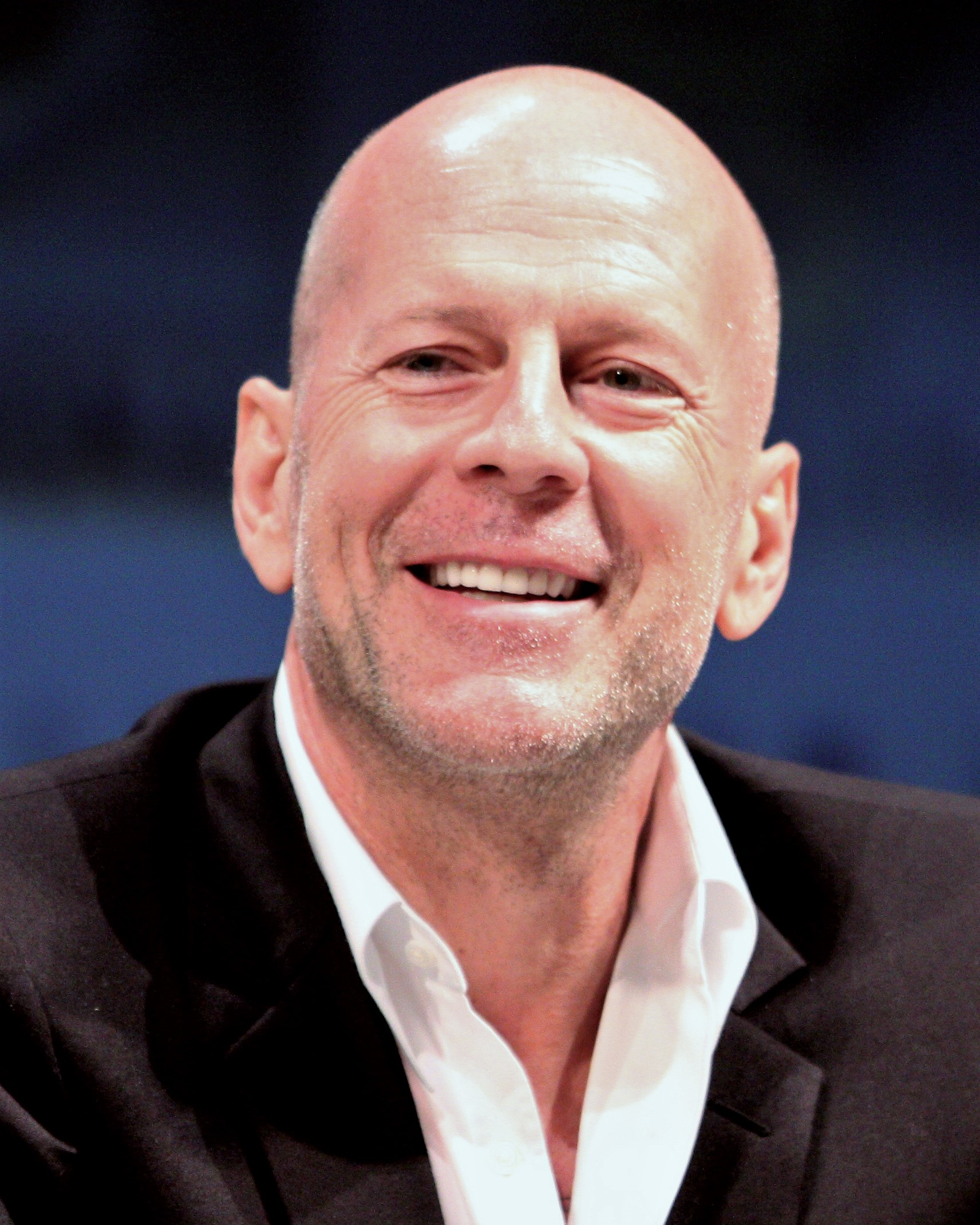
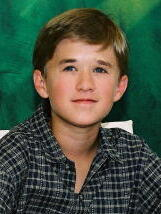
Bruce Willis (left), Haley Joel Osment
- Bruce Willis as Malcolm Crowe
- Toni Collette as Lynn Sear
- Olivia Williams as Anna Crowe
- Haley Joel Osment as Cole Sear
- Donnie Wahlberg as Vincent Grey
- Glenn Fitzgerald as Sean
- Mischa Barton as Kyra Collins
- Trevor Morgan as Tommy Tammisimo
- Bruce Norris as Mr. Stanley Cunningham
- Angelica Page as Mrs. Collins
- Greg Wood as Mr. Collins
- M. Night Shyamalan as Dr. Hill
- Peter Tambakis as Darren
- Jeffrey Zubernis as Bobby

== Production ==
=== Development ===
David Vogel, then-president of production of Walt Disney Studios, read M. Night Shyamalan's spec script and loved it. Without obtaining corporate approval, Vogel bought the rights, despite the price of $3 million and the stipulation that Shyamalan could direct the film. Disney dismissed Vogel from his position at the studio, and Vogel left the company shortly thereafter. Disney sold the production rights to Spyglass Entertainment, while retaining the distribution rights and 12.5% of the film's box office takings.

=== Casting ===
During the casting process for the role of Cole Sear, Shyamalan had been apprehensive about Haley Joel Osment's video audition, saying later he was "this really sweet cherub, kind of beautiful, blond boy". Shyamalan saw the role as darker and more brooding but felt that Osment "nailed it with the vulnerability and the need ... He was able to convey a need as a human being in a way that was amazing to see."

Bruce Willis was cast in the role of Malcolm Crowe as part of a deal to compensate the studio for Willis's role in the implosion of Broadway Brawler the year before.

Marisa Tomei was considered for the role of Lynn Sear.

Michael Cera auditioned for the role of Cole Sear, and Liam Aiken was offered the role, but turned it down.

=== Filming ===
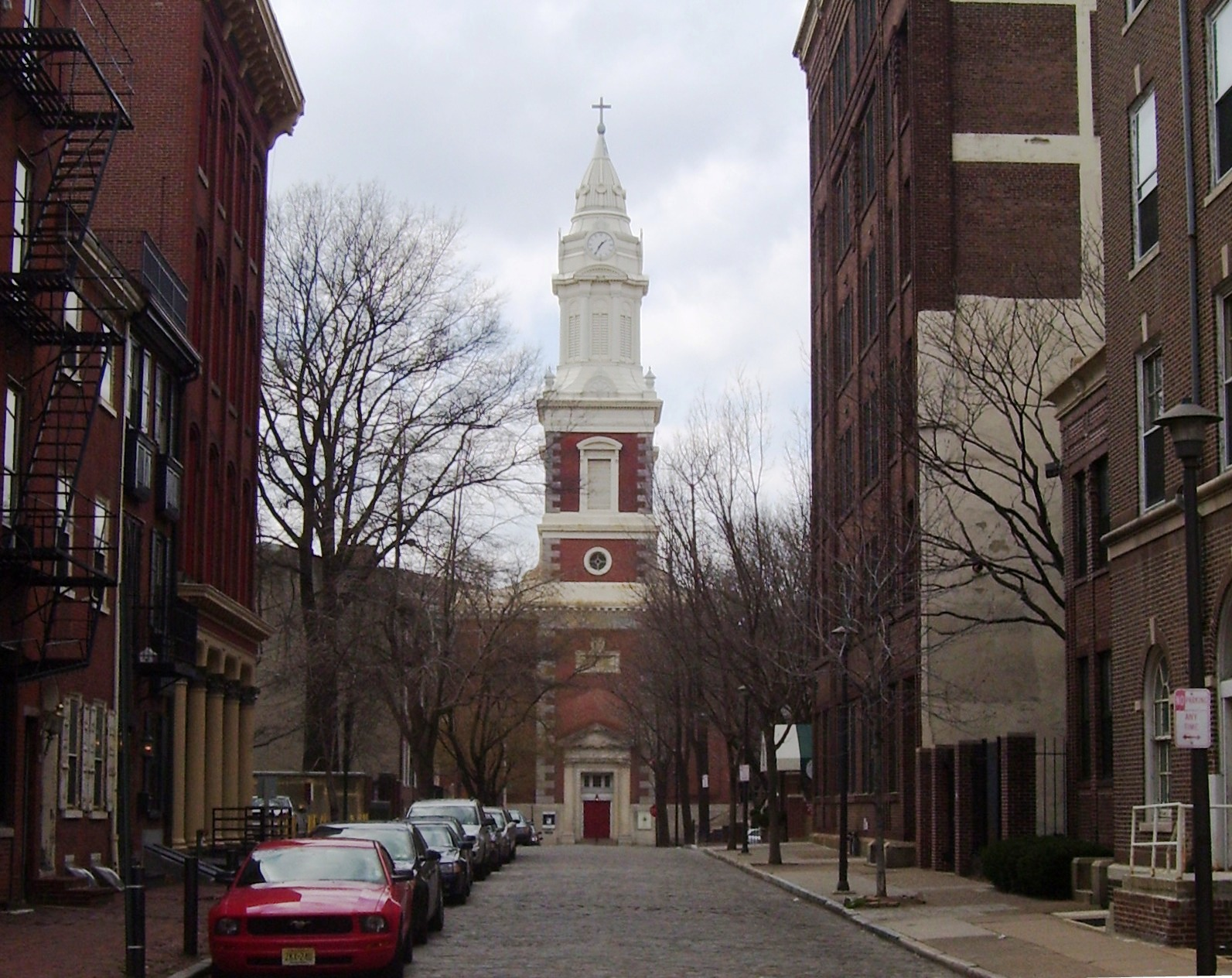
St. Augustine's Church in Philadelphia was used as a filming location

The color red is absent from most of the film, but it is used prominently in a few isolated shots for "anything in the real world that has been tainted by the other world" and "to connote really explosively emotional moments and situations". Examples include the door of the church where Cole seeks sanctuary; the balloon, carpet, and Cole's sweater at the birthday party; the tent in which he first encounters Kyra; the volume numbers on Crowe's tape recorder; the doorknob on the locked basement door where Malcolm's office is located; the shirt that Anna wears at the restaurant; Kyra's mother's dress at the wake; and the shawl wrapped around the sleeping Anna.

All the clothes Malcolm wears are items he wore or touched the evening before his death, including his overcoat, his blue rowing sweatshirt and the different layers of his suit. Though the filmmakers were careful about clues of Malcolm's true state, the camera zooms slowly towards his face when Cole says, "I see dead people." The filmmakers initially feared this would be too much of a giveaway, but left it in.

Location filming took place mostly in streets and buildings of Philadelphia, including St. Augustine's Church on 4th and New Streets in Old City and on Saint Albans Street in Southwest Center City. According to Shyamalan, the film was mainly shot in chronological order. In a 2025 interview, Collette said she only realized she was part of a horror movie after witnessing a scene being edited involving Mischa Barton and Osment.

== Release ==
The film's red carpet was on August 2, 1999. The Sixth Sense was released on August 6, 1999, by Buena Vista Pictures Distribution. Buena Vista handled North American distribution while Spyglass Entertainment handled international sales. Buena Vista International acquired distribution rights in the United Kingdom, Latin America, Australia, and Singapore.

=== Home media ===
After a six-month online promotion campaign, The Sixth Sense was released on VHS and DVD by Hollywood Pictures Home Video on March 28, 2000. It went on to become the top-selling DVD of 2000, with more than 2.5 million units shipped, and the all-time second best-selling DVD title up until then, as well as the top video rental title of all-time. The film generated at least $173,320,000 (equivalent to $324,000,000 in 2025) from the US home video market, including $125,850,000 (equivalent to $235,000,000 in 2025) from VHS rentals in the US.

A new two-disc Vista Series DVD release would premiere on January 15, 2002.

In the United Kingdom, it was the third-most-watched film of 2003 on television, with 9 million viewers that year.

The film was released on Blu-ray in September 2008, and on Ultra HD Blu-ray in October 2024.

== Reception ==
=== Box office ===
The Sixth Sense had a production budget of approximately $40 million (plus $25 million for prints and advertising). During its opening weekend, the film grossed $26.6 million, making it the largest August opening weekend, surpassing The Fugitive (1993). It would go on to hold this record for two years until it was overtaken by Rush Hour 2 in 2001. The film spent five weeks as the number 1 film at the U.S. box office, becoming only the second film, after Titanic (1997), to have grossed more than $20 million each for five weekends. With a total gross of $29.2 million, The Sixth Sense set the record for having the largest Labor Day weekend gross until 2007 when it was surpassed by Halloween. During Labor Day, it made $6.3 million, making it the biggest September Monday gross, holding that record until it was beaten by It in 2017. It grossed $293,506,292 in the United States and Canada, surpassing The Empire Strikes Back (1980) as the tenth-highest-grossing film of all time in that market at the time.

In Europe, the film sold 37,124,510 tickets at the box office. In the United Kingdom, it was given at first a limited release on nine screens, and entered at number 8 at the UK box office before climbing up to number one the following week with 430 theatres playing the film. The film had a record opening in the Netherlands. After its theatrical run, it had made a worldwide gross of $672,806,292, ranking it ninth on the list of worldwide box-office money earners at the time.

=== Critical response ===
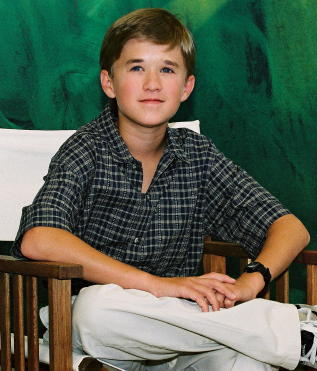
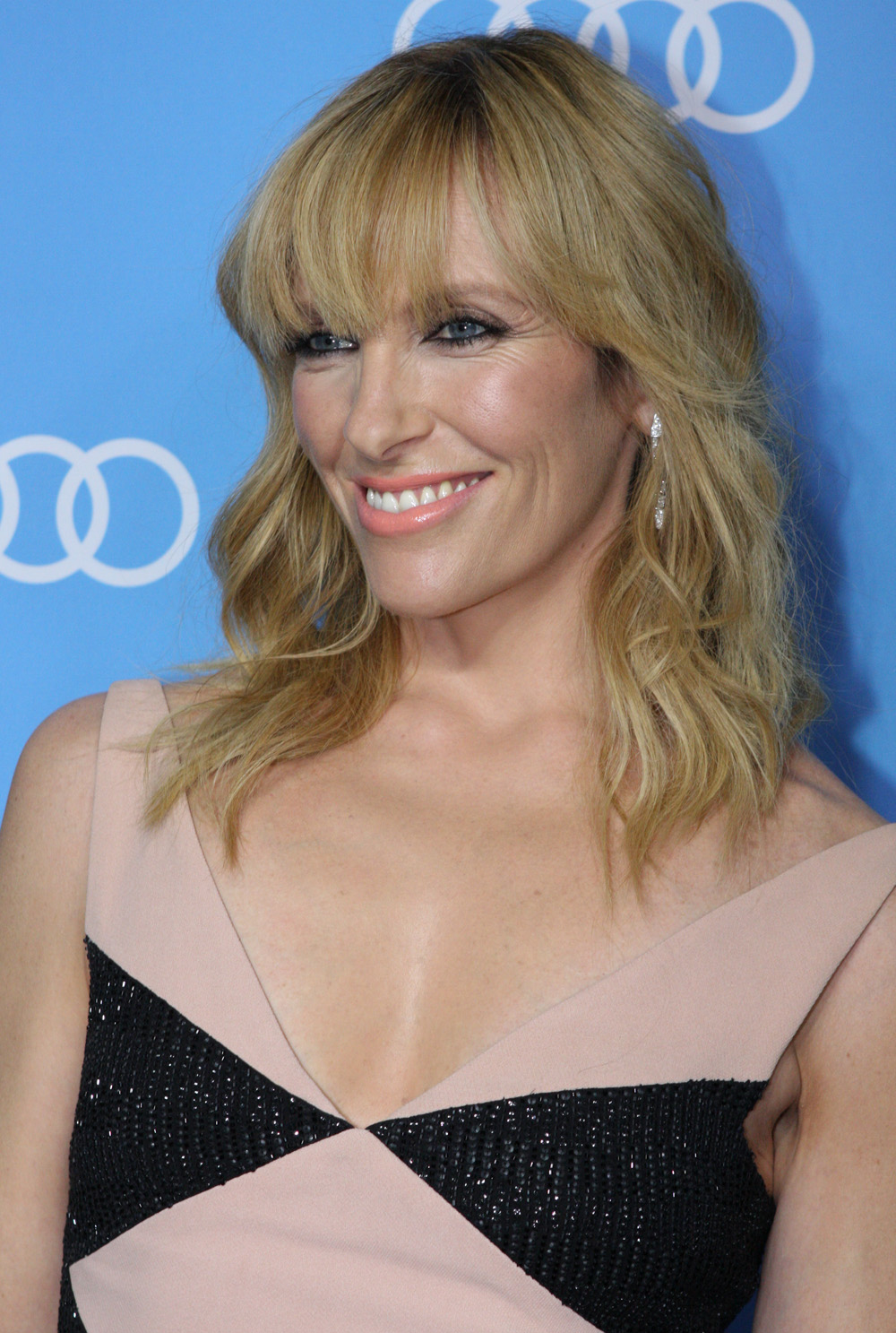
Haley Joel Osment and Toni Collette's performances garnered positive reviews and were nominated for Academy Awards for Best Supporting Actor and Best Supporting Actress, respectively.

The Sixth Sense received critical acclaim, with Osment's performance receiving high praise in particular. On the review aggregator website, Rotten Tomatoes, the film has an approval rating of 86% based on reviews from 166 critics, with an average rating of 7.70/10. The site's critical consensus reads: "M. Night Shyamalan's The Sixth Sense is a twisty ghost story with all the style of a classical Hollywood picture, but all the chills of a modern horror flick." Metacritic rated it 64 out of 100 based on 35 reviews, meaning "generally favorable reviews". Audiences polled by CinemaScore gave the film an average grade of "A−" on an A+ to F scale.

Roger Ebert awarded the film a 3 out of 4-star rating and was particularly impressed by Osment's performance, writing: "Haley Joel Osment, his young co-star, is a very good actor in a film where his character possibly has more lines than anyone else. He's in most of the scenes, and he has to act in them–this isn't a role for a cute kid who can stand there and look solemn in reaction shots. There are fairly involved dialogue passages between Willis and Osment that require good timing, reactions and the ability to listen. Osment is more than equal to them. And although the tendency is to notice how good he is, not every adult actor can play heavy dramatic scenes with a kid and not seem to condescend (or, even worse, to be subtly coaching and leading him). Willis can. Those scenes give the movie its weight and make it as convincing as, under the circumstances, it can possibly be." Jeff Millar of the Houston Chronicle stated that "there's more fright in any 10 minutes of The Sixth Sense than the sensory startle effects The Haunting produces in its entire running time."

In his review for the Los Angeles Times, John Anderson wrote that the script was "clever" and called Osment's performance the best of the year from a child actor. Stephen Hunter of The Washington Post said the film was a "maximum creep-out."

By vote of the members of the Science Fiction and Fantasy Writers of America, The Sixth Sense was awarded the Nebula Award for Best Script during 1999.

== Accolades ==
The Sixth Sense has received numerous awards and nominations, with six Academy Award nomination categories ranging from those honoring the film itself (Best Picture), to its writing, editing, and direction (Best Director, Best Editing, and Best Original Screenplay), to its cast's performance (Best Supporting Actor and Best Supporting Actress). Especially lauded was the supporting role of actor Haley Joel Osment, whose nominations include an Academy Award, a Golden Globe Award and a Critics' Choice Movie Award. Overall, The Sixth Sense was nominated for six Academy Awards and four British Academy Film Awards, but won none. The film received three nominations from the People's Choice Awards and won all of them, with lead actor Bruce Willis being honored for his role. The Satellite Awards nominated the film in four categories, with awards being received for writing (M. Night Shyamalan) and editing (Andrew Mondshein). Supporting actress Toni Collette was nominated for both an Academy Award and a Satellite Award for her role in the film. James Newton Howard was honored by the American Society of Composers, Authors and Publishers for his composition of the music for the film.

In 2006, the Writers Guild of America ranked the screenplay #50 on its list of 101 Greatest Screenplays ever written.

The February 2020 issue of New York Magazine lists The Sixth Sense as among "The Best Movies That Lost Best Picture at the Oscars."

=== American Film Institute lists ===
- AFI's 100 Years...100 Thrills – No. 60
- AFI's 100 Years...100 Movie Quotes:
  - "I see dead people." – No. 44
- AFI's 100 Years...100 Movies (10th Anniversary Edition) – No. 89

== See also ==
- List of ghost films
- "The Hitch-Hiker", a 1960 episode of The Twilight Zone with a similar twist
